= List of Shetland islands =

The Shetland archipelago

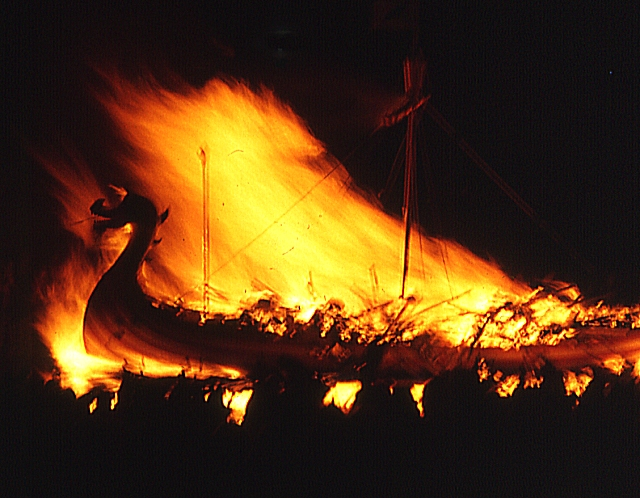
Up Helly Aa festival

The Shetland archipelago is located 100 kilometres (62 mi) north of mainland Scotland and the capital Lerwick is almost equidistant from Bergen in Norway and Aberdeen in Scotland. The archipelago comprises about 300 islands and skerries, of which 16 are inhabited. In addition to the Shetland Mainland the larger islands are Unst, Yell and Fetlar.

The definition of an island used in this list is that it is land that is surrounded by seawater on a daily basis, but not necessarily at all stages of the tide, excluding human devices such as bridges and causeways. There are four islands joined to the Shetland Mainland by bridges, East Burra, West Burra, Trondra, and Muckle Roe. There is also a bridge from Housay to Bruray. Nowhere in Shetland is more than three miles (5 km) from the sea. Mavis Grind (Old Norse for "gate of the narrow isthmus") is a narrow neck of land little more than 100 metres (328 feet) wide separating St. Magnus Bay and the Atlantic in the west from Sullom Voe and the North Sea in the east.

The geology of Shetland is complex with numerous faults and fold axes. These islands are the northern outpost of the Caledonian orogeny and there are outcrops of Lewisian, Dalradian and Moine metamorphic rocks with similar histories to their equivalents on the Scottish mainland. Similarly, there are also Old Red Sandstone deposits and granite intrusions. The most distinctive feature is the ultrabasic ophiolite, peridotite and gabbro on Unst and Fetlar, which is a remnant of the Iapetus Ocean floor. Much of the island's economy depends on the oil-bearing sediments in the surrounding seas. In the post-glacial epoch, c. 6200 BC, the islands experienced a tsunami up to 20 metres high caused by the Storegga Slides, an immense underwater landslip off the coast of Norway.

The islands all fall within the Shetland Islands Council local authority. They have been continuously inhabited since Neolithic times and experienced Norse rule for several centuries, the first written records being the Norse sagas. The excavations at Jarlshof near the southern end of the Mainland have provided archaeological evidence of life in Shetland since Bronze Age times and the annual Up Helly Aa fire festivals are a living reminder of Shetland's Viking past. The archipelago is exposed to wind and tide and there are numerous lighthouses as an aid to navigation. A small wind farm in Shetland recently achieved a world record of 58% capacity over the course of a year. The indigenous Shetland ponies are reputed for their strength and hardiness.

== Main list ==
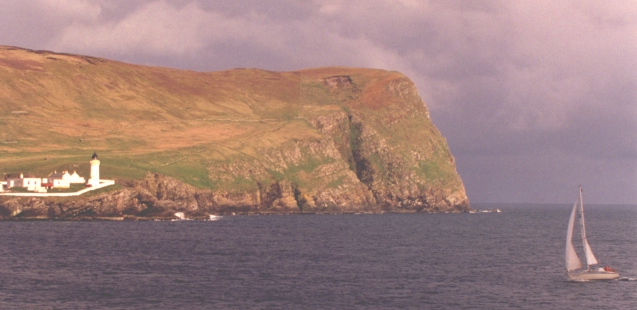
Bressay Lighthouse at Kirkabister Ness, Shetland

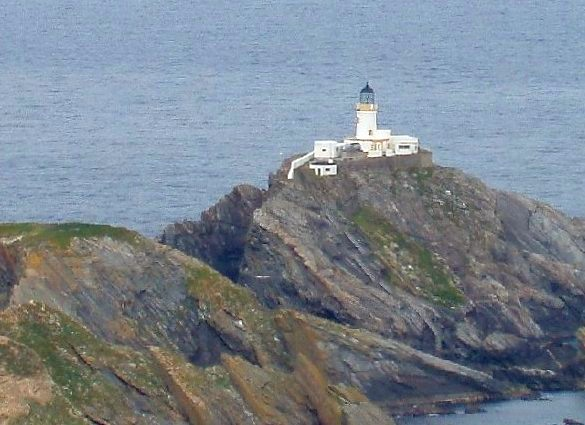
Muckle Flugga lighthouse, Shetland

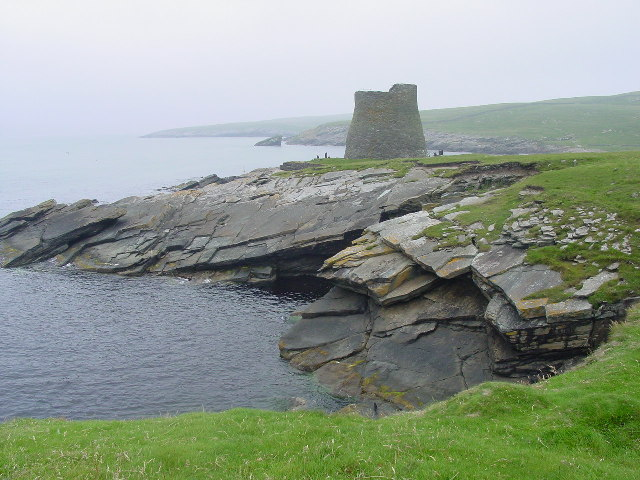
The broch on Mousa

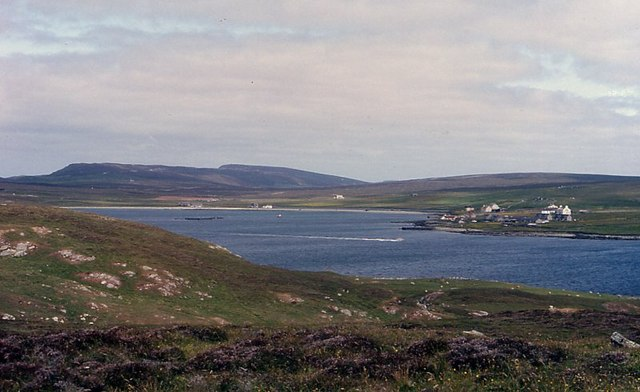
The Mainland from Uyea

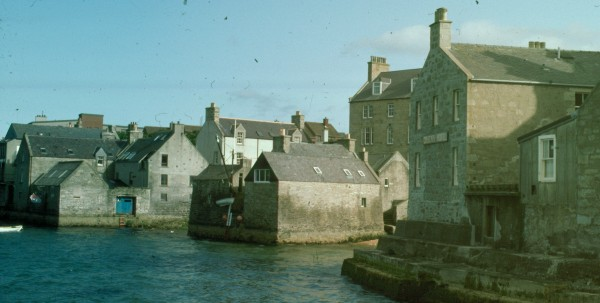
Lerwick

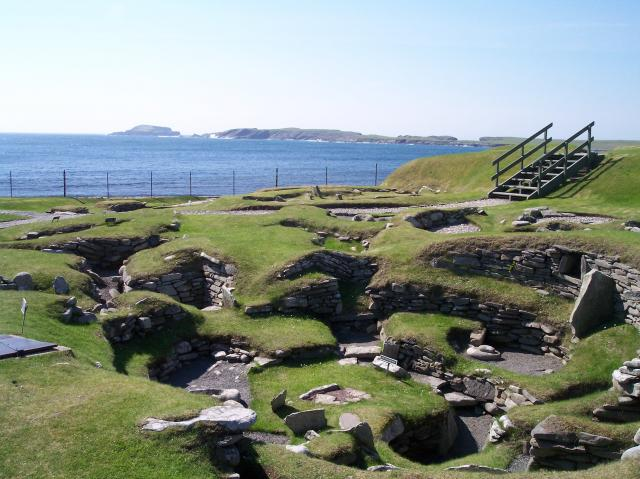
Jarlshof

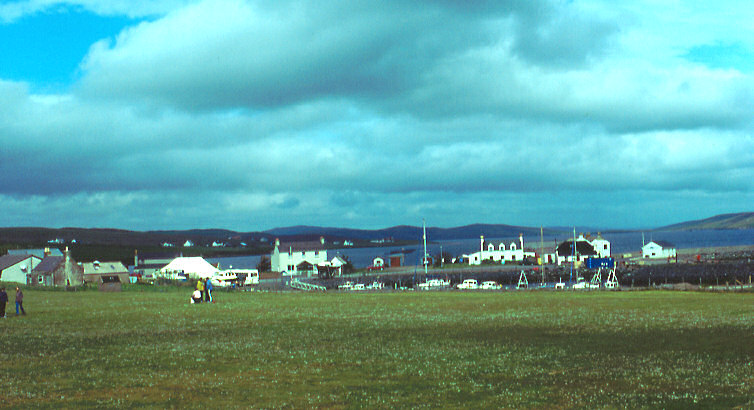
The Mainland village of Aith

The Scalloway Islands are a small archipelago at the entrance to Weisdale Voe in the South West. The North Isles is the name given to the group including Yell, Unst and Fetlar. There are also numerous islands in Yell Sound between the Mainland and Yell and in St. Magnus Bay to the west, especially near the strait of Swarbacks Minn, but the number and diverse locations of the Shetland islands makes further classification difficult.

Records for the last date of settlement for the smaller uninhabited islands are incomplete, but almost of the islands listed here would have been inhabited at some point during the Neolithic, Pictish, Norse or modern periods.

'Ward' appears regularly as the name of the highest point on the island. The derivation of the name is from those high places being used for the lighting of warning beacons.

The total population of the archipelago was 21,988 in 2001, had grown to 23,167 by the time of the 2011 census and was 22,986 in 2022.

Large/Inhabited islands in the Shetland archipelago
Island	Location	Area (ha)	Population	Last inhabited	Highest point	Height (m)
Balta	North Isles	80	0	Norse times or later	Muckle Head	44
Bigga	Yell Sound	78	0	1930s		34
Bressay	East of Lerwick	2,805	345		Ward of Bressay	226
Brother Isle	Yell Sound	40	0	1820s?		25
Bruray	Out Skerries	55	16		Bruray Ward	53
East Burra	Scalloway Islands	515	105		Easter Heog	81
Fair Isle	Outlier	768	44		Ward Hill	217
Fetlar	North Isles	4,078	66		Ward Hill	158
Foula	Outlier	1,265	17		The Sneug	418
Hascosay	Colgrave Sound, Yell	275	0	1850s		30
Hildasay	Scalloway Islands	108	0	1890s		32
Housay	Out Skerries	163	21		North Hill	53
Lamba	Yell Sound	43	0	unknown		35
Linga near Muckle Roe	Swarbacks Minn	70	0	unknown		69
Linga	Bluemull Sound, Yell	45	0	unknown		26
Mainland	Mainland	96,879	18,763		Ronas Hill	450
Mousa	East of Mainland	180	0	1841–60	Mid Field	55
Muckle Roe	Swarbacks Minn	1,773	128		Mid Ward	172
Isle of Noss	Bressay	343	0	1930s	Noup of Noss	181
Oxna	Scalloway Islands	68	0	1901–1930	Muckle Ward	38
Papa	Scalloway Islands	59	0	1891–1930		32
Papa Little	Swarbacks Minn	226	0	1840s	North Ward	82
Papa Stour	St Magnus Bay	828	7		Virda Field	87
Samphrey	Yell Sound	66	0	1841–1880		29
South Havra	Scalloway Islands	59	0	1923		42
Trondra	Scalloway Islands	275	152			60
Unst	North Isles	12,068	644		Saxa Vord	284
Uyea, Northmavine	North Mainland	45	0	unknown		70
Uyea, Unst	North Isles	205	0	1931–60	The Ward	50
Vaila	Gruting Voe	327	3		East Ward	95
Vementry	Swarbacks Minn	370	0	1840s	Muckle Ward	90
West Burra	Scalloway Islands	743	772		Hill of Sandwick	65
West Linga	Whalsay	125	0	late 18th century		52
Whalsay	Whalsay	1,970	1,005		Ward of Clett	119
Yell	North Isles	21,211	904		Hill of Arisdale	210

== Smaller islets and skerries ==
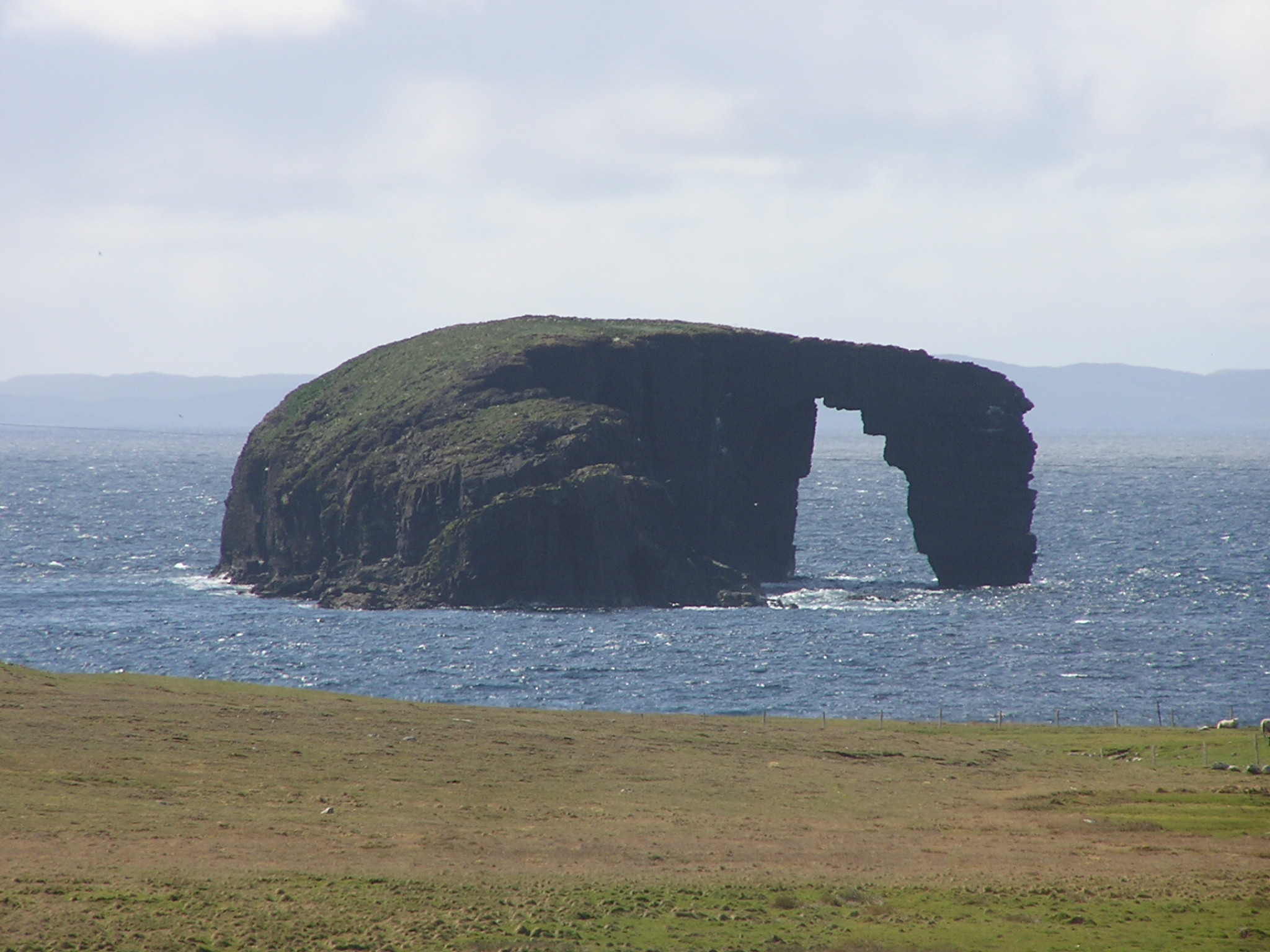
Dore Holm

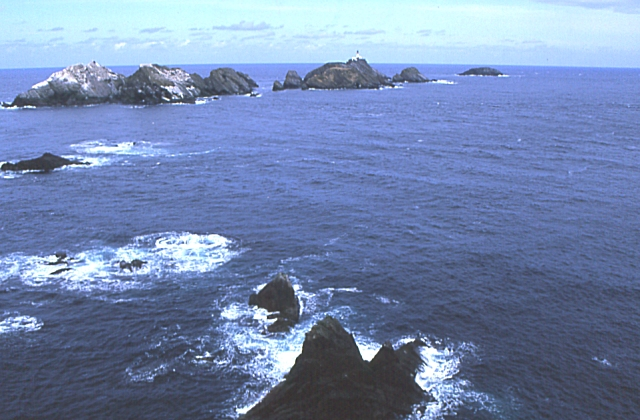
Baa Skerries, Unst

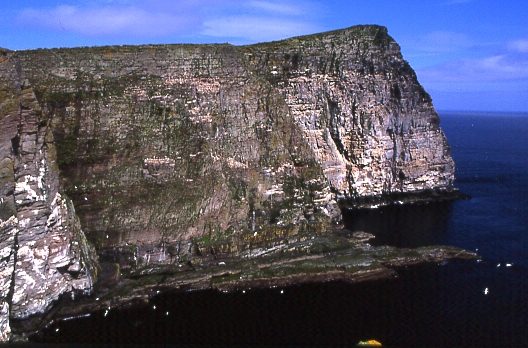
Noup of Noss

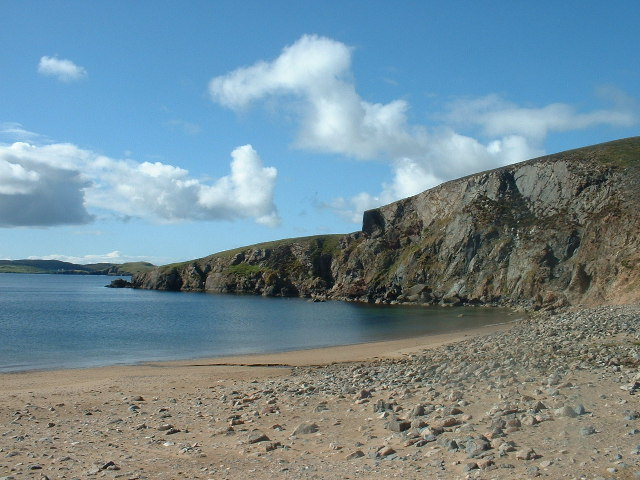
Muckle Ayre, Muckle Roe, looking across Swarbacks Minn

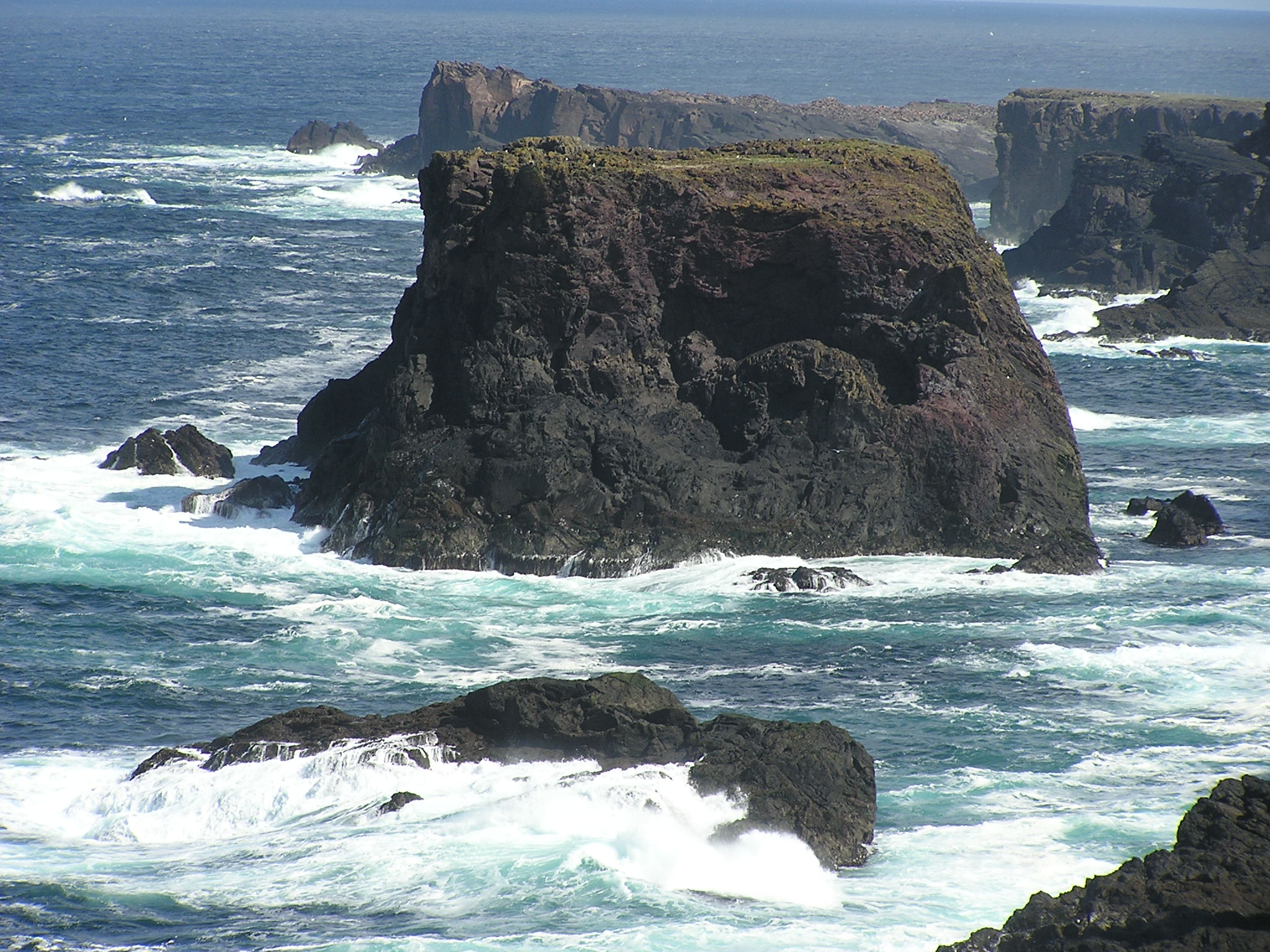
Moo Stack, Eshaness, Northmaven

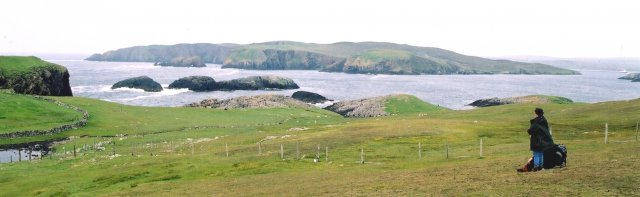
Muckle Flaes and Vaila from the east

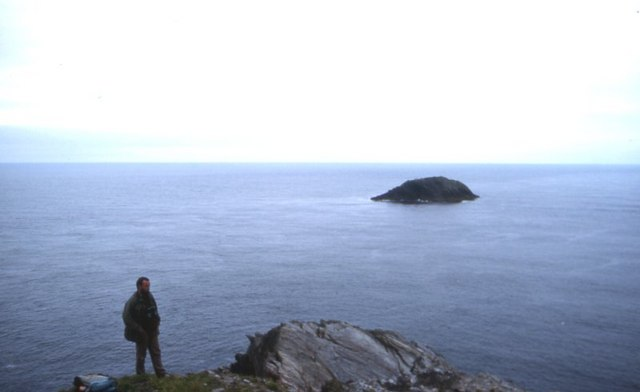
Out Stack, off Unst, the most northerly point in Scotland

This is a continuing list of uninhabited smaller Shetland islands, tidal islets only separated at higher stages of the tide, and skerries which are only exposed at lower stages of the tide. Many of these islets are called "Holm" from the Old Norse holmr, meaning a "small and rounded islet". "Swarta Skerry" (Old Norse:' svartar sker) – "black skerry" is also a common name, as are "Linga", meaning "heather island", "Taing" (Old Norse: tangi) meaning "tongue" and "Flaesh" (Old Norse: fles) meaning "flat skerry". "Hog" and "calf" are used to indicate a small island, in the latter case usually adjacent to a larger one.

=== Surrounding the mainland ===
- North-east Mainland:^{[a]} Bronga, Flat Stack, Green Isle, Hellam, Hog Island, Longa Skerry, Muckle Stack, Sandrift Skerries, Scarve Skerry, Skerry of Lunning, Stack of the Skersons, Stany Hog, Swarta Skerry (3), Taing.
- South Nesting Bay:^{[b]} Climnie, Corn Holm, Cunning Holm, Fiska Skerry, Haerie, Holm of Skellister, Inner Voder, Linga Skerries, Litla Billan, Muckla Billan, Muckle Fladdicap, South Holm, Spentlie Holm.
- East Mainland:^{[c]} Aiplin, Aswick Skerries, Brethren, Eswick Holm, Gult Holm, Holm of Califf, Holms of Vatsland, Hoo Stack, Little Holm, North Isle of Gletness, South Holm, South Isle of Gletness, Stacks of Vatsland, Stunger, Tainga Skerry.
- South Mainland:^{[d]} Balla Skerry, Big Kiln, Big Skerry, Black Skerry, Broad Stack, Cloki Stack, Colsay, Dedda Skerry, Great Skerry, Hog of the Holm, Hog of the Ness, Holm of Helliness, Holm of Sound, Horse Holm, Lady's Holm, Little Holm, Little Tind, Longa Skerry, Loos Laward, Lyoonigie Skerry, Muckle Hallitie, Ord Skerries, Ripack Stack, Scarfa Skerry, Scarfi Skerry, Scarf Taing, Seli Stack, Skerries of Longi-geo, Skerries of Sunngeo, Skerry of Okraquoy, Skersan, Skersund Skerry, Stack of Baronsgeo, Stack of Billyageo, Stack of Okraquoy, Stack of Otter Geo, Starling Rock, Swarta Skerry, The Moul, Wester Skerry, Whale Back.
- St Ninian's Isle: Coar Holm, Fora Stack, High Herbi Clett, Hevda, Hich Holm, Inns Holm, Loose Head, Sand Skerry, Sweyn Holm.
- South West Mainland:^{[e]} Billia Cletts, Black Skerry, Burwick Holm, Cure Holm, Griskerry, Holm of Maywick, Hoove Holm, Kirk Skerry, Little Fogla Stack, Sheep-pund, The Skerry.
- Weisdale Voe:^{[f]} Flotta, Greena, Havra Skerry, Holm of Quoyness, Holms of Hogaland, Hoggs of Hoy, Hoy, Ingra Pund, Junk, North Havra, Scarf Stane, Silver Skerry.
- Walls and Sandness:^{[g]} Aa Skerry, Aaskerry Taing, Berga Stack, Bousta Skerries, Braga, Broch of West Burrafirth, Brough Skerries, Buid Stacks, Burga Stacks, Burnant Stack, Clett (2), Cley Stacks, Crabba Skerry, Daa Skerry, Erne's Stack (2), Fore Holm, Galta Skerry, Galta Stack, Giltarump, Grava Skerries, Groni Stack, Grossa Stack, Holm of Gruting, Holm of Sefster, Isle of West Burrafirth. Kirk Holm, Lang Stack, Litla Stack, Little Flaes, Long Skerry, Moo Stack, Muckle Flaes, Muman Skerry, Neean Skerry, Riv Skerries, Rusna Stacks, Seli Stack, Skerries of Easter Paill, Skerries of Tunasdaal, Skerries of Watsness, Skerry of Dale, Skerry of Stools, Skerry of the Wick, Snap, Swaaba Stack, Tainga Skerries, The Bak, The Heag, The Peak, Trea Wick, Turl Stack.
- Swarbacks Minn & Olna Firth:^{[h]} Burgastoo, Green Holm, Heathery Holm, Holm of Burrafirth, Inga's Holm, Oggar Holm.
- Northmavine:^{[i]} Black Skerry, Black Skerry of Ramnageo, Burro Stacks, Dore Holm, Egilsay, Eina Stack, Gill Stack, Gruna Stack, Holm of Culsetter, Isle of Gunnister, Isle of Nibon, Isle of Niddister, Isle of Westerhouse, Little Ossa, Moo Stack (2), Muckle Ossa, Nista Skerries, Scarf Skerry, Skerry of Eshaness, Isle of Stenness, Stivva, Swart Skerry, Targies, The Bruddans, The Drongs, The Hogg, The Runk.
- North Roe:^{[j]} Buska Stack, Burka Stack, Fugla Ness, Galti Stack (2), Gruna Stack, Hevda Skerries, Inner Booth, Little Gruna Stacks, Longa Skerry, Moo Stack, Munga Skerries, Nista Skerries, Outer Booth, Ship's Stone, Skerries of Fuglaness, Skerry of Skersound, Stack of Sumra, Stack of Weinnia-neap, Stuack, The Cleiver, The Hog, The Roodrans, The Stab, Troll Kona Stack, Valti Stack, Wilma Stack.
  - Gruney and the Ramna Stacks: The Club, Barlcudda, Flae-ass, Fladda, Ofoora, Stab, Hyter (formerly Driter), Speolk, Turla, Scordar, Outer Stack, Gaut Skerries.
- Yell Sound and Sullom Voe:^{[k]} Bark Stack, Billia Skerry, Fish Holm, Linga, Little Holm, Little Roe, Longa Skerry, Lunna Holm, Meokame Skerry, Muckle Holm, North Holm of Burravoe, Outer Skerry, Pund of Barravoe, Sand Skerry, Setter Holm, Sinna Skerry, Skea Skerry, South Holm of Burravoe, Stack of Stavgeo, The Castle, The Flaess, The Neap, Trolla Stack, Trunka, Ungam, Wether Holm.

a. Lunna Holm to The Keen. b. The Keen to Moul of Eswick. c. Moul of Eswick to Easter Rova Head by Lerwick. d. Easter Rova Head to St Ninian's Isle. e. St Ninian's Isle to Usta Ness. f. Usta Ness to Fora Ness. g. Fora Ness to Face of Neeans. h. Face of Neeans to Roe Sound. i. Roe Sound to The Faither. j. The Faither to Point of Fethaland. k. Point of Fethaland to Lunna Holm.

=== Surrounding other islands ===
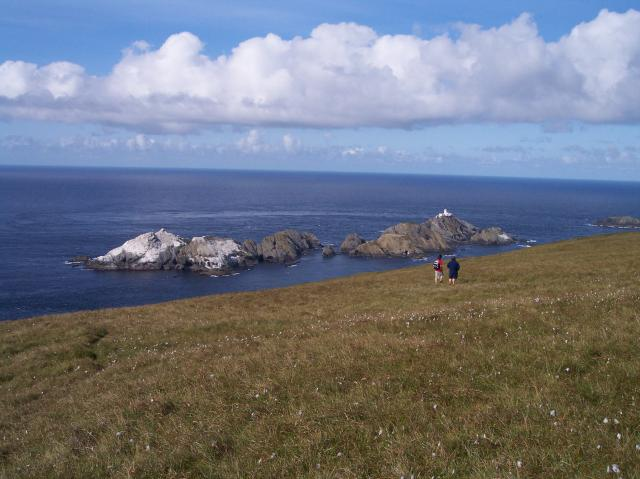
The skerries north of Unst including Vesta Skerry, Rumblings, Tipta Skerry, Muckle Flugga and Out Stack

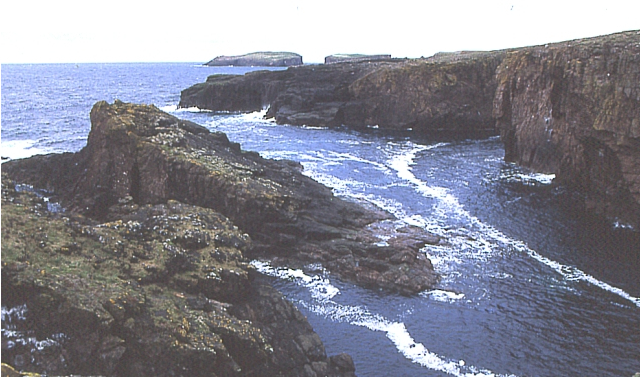
Galti Stacks off Papa Stour with Fogla Skerry in the background.

In the vicinity of:

- Bigga; Sigga Skerry, Uynarey.
- Brother Isle; Stoura Baa, Tinga Skerry.
- Bressay; Flada Cap, Fugla Skerry, Holm of Beosetter, Holm of Cruester, Holm of Gunnista, Holm of Mel, Holm Skerry of Beosetter, Inner Score, Loofa Baa, Outer Score, Stoura Clett.
- East Burra; Holm of Hous, Holm of Papil, Peerie Hom of Clett, Scarf Skerry, Stacks of Houssness, Taing of Symbister.
- Fair Isle; Breiti Stack, Fogli Stack, Hoiliff, Lang Cole, Oa Stack, Stacks of Skroo, Swaabi Cole, The Burrian, The Crivv, The Fless, The Keels, The Skerry.
- Fetlar; Braga, Calf of Daaey, Daaey, Outer Brough, Ruir Holm, Scarf Skerry, Stacks of Scambro, Stany Holm, The Clett, The Flaeshins, The Fludir, Urie Lingey.
- Foula; Arvra Skerry, Blobrick, Da Baas o Stremness, Da Buddle Stane, Da Gloor, Da Rippack Stack, Da Sheepie, Da Skerries o da Rokness, Da Skerry o Hellabrik, Gaada Stack, Muntavie Stack.
- Hildasay; Easter Score Holm, Hogg of Linga, Hoe Skerry (east), Hoe Skerry (north), Langa, Linga, Lunga Skerries, North Score Holm, Sanda Little, Sanda Stour, Swarta Skerry, The Nev, The Skerry, The Skult.
- Mousa; Peerie Bard.
- Muckle Roe; Burki Skerries, Crog Holm, Lee Skerries, Lothan, Murbie Stacks, Riding Stack, Spindle, Swabi Stack, Tame Holm.
- Noss; Holm of Noss.
- Out Skerries; Billia Skerry, Bound Skerry, Easter Skerry, Filla, Flat Lamba Stack, Grunay, Hevda Skerries, Horn Skerry, Lamba Stack, Little Bound Skerry, Little Skerry, Long Guen, Muckle Skerry, North Benelip, Old Man's Stack, Short Guen, South Benelip, Swaba Stack, Tamma Skerry, The Hogg, Vongs, Wether Holm.
- Oxna; Bullia Skerry, Bulta, Bulta Skerry, Burrian, Cheynies, Hoggs of Oxna, Retta Skerries, Spoose Holm, Steggies.
- Papa; Hogg of Papa, Papa Skerry, Skerry of Bag, West Head of Papa.
- Papa Stour; Aesha Stack, Boinna Skerry, Borse Skerry, Brei Holm, Fogla Skerry, Forewick Holm, Galti Stacks, Holm of Melby, Koda Skerry, Lyra Skerry, Maiden Stack, Skerries of Quidaness, Skerry of Lambaness, Sula Stack, Swarta Skerry, The Horn, Tiptans Skerry, Wilma Skerry.
  - Ve Skerries: Helliogoblo, North Skerry, Ormal, Reaverack, The Clubb.
- South Havra: Little Havra.
- Trondra: Black Skerry, Burland Skerry, Green Holm, Merry Holm, Skervie Skerry, Whaleback Skerry.
- Unst; Baa Skerries, Braava Skerries, Brindacks, Brough Holm, Crickie's Chair, Cudda Stack, Flodda Stack, Haaf Gruney, Hevda Skerry, Hinda Stack, Holm of Heogland, Holm of Skaw, Humla Stack, Huney, Hunts Holm, Inner Flaess, Lang Holm, Leegal Skerry, Little Flugga, Littlewick Stack, Longa Stacks, Muckle Flugga, Neapna Stack, North Croga Skerry, North Holms, Out Stack, Reasings, Round Holm, Rumblings, Ruskock, Sound Gruney, South Croga Skerry, South Holms, Stackingro, Stackins-hocka, Stacks of Poindie, The Buss, The Greing, The Taing, Tipta Skerry, Tonga Stack, Tooa Stack, Tooral Stack, The Trinks o' Clave, The Vere, Urda Stack, Vesta Skerry, Whid Stack, Wilna Stack, Wurs Stack.
- Uyea, Northmavine: Big Nev, Dorra Stack, Little Nev, Out Shuna Stack, Robert Irvine's Skerry, The Burrier.
- Uyea, Unst: Cliva Skerries, Scarf Stack, Wedder Holm.
- Vaila: Burrier Stacks, Gaada Stacks, Gluibuil, Holm of Breibister, Holm of Burrastow, Holm of Stapness, Humla Stack, Linga, Skerries of Linga, Stack of the Cuillian.
- Vementry: Black Stane, Gruna, Holms of Uyea-sound, Linga, Skewart Holm, Swaba Stacks, Swarbacks Skerry, The Heag.
- West Burra: Atla Holm, Black Stacks, Fugla Stack, Inner Skerry, Kettla Ness, Muckle Skerry, Red Skerries, Stack of Sandwick, Trondra Skerry, Ukna Skerry, West Skerry.
- West Linga: Beilla Skerry, Bruse Holm, Calf of Linga, Calf of Little Linga, Calf of Score Holm, Hunder Holm, Ketill Holm, Little Linga, Longa Skerry, Marra Flaeshins, Score Holm, Swarta Skerry, The Flaeshans, Wether Holm.
- Whalsay; Flaeshans of Sandwick, Holm of Sandwick, Inner Holm of Skaw, Isbister Holm, Mooa, Nacka Skerry, Nista, Outer Holm of Skaw, Sava Skerry, Skate of Marrister, Trota Stack.
  - East Linga; Burlastack of Rumble, Calf of Linga, Flaeshans of Rumble, Grif Skerry, Longa Skerries, Longa Stack, Rumble, Swarta Skerries.
- Yell; Aastack, Bigga, Black Skerry, Brother Isle, Brough, Burravoe Chest, Fish Holm, Gloup Holm, Gold Skerry, Green Holm, Grey Stack, Holm of West Sandwick, Horns of the Roe, Kay Holm, Linga, Muckle Holm, Neapaback Skerries, Orfasay, Outsta Ness, Rug, Skerry Wick, Stacks of Stuis, Sweinna Stack, The Clapper, The Quidin, Whalegeo Stacks, Whilkie Stack.

== Tidal islands ==
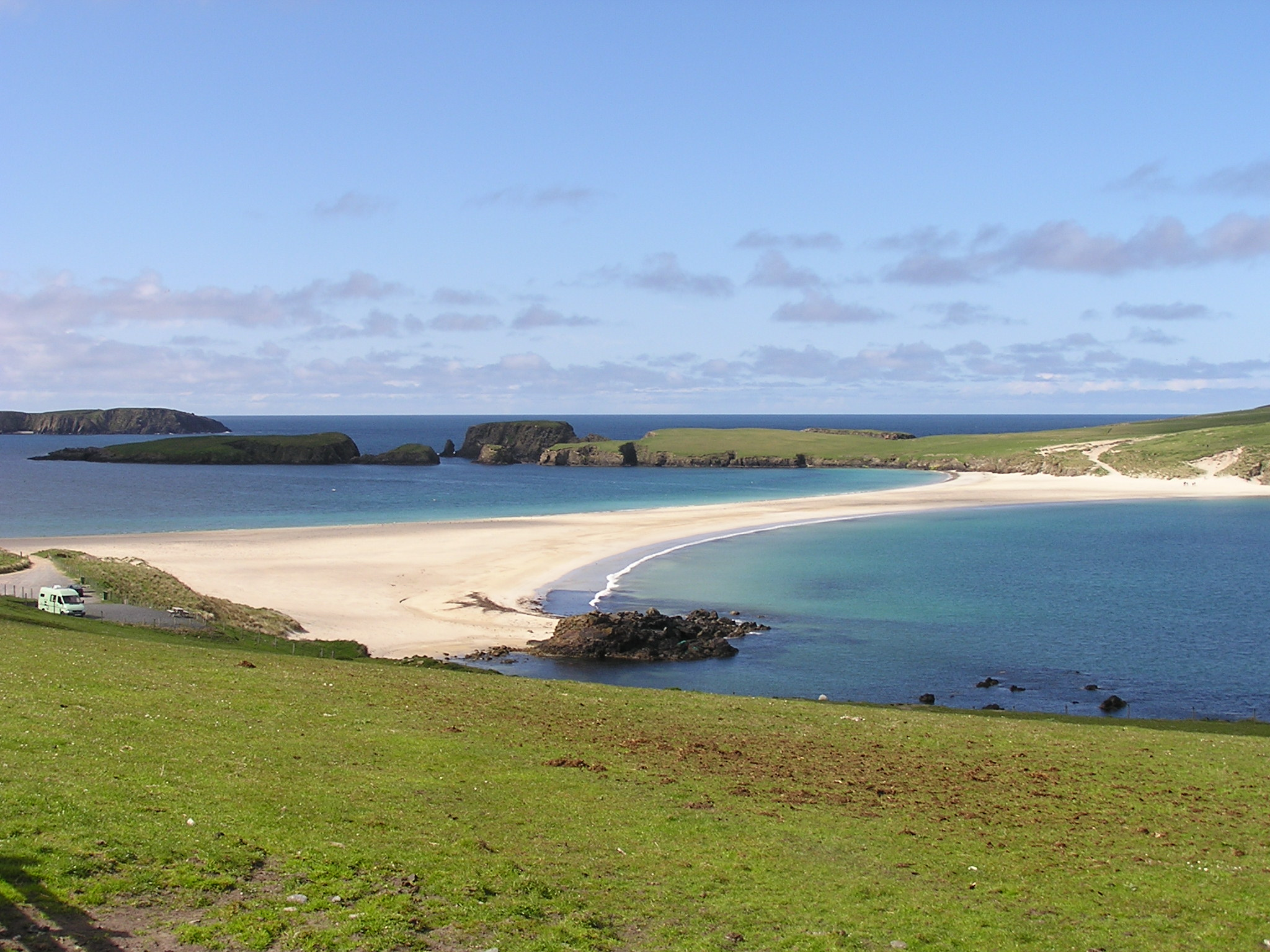
St Ninian's Isle tombolo

St Ninian's Isle is connected to Mainland Shetland by the largest active tombolo in the United Kingdom. Although the 'isle' is greater than 40 hectares in size it fails to meet the definition of an island used in this list as it is only surrounded by water during occasional spring tides and storms.

Gluss Isle, similarly, is a peninsula connected to the mainland with a tombolo, and as such is not truly an island.

Huney also has a tombolo that may connect it to Unst at very low tides.

== Marilyns ==
Marilyns in the Shetland islands
Peak	Height (m)	Prom. (m)	Col (m)	Grid ref.	Parent	Island
Ronas Hill	450	450	Sea	HU305835	none	Mainland
The Sneug	418	418	Sea	HT947395	none	Foula
Royl Field	293	287	6	HU396285	Ronas Hill	Mainland
Saxa Vord	284	284	Sea	HP631167	none	Unst
Fitful Head	283	270	13	HU346135	Royl Field	Mainland
Scalla Field	281	266	15	HU389572	Royl Field	Mainland
Sandness Hill	249	226	23	HU191557	Scalla Field	Mainland
Ward of Bressay	226	226	Sea	HU502387	none	Bressay
Ward Hill	217	217	Sea	HZ208734	none	Fair Isle
Hill of Arisdale	210	210	Sea	HU495842	none	Yell
Dalescord Hill	252	203	49	HU393684	Scalla Field	Mainland
Valla Field	216	201	15	HP584078	Saxa Vord	Unst
Noss Head	181	181	Sea	HU553399	none	Isle of Noss
The Noup	248	179	69	HT954375	The Sneug	Foula
Scrae Field	216	178	38	HU417361	Royl Field	Mainland
Mid Ward	172	172	Sea	HU320652	none	Muckle Roe
Ward of Scousburgh	263	166	97	HU388188	Royl Field	Mainland
Vord Hill	159	159	Sea	HU622935	none	Fetlar
White Grunafirth	173	155	18	HU275807	Ronas Hill	Mainland

== See also ==
- Geography of Shetland
- Geology of Scotland
- List of islands called Linga
- List of islands of Scotland
- List of Orkney islands
- List of Outer Hebrides
- North Sea islands
- Shetland population

== References and footnotes ==
General references

- Haswell-Smith, Hamish. (2004) The Scottish Islands. Edinburgh. Canongate. ISBN 1-84195-454-3
- General Register Office for Scotland (28 November 2003) Scotland's Census 2001 – Occasional Paper No 10: Statistics for Inhabited Islands. Retrieved 26 February 2012.
- Ordnance Survey. OS Maps Online (Map). 1:25,000. Leisure.
- Schei, Liv Kjørsvik (2006) The Shetland Isles. Grantown-on-Spey. Colin Baxter Photography. ISBN 978-1-84107-330-9

Specific references and notes
