= St Magnus Bay =

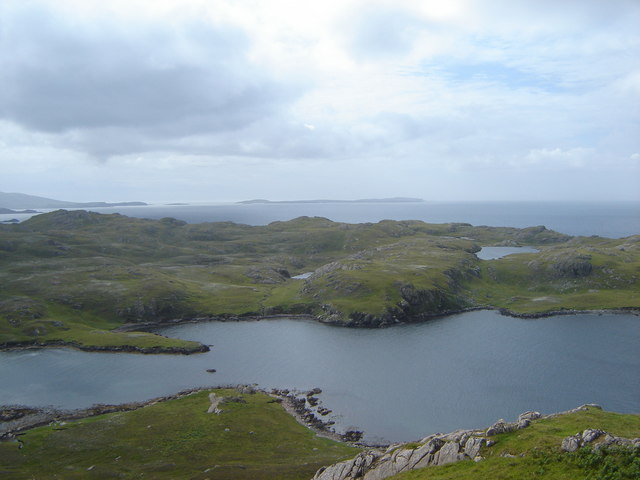
- Vementry with St Magnus Bay and Papa Stour beyond

- St Magnus Bay within Shetland
- Location: Northwest of Mainland, Shetland
- Coordinates: 60.4°N 1.6°W
- Type: Bay
- Surface area: 360 km^{2} (140 sq mi)

St Magnus Bay is a large coastal feature in the north-west of Mainland Shetland, Scotland. Roughly circular in shape with a diameter of about 19 kilometres (12 mi), it is open to the North Atlantic Ocean to the west. The indented coastline to the north, south and east between Esha Ness in the north and the Ness of Melby in the south contains numerous bays, firths and voes and there are several islands around the perimeter. The waters of the bay are up to 165 metres (541 ft) deep and may have been the site of a substantial meteor impact.

The geology of the area is complex and there are numerous caves and cliffs around the coastline, which has been inhabited since prehistoric times. The sheltered inner waters of the bay have provided a refuge for vessels in times of both peace and war. Shetland was part of the Scandinavian world from the late first millennium until 1469, when the islands became transferred to Scotland and as a result most of the place names around the bay and some of its present-day culture are of Norse origin.

== Inlets and islands ==
The land that is furthest southwest in St Magnus Bay is Ve Skerries, a reef that is a hazard to shipping. 5 kilometres (3.1 mi) southwest from there is the inhabited island of Papa Stour with its outliers Brei Holm, Fogla Skerry and Maiden Stack. Forewick Holm, and Holm of Melby lie in the Sound of Papa that separates Papa Stour from the mainland parish of Walls and Sandness. Further east is the narrow Voe of Snaraness and then West Burra Firth containing the ruins of the Broch of West Burrafirth on a small islet. North of West Burra Firth are Isle of West Burrafirth and The Heag. Further east still the isles of Vementry, Gruna and Linga lie at the head of the sinuous Brindister Voe, which itself subdivides into Mo Wick and The Vadills and then there are Voe of Clousta and North Voe of Clousta.

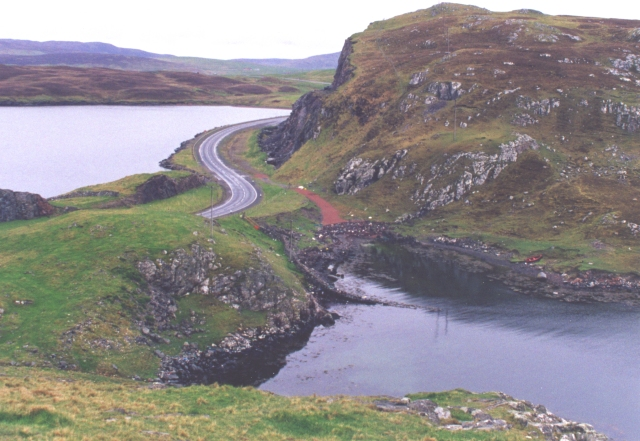
Mavis Grind from the north, with an inlet of St Magnus Bay at right and Sullom Voe to the left.

Cribba Sound and Uyea Sound separate Vementry from mainland Sandsting and to the north, across the strait of Swarbacks Minn, is Muckle Roe, the largest of the islands in St Magnus Bay at over 1,700 hectares (4,200 acres). Further east and separated from the mainland by waters of the Rona, is Papa Little, lying in a "pivotal position" at the entrance to Aith Voe, which stretches south for 3 kilometres (1.9 mi) to the sheltered hamlet of Aith in the southeast corner of the greater bay.

Further north are Gon Firth and Olna Firth, at the entrance to which is another and larger island called Linga. The village of Brae lies at the head of Busta Voe. The narrow Roe Sound separates Muckle Roe from mainland Delting and further north is the little voe of Minn, which narrows to only a few metres, then broadens again into a bay that contains the islet of Holm of Culsetter and ends at the narrow isthmus of Mavis Grind. This narrow neck of land joins the Northmavine peninsula to the rest of the Mainland Shetland and separates St Magnus Bay from Sullom Voe, an arm of the North Sea by only just over 90 metres (295 ft) at its narrowest point.

The islands of Egilsay and The Hog lie at the entrance to Mangaster Voe and further north still are Isle of Gunnister and Isle of Nibon near Gunnister Voe. The most northerly waters of the bay are reached at the head of Ura Firth in Northmavine, of which Hamar Voe is an extension to the east. To the west is the 3.5 kilometres (2.2 mi) long peninsula of Hillswick, which is "a headland shaped for all the world like a bunch of grapes hanging from a vine" and the tiny Isle of Westerhouse, then the bays of Sand Wick, Brae Wick and Tang Wick. Esha Ness Lighthouse is close to the north west extremity of the bay and to the south there are the islands of Dore Holm, Isle of Stenness and Skerry of Eshaness.

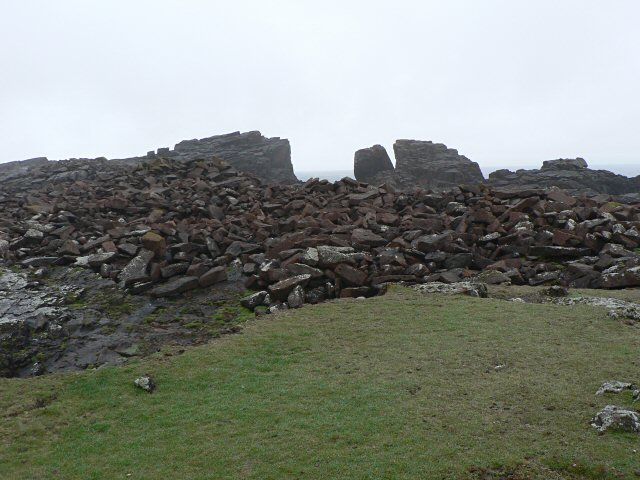
Rocks thrown landward by ocean waves at Grind o Da Navir

The power of the ocean storms is displayed at Grind o Da Navir, a large amphitheatre just north of the Eshaness light that opens out through a breach in the cliffs. Here, the waves have thrown rocks of up to 3 metres (9.8 ft) high over 15 metres (49 ft) above the sea.

Muckle Roe and Esha Ness are part of the Shetland National Scenic Area.

== Geology ==
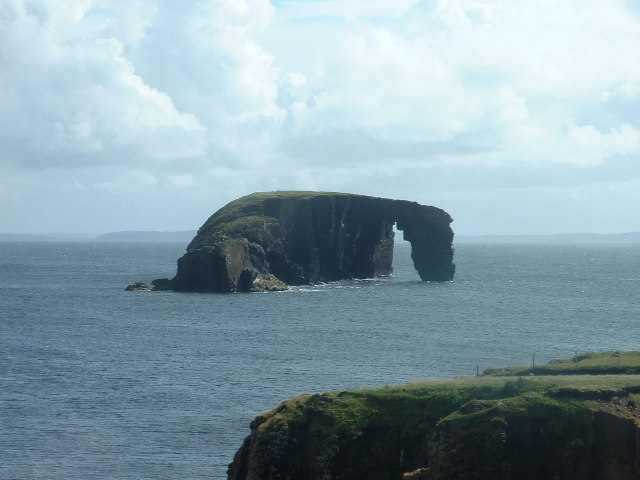
Dore Holm

For its size, Shetland has a complex geology. The base is a platform of Lewisian gneiss overlain with the East Mainland Succession of metamorphic rock, some of Dalriadan age. Basins of Old Red Sandstone and volcanic intrusions of a later date have formed in this metamorphic cover.

It has been suggested that St Magnus Bay may have formed as a meteor impact crater some 30 million years ago. Initially the idea was proposed by A. W. Sharp purely on the basis of the bay's circular shape and he estimated that the original crater had a diameter of 11 kilometres (6.8 mi). Subsequently bathymetric imaging suggests that there is an enclosing under sea ridge on the west side of the bay, although no conclusive evidence has yet been produced of such an event. The bay lies above a sedimentary basin, known as the St Magnus Bay Basin, which contains a thin sequence of sedimentary rocks of probable Permo-Triassic age. This was proven by a shallow borehole in the middle of the bay that encountered sandstone with thin conglomerate bands. The bay was thus probably created by glacial action, with the more resistant igneous rocks now forming the surrounding coastal areas.

Near the Walls Peninsula the basin floor consists mainly of metamorphic rocks of uncertain age. To the west of the St Magnus Bay Fault, the floor of the bay consists of Devonian age continental sediments and volcanic rocks, similar to those exposed on Esha Ness and Papa Stour. The bedrock is covered by a thin sequence of Quaternary sediments of Devensian age.

Western Shetland is cut by the Walls Boundary Fault (an extension of the Great Glen Fault system) that passes north to south through Papa Little and the related St. Magnus Bay Fault that lies further west crossing the bay near Melby in the south and Brae Wick in the north. The fault shows mainly reverse movement, with the eastern side of the fault being upthrown. A significant amount of strike-slip movement is also indicated by the lack of metamorphism shown by the rocks to the west of the fault, where they are close to Devonian intrusions. The rocks on either side of the fault have moved 170 kilometres (110 mi) relative to one another with the western section transposed northward.

West of the St. Magnus Bay Fault the rocks of Papa Stour and Esha Ness are Old Red Sandstone and lavas of Devonian age, which have produced spectacular cliffs at the latter location and numerous caves at the former and at nearby Brei Holm. Kirstan's Hole in the southwest of Papa Stour at HU152606 has been described as the finest sea cave in Britain. Hole of Bordie further north penetrates the massive cliffs for nearly 1 kilometre (0.62 mi).

The southern shores of the bay are largely exposed Lewisian gneiss. Immediately to the west of and east of the Walls Fault the exposures are of Dalriadan gneisses, and to the north and east of the bay the bedrock consists mainly of intrusive Devonian age igneous rocks. These include Muckle Roe granite and granophyre, Mangaster Voe gabbro and Ronas Hill granite.

== History ==
There are numerous prehistoric sites scattered about the margins of the bay. On Vementry for example, there are the well-preserved remains of a Neolithic heel-shaped cairn about 10 metres (33 ft) in diameter and rising to over 1.5 metres (4 ft 11 in) in height. The Maiden Stack or Frau Stack is a tiny stack off Papa Stour. It is so-called because of the tiny house at its top, which said to have been built in the 14th century by Lord Þorvald Þoresson, in order to "preserve" his daughter from men. Unfortunately for him, when she left, she was found to be pregnant. Brei Holm was a leper colony until the 18th century, although it has been suggested that many of the "lepers" there were suffering from a vitamin deficiency rather than leprosy.

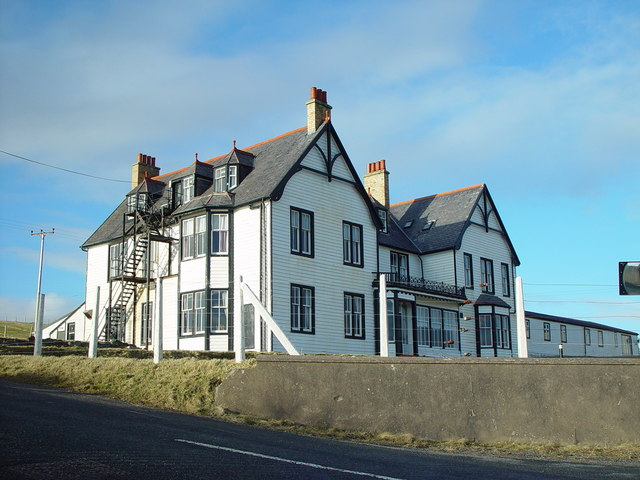
St Magnus Bay Hotel, Hillswick

The white, wood-clad, 33-bedroom St Magnus Bay Hotel was built at Hillswick in 1900 by the North of Scotland, Orkney & Shetland Steam Navigation Company, who operated ferries from mainland Scotland to Orkney and Shetland at the time. They made a success of the venture and the village became a resort even though roads had not yet reached there.

Swarbacks Minn was home to substantial naval operations during the First World War, and was the base for the 10th Cruiser Squadron of armed liners and destroyers that patrolled the northern seas. The RMS Oceanic, once the world's largest ship, sailed from here prior to being wrecked off Foula in 1914. In the 21st century these sheltered waters are the location of a substantial fish farming industry.

In 2008 Forewick Holm was declared by its occasional resident Stuart Hill (aka "Captain Calamity") to be the Crown Dependency of Forvik and thus an independently administered jurisdiction from the UK.

== Etymology ==
The name of the bay itself is a dedication to Magnus Erlendsson, the 11th century Earl of Orkney who was later canonised and most of the names of places in and around the bay have a Norse derivation.

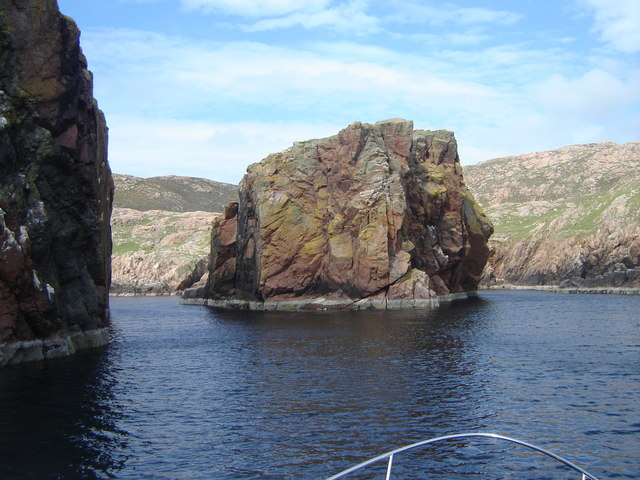
Murbie Stacks and Muckle Roe - the "big red island"

Papa Stour means 'large island of the priests' and forms a pair with Papa Little. Vementry is based on a personal name and is from Vémundar-øy meaning 'Vemundr's isle'. Muckle Roe is a combination of Scots and Norse, muckle meaning 'big' in the former and roe coming from rauðoy, meaning 'red island' in the latter, the Norse name having originally been rauðoy mikla. The red element is a reference to the colouring of its granite foundations. Linga means 'heather isle'.

Mavis Grind (Old Norse: Mæf eiðs grind) means 'gate of the narrow isthmus'. Melby may be from melbu, the "dwelling near the sandy beach". The recurring element minn is from the Old Norse mynni, 'mouth' and ness means headland. Esha Ness is 'the mare's headland' i.e. where they were kept apart from the stallions. Firth is cognate with fjord and a voe is a long narrow bay or inlet from vagr or vogr. The plural form vagar is the origin of "Walls", pronounced locally as "waas" and like Kirkwall in Orkney, cartographers may have assumed that because the sound of the Orcadian -waa element is similar to the Scots pronunciation of "wall" that it meant the same.

== Culture and the arts ==
The Papa Stour sword dance may be of Norse origin and a description of the dance appears in The Pirate by Sir Walter Scott. Papa Stour is also the subject of Vagaland's poem Da Song o da Papa men.
