= Scalloway Islands =

Archipelago in Shetland, Scotland

Coordinates: 60°5′N 1°20′W

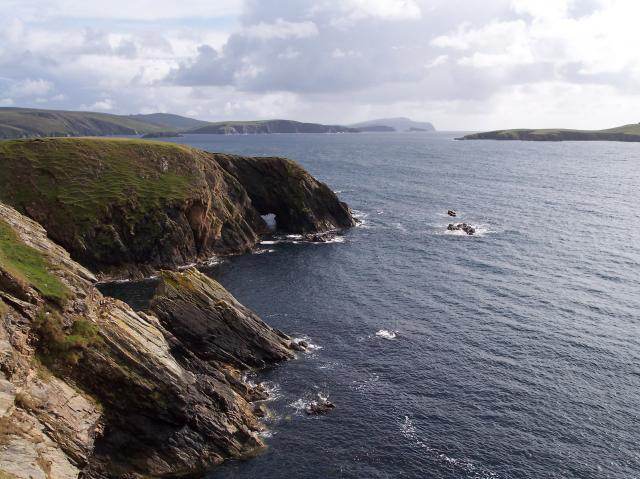
The south end of East Burra

The Scalloway Islands are in Shetland opposite Scalloway on south west of the Mainland. They form a mini-archipelago and include:

- Burra (two islands linked by bridge to each other and Trondra)
  - East Burra (with Houss Ness)
  - West Burra (with Kettla Ness)
  - South Havra
  - Little Havra
  - Papa – belongs to Civil parish of Lerwick
  - West Head of Papa (tidal)

The aforementioned islands were all part of the ancient civil parish of Burra, which was merged with Lerwick in 1891.

They are shown on coloured maps as part of Lerwick.

- Hildasay/Hildesay – belongs to Civil parish of Tingwall
- Langa – belongs to Civil parish of Tingwall
- Linga (not to be confused with numerous Shetland islands of the same name) – belongs to Civil parish of Tingwall
- Oxna – belongs to Civil parish of Tingwall
- Trondra (linked to Mainland, and Burra by bridge) – belongs to Civil parish of Tingwall
- St Ninian's Isle, connected to the Mainland by a tombolo, is not far to the south - belongs to Civil parish of Dunrossness

== See also ==
- List of islands of Scotland
