= Scottish Islands Federation =

Non-profit organisation based in Scotland

The Scottish Islands Federation, founded in November 2007, claims that it aims to promote, publicise and advance the interests of Scotland's islands. It grew out of the informal Scottish Islands Network, which had existed since 2001.

The inaugural conference was held at Craignure on the Isle of Mull. A survey of islanders found that nearly 90% believe that all of Scotland's 90 or more inhabited islands should be able to speak with a common voice and that 77% believe that the Scottish Government should include a minister with specific responsibility for the islands. There was also overwhelming support for a forthcoming pilot scheme to introduce road equivalent tariff that could reduce ferry fares. It was also noted that Scotland's islands have a combined population of nearly 100,000 but have no special government provision, whereas the 3,000 Irish islanders do.

Willie Roe, the Chairman of Highlands and Islands Enterprise speaking at the conference said that here was a new feeling of self-belief among islanders, encouraged by community-based developments on, for example, Gigha, Eigg and Harris and that "our islands are quite exceptional in world terms". Jim Mather, the Scottish Minister for Enterprise, Energy and Tourism stated that "I think it is a self-evident truth that Scotland hasn't properly valued her islands… but we are seeing a quiet revolution".

== See also ==
- Inner Hebrides
- Outer Hebrides
- Orkney
- Shetland
- List of islands of Scotland
- List of Orkney islands
- List of Shetland islands
