= Burra, Shetland =

Collective name for two of the Shetland Islands, West and East Burra

Coordinates: 60°04′34″N 1°19′50″W

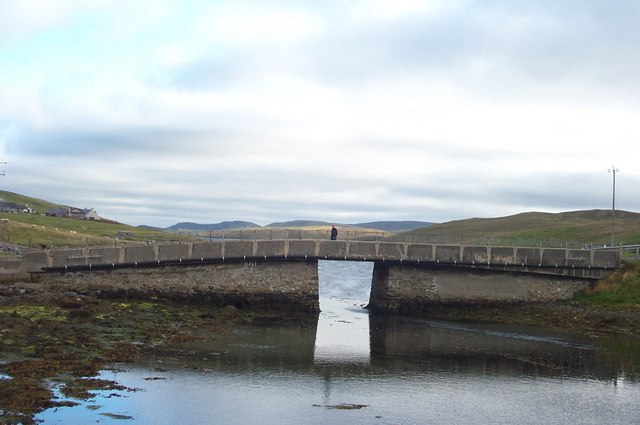
The bridge connecting East and West Burra

Burra (Old Norse: Barrey) is the collective name for two of the Shetland Islands, West (pop. 753) and East Burra (pop. 66), which are connected by bridge to one another, and to the Shetland Mainland via Trondra.

In addition, Burra was an ancient Civil parish that included smaller additional islands such as South Havra, Little Havra, Papa and the tidal island West Head of Papa. The civil parish of Burra was merged into the civil parish of Lerwick, along with Quarff and Gulberwick, in 1891. It continues to exist as Quoad sacra parish of the Church of Scotland.

The form used in the Orkneyinga saga is "Barrey". Collins Encyclopedia of Scotland suggests that the name is a corruption of Borgarey meaning "island of the broch". The place name Brough, on West Burra lends some support to this case and a nearby hillock may have been a broch from which stones were removed to build the pier at Scalloway.
