= The Drongs =

Rock formation in the Shetland Islands, Scotland

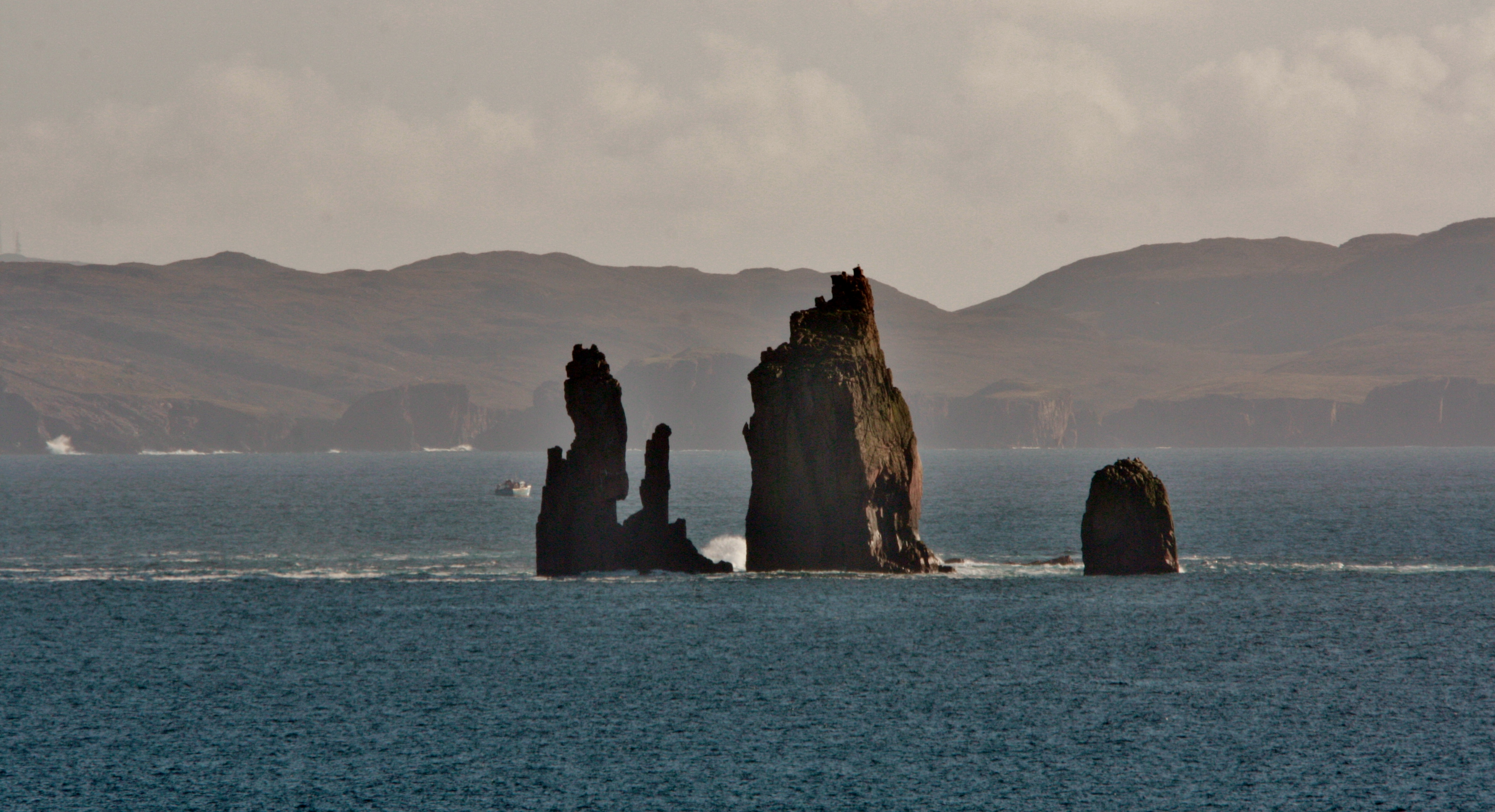
- The Drongs as seen from Braewick

Location
- Location within Shetland
- OS grid reference: HU 26019 75467
- Coordinates: 60°27′44″N 1°31′44″W

Name
- Name meaning: Free standing pillar of rock
- Old Norse name: Drangr

Physical geography
- Island group: Shetland
- Highest elevation: 60 metres (200 ft)

Administration
- Country: Scotland
- Sovereign state: United Kingdom

Demographics
- Population: 0

The Drongs (Shaetlan pronunciation: [də 'drɒŋs] də DRONGS) are a group of sea stacks off the coast of Hillswick Ness, Northmavine, Shetland, Scotland. They lie to the west of the Isle of Westerhouse in St Magnus Bay. They have been described as "a focus of interest from all surrounding parts, including Eshaness", from which they are the most readily viewed, and as such are considered an icon of Eshaness, along with the famous Dore Holm.

== Etymology ==
The name the Drongs comes from the Old Norse drangr, which means "free standing pillar of rock". Drangr is synonymous with the Old Norse word stakkr, which subsequently became the word stack that is used in the names of many sea stacks in Shetland.

== Formation ==
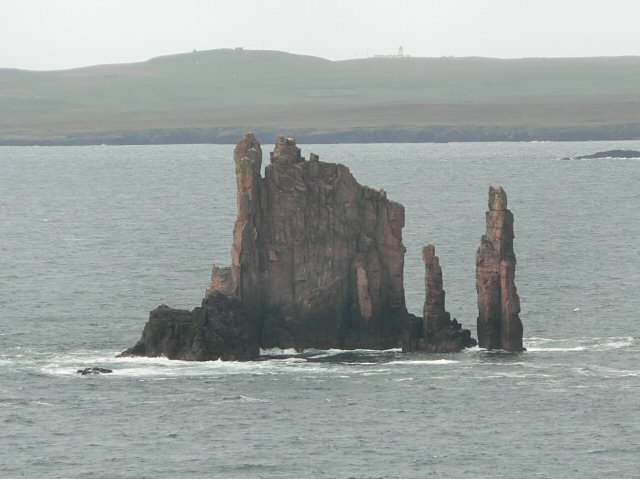
The Drongs as seen from Hillswick Ness

The Drongs consist of tall vertical pillars of granite. There are four main stacks, which have been unofficially termed by climbers as the Main Drong (60 metres, 200 ft), Slender Drong (30 metres, 98 ft), Slim Drong (15 metres, 49 ft) and Stumpy Drong (15 metres, 49 ft). The unusual shape of these sea stacks formed as the result of erosion of a larger landmass composed of both schists and gneiss: the schists eroded more rapidly than the granite gneiss, leaving only the granite pillars.

The appearance of the Drongs from some angles has been likened to a ship under sail, a group of castle towers, or a cowled monk. The rock formation has featured in artwork and has been used as the subject of postcards since at least 1903.

== Climbing ==
In May 1992, climbers Mick Fowler, Andy Nisbet, Jon Lincoln and Craig Jones climbed each of the four main stacks within seven days. Evidence was found that suggested the stacks had been climbed prior to their ascent. The climbs for all four stacks are graded between "Severe" and "Hard Very Severe".

== Sources ==
- Chisholm, Hugh, ed. (1911). "Shetland" . Encyclopædia Britannica. Vol. 24 (11th ed.). Cambridge University Press. p. 854.
- Dunn, Robert (1831). The ornithologist's guide to the islands of Orkney and Shetland (2 ed.). 31 George Street, Hull: Robert Dunn (published 1837). p. 30. OCLC 1050252106. OL 17084227M – via archive.org.
- Grant, Thomas F. (1874). The Drongs, Shetlands (oil on canvas). Photo credit: Museums & Galleries Edinburgh – City of Edinburgh Council. HH2010/1960.
- Green, Samuel Gosnell (1891). Scottish pictures, drawn with pen and pencil. London: The Religious Tract Society. p. 209. OCLC 1084932242. OL 22892933M – via archive.org.
- Gulliver, F. P. (1 January 1899). "Shoreline Topography". Proceedings of the American Academy of Arts and Sciences. 34 (8). American Academy of Arts & Sciences: 175. doi:10.2307/20020880. ISSN 0199-9818. JSTOR 20020880 – via archive.org.
- Hall, Adrien; Fraser, Allen. "Sea Stacks". www.landforms.eu.
- Jack, William (1999) [1794]. Sinclair, Sir John (ed.). "Northmaven". The Statistical Account of Scotland Drawn up from the Communications of the Ministers of the Different Parishes. 12 (27). University of Edinburgh, University of Glasgow: Edinburgh: William Creech: 349. OCLC 1045293275 – via The Statistical Accounts of Scotland online service.
- Jakobsen, Jakob (1897). "The old Shetland place-names". The dialect and place names of Shetland; two popular lectures (Lecture). Cornell University Library. Lerwick: Lerwick, T. & J. Manson. p. 103. LCCN 03002186 – via archive.org.
- Krauskopf, Sharma (n.d.). "Poor Dore Holm". Rampant Scotland. Lighthouse Letters By Sharma Krauskopf – via Scottish Radiance e-magazine.
- Low, George (1879). "Northmaven". A tour through the islands of Orkney an Schetland containing hints relative to their ancient modern and natural history collected in 1774. Introduction by Joseph Anderson. Kirkwall: William Peace & Son. p. 134. LCCN 03029104. OCLC 1040552515 – via archive.org. "these called the Drong look like a small fleet of wherries with barked sails;"
- Manson, Thomas Mortimer Yule (1933). Mansons' Guide to Shetland (3rd ed.). Lerwick: T. & J. Manson. OCLC 1007883604.
- Whitworth, Al, ed. (n.d.). "The Drongs". Shetland Climbing.
- The Drongs, Hillswick, Shetland Isles (Postcard). 10051. London: Raphael Tuck & Sons. c. 1920 [1903]. nby_LL11565.
- "Hillswick - Eshaness". Shetland.org.
- "drangr sb. m., drangur (ONP)". ONP: Dictionary of Old Norse Prose.
