= Linga, Scalloway Islands =

Small island off Hildasay in the Shetland Islands

Coordinates: 60°8′25″N 1°20′51″W

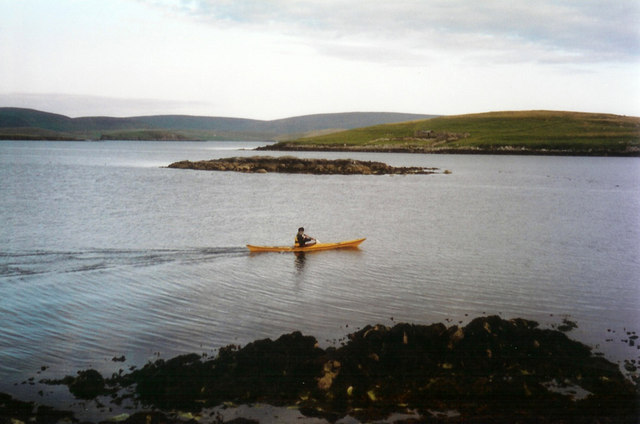
Linga, from Hildasay with The Skerry in between.

Linga is a small island off Hildasay in the Shetland Islands. It is one of the Scalloway Islands. Haswell-Smith compares Hildasay and the adjacent islands to a yeti's footprint, with Linga as the big toe.

Between Linga and Hildasay lie the Hogg of Linga, the Hogg of Hildasay and "the Skerry".

In the 19th century, like neighbouring Hildasay, it was inhabited and constituted its own croft. At the censuses of 1871 and 1881, the population numbered 12 and 10, respectively.

Papa and Oxna are a few miles to the south.

== Development Plans ==
As of July 2021, Monaco-based entrepreneur, John Scott plans to restore the ruined crofts on Linga.
