= Trondra =

One of the Scalloway Islands in Scotland

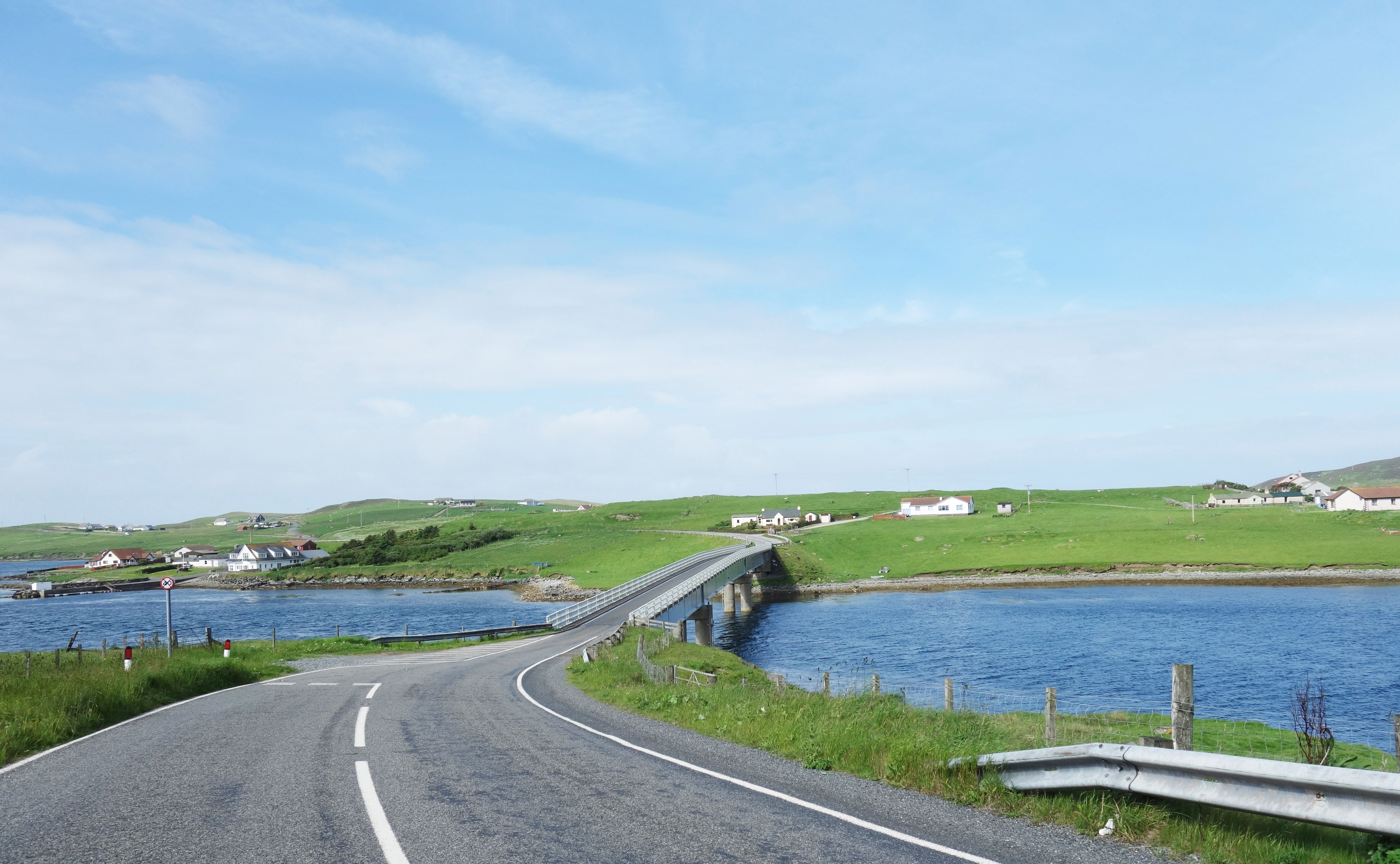
- The Trondra Bridge

Location
- Trondra shown within Shetland
- OS grid reference: HU398371
- Coordinates: 60.12°N 01.28°W

Name
- Name meaning: Possibly 'boar island' or from the personal name Þrondr
- Old Norse name: Uncertain

Physical geography
- Island group: Shetland
- Area: 275 hectares (1.06 sq mi)
- Area rank: 90=
- Highest elevation: 60 metres (197 ft)

Administration
- Council area: Shetland Islands
- Country: Scotland
- Sovereign state: United Kingdom

Demographics
- Population: 152
- Population rank: 39
- Population density: 55.3 people/km^{2}

Trondra (Shaetlan pronunciation: ['trɒːndrə] TROND-rə) is one of the Scalloway Islands, a subgroup of the Shetland Islands in Scotland. It shelters the harbour of Scalloway and has an area of 275 hectares (1.06 sq mi).

== History ==
Trondra was becoming rapidly depopulated until 1970, when road bridges were built to neighbouring Burra (West and East) and to the southern peninsula of the Shetland Mainland. Since then the population has recovered from a low of 20 in 1961.

A local community hall was opened in 1986.

== Geography ==
The main settlement on the island is Cauldhame, which is west of Cutts, located close to the bridge to mainland Shetland.

== Geology ==
Trondra is made up of steeply inclined Dalradian rocks; mainly quartz and mica rich schists but with some crystalline limestone in the north which provide fertile soils around Cauldhame and Cutts. The hills are covered in grass and heather, with trees being few and far between, much like the rest of the Shetland Islands.

== Wildlife ==
Trondra supports a number of seabirds including many gulls and black guillemots.

There are many fields of sheep and a few of Shetland ponies throughout the island. There is a variety of other wildlife present on and around the isle, such as hedgehogs, sparrows, starlings, seals and porpoises.

== Leisure activities ==
Trondra has 2 rowing teams, male and female, which compete in the summertime rowing regattas around Shetland and the annual 'Round Trondra Race'.

Da Peerie Neep, 'The Little Turnip' is a recently founded annual event which takes place in the Trondra hall and involves various neep related events such as "Toss the Neep".

Trondra usually enters a male and female squad in the Scalloway Fire Festival, which takes place in early January each year.

The Burland Croft Trail was one of Shetland's most popular tourist attractions until its closure in 2020.
