= Kettla Ness =

Tied island in Shetland

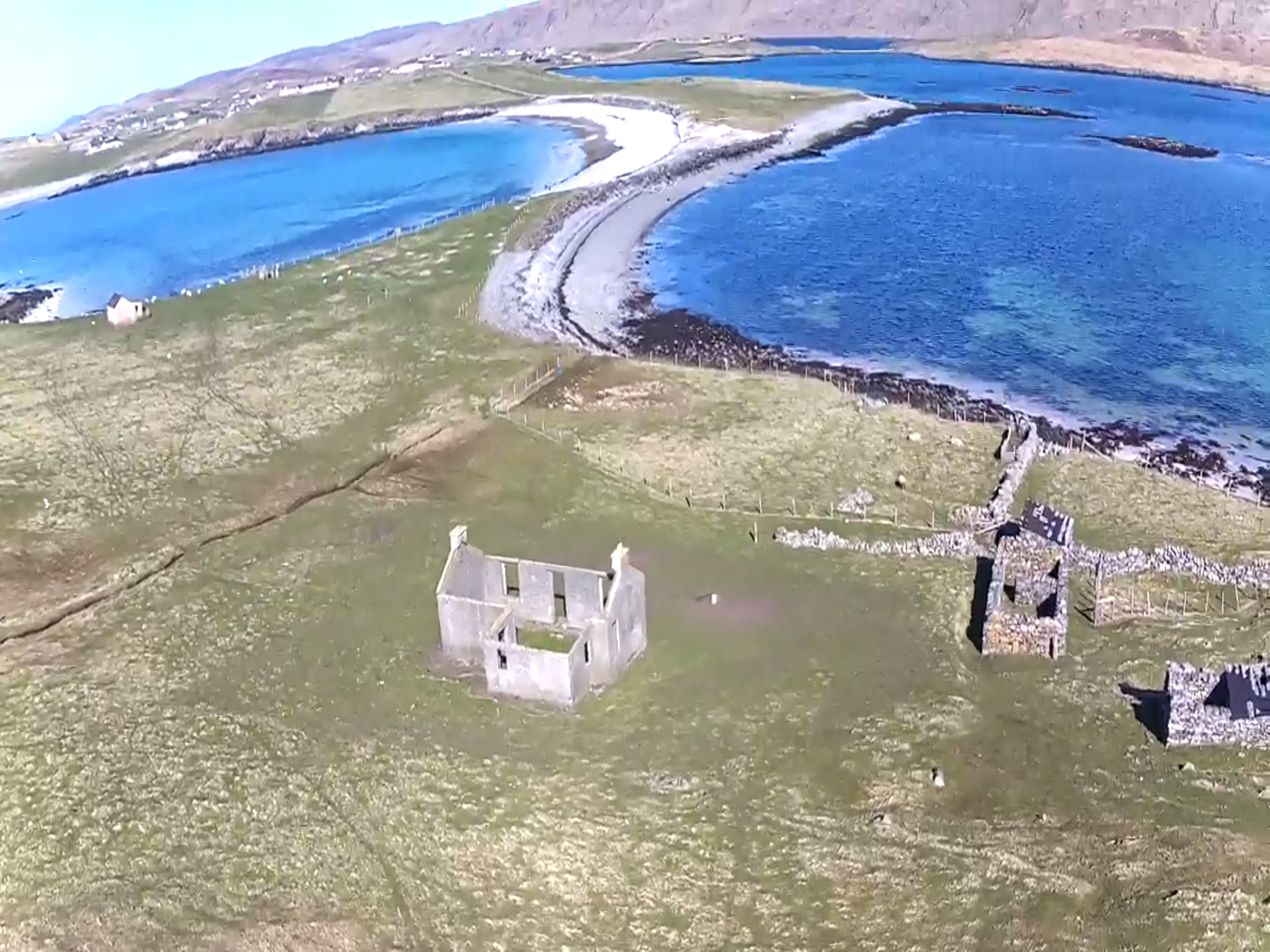
- Kettla Ness seen from the air, including Minn beach

Location
- Kettla Ness shown within Shetland
- OS grid reference: HU425815
- Coordinates: 60.05°N 1.35°W

Name
- Name meaning: Kettle or cauldron island
- Old Norse name: Ketlnes

Physical geography
- Island group: Scalloway Islands
- Area: see West Burra
- Highest elevation: 48.8 metres (160 ft)

Administration
- Council area: Shetland Islands
- Country: Scotland
- Sovereign state: United Kingdom

Demographics
- Population: 0

Kettla Ness, Kettlaness or just Kettla is a tied island and headland in Shetland. It is connected by the tombolo Minn beach (Banna Minn), to the south end of West Burra, part of the Scalloway Islands. The headland itself is conspicuous and circa 160 feet high. The island is accessible to walkers via Minn beach and is now uninhabitated. It is principally used for Sheep farming and pasture.

== History ==
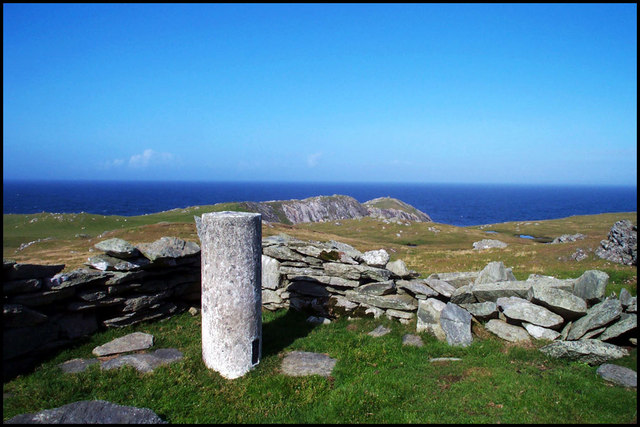
Kettla Ness Triangulation Pillar

The former settlements of Minn, Gossigarth and Point of Guide lie on the north-west part of the island. The ruined village was principally abandoned following the Highland Clearances in the 19th century although some occupation continued into the early 20th century. There are several other instances of prehistoric activity on the island, primarily at Minn, including several 3rd-1st millennium BC house, cairns, burnt mounds, cists, crop marks and other structures. Several of these are located in the Bight of the Sandy Geos, an area on the eastern side of Kettla Ness. Iron-age pottery fragments have also been found around Sandy Geos.

On the south side of Kettla Ness is a stream flowing from the Outra Loch. Along the stream there are numerous examples of ruined historic horizontal watermills that extend down to Groot Ness on the south coast.

In 1959, a triangulation pillar was erected on the island.

To the west of the island is the wreck of the boat 'Saint Kentigern' which ran aground in November 1979.

== Geology and Fauna ==
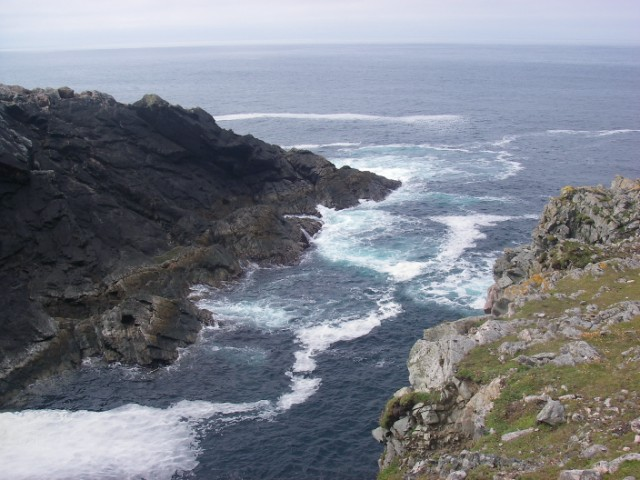
Inlet at Kettla Ness. Much of the rocky coast is formed from micaceous psammites of the Colla Firth Group - a suite of rocks which have been equated with the Dalradian succession of the Scottish Highlands

There are four small lochs on the island: Virda Vatn, Loch of Annyeruss, Outra Loch and Croo Loch.

Flora on Kettla Ness includes Armeria maritima which is extensive on the south-west coast opposite the Rod Skerries.

== Fugla Stack ==
To the west of Kettla Ness is Fugla Stack, a geological stack landform that consists of vertical columns of rock. There is a wreck, the MV Castor, dating to 1910, beside the stack.
