= Cheynies =

Group of reefs and small islands in the Shetland Islands, Scotland

Coordinates: 60°08′N 1°22′W

The Cheynies are a group of reefs and small islands, between Oxna and Hildasay in the Shetland Islands, Scotland. They have been considerably eroded in the historic past, and some of the islands are still connected at low tides. They are about twenty hectares in area.

== Wreck ==
In September, 2005, the ship Anglian Sovereign collided with the islands , losing vast amounts of diesel that contaminated over 200 birds. She was heading for Scalloway Harbour. The skipper was given six months custodial sentence in non-consecutive terms for pollution. He was the first person in Scotland to be charged with this.
