= Cutts, Shetland =

Coordinates: 60.128°N 1.275°W

Cutts
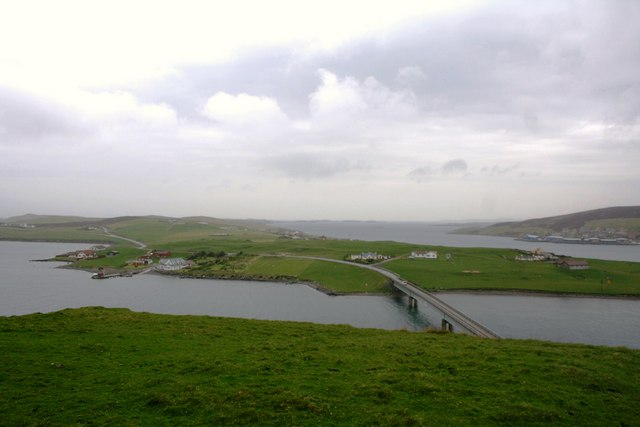
- The Trondra Bridge, with Cutts to the left, viewed from Easterhoull

- Location within Shetland
- OS grid reference: HU402383
- Civil parish: Tingwall
- Council area: Shetland
- Lieutenancy area: Shetland
- Country: Scotland
- Sovereign state: United Kingdom
- Post town: SHETLAND
- Postcode district: ZE1
- Dialling code: 01595
- Police: Scotland
- Fire: Scottish
- Ambulance: Scottish
- UK Parliament: Orkney and Shetland
- Scottish Parliament: Shetland

Cutts is a settlement in the Shetland Islands, United Kingdom. It is on the island of Trondra off the west coast of Shetland Mainland. The B9074 crosses the Trondra Bridge at the north-east of Cutts. The bridge, opened on 18 October 1971 by George Younger, has a single carriageway and connects Trondra with Shetland Mainland.
