= Linga, Busta Voe =

Uninhabited island in the Shetland Islands

Linga
Location
- Linga shown within Shetland
- OS grid reference: HU354639
- Coordinates: 60.36°N 1.35°W

Name
- Name meaning: "heather island"
- Old Norse name: lyngey

Physical geography
- Island group: Shetland
- Area: 70 hectares (0.27 sq mi)
- Area rank: 171=
- Highest elevation: 69 metres (226 ft)

Administration
- Council area: Shetland Islands
- Country: Scotland
- Sovereign state: United Kingdom

Demographics
- Population: 0

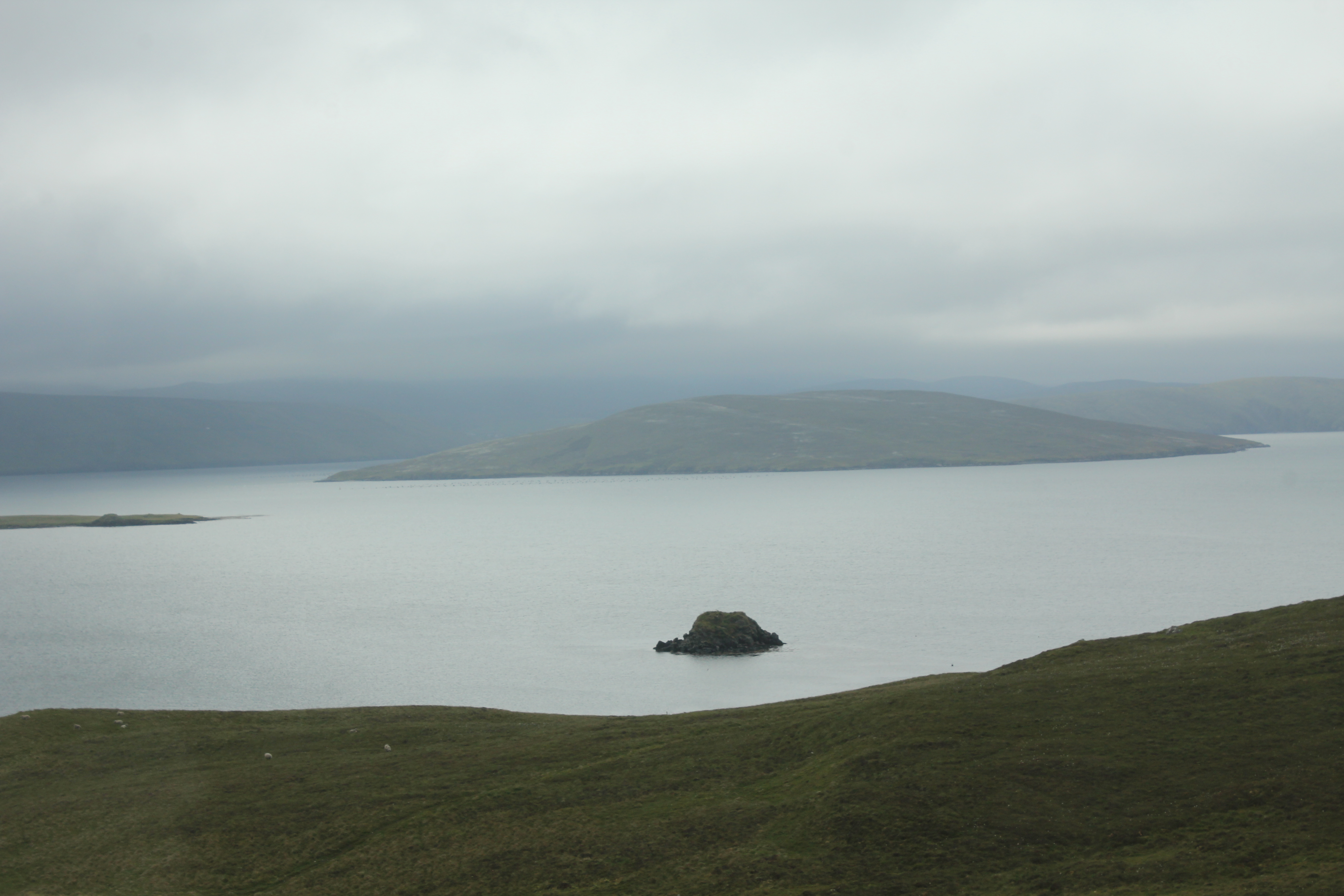

Linga is a small, uninhabited island, 1 km (0.62 mi) east of Muckle Roe in the Shetland Islands. The island is roughly circular in shape and its highest elevation is 69 metres (226 ft). Its area is 70 hectares (0.27 sq mi).

== Geography and geology ==
Linga is almost completely round, with a central peak. It lies between the mouths of Olna Firth and Gon Firth on the west coast of the Shetland Mainland. To the north is Delting on the Mainland, and the Mainland is also to the south and east. Papa Little is to the south west, and Mavis Grind to the north.

There is a submerged rock known as Groin Baa to the north.

The island is composed of gneiss and schist, with some quartzite and pelite. Its landscape is one of rough grass and heather.
