= West Head of Papa =

Small tidal island off Papa in Shetland, one of the Scalloway Islands

Coordinates: 60°7′34″N 1°21′22″W

West Head of Papa is a small tidal island off Papa in Shetland, and is one of the Scalloway Islands. It is 21m at its highest point. East Head of Papa is part (peninsula) of Papa itself, so it is possible that West Head became separated in recent history.
