= Papa Little =

Island in St Magnus Bay, Shetland, Scotland

Papa Little (Scots)
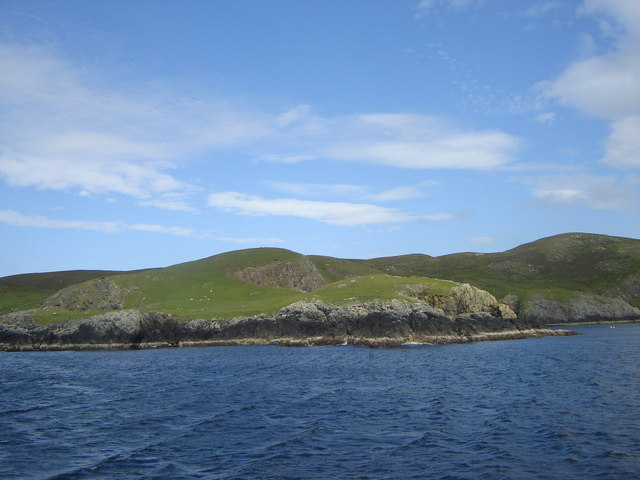
- Rit Ness, the northwest of Papa Little

Location
- Papa Little shown within Shetland
- OS grid reference: HU337610
- Coordinates: 60.33°N 01.39°W

Name
- Name meaning: Little island of the papar (priests)
- Old Norse name: Papey Litla

Physical geography
- Island group: Shetland
- Area: 226 ha (560 acres)
- Area rank: 102
- Highest elevation: North Ward 82 m

Administration
- Council area: Shetland Islands
- Country: Scotland
- Sovereign state: United Kingdom

Demographics
- Population: 0

Papa Little (Scots: Papa Little; Old Norse: Papey Litla, meaning "the little island of the priests") is an island in St Magnus Bay, Shetland, Scotland.

The island lies at the head of Aith Voe in north west Mainland, Shetland, south of Muckle Roe. It is largely peat-covered and has been uninhabited since the 1840s.

Its name means "little island of the papar" (as distinct from Papa Stour), who were Gaelic hermits or Culdees found as far north as Iceland.

== Notable people ==
- Elizabeth Balfour (midwife) (1832–1918)
