= Colsay =

Uninhabited island off the coast of Scotland

Coordinates: 59°57′06″N 1°21′23″W

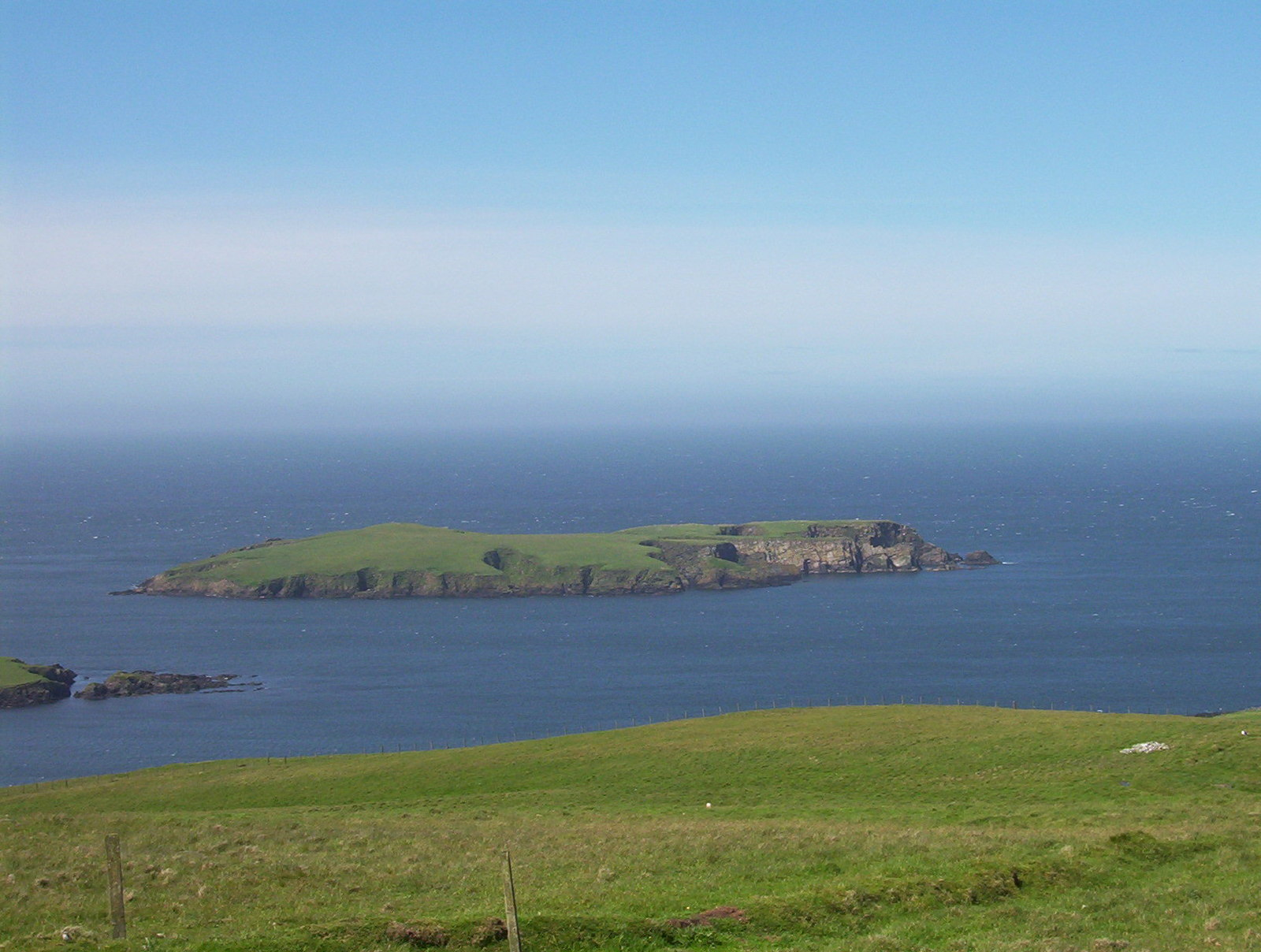
Colsay seen from the east

Colsay is an uninhabited island off the South West coast of Mainland, Shetland. Fora Ness lies to the south, across the Muckle Sound. The highest elevation is 44 metres (144 ft), and there is an ancient cairn on the summit.

It is in Dunrossness parish, 8 miles (13 km) NNW of Sumburgh Head. It used to pasture a good many sheep mostly Cheviot/Shetland cross breeds, which were transported to the island by small boats, called Yoals, from the nearby Spiggie Beach, and landed at the only decent landing place on the island, called the "Owsin Gaet".
