= Oxna =

One of the Scalloway Islands in Shetland, Scotland

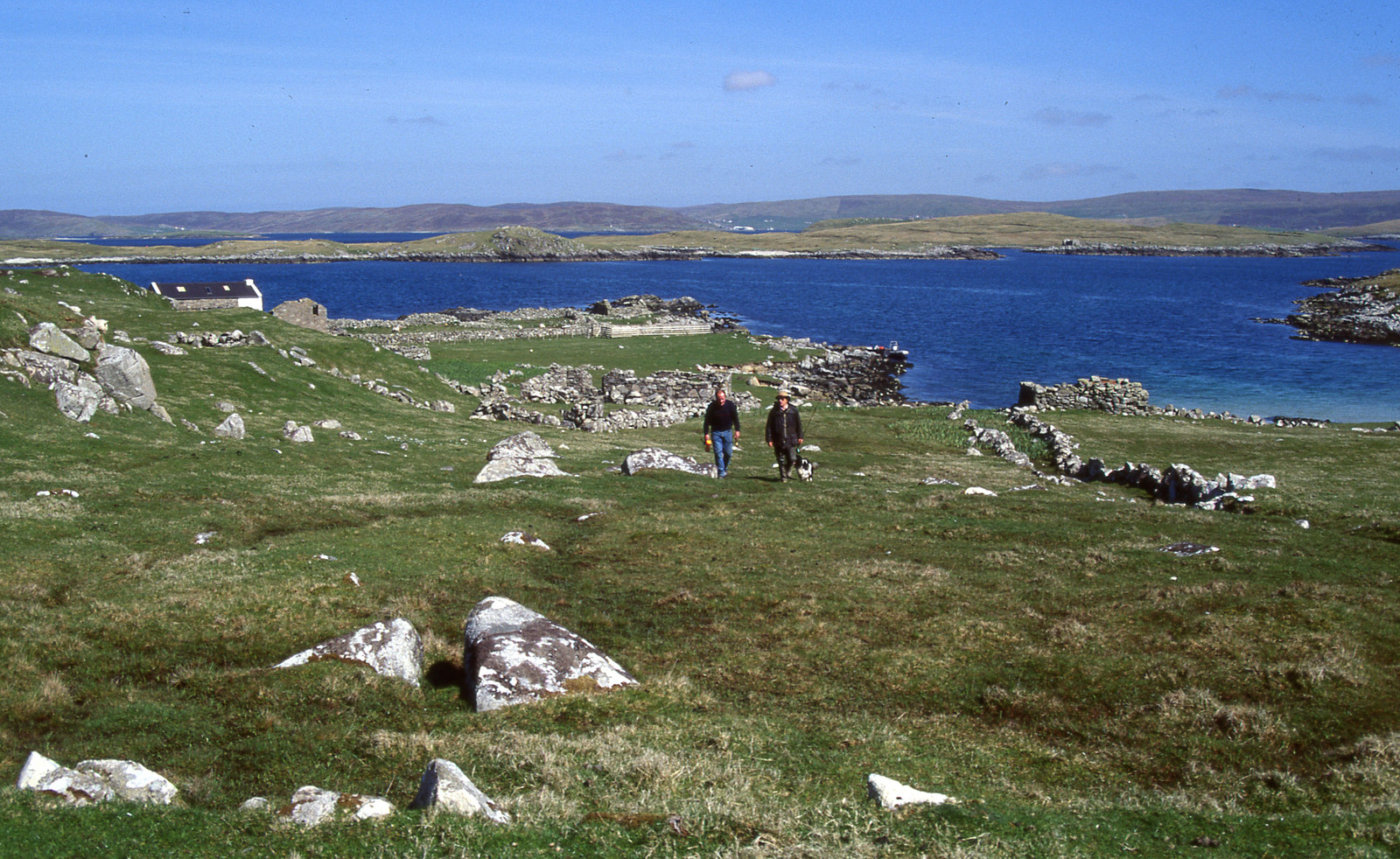
- View east towards Papa from Oxna

Location
- Oxna shown within Shetland
- OS grid reference: HU350372
- Coordinates: 60.12°N 1.37°W

Name
- Name meaning: "ox island"
- Old Norse name: yxn-øy

Physical geography
- Island group: Shetland
- Area: 68 ha (170 acres)
- Area rank: 177
- Highest elevation: 38 m (125 ft)

Administration
- Council area: Shetland Islands
- Country: Scotland
- Sovereign state: United Kingdom

Demographics
- Population: 0

Oxna is one of the Scalloway Islands, lying north west of Burra in Shetland, Scotland. Oxna has an area of 68 hectares (170 acres).

The island has been uninhabited since the First World War, but there is a house which is still used as a holiday home.

Papa island lies a few hundred metres to the east of Oxna's north coast.
