= Isle of Stenness =

Part of the Shetland Islands, Scotland

Coordinates: 60°28′N 1°37′W

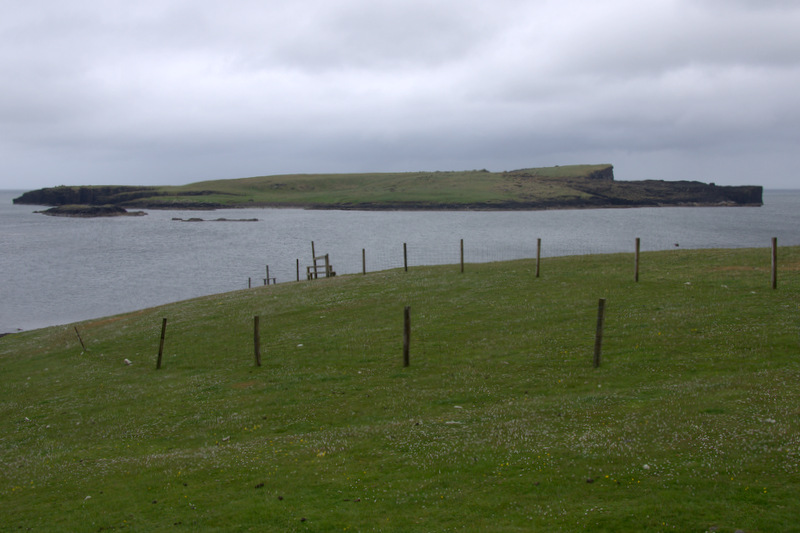
Isle of Stenness, viewed from the northeast

The Isle of Stenness is one of the Shetland Islands, Scotland. It is off north west Mainland in the Northmavine.

It sheltered the old fishing harbour at Esha Ness on the mainland. The Skerry of Eshaness and Dore Holm are not far away.

Joan Grigsby camped here in 1933, and wrote the book An Island Rooin about it.
