= Langa, Shetland =

Collective name for two uninhabited islands off Hildasay in Shetland, Scotland

Coordinates: 60°8′11″N 1°19′35″W

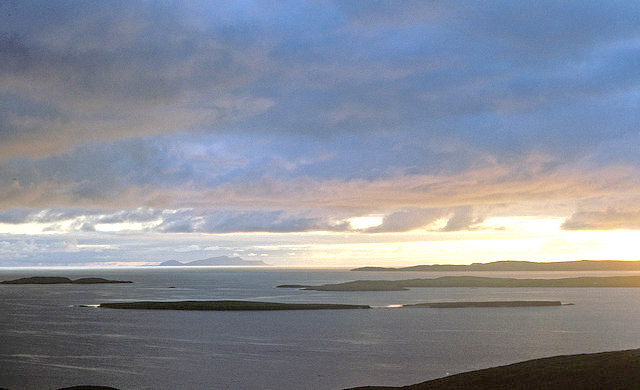
Langa viewed from the west

Langa (Old Norse: Langey) is the collective name for two uninhabited islands off Hildasay, in Shetland, Scotland. The islands are connected by a tombolo and are separated at high tide. It is not to be confused with the numerous islands called "Linga" in Shetland (- for which see Linga (disambiguation) or Lunga).

== History ==
The name probably derives from langey, Old Norse for "long island".

The island was a separate croft during the 19th century. It had a recorded population of nine in 1841, and 13 in 1881, but was deserted in the 1890s.
