= Linga (near Vementry) =

One of the Shetland Islands near Vementry

Coordinates: 60°18′54″N 1°29′17″W

Location
- Linga shown within the Shetland Islands
- OS grid reference: HU283591

Physical geography
- Island group: Shetland Islands

Administration
- Council area: Shetland Islands
- Country: Scotland
- Sovereign state: United Kingdom

Demographics
- Population: 0

Linga is one of the Shetland Islands, near Vementry. It is one of many islands in Shetland called Linga. The island is uninhabited.

== Geography and geology ==
Linga's rock is schist and gneiss.

The islands of Gruna and the Heag (another common Shetland name) are to the North.

Brindister on the mainland is nearby.
