= Broch of West Burrafirth =

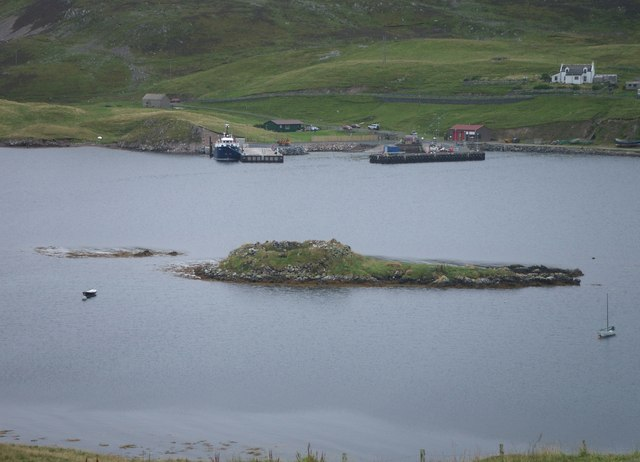
- Remains of the broch on the little holm

- Location within Shetland
- 60°17′53″N 1°32′18″W
- Type: Broch
- Periods: Iron Age
- Location: Mainland, Shetland

The Broch of West Burrafirth is an Iron Age broch located on the west side of Mainland, Shetland (grid reference HU25625720).

== Location ==
The broch stands on a low rocky islet (the "Holm of Hebrista") in West Burra Firth. The site is inaccessible without a boat except at very low tide. There was once a causeway from the islet to the shore, which is no longer readily apparent.

== Description ==
The broch is in a ruined state with much fallen debris. The entrance is blocked with stones but the lintel over the inner end is still apparent. There appear to be two guard cells on either side of the entrance passage. Internally four mural cells can be seen, two of which are dumb-bell shaped with short passages between the two halves. The site is a scheduled monument.

== Later history ==
The Orkneyinga saga states of Magnus Erlendsson and Hákon Paulsson:

"Magnus and Hákon ruled their lands and defended them for some time, the two agreeing very well... They also slew a famous man, named Þorbjörn in Borgarfjörð in Hjaltland."

Borgarfjörð, the "fjord of the borg" was so named by the Norse on account of the broch. It is probable that the reason of Þorbjörn's connection with Borgarfjörð/Burra Firth was its affording him, and his followers a shelter, and a defensive position in the borg, or broch. The old name Borgarfjörð occurs in a document in the Norse language dated 1299.

The broch was visited by George Low in the 18th century, when he noted a number of cells in the base of the wall, and he stated that a hollow, galleried wall began above these.
