= Papa, Shetland =

Island in the Scalloway Islands, Shetland, Scotland

Papa
Papa (Scots)
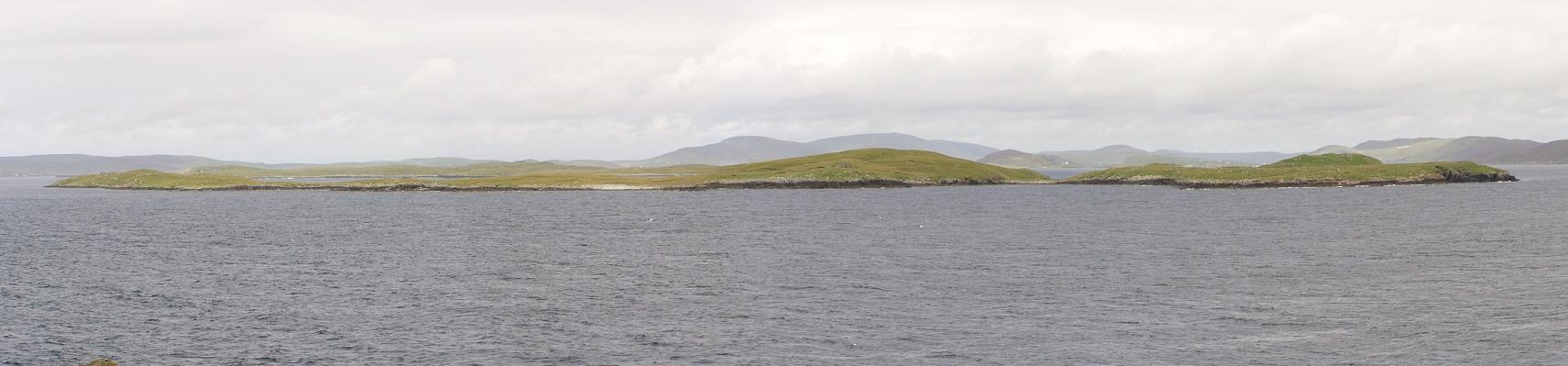
- Papa, seen from the south

Location
- Papa shown within Shetland
- OS grid reference: HU364376
- Coordinates: 60.12°N 1.34°W

Name
- Name meaning: Island of the papar
- Old Norse name: Papey

Physical geography
- Island group: Shetland
- Area: 59 ha (146 acres)
- Area rank: 183=
- Highest elevation: 32 m (105 ft)

Administration
- Council area: Shetland Islands
- Country: Scotland
- Sovereign state: United Kingdom

Demographics
- Population: 0

Papa (Scots: Papa; Old Norse: Papey, meaning "the island of the priests") is an uninhabited island in the Scalloway Islands, Shetland, Scotland.

Papa lies north west of Burra and east of Oxna in the Shetland Islands. The population was 20 in 1871, 14 in 1881 and 23 in 1891. The last residents left between 1891 and 1930. Most habitation was on the eastern end of the island, the peninsula East Head of Papa. A beached loch and a low area divide the island nearly into three separate parts.
