= Little Havra =

Small island off the west of South Mainland in Shetland

Coordinates: 60°1′14″N 1°22′4″W

Little Havra is a small island off the west of South Mainland in Shetland. It is 35 metres (115 ft) at its highest point, upon which there is a cairn. It is located west of South Havra.
