= Dore Holm =

Islet in Shetland, Scotland, United Kingdom

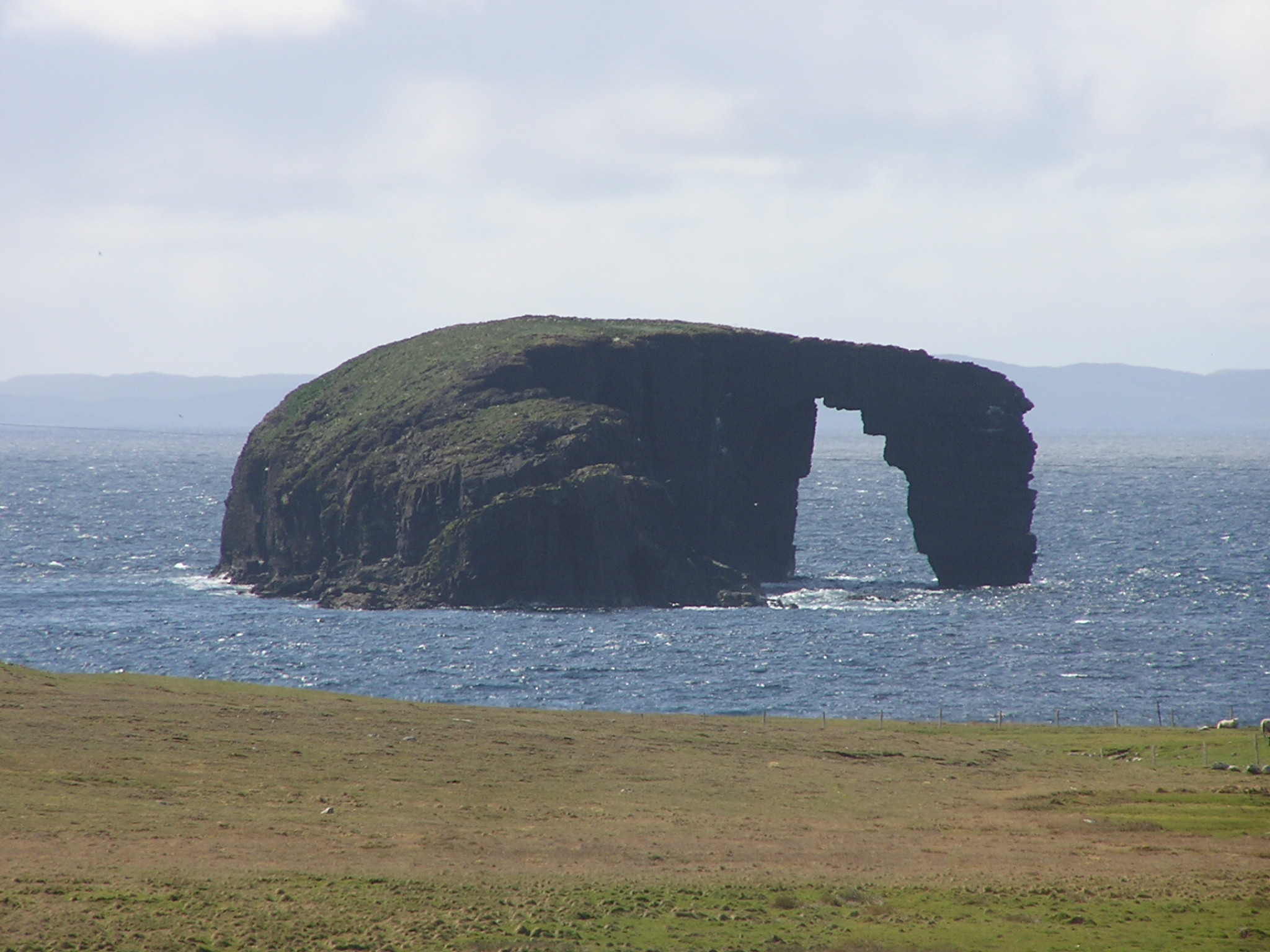

Location
- Dore Holm shown within Shetland
- Coordinates: 60°28′10″N 01°36′11″W

Name
- Name meaning: Door isle

Administration
- Council area: Shetland
- Country: Scotland
- Sovereign state: United Kingdom

Demographics
- Population: 0

The Dore Holm (Shaetlan pronunciation: [ˌdoər ˈhɒm] dor-HOM) is a small uninhabited islet off the south coast of Esha Ness, located in the north-west of Mainland, Shetland, Scotland. Its natural arch can be seen from the coast between Tangwick and Stenness. The shape of the arch has been compared to a horse drinking deeply from the water.

The name appears to be derived from 'door', the word 'holm' being of Scandinavian origin and meaning a small island.

== Sources ==
- This article incorporates text from Shetlopedia
