= Muckle Roe =

Island in Scotland

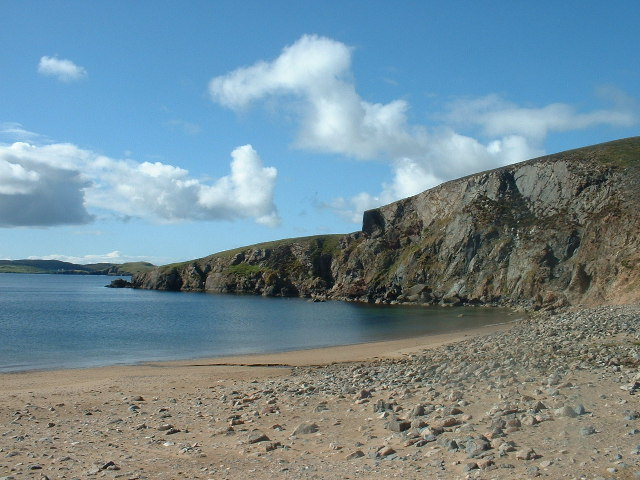
- Muckle Ayre

Location
- Muckle Roe shown within the Shetland Islands
- OS grid reference: HU317650
- Coordinates: 60°22′N 1°25.5′W

Name
- Name meaning: big red island
- Old Norse name: Rauðøy Mikla

Physical geography
- Island group: Shetland
- Area: 1,773 hectares (6.8 sq mi)
- Area rank: 37
- Highest elevation: Mid Ward 172 metres (564 ft)

Administration
- Council area: Shetland Islands
- Country: Scotland
- Sovereign state: United Kingdom

Demographics
- Population: 128
- Population rank: 42
- Population density: 7.2people/km^{2}
- Muckle Roe Lighthouse; Swarbacks Minn
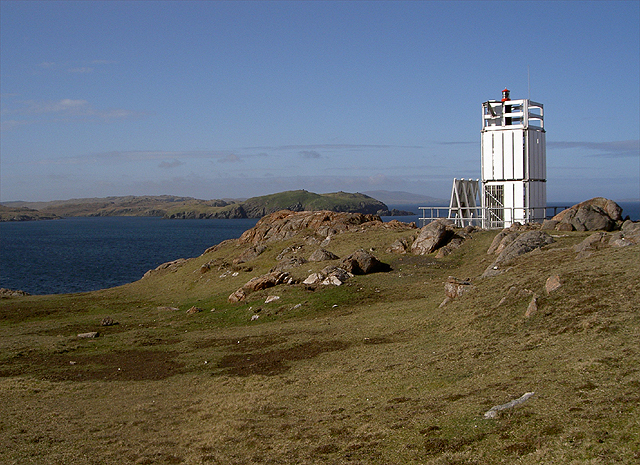
- Muckle Roe Lighthouse
- Coordinates: 60°20′57″N 1°27′03″W
- Constructed: 1897 (first)
- Foundation: concrete base
- Construction: metal skeletal tower (current) cast iron tower (first)
- Height: 7 metres (23 ft) (current); 8 metres (26 ft) (first)
- Shape: quadrangular tower covered by aluminium panels with light on the top (current) octagonal tower with balcony and lantern
- Markings: white tower
- Power source: solar power
- Operator: Northern Lighthouse Board
- First lit: 2001 (current)
- Deactivated: 2001 (first)
- Focal height: 30 metres (98 ft) (current)
- Lens: 3rd order Fresnel lens (first)
- Range: 9 nmi (17 km; 10 mi) (white), 6 nmi (11 km; 6.9 mi) (red)
- Characteristic: Fl WR 3s.

Muckle Roe (Shaetlan pronunciation: [ˌmɔkəɫ ˈrøː]) is an island in Shetland, Scotland, in St. Magnus Bay, to the west of Mainland. It has a population of around 130 people, who mainly croft and live in the south east of the island.

'Muckle' is Scots for 'big' or 'great'.

== History ==
The island is referred to in the Orkneyinga saga.

In 1905 a bridge was built between Muckle Roe and the Shetland Mainland over Roe Sound at a cost of £1,020 met from public subscription and a grant from the Congested Districts Board. The construction was of iron and concrete and its completion was followed by a reversal in the population decline seen in the 19th and earlier 20th centuries. The bridge was later widened and strengthened, and opened on 22 October 1947 by the Convener of Zetland, W. Thomson Esq. Construction of a replacement bridge commenced in May 1998, the work being completed in January 1999. It was opened officially by Councillor Drew Ratter on 3 April 1999.

Muckle Roe was part of the civil parish of Delting until the abolition of civil parishes in Scotland by the Local Government (Scotland) Act 1929.

== Geography and geology ==
Muckle Roe is approximately 3 miles (4.8 km) in diameter, with high cliffs in the south. Its highest point is Mid Ward 172 metres (564 ft). It is the seventh largest of the Shetland islands.

The island's rock is red granite, which gives the island its name – a combination of Scots and Old Norse meaning "big red island".

There are crofts in the east and south east. The rest of the island is lochan-studded moorland.

== Population ==
Muckle Roe population
1851	290
1871	216
1881	230
1961	103
1971	94
1981	101
1991	115
2001	104
2011	130
2022	128

== Notable residents ==
Gilbert Williamson Wood (2 September 1828 – 24 September 1886), a merchant seaman, was born at Little Ayre and emigrated to Adelaide, Australia in 1853. He founded G. Wood, Son & Co. along with his eldest son Peter in 1876. The company produced goods under a number of brand names, including Anchor, Snowflake, Viking, and Medallion. He donated sums of money back to Muckle Roe, including funds towards the building of the first bridge to mainland Shetland, and the Muckle Roe Church of Scotland, which was completed in 1911. The remaining funds were used to purchase books and school bags for every child attending the local school. Some profits from the sale of Anchor butter went towards paraffin lamps for the chapel.

== Gallery ==
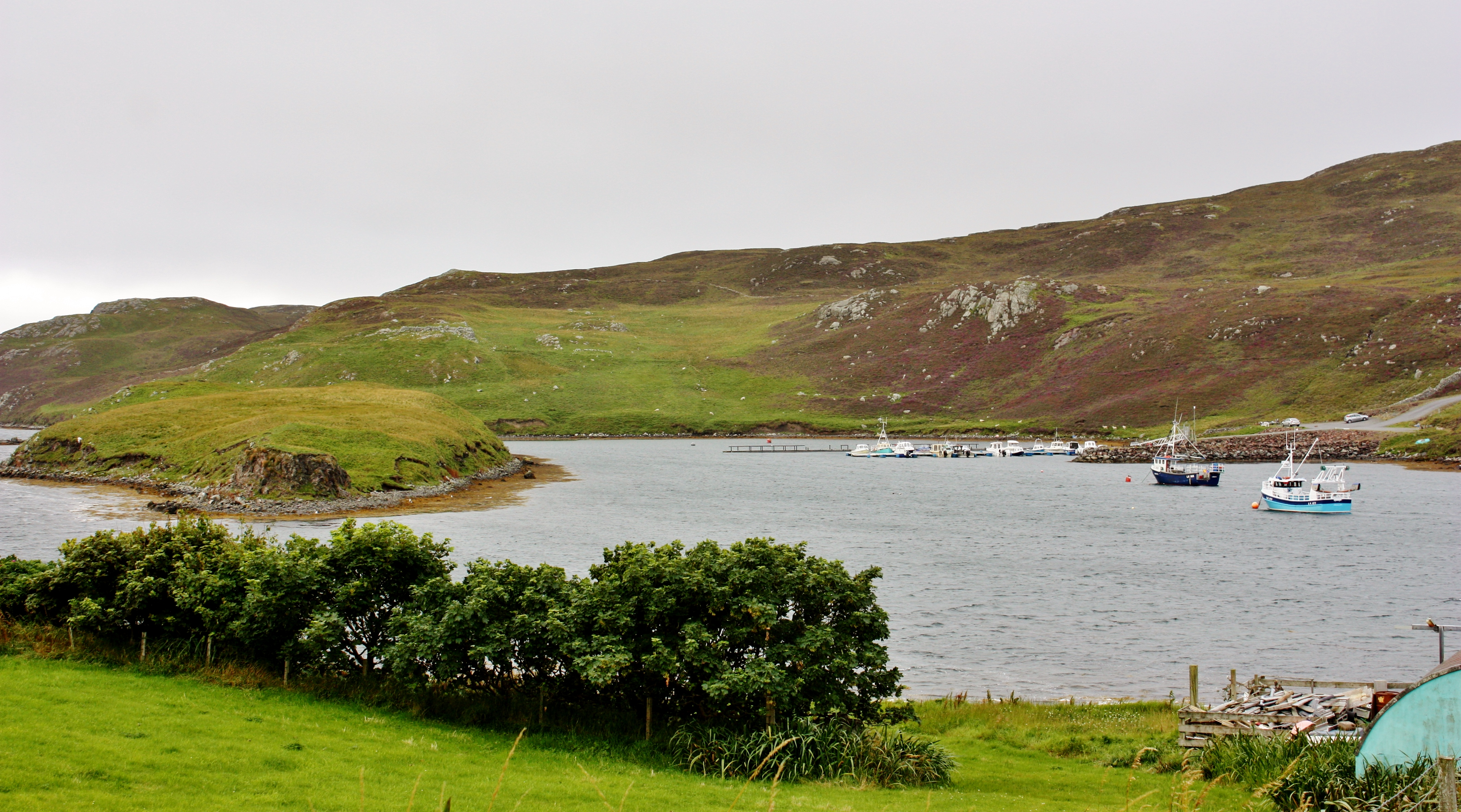
Roesound

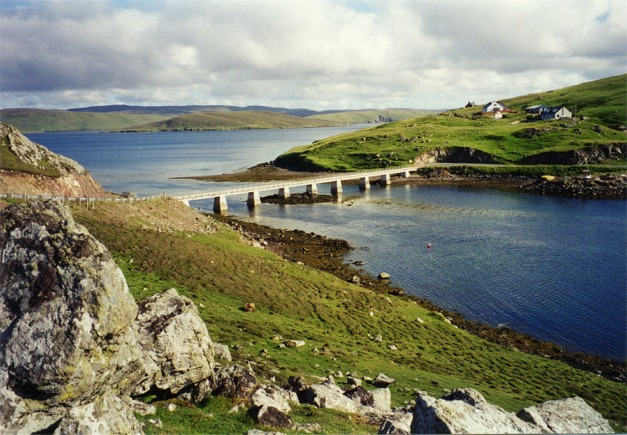
Former Muckle Roe Bridge

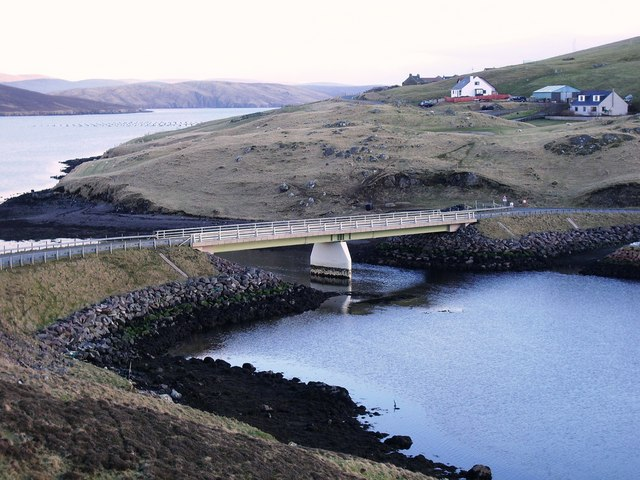
Modern Muckle Roe Bridge

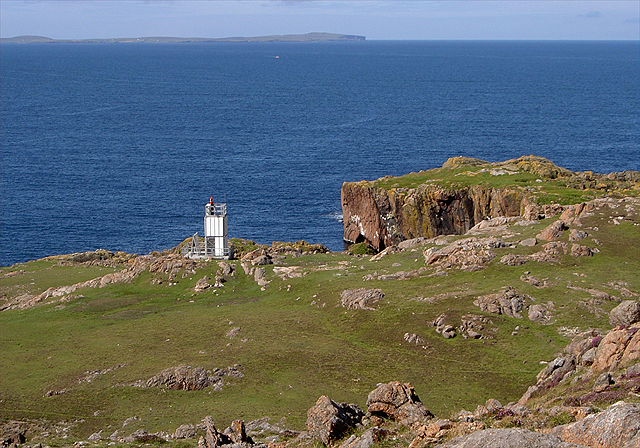
Muckle Roe Lighthouse looking west

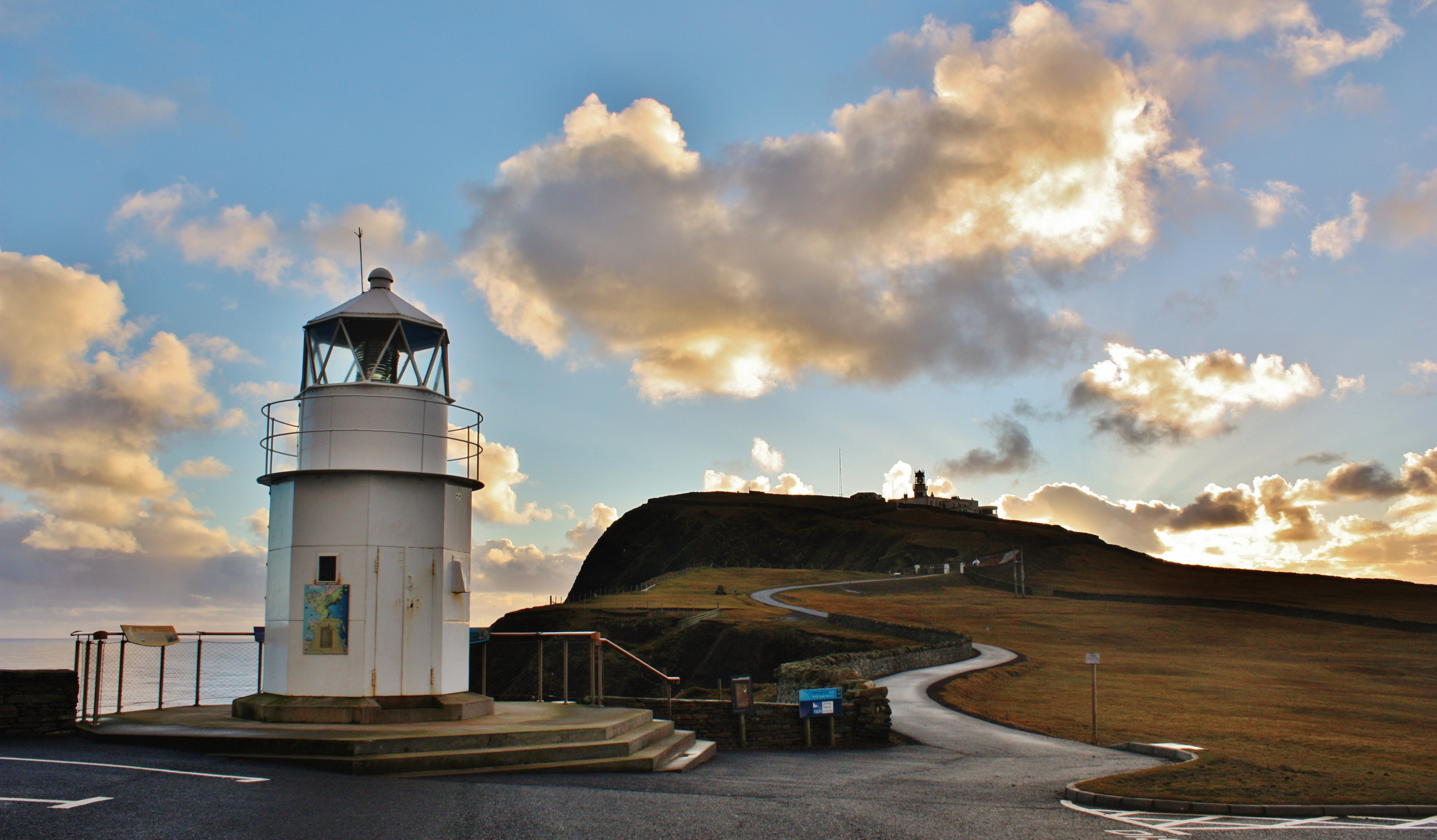
The former Muckle Roe Lighthouse, which now sits at the foot of Sumburgh Head

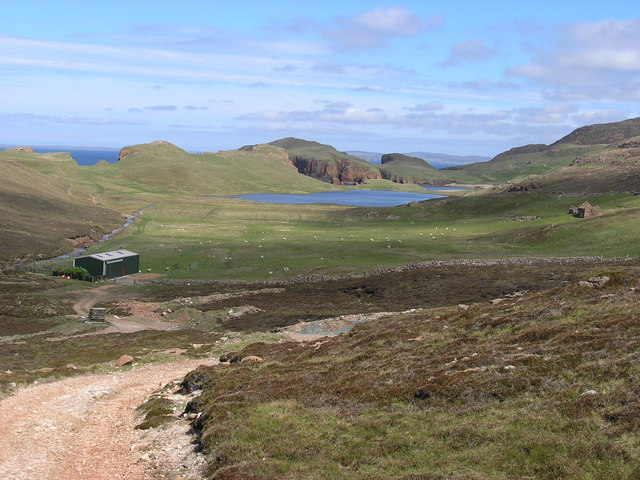
The North Ham and the Town Loch

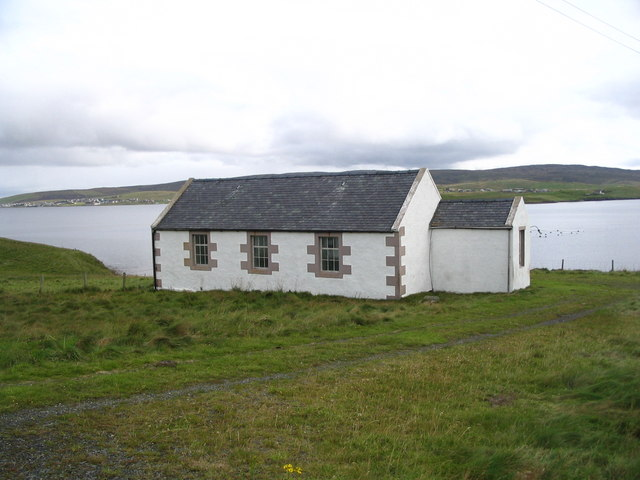
Muckle Roe Chapel

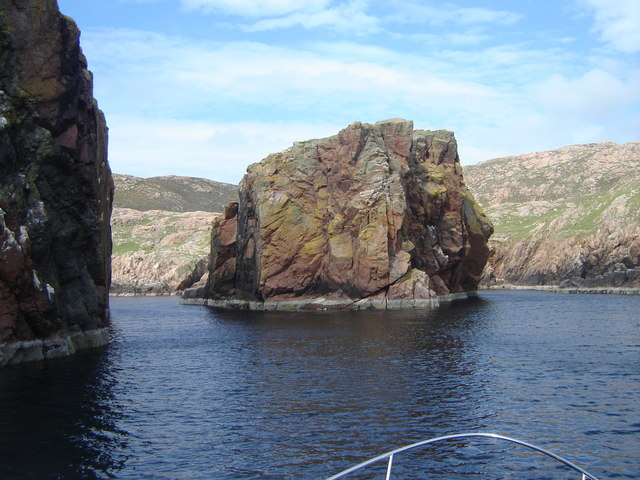
Murbie Stacks

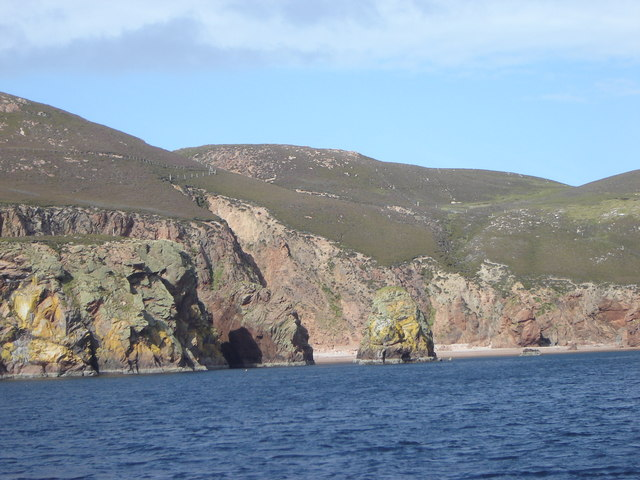
Birkie Ayre

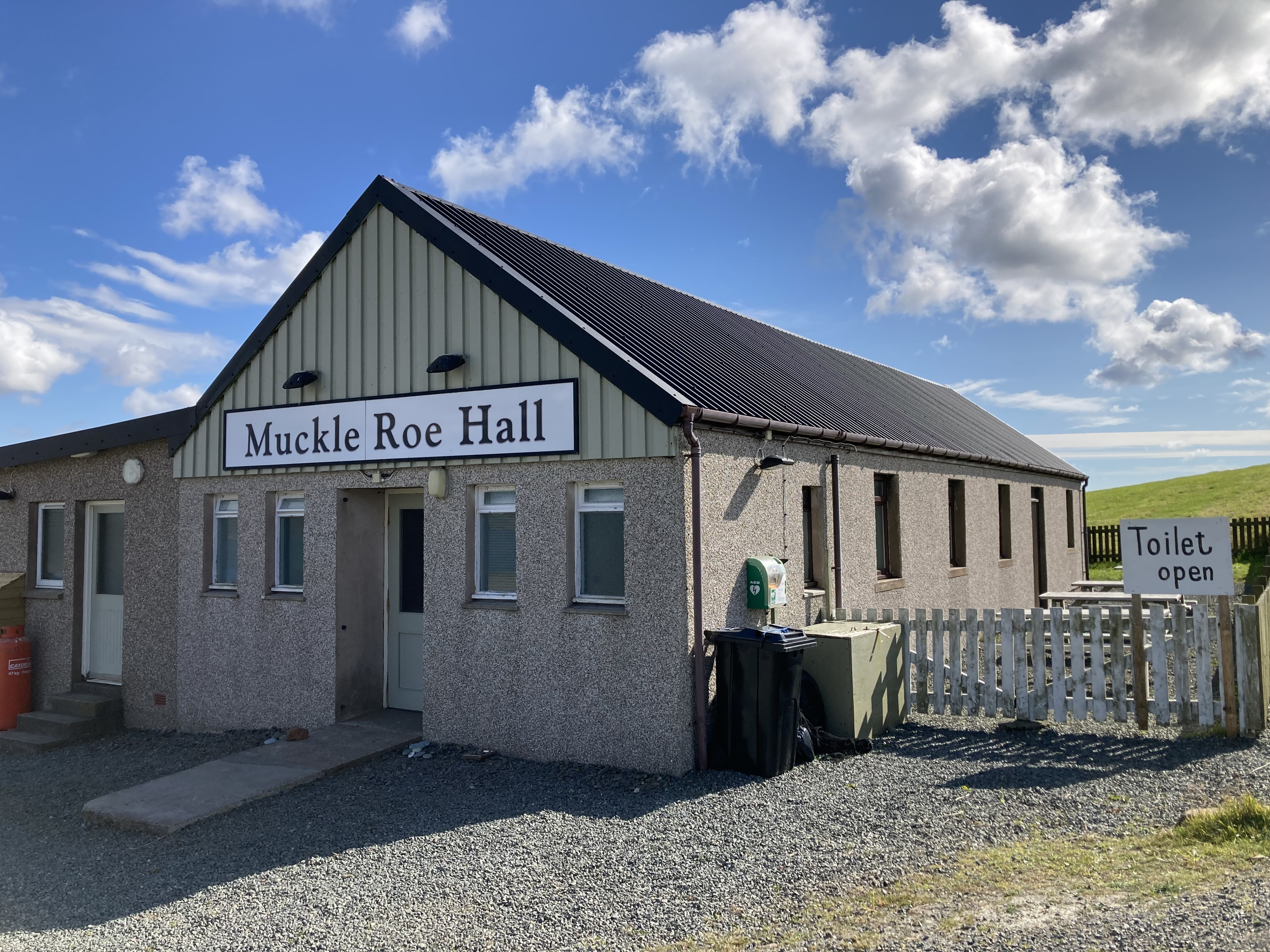
Muckle Roe Hall

== See also ==
- List of lighthouses in Scotland
- List of Northern Lighthouse Board lighthouses
