= West Burra =

One of the Scalloway Islands in Shetland, Scotland

Location
- West Burra shown within Shetland
- OS grid reference: HU368324
- Coordinates: 60.06°N 1.36°W

Name
- Name meaning: west broch island?
- Old Norse name: Barrey

Physical geography
- Island group: Shetland
- Area: 743 ha (2 7/8 sq mi)
- Area rank: 62
- Highest elevation: 65 m (213 ft)

Administration
- Council area: Shetland Islands
- Country: Scotland
- Sovereign state: United Kingdom

Demographics
- Population: 772
- Population rank: 17
- Population density: 104/km^{2} (270/sq mi)
- Largest settlement: Hamnavoe

West Burra (Shaetlan pronunciation: ['wast ˌbɔrə] WAST BURR-ə) is one of the Scalloway Islands, a subgroup of the Shetland Islands in Scotland. It is the largest island in the Scalloway Islands. There are several prehistoric sites on the island.

== Geography ==
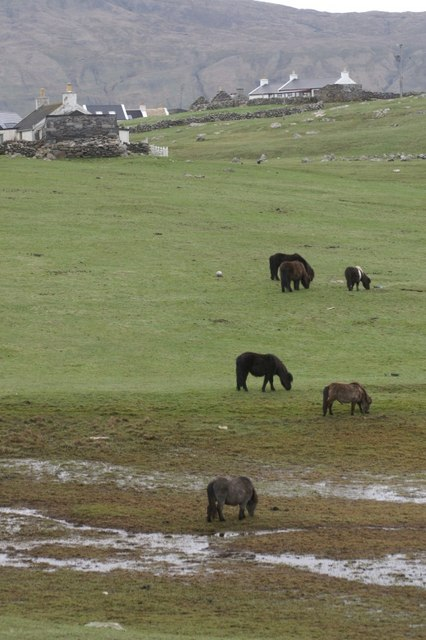
Shetland ponies grazing near Papil

West Burra is to the west of the main Shetland island. The island is 18 kilometers (11 mi) in length and has an average width of 2 kilometers (1.2 mi). The Hill of Sandwick is the highest point of the island at 65 meters (213 ft). West Burra is the largest island in the Scalloway Islands.

A blanket bog was laid down around 1400 BC.

== History ==
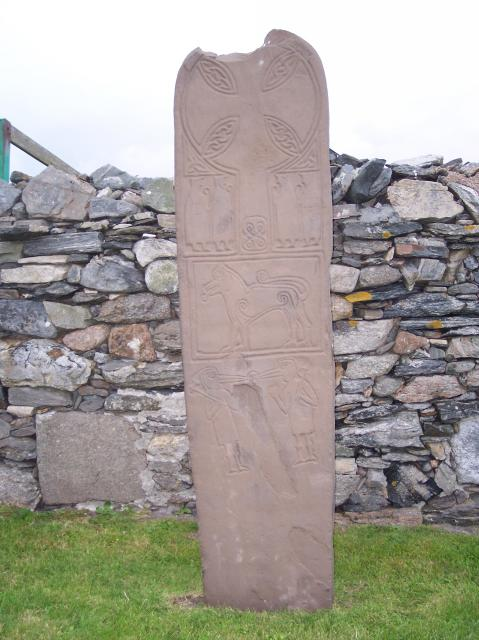
Replica of the Papil Stone dating from 2000. The original (from 700 AD) is in the National Museum of Scotland.

A survey by Gordon Parry in 1977 reported that there were three prehistoric sites per square kilometre on West Burra. Roundhouses were first constructed in the area between 700–500 BC.

The form used in the Orkneyinga saga is "Barrey". Collins Encyclopedia of Scotland suggests that Burra is a corruption of Borgarey meaning "island of the broch". The place name Brough lends some support to this case and a nearby hillock may have been a broch from which stones were removed to build the pier at Scalloway.

The name Papil in the south of West Burra is a Norse reference to the Papar. This name can be found in the form Papyli in several locations in Iceland. However, it is not just Papil's etymology that suggests the site of an early church, confirmation has been found in the form of the "Monk's Stone", which was dug up in Papil and which is now in the Shetland Museum.

== Infrastructure ==
A church was constructed in 1804. A road bridge connects West Burra to the mainland island.

== Population ==
West Burra had a population of 427 in 1882. The village of Hamnavoe is in the northern portion of the island.

== Notable people from West Burra ==
- Thomas Fraser, a Country and Western musician who was born at Outterabrake and lived much of his life at Setter.

== See also ==
- List of islands of Scotland

== Works cited ==
=== Books ===
- Lewis, Samuel (1846). A Topographical Dictionary of Scotland: Comprising the Several Counties, Islands, Cities, Burgh and Market Towns, Parishes, and Principal Villages, with Historical and Statistical Descriptions. S. Lewis & Company.
- Wilson, John (1882). The Gazetteer of Scotland. W. & A.K. Johnston.

=== Journals ===
- Hedges, J.; Bradley, R.; Davidson, D.; Dickson, C.; Jones, R.; Lehane, D.; Rees, S.; Rowley-Conwy, P.; Stenhosue, M. (1986). "Bronze Age Structures at Tougs, Burra Isle, Shetland". Glasgow Archaeological Journal. 13. Edinburgh University Press: 1–43. doi:10.2307/44944942. JSTOR 44944942.
- Hedges, John (1984). "Gordon Parry's West Burra Survey". Glasgow Archaeological Journal. 11. Edinburgh University Press: 41–59. doi:10.2307/44945077. JSTOR 44945077.
