= Linga, Yell Sound =

One of the Shetland Islands in Yell Sound

Linga
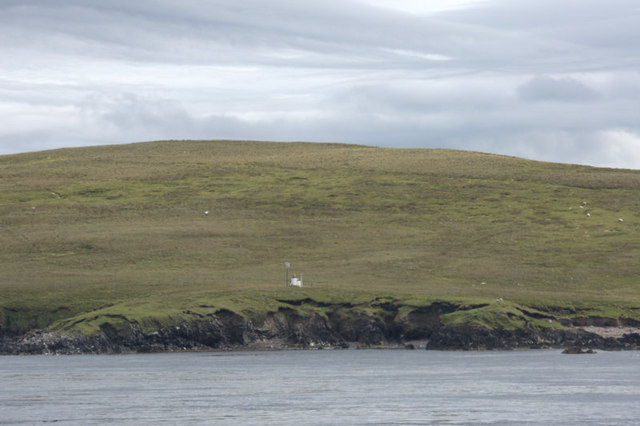
- North end of Linga

Location
- Linga shown within Shetland
- OS grid reference: HU466733
- Coordinates: 60.44°N 1.15°W

Name
- Name meaning: heather island
- Old Norse name: lyngey

Physical geography
- Island group: Shetland
- Area: 38 ha
- Highest elevation: 40 m (131 ft)

Administration
- Council area: Shetland Islands
- Country: Scotland
- Sovereign state: United Kingdom

Demographics
- Population: 0

Linga is one of the Shetland Islands, in Yell Sound.

== Geography and geology ==
Linga is an extremely common name in Shetland, meaning heather island. This Linga is not far from Firth and Firths Voe, in the West. Fish Holm is to the North and Lunna Ness to the east.

Linga is made of coarse gneiss, with some granite. It is about 43 ha in area and 40m at its highest point.
