= Braewick =

Braewick may refer to:

- Braewick, Sandsting, a settlement in the West Mainland, Shetland, Scotland
- Braewick, North Mainland, a farmstead in the North Mainland, Shetland, Scotland

== See also ==
- Breiwick, a village in the Central Mainland, Shetland, Scotland
- Breiwick Burn, Whalsay, Shetland, Scotland
- Breiwick Road, a street in Lerwick, Shetland, Scotland
