= List of islands by name (L) =

This article features a list of islands sorted by their name beginning with the letter L.

== L ==
Island's name	Island group(s)	Country/Countries
Lae Atoll	Ralik Chain	Marshall Islands
Læsø	Kattegat	Denmark
Lady's Holm	Shetland Islands	Scotland
Lahesaar	Gulf of Finland	Estonia
Laidu	Küdema Bay, Baltic Sea	Estonia
Laika	Shepherd Islands	Vanuatu
Lakshadweep	Lakshadweep Islands	India
Isle La Motte	Lake Champlain, Vermont	United States
Lamb Holm	The South Isles, Orkney Islands	Scotland
Lamba	Shetland Islands	Scotland
Lambasaar	Pärnu Bay, Gulf of Riga	Estonia
Lambay		Ireland
Lamma	Islands District, Hong Kong	China
Lampedusa	Pelagian Islands	Italy
Lampione	Pelagian Islands	Italy
Lamu	Lamu Islands	Kenya
Lānaʻi	Hawaiian Islands, Hawaii	United States
Lanaux	Bastian Bay, Louisiana	United States
Langeland		Denmark
Langenwerder		Germany
Langeoog	East Frisian Islands	Germany
Langkawi	Kedah	Malaysia
Langli	North Frisian Islands	Denmark
Langor	Arno Atoll	Marshall Islands
Langøya	Vesterålen	Norway
Lankiam Cay	Spratly Islands	Disputed between: China, Republic of China, Vietnam, Brunei, Philippines, and Malaysia
Lantau	Pearl River, Hong Kong	China
Lanz	Scott Islands, British Columbia	Canada
Lanzarote	Canary Islands	Spain
Larak	Persian Gulf	Iran
Lasqueti	Gulf Islands, British Columbia	Canada
Lastovo		Croatia
Lau	Admiralty Islands	Papua New Guinea
Laughery	Ohio River, Kentucky	United States
Lauley	Gloucester Pool Ontario	Canada
Laurie	South Orkney Islands	Claimed by: the United Kingdom as part of the Falkland Islands and by Argentina
Laurisaar	Baltic Sea	Estonia
Lausma	Baltic Sea	Estonia
Lavan	Persian Gulf	Iran
Lavezzi	Corsica	France
Lazaretto	Ionian Islands	Greece
Lebre	Alentejo islands	Portugal
Lefkada	Ionian Islands	Greece
Leftus	Lower Lough Erne	Ireland
Leipsoi	Dodecanese	Greece
Lélépa	Shepherd Islands	Vanuatu
Lemnos	North Aegean Islands	Greece
Lennox	Antártica Chilena Province	Chile
Leros	Dodecanese	Greece
Lesbos	North Aegean Islands	Greece
Lesser Mount Changtu	Zhoushan Archipelago	China
Lesser Mount Yang	Zhoushan Archipelago	China
Lesser Tunbs	Persian Gulf	Iran
Leung Shuen Wen	Hong Kong	China
Levanzo	Aegadian Islands	Italy
Levitha	Dodecanese Islands	Greece
Lewis	Thimble Islands, Connecticut	United States
Leyte	Visayas	Philippines
Lezíria Internacional	Alentejo islands	Portugal
Liancourt Rocks		Administered by South Korea. Claimed by: Japan
Lib	Ralik Chain	Marshall Islands
Lidingö	Stockholm archipelago	Sweden
Lido	Venetian Lagoon	Italy
Lieutenant	Wellfleet Harbor, Cape Cod, Massachusetts	United States
Lihou	Channel Islands	Guernsey
Liialaid	Väinameri Sea	Estonia
Liisi laid		Estonia
Liivakari	Gulf of Finland	Estonia
Likiep Atoll	Ratak Chain	Marshall Islands
Likoma	Lake Malawi	Malawi
Lindau	Lake Constance	Germany
Lindos	Dodecanese Islands	Greece
Linga Holm	The North Isles,Orkney Islands	Scotland
Linga near Muckle Roe	Shetland Islands	Scotland
Linga near Shetland Mainland	Shetland Islands	Scotland
Linga near Yell	Shetland Islands	Scotland
Linnusitamaa	Gulf of Riga	Estonia
Linosa	Pelagian Islands	Italy
Linua	Torres Islands	Vanuatu
Lipari	Aeolian Islands	Italy
Lismore	Inner Hebrides	Scotland
Lítla Dímun	Faroe Islands	Denmark
Little Andaman	Andaman Islands	India
Little Bear	Lake Winnipesaukee, New Hampshire	United States
Little Birch	Lake Winnipesaukee, New Hampshire	United States
Little Camp	Lake Winnipesaukee, New Hampshire	United States
Little Cayman	Cayman Islands	United Kingdom
Little Kitchener	Lake Huron, Ontario	Canada
Little Wellington Island	Aisén Region	Chile
Little Green	Hong Kong	China
Little Hurricane	Ohio River, Kentucky	United States
Little Mud	Louisiana	United States
Little Roe	Shetland Islands	Scotland
Little Sixmile	Lake Winnipesaukee, New Hampshire	United States
Little Skellig	Skellig Islands	Ireland
Little Wellington Island	Aisén Region	Chile
Liuheng	Zhoushan Archipelago	China
Lively	Falkland Islands	United Kingdom
Livingston	South Shetland Islands	Claimed by: Argentine Antarctica, Argentina, Antártica Chilena Province of Chile, and British Antarctic Territory of theUnited Kingdom
Livø		Denmark
Lizard Island	Lizard Island Group	Australia
Ljusterö	Stockholm archipelago	Sweden
Llanddwyn		Wales
Loaita	Spratly Islands	Disputed between: China, Republic of China, Vietnam, Brunei, Philippines, and Malaysia
Lockes	Lake Winnipesaukee, New Hampshire	United States
Loh	Torres Islands	Vanuatu
Lokrum		Croatia
Lolland		Denmark
Lombo	Ribatejo islands	Portugal
Lombok	Lesser Sunda Islands	Indonesia
Lonely	Georgian Bay Ontario	Canada
Long	Tennessee River, Alabama and Tennessee	United States
Long	Alabama	United States
Long	New York	United States
Long	Bahamas	Bahamas
Long	Nova Scotia	Canada
Long	Hudson Bay, Nunavut	Canada
Long	Leeward Islands	Antigua and Barbuda
Long	Whitsunday Islands, Queensland	Australia
Long	New South Wales	Australia
Long	Gull Lake Ontario	Canada
Long		Papua New Guinea
Long	Marlborough Sounds	New Zealand
Long	Fiordland	New Zealand
Long	Seychelles	Seychelles
Long		Turkey
Long	Poole Harbour	United Kingdom
Long	Langstone Harbour	United Kingdom
Long	Mississippi River, Illinois	United States
Long	Boston Harbor, Massachusetts	United States
Long	Apostle Islands, Wisconsin	United States
Lookout	Georgian Bay Ontario	Canada
Loon	Lake Shetek, Minnesota	United States
Loon	Lake Winnipesaukee, New Hampshire	United States
Loon	Georgian Bay Ontario	Canada
Looney	Tennessee River, Tennessee	United States
Loosahatchie Bar	Mississippi River, Tennessee	United States
Lopez	San Juan Islands, Washington	United States
Lopud	Elafit Islands	Croatia
Lord Howe	Lord Howe Islands, New South Wales	Australia
Los Negros	Admiralty Islands	Papua New Guinea
Lošinj		Croatia
Lõuna-Malusi	Malusi Islands, Gulf of Finland	Estonia
Low	South Shetland Islands	Claimed by: Argentine Antarctica, Argentina, Antártica Chilena Province of Chile, and British Antarctic Territory of theUnited Kingdom
Lower Grey Cloud	Minnesota	United States
Loyalty	a dependency of the French territory of New Caledonia	France
Lucas	Lake Huron, Ontario	Canada
Lucas	Western Australia	Australia
Luing	Inner Hebrides	Scotland
Lummi Island	San Juan Islands, Washington	United States
Lunga	Inner Hebrides	Scotland
Lunna Holm	Shetland Islands	Scotland
Lupa-sziget		Hungary
Lusty Beg	Lower Lough Erne	Ireland
Lusty more	Lower Lough Erne	Ireland
Lütjehörn	East Frisian Islands	Germany
Luzon	Luzon	Philippines
Lyal	Lake Huron, Ontario	Canada
Lyø		Denmark
Ly Son		Vietnam

== See also ==
- List of islands (by country)
- List of islands by area
- List of islands by population
- List of islands by highest point
