= North Mainland =

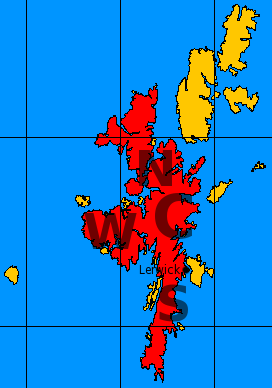
North, Central, West and South Mainland

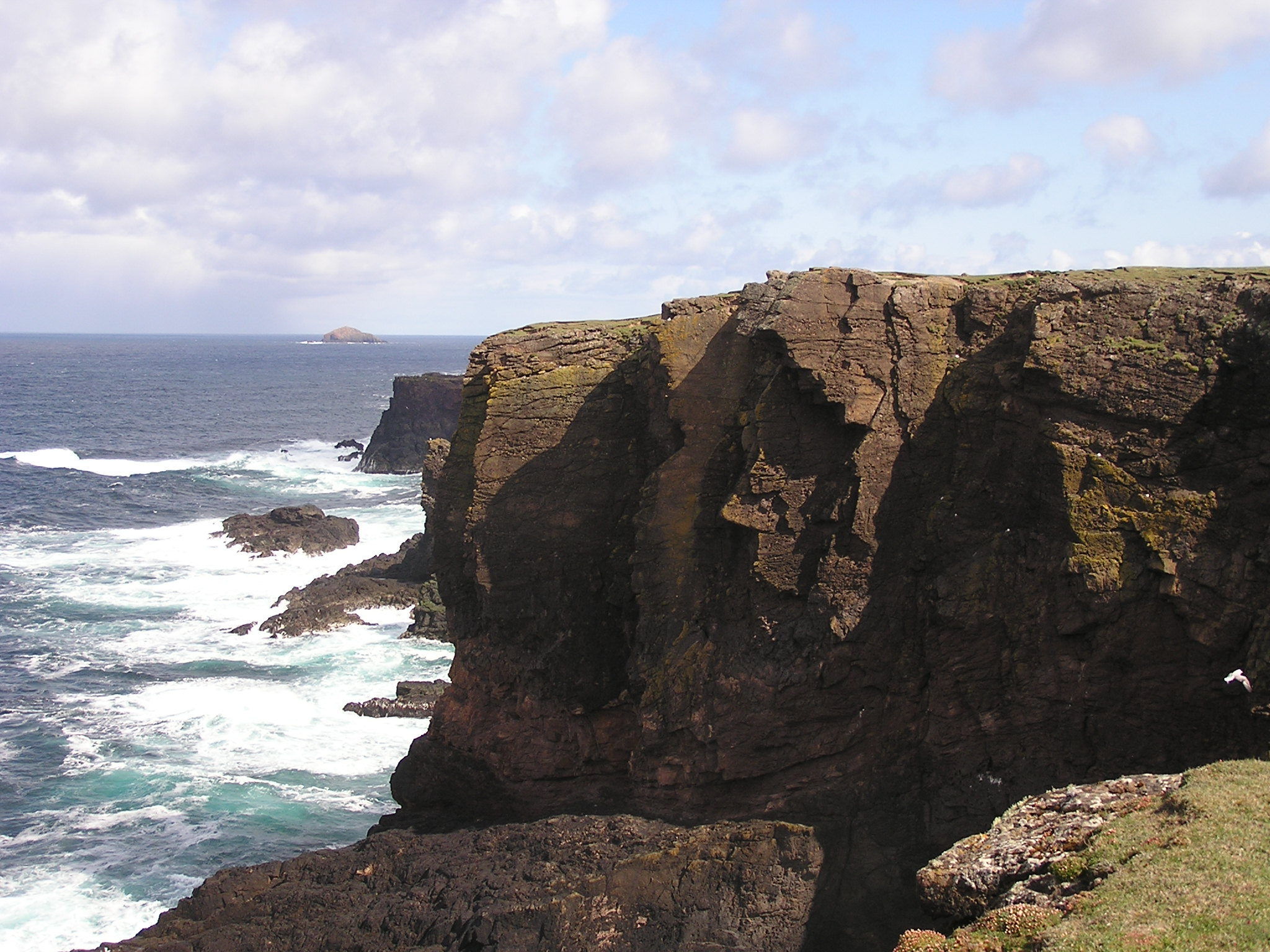
The cliffs of Eshaness, North Mainland

The North Mainland of the Shetland Islands, Scotland is the part of the Mainland lying north of Voe (60° 21′N).

== Geography ==
Notable places in North Mainland include:

- Sullom Voe, its oil terminal being an important source of employment for the islanders.
- Brae
- Muckle Roe
- Esha Ness Lighthouse
- Cunnigill Hill, 176 ft
- Toft ferry terminal, connecting the A968 to Yell
- Lunna Ness, with Lunna
- Lunnasting peninsula 60°21′54″N 1°8′9″W, with Lunning and Vidlin, with a ferry connecting to Whalsay
- the large Northmavine peninsula, connected to Mainland by a narrow isthmus at Mavis Grind
  - North Roe
  - Ronas Hill, 1475 ft/450 metres
  - Ollaberry
  - Hillswick
  - Uyea island

To the north east, are the North Isles, and Yell Sound
