= Delting =

Scottish parish

Coordinates: 60°23′59″N 1°17′24″W

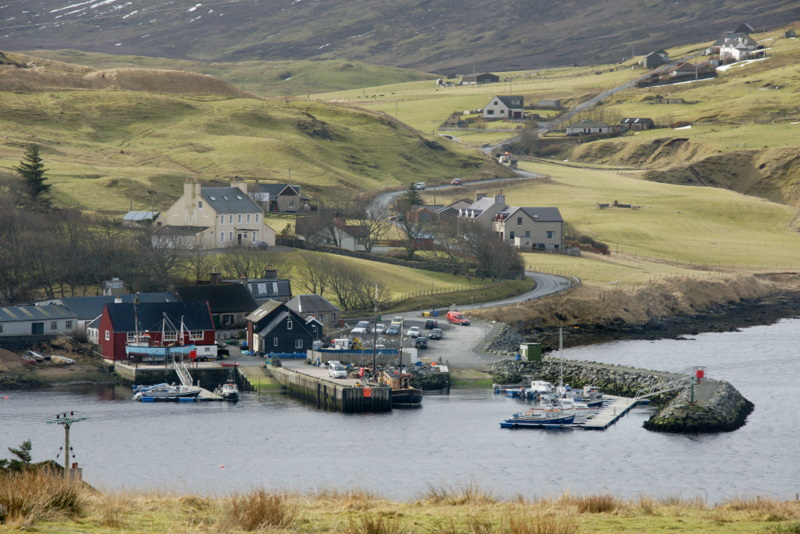
- Lower Voe

- Location within Shetland
- OS grid reference: HU391685
- Civil parish: Delting
- Council area: Shetland
- Lieutenancy area: Shetland
- Country: Scotland
- Sovereign state: United Kingdom
- Post town: SHETLAND
- Postcode district: ZE2
- Police: Scotland
- Fire: Scottish
- Ambulance: Scottish
- UK Parliament: Orkney and Shetland
- Scottish Parliament: Shetland

Delting is a civil parish and community council area on Mainland, Shetland, Scotland. It includes the Sullom Voe oil terminal and its main settlements are Brae, Mossbank and Voe.

The parish, as described in 1882–1884, included the islands of Bigga (co-owned with the civil parish of Yell), Fishholm, Brother Isle, Little Roe, and Muckle Roe; of these only Muckle Roe was at that time inhabited. The landward area "varies in breadth from 3 to 6 miles, being much intersected by voes or arms of the sea". Brae House, an early 1800s Shetland merchant's house and a B-rated building, is located in Delting.

Sullom Voe, the location of the Sullom Voe oil terminal and Shetland Gas Plant is an inlet of the North Sea between the parishes of Delting and Northmavine.
