= Little Roe =

Native name: Rauðey Litla
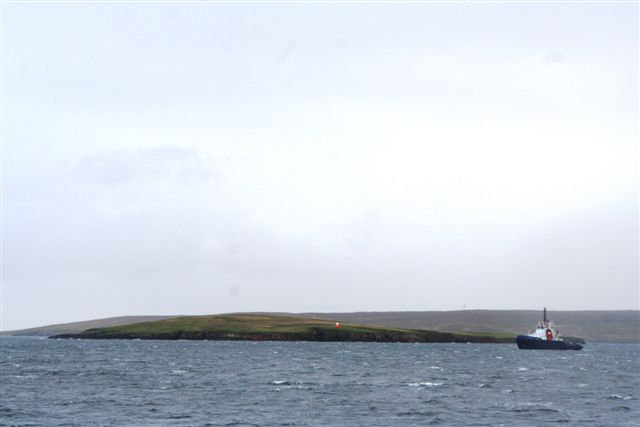

- Location within Shetland
- Etymology: Norse origin, meaning "small red island"

Geography
- Location: Yell Sound, Shetland Islands
- Coordinates: 60.4982°N 1.2682°W

Administration
- Scotland

Demographics
- Population: 0

Little Roe is an island in Yell Sound in the Shetland Islands

== History ==
The island's name is Norse in origin, from Rauðey Litla, meaning "small red island" in contradistinction to Muckle Roe, which is not nearby, but in St Magnus Bay.

In 1841, eleven people lived here, all in the same house.

A light beacon has been built on the island.

== Geography and geology ==
The island's name derives from its red granite. It is due east of the Northmavine at the entrance to Sullom Voe. Lamba is due north, and Uynarey, Brother Isle and Bigga between it and Yell

== Wildlife ==
Otters occasionally visit here, and puffins and storm petrels also nest here.

== See also ==
- List of islands of Scotland
