= Samphrey =

Uninhabited island in the Shetland Islands, Scotland

Samphrey (Scots)
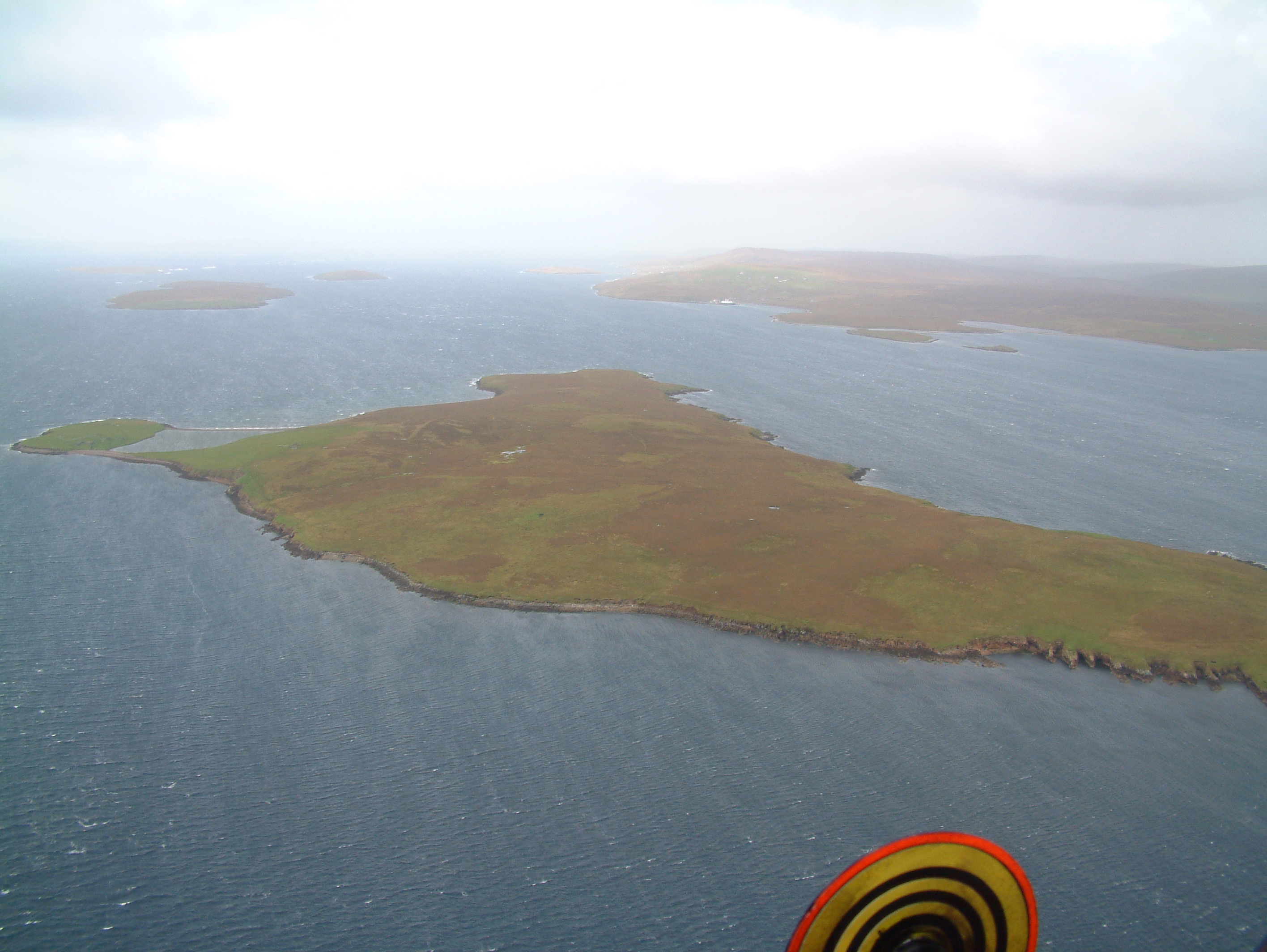
- Samphrey and the view down Yell Sound

Location
- Location within Shetland
- OS grid reference: HU467762
- Coordinates: 60.47°N 1.15°W

Name
- Name meaning: Old Norse for Sand
- Old Norse name: Sandfriðarey

Physical geography
- Island group: Shetland
- Area: 66 ha (0.25 sq mi)
- Area rank: 178=
- Highest elevation: 44 m (144 ft)

Administration
- Council area: Shetland Islands
- Country: Scotland
- Sovereign state: United Kingdom

Demographics
- Population: 0

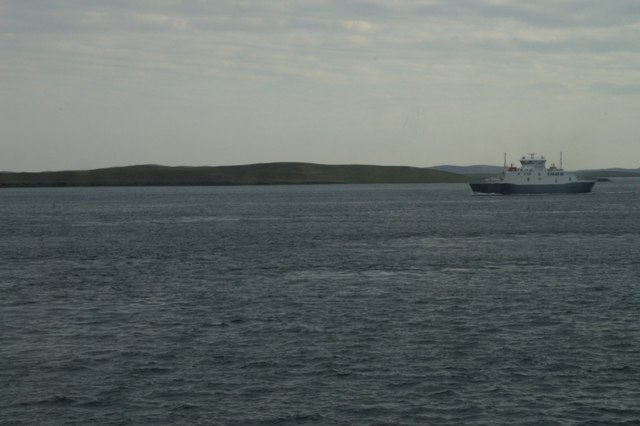
Samphrey with one of the Yell Sound ferries passing

Samphrey (Scots: Samphrey; Old Norse: Sandfriðarey) is an uninhabited island in the Shetland Islands, Scotland. One of Fair Isle's old names is "Friðarey" which is of similar origin.

It is situated in the southern end of Yell Sound, between the Mainland, Shetland at Mossbank and the island of Yell. On the O-S 1:50,000 map it covers an area of about 66 ha (including the once separate island of Bunglan). It is in the parish of Delting.

To the north west of Samphrey is Bunglan, which was once an island in its own right, but has become silted up by two tombolos, which now connect it to Samphrey. There is a small loch between Bunglan and Samphrey proper, which can just about be seen on the aerial picture.

Blaeu's Atlas Maior calls the island "Sancterre" (Holy Land) in the 17th century, lending the island another intriguing etymology.
