= Ollaberry =

Coordinates: 60.507°N 1.339°W

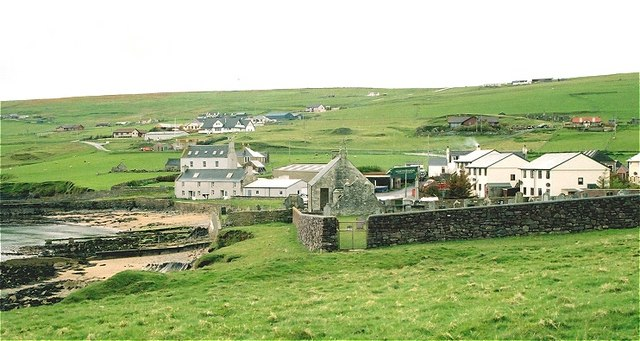
- The waterfront at Ollaberry

- Location within Shetland
- OS grid reference: HU362804
- Civil parish: Northmaven
- Council area: Shetland
- Lieutenancy area: Shetland
- Country: Scotland
- Sovereign state: United Kingdom
- Post town: Ollaberry
- Postcode district: ZE2
- Dialling code: 01806
- Police: Scotland
- Fire: Scottish
- Ambulance: Scottish
- UK Parliament: Orkney and Shetland
- Scottish Parliament: Shetland

Ollaberry (Old Norse: Olafrsberg, meaning Olaf's Hill) is a village on Mainland, Shetland, Scotland on the west shore of Yell Sound, 10.9 miles (17.5 km) north by road from Brae. Ollaberry Churchyard contains a Listed B monument, sculpted by John Forbes in 1754. Ollaberry Primary School was established in 1873.

== Geography ==
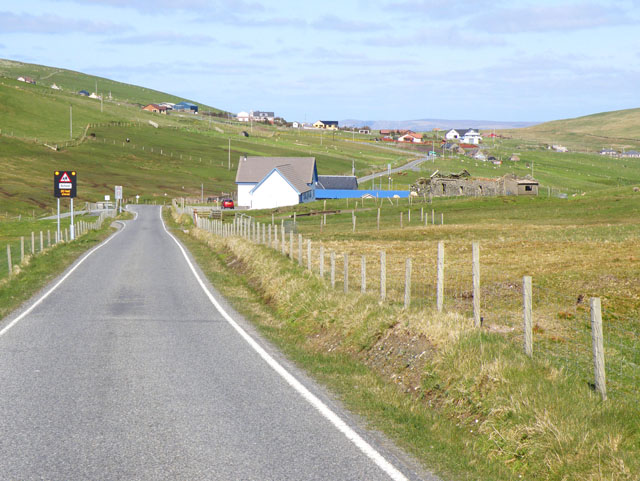
Road approaching Ollaberry

Ollaberry is situated within the parish of Northmaven in the Northmavine area of the Mainland of the Shetland Islands. Ollaberry was formerly a separate parish but united with Northmaven in the 16th century. By road, Ollaberry is 10.9 miles (17.5 km) north of Brae and 7.9 miles (12.7 km) east-northeast of Hillswick. It lies on Ollaberry Bay on the west shore of Yell Sound, with the island of Lamba about 1.4 kilometres (0.87 mi) to the east. There is a small beach and pier at Ollaberry, and a steep cliff falling to the sea to the northeast of the settlement.

== Landmarks ==
The village contains Ollaberry Kirk. In the churchyard is a large memorial with Corinthian-like columns, the work of sculptor John Forbes in 1754. Known as Ollaberry Kirkyard Monument, it was designated a Historic Scotland Category B listed monument on 18 October 1977.

== Education ==
Following the 1872 Act, a school board was formed in the Shetland Islands the following year, establishing schools in Ollaberry, North Roe, Collafirth, Eshaness, Urafirth, and Sullom. Ollaberry Primary School had been formed, and all of the schools were completed by 1880. Education Authority of Shetland gained authority of the schools in 1919. In 2014 it was proposed to close both North Roe and Urafirth schools and merge with Ollaberry. the merge proposal would save a projected £156,000 a year in costs.

== Notable people ==
Andrew Cheyne, the father of Sir William Cheyne, 1st Baronet the famous surgeon was from here. Sir William himself was born at sea off Tasmania.

Andrew Rodger Waterston FRSE (1912–1996) was born and raised in Ollaberry, the son of Rev James Waterston minister of the United Free Church of Scotland.
