= Delting Up Helly Aa =

Festival in the Shetland Islands

- Delting Up Helly Aa Logo
- Nickname: DUHA
- Genre: Up Helly Aa Festival
- Date: 3rd Friday in March
- Frequency: Annually
- Venue: Brae Hall; Brae Boating Club; Voe Hall; Mossbank Hall; Vidlin Hall
- Locations: Delting, Shetland
- Inaugurated: 1970
- Most recent: 2024-03-15
- Website: https://www.facebook.com/DUHA1981

Delting Up Helly Aa (known as Brae Up Helly Aa until 2001) is the final festival in the Shetland Islands' Up Helly Aa calendar, taking place on the third Friday of March in the parish of Delting.

== History ==
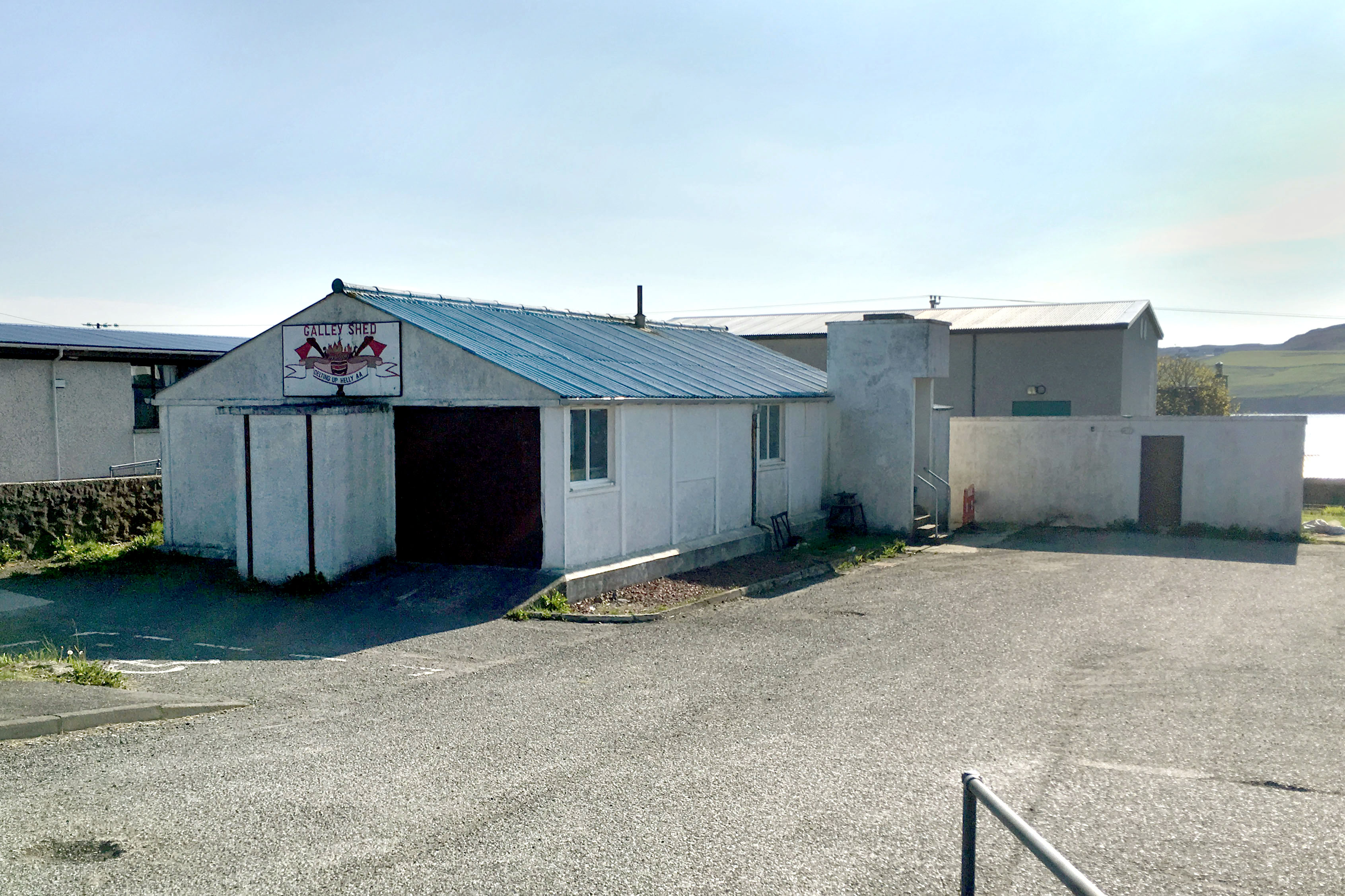
The former Delting Galley Shed, which was demolished in 2016

The festival was originally held by Brae Junior High School, the first being held in 1970. The school continued to hold the festival until 1979, and the remaining 'junior' festivals were held by parents and staff from the school. The Senior and Junior festivals had a two-year overlap, the first Senior festival in 1981, the last Junior festival in 1982.

Since the beginning of the senior festival, the Jarl's Squad lunch has taken place at various locations associated with Sullom Voe Terminal. It was held on board TEV Rangatira in 1981, at Firth Camp in 1982, at Sullom Voe & Brae Sailing Club in 1983, and Firth Camp again in 1984. In 1985 it was held in the Fraser Peterson Centre, the Sullom Voe Terminal canteen in 1986, the Fraser Peterson Centre again in 1987, and on board the accommodation rig Safe Lancia in 1988 and 1989. The lunch took place in the Fraser Peterson Centre every year between 1990 and 1997, and the Mid Brae Inn played host in 1998. It has been held in the Mossbank Community Hall with the Manager of Sullom Voe Terminal since 1999.

The original Galley Shed was demolished in 2016, with the new shed officially opened in June 2018. The Galley Shed was opened by Harold Johnson, who was the first 'senior' Delting Up Helly Aa Guizer Jarl in 1981.

Delting Up Helly Aa has been postponed several times in its history, once in 2007 following a death in the community, and a number of times due to the Coronavirus pandemic. Originally rescheduled to take place at the end of October 2020, it was pushed back to March 2021, then to March 2022, and again to March 2023. The first post-COVID event took place on 15 March 2024.

== The Day's Events ==
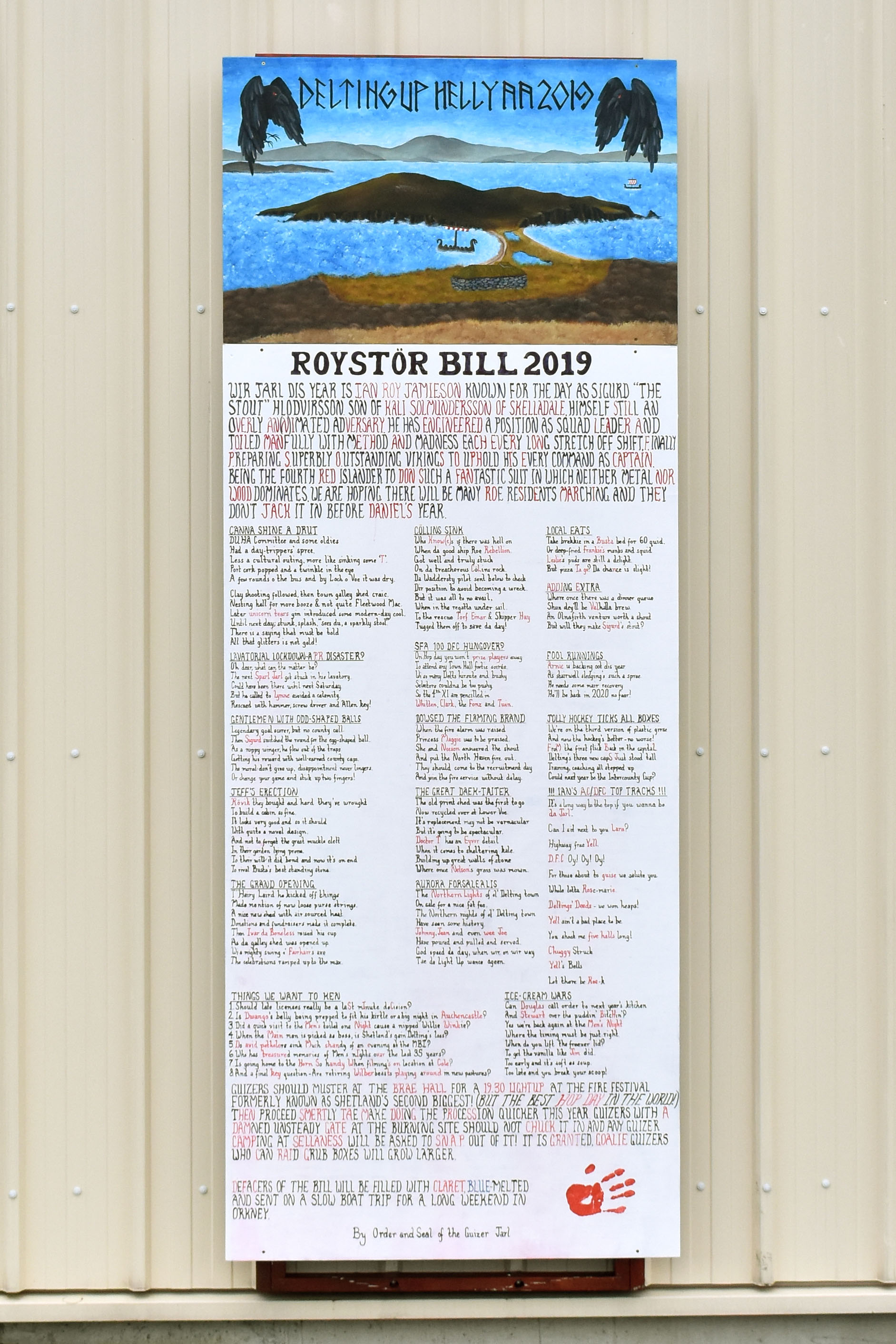
The Delting Up Helly Aa 2019 Bill

On the morning of Delting Up Helly Aa, the Jarl's squad gather at the Northern Lights Function Room in Brae. The squad proceeds to march to the Galley Shed, where the Bill can be seen, and where the galley stands on display. The Delting Up Helly Aa flag, which depicts Sleipnir, is raised at the Galley Shed. The squad then visits Lunnasting, Brae, and Mossbank Primary Schools (Olnafirth Primary was also visited until 2014), followed by lunch in the Mossbank Community Hall.

The squads muster at the Northern Lights Function Room, making their way up to the Brae Hall, where they receive torches ahead of the light up. The squads make their way through Brae, singing the Up Helly Aa song. The procession terminates at the Delting Boating Club, where the galley is set alight, and floated out into Busta Voe. The Norseman's Home is then sung, before the squads then make their way around the halls to perform their acts. The halls which open on the night are the Brae Hall, Delting Boating Club, Mossbank Hall, Voe Hall and Vidlin Hall. The Jarl's Squad visit the halls in the opposite direction to the rest of the squads.

The following day is known as "Hop Day", with various premises open with live music and entertainment. The Jarl's Squad pay visits to each event taking place.

== List of Guizer Jarls ==
=== Junior Jarls ===
Year	Guizer Jarl	Reference
1970	Peter Manson	
1971	Magnus Waddell	
1972	Robert Wood	
1973	Charlie Tait	
1974	John Robertson	
1975	David Manson	
1976	Clarence Mowat	
1977	James Manson	
1978	Peter Johnson	
1979	Kenneth Johnson	
1980	Karl Johnson	
1981	Ellis Johnson	
1982	Brian Anderson	

=== Senior Jarls ===
Year	Guizer Jarl	Portraying	Galley name	Reference
1981	Harold Johnson	Harald Fairhair		
1982	Fraser Peterson	King Olaf Kyre		
1983	Jeemie Manson	Sverre Sigurdson		
1984	Allan Laurenson	Inge Bardson	Sirda	
1985	Edmund Nicolson	Magnus Erlingsson		
1986	Ian Preston	Sigurd Munn		
1987	Tor Justad	Thorolf Moster Beard		
1988	Walter Leask	Hrafna Floki		
1989	Norman Howle	Gunnar of Hildarend		
1990	Forsyth Watt	Erik Blodaks		
1991	Ivor Williamson	Hägar the Horrible		
1992	Peter Manson	Killer-Styr of Hraum	Norla	
1993	Frank Ratter	Grettir the Outlaw		
1994	George Jamieson	Kari Solmundarson of Orkney		
1995	Eddie Thompson	Ivar the Boneless	Hallion	
1996	James Balfour	Thorbjorn Hrollagsson of Sogn	Donnerøni	
1997	Colin Johnson	Olav Hoskulsson		
1998	Allan Ridland	Kali Kolson	Hjálp	
1999	Billy Robertson	Eyjolf the Grey	Draupnir	
2000	David Johnson	Hakki Haroldson	Sleipner	
2001	Steven Laurenson	Duke Haakon	Kølins	
2002	Ewen Balfour	Baldr Byglan	Frygg	
2003	Martin Peterson	Thorvald Thoresson	Norlen	
2004	Willie Inkster	Ragnar Lodbrok Sigurdson	Hoenir	
2005	David Balfour	King Radbart Radbertsson	Kvak	
2006	David Manson	King Magnus Barelegs	Vinlander	
2007	Not held following the death of James Thomson			
2008	Wilbert Constable	Einar Vorse-Raven	Da Corbie	
2009	Stuart Robertson	Hakon Herdebreid	Sjødryen	
2010	Lawrence Johnson	Torf Einar	Elka	
2011	Kevin Laurenson	Haakon Haakonsson	Audannah	
2012	Bryden Nicolson	Anders Nicolassen	Anfield	
2013	Barry Anderson	Leif Erikson	Sinnika	
2014	Peter Peterson	Magnus Erlendsson	Betty Rylea	
2015	Alan Jamieson	Kveldulf Bjalfason	Solnytar	
2016	Christopher Nicolson	Sigurd Magnusson	Stor Sjø	
2017	John Duncan	Erik the Red	Larkspur	
2018	Andrew Hall	Halfdan Ragnarsson	Fragar	
2019	Ian Jamieson	Sigurd Hlodvirsson	Rauðøy Mær	
2020	Postponed due to the Coronavirus outbreak			
2021	Postponed due to the Coronavirus outbreak			
2022	Postponed due to the Coronavirus outbreak			
2023	Dwayne Davies	Steinthor Pétursson	Ragnarok	
2024	Daniel Johnson	Hakon Galinn	Rödahamar	
2025	James Manson	Thorstein Vigra-Styrsson	Maren	
2026	Paul Ratter			
2027	Eric Manson			
2028	Ellis Nicolson			
2029	Danny Peterson			
2030	Richard Grains			
2031	Liam Sutherland			
2032	Martyn Nicolson			
2033	Craig Thomson			
2034	Adam Lewis			
2035	Gary Hall			
2036	Robert Balfour			
2037	Murray Jamieson			
2038	Craig Laurenson			
