= Mary Hepburn =

Scottish obstetrician and gynaecologist

Mary Hepburn OBE FRCOG
- Born: 1949 (age 76–77); Hackney, London
- Education: University of Edinburgh
- Known for: establishing medical services for the care of socially disadvantaged pregnant women
- Medical career
- Field: obstetrics and gynaecology

Dr Mary Hepburn OBE FRCOG (born 1949) is a Scottish obstetrician and gynaecologist who is known for her work to support socially disadvantaged women. She has been involved with the Glasgow Women's Reproductive Health Services, leading this service for 25 years and producing guidelines that have had an international impact.

== Early life and education ==
Mary Hepburn was born in 1949 in Hackney, London. Her father was a general practitioner and her mother, a linguist. She was raised in Walls in the west of Shetland. She studied medicine at the University of Edinburgh, graduating in 1973. She completed her training as a general practitioner in Aberdeen, and then specialised in obstetrics.

== Career ==
During the 1980s, Mary was involved in the establishment of a community clinic at Stobhill in Glasgow to combat the impacts of rising drug use in the area, including the spread of HIV. This service quickly grew, going from 12 patients in its first year to over 130 patients in its third year.

In 1990, she established the Glasgow Women's Reproductive Health Services at Glasgow Royal Maternity Hospital to provide specialist support for pregnant women with drug and alcohol addictions, HIV, mental illness or experiencing homelessness, domestic abuse or rape. This multi-disciplinary service grew more than tenfold in three years, going from 12 patients in its first year to more than 130 in the third year. The clinic is part of NHS Greater Glasgow and Clyde and is now known as the Special Needs in Pregnancy Service (SNIPS). As of 2016, around 300 women a year attend the clinic. Hepburn led the service for more than 25 years, and the guidelines used by the clinic are an internationally recognised method for treating socially-disadvantaged pregnant women, and have been adopted worldwide.

Hepburn was a senior lecturer in women's reproductive health at the Glasgow Royal Infirmary. She has also worked with the United Nations Children’s Fund, the World Health Organisation and Amnesty International, putting in place similar services and support for women around the world.

Mary was chosen as one of the Edinburgh Medical School's 300 Faces. Her career was highlighted to celebrate the Edinburgh Medical School's 300th anniversary, with Mary's story featuring on public exhibitions and digital publications.

== Awards and honours ==
- 2007, lifetime achievement award from the domestic violence organisation Zero Tolerance.
- 2012, named Scotswoman of the Year by the Evening Times newspaper.
- 2015, OBE in the 2015 Birthday Honours
