= MV Daggri =

2004 car ferry operating in the Shetlands

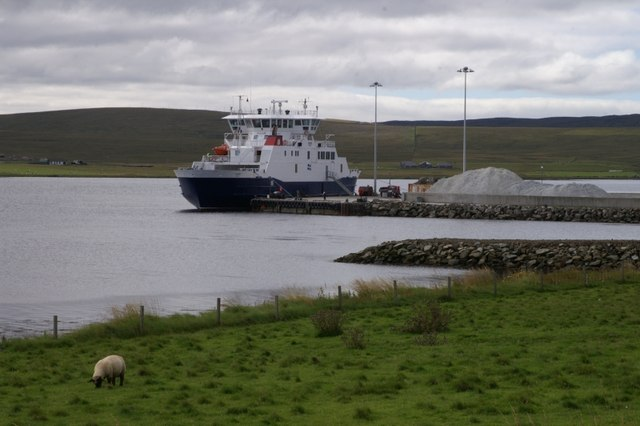
- MV Daggri berthed at Baltasound pier, Unst when on a special cruise.

History

United Kingdom
- Name: MV Daggri
- Namesake: Old Norse for Dawn
- Owner: Shetland Islands Council
- Operator: SIC Ferries
- Port of registry: Lerwick
- Route: Yell Sound (2004 - )
- Builder: Northern Shipbuilders, Gdańsk, Poland
- Yard number: B600/1
- Launched: 17 December 2003
- Completed: 2004
- In service: 17 July 2004
- Refit: Once a Year, normally March
- Identification: IMO number: 9291614; MMSI number: 235014768; Callsign: MDHA6
- Status: In Service

General characteristics
- Type: Ro-Ro Vehicle & Passenger Ferry
- Tonnage: Gross Tonnage: 1861; Net Tonnage: 558; Deadweight Tonnage: 325
- Length: Length Overall: 65.36 m (214.4 ft); Length of Car Deck: 52.6 m (172.6 ft)
- Beam: 14.3 m (46.9 ft)
- Draught: 3.7 m (12.1 ft)
- Depth: 5.6 m (18.4 ft)
- Ramps: Bow and Stern Ramps and Visors
- Installed power: 2 x MAK 6M20 diesel engines each at 1,200kW@1000rpm
- Propulsion: 2x Rolls-Royce Aquamaster Azimuth Thrusters
- Speed: 12 knots (22 km/h; 14 mph)
- Boats & landing craft carried: 1x Fast Rescue Boat; Marine Evacuation System
- Capacity: 95 Passengers (with 5 crew); 144 Passengers (with 6 crew); 31 Cars (with 0 Artics, 7 cars with 4 Artics); 4 Artics
- Crew: 5/6

MV Daggri is a double ended ro-ro passenger and car ferry that operates on the Yell Sound service by SIC Ferries. She is the sister ship of MV Dagalien.

== History ==
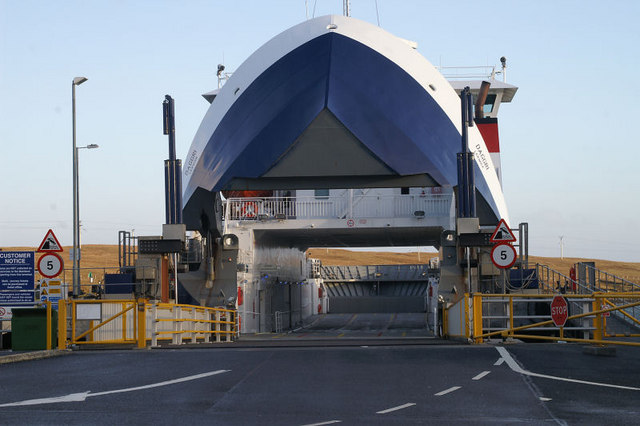
MV Daggri berthed in Ulsta, Yell

Due to ever increasing traffic on the Yell Sound service, the council ordered MV Daggri and MV Dagalien in 2000. They were designed by a Norwegian company to replace MV Bigga and MV Hendra, doubling the capacity on the route.

On 17 December 2003, the ferry, which was known only as B600/1, was named Daggri and launched. After four days of sea trials she began on her voyage to Shetland, being delivered to Shetland Islands Council on 11 June 2004.

== Layout ==
The vessel has a big car deck with 3 lanes, which has a disabled toilet situated on it. There are two entrances to the passenger lounge on the car deck, which takes you up 2 flights of stairs above the car deck.

The passenger lounge has seats, tables, toilets, non-operational vending machines and a children's play area. There is an outside deck area, where you can sit outside.

== Service ==
Entering service on 17 July 2004 on the Yell Sound service, operating alongside MV Hendra at first until her sister ship was completed and started service in August.

On 30 July 2004, MV Daggri made contact with the breakwater in Ulsta, Yell in fog. Her forward Azimuth Thruster was damaged, the vessel was able to get alongside and discharged using only the aft thruster.

Along with her sister ship, MV Dagalien, continue to operate the Yell Sound service. The service links Toft on the Mainland of Shetland to the small settlement of Ulsta on Yell.
