= Firth, Shetland =

Coordinates: 60.444°N 1.197°W

Firth
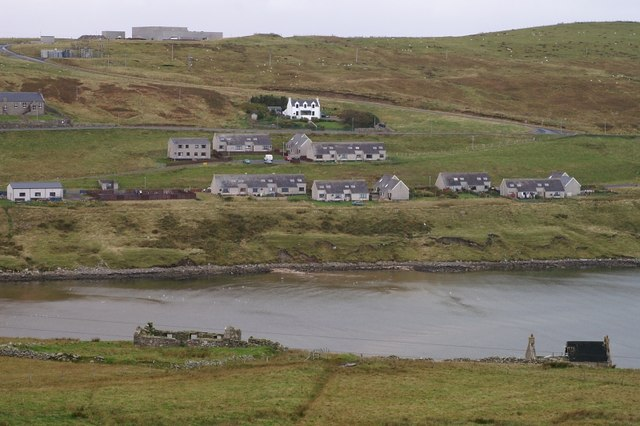
- The pre-oil housing can be seen in the background, and the modern oil worker's housing in the foreground with the now derelict Fraser Peterson Centre on top of the hill in Firth

- Location within Shetland
- OS grid reference: HU441735
- Civil parish: Delting
- Council area: Shetland
- Lieutenancy area: Shetland
- Country: Scotland
- Sovereign state: United Kingdom
- Post town: SHETLAND
- Postcode district: ZE2
- Dialling code: 01806
- Police: Scotland
- Fire: Scottish
- Ambulance: Scottish
- UK Parliament: Orkney and Shetland
- Scottish Parliament: Shetland

- Note: "Firth" is a common name for sounds in Shetland

Firth (Shaetlan pronunciation: [fɪrt] FIRT) is a village in the north east of Mainland, Shetland, Scotland, in the parish of Delting, not far from Mossbank. It is 27 miles from Lerwick.

== History ==
Along with a stone memorial at the entrance to the village, many abandoned croft houses still stand on the hill across Firth Voe from Mossbank. These commemorate the infamous Delting Disaster of 21 December 1900 when twenty-two local fishermen were lost during a storm, decimating the community.

Because of the oil industry, which grew in 1970s Shetland, a number of temporary dwellings were built, followed by some housing estates, some now demolished.
