= MV Dagalien =

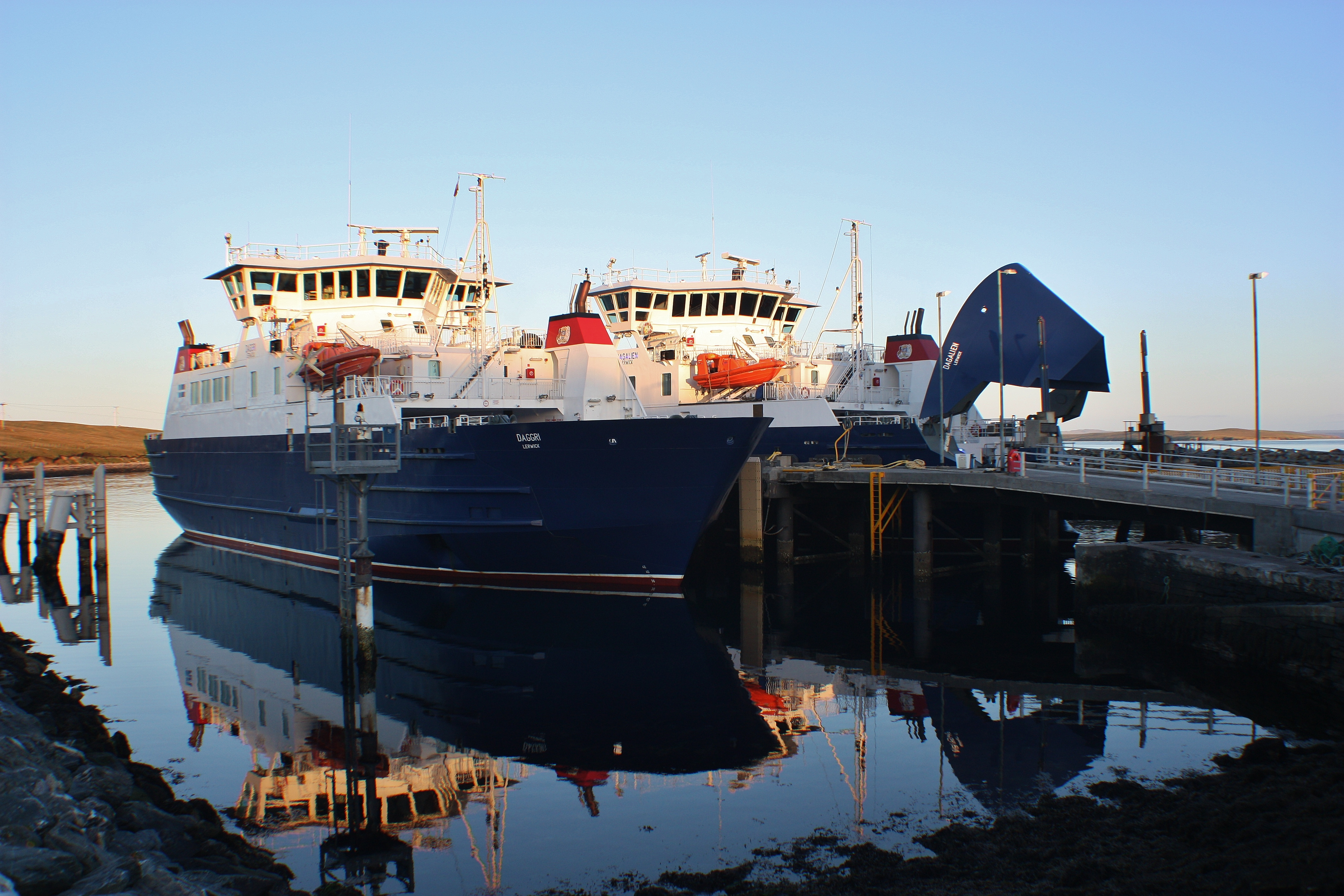
- MV Dagalien berthed at Ulsta, Yell with her visor open.

History

United Kingdom
- Name: MV Dagalien
- Namesake: Old Norse for Dusk
- Owner: Shetland Islands Council
- Operator: SIC Ferries
- Port of registry: Lerwick
- Route: Yell Sound (2004 - )
- Builder: Northern Shipbuilders, Gdańsk, Poland
- Yard number: B600/2
- Launched: 19 February 2004
- Completed: 2004
- In service: August 2004
- Refit: Once a Year, normally April - May
- Identification: IMO number: 9291626; MMSI number: 235014766; Callsign: MDHK7
- Status: In Service

General characteristics
- Type: Ro-Ro Vehicle & Passenger Ferry
- Tonnage: Gross Tonnage: 1861; Net Tonnage: 558; Deadweight Tonnage: 325
- Length: Length Overall: 65.36 m (214.4 ft); Length of Car Deck: 52.6 m (172.6 ft)
- Beam: 14.3 m (46.9 ft)
- Draught: 3.7 m (12.1 ft)
- Depth: 5.6 m (18.4 ft)
- Ramps: Bow and Stern Ramps and Visors
- Installed power: 2 x MAK 6M20 diesel engines each at 1,200kW@1000rpm
- Propulsion: 2x Rolls-Royce Aquamaster Azimuth Thrusters
- Speed: 12 knots (22 km/h; 14 mph)
- Boats & landing craft carried: 1x Fast Rescue Boat; Marine Evacuation System
- Capacity: 95 Passengers (with 5 crew); 144 Passengers (with 6 crew); 31 Cars (with 0 Artics, 7 cars with 4 Artics); 4 Artics
- Crew: 5/6

MV Dagalien is a double ended roll-on/roll-off passenger and car ferry that operates on the Yell Sound service, operated by SIC Ferries. She is the sister ship of MV Daggri.

== History ==
Due to ever increasing traffic on the Yell Sound service, the council ordered MV Daggri and MV Dagalien in 2000. They were designed by a Norwegian company to replace MV Bigga and MV Hendra, doubling the capacity on the route.

On 19 February 2004, the ferry, which was known only as B600/2, was named Dagalien and launched. After several days of sea trials she began on her voyage to Shetland, being delivered to Shetland Islands Council in July 2004.

== Layout ==
The vessel has a big car deck with 3 lanes, which has a disabled toilet situated on it. There are two entrances to the passenger lounge on the car deck, which takes you up 2 flights of stairs above the car deck.

The passenger lounge has seats, tables, toilets, non-operational vending machines and a children's play area. There is an outside deck area, where you can sit outside.

== Service ==
Entering service in August 2004 on the Yell Sound service, operating alongside her sister ship, MV Daggri. They continue to operate the Yell Sound service today, linking Toft on the Mainland of Shetland to the small settlement of Ulsta on Yell.
