= Mossbank, Shetland =

Coordinates: 60.457°N 1.184°W

Mossbank
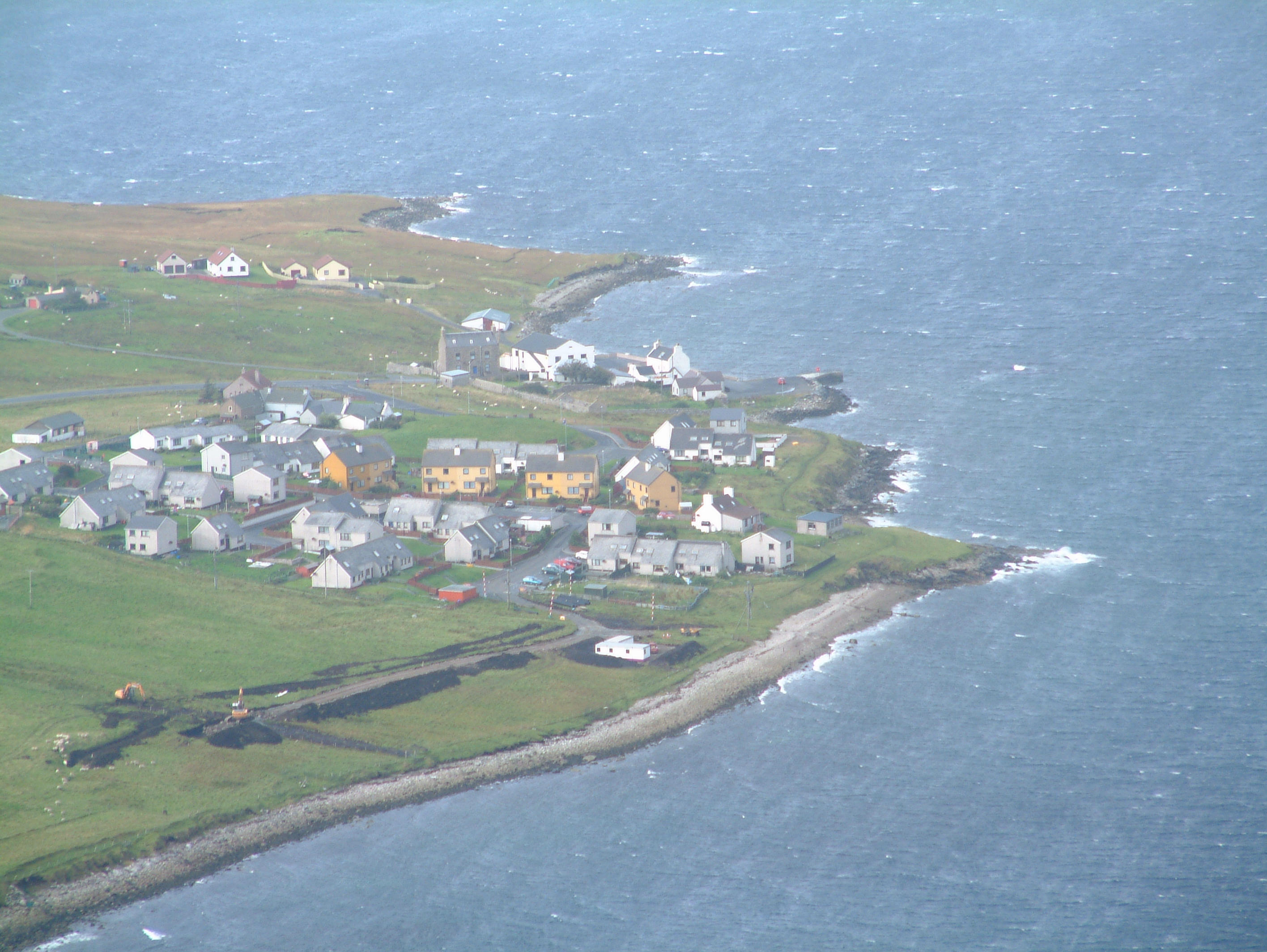
- The Village of Mossbank as seen from the air

- Location within Shetland
- OS grid reference: HU448750
- Civil parish: Delting
- Council area: Shetland
- Lieutenancy area: Shetland
- Country: Scotland
- Sovereign state: United Kingdom
- Post town: SHETLAND
- Postcode district: ZE2
- Dialling code: 01806
- Police: Scotland
- Fire: Scottish
- Ambulance: Scottish
- UK Parliament: Orkney and Shetland
- Scottish Parliament: Shetland

Mossbank is a village in the north east of the Mainland of Shetland, Scotland. Originally served by an inter island ferry steamer from Lerwick, this ceased when the Yell Sound ferry commenced from the small port of Toft, approximately 1 mile further north. The village was profoundly changed in the early 1980s when construction began on the nearby Sullom Voe oil terminal. Large amounts of temporary accommodation were erected to house the construction workforce, with the population expanding from 130 in the early 1970s to about a thousand a decade later. The number of residents in Mossbank fluctuates, making it hard to record a village population.

The village has one primary school, Mossbank Primary School, a public house, The Welcome Inn, a Post Office and a local hall.

Mossbank and its adjoining area of Firth are in the parish of Delting. A stone memorial at the entrance to the village commemorates the infamous "Delting Disaster" of 21 December 1900 when twenty-two local fishermen in four boats were lost during a storm. An inscription on the memorial reads "You see dey wirna mine, Da Loard gae dem tae me fir a time and dan he took dem back ageen".
