= Uyea =

Uyea (pronounced "oe-yë") may refer to:

- Uyea, Unst, an uninhabited island south of Unst in Shetland, Scotland
- Uyea, Northmavine, an uninhabited island northwest of Mainland, Shetland

== See also ==
- Uyeasound, a village on Unst overlooking the first Uyea
- Uynarey, one of the Shetland islands
