= Fish Holm =

Small island east of Mainland, Shetland

Coordinates: 60°27′N 1°08′W

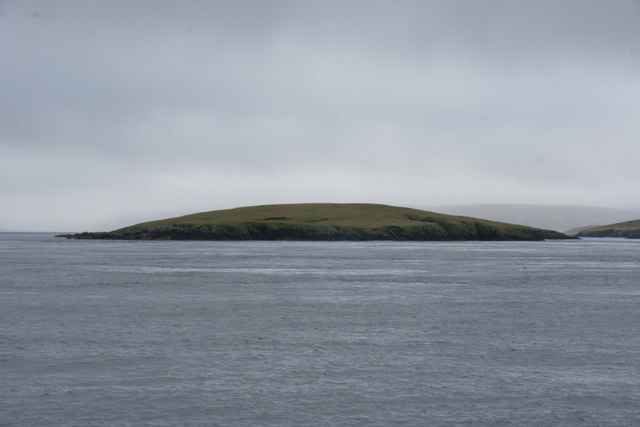

Fish Holm (Shaetlan pronunciation: [ˈfɪʃəm] FISH-əm) is a small island, 1.5 miles (2.4 km) east of Mainland, Shetland. It is near the village of Mossbank.

It is 20 metres (66 ft) at its highest point, and a mile south of Samphrey in Yell Sound.
