= List of the largest islands in the North Sea =

This is a list of the 50 largest islands in the North Sea.

Islands of the North Sea
#	Island	Country	Location/Land	Area (km^{2})
1.	Mainland	United Kingdom	Shetland	969
2.	Mainland	United Kingdom	Orkney	523
3.	Stord	Norway	Vestland	241
4.	Yell	United Kingdom	Shetland	212
5.	Tysnesøy	Norway	Vestland	198
6.	Karmøy	Norway	Vestland	177
7.	Sotra	Norway	Vestland	176
8.	Bømlo	Norway	Vestland	171
9.	Texel	Netherlands	North Holland	162
10.	Rømø	Denmark	Skærbæk municipality	128
11.	Unst	United Kingdom	Shetland	121
12.	Radøy	Norway	Vestland	103
13.	Askøy	Norway	Vestland	99
14.	Sylt	Germany	Schleswig-Holstein	99
15.	Isle of Sheppey	United Kingdom	Thames Estuary	94
16.	Terschelling	Netherlands	Friesland	88
17.	Holsnøy	Norway	Vestland	88
18.	Föhr	Germany	Schleswig-Holstein	82
19.	Fanø	Denmark	North Frisian Islands	80
20.	Ameland	Netherlands	Friesland	60
21.	Ombo	Norway	Rogaland	58
22.	Huftarøy	Norway	Vestland	50
23.	Gossa	Norway	Møre og Romsdal	46.5
24.	Nøtterøy	Norway	Vestfold	46.5
25.	Rennesøy	Norway	Rogaland	46.5
26.	Schiermonnikoog	Netherlands	Friesland	41
27.	Vlieland	Netherlands	Friesland	40
28.	Atløy	Norway	Vestland	38
29.	Pellworm	Germany	Schleswig-Holstein	37
30.	Reksteren	Norway	Vestland	37
31.	Vestre Bokn	Norway	Rogaland	36
32.	Lindisfarne	United Kingdom	Northumberland	35.41
33.	Ytre Sula	Norway	Vestland	34
34.	Sandøyna	Norway	Vestland	32
35.	Borkum	Germany	Niedersachsen	31
36.	Kirkeøy	Norway	Østfold	29.6
37.	Tromøya	Norway	Agder	28.6
38.	Fosnøyna	Norway	Vestland	26.3
39.	Norderney	Germany	Niedersachsen	26
40.	Finnøy	Norway	Rogaland	25
41.	Tjøme	Norway	Vestfold	24.5
42.	Selbjørn	Norway	Vestland	23.8
43.	Foulness	United Kingdom	Thames Estuary	23.8
44.	Kråkerøy	Norway	Østfold	23.6
45.	Amrum	Germany	Schleswig-Holstein	20.46
46.	Hidra	Norway	Agder	20
47.	Eigerøy	Norway	Rogaland	19.9
48.	Langeoog	Germany	East Frisian Islands	19.7
49.	Whalsay	United Kingdom	Shetland Islands	19.7
50.	Jeløy	Norway	Østfold	19

== See also ==
- List of islands of the British Isles
- List of islands of Denmark
- List of islands of Germany
- List of islands of the Netherlands
- List of islands of Norway
