= Busta Voe =

Sea inlet in the north central Mainland, Shetland, Scotland

Coordinates: 60°23′6″N 1°21′34″W

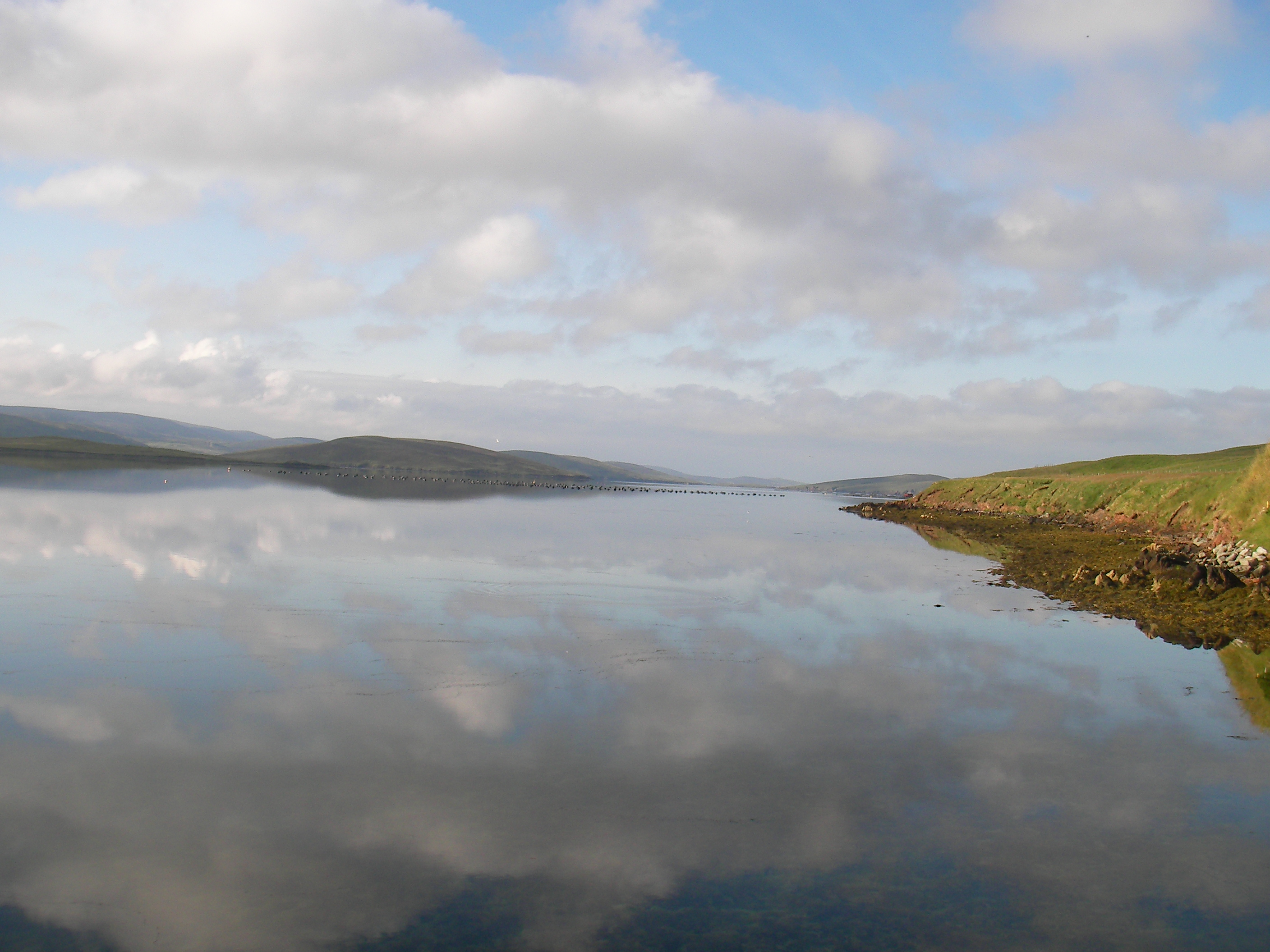

Busta Voe (Shaetlan pronunciation: [ˈbøsti vo]), (HU665350), in the north central Mainland, Shetland, Scotland, is a sea inlet lying between the village of Brae and the island of Muckle Roe. At the head of the voe is the Delting Marina and Boating Club.

During the First World War Busta Voe was a Naval Anchorage of the 10th Cruiser Squadron which was tasked with the Northern Patrol helping to blockade German supplies and prevent German warships from entering the Atlantic from the North Sea. Initially obsolescent cruisers were used but these were later replaced by Armed Merchantmen which had better seakeeping qualities. HMS Gibraltar was the depot ship for the squadron.

During the 2005 Island Games, Busta Voe was the venue for the sailing events.

== Sources ==
- This article is based on http://shetlopedia.com/Busta_Voe a GFDL wiki.
