= Orfasay =

Coordinates: 60°28′45″N 1°06′15″W

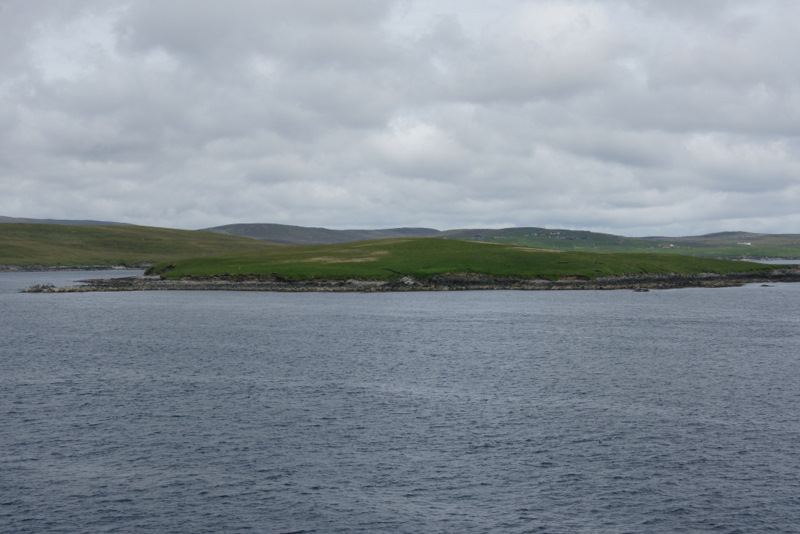
Orfasay viewed from the south

Orfasay (Old Norse: Orfyrisey, meaning "tidal island") is one of the Shetland Islands.

== Geography ==
Orfasay is a tidal island in Yell Sound, connected to Yell at low tide. This is reflected in the island's name.

It is near the mouth of Hamna Voe and Cuppister in Yell.

The island is uninhabited but two structures on the North-West side of the island can be seen. The structures have no roofs, implying that they are ruined buildings and indicating that the island was inhabited in the past.

== See also ==
- List of islands of Scotland
