= South Mainland =

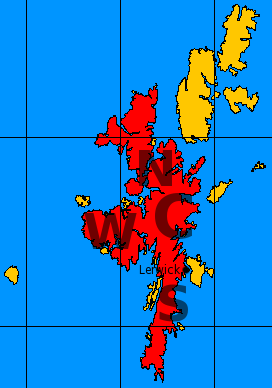
South, Central, North and West Mainland

The South Mainland of the Shetland Islands is the southern peninsula of Mainland island. It lies south of Hellister (60° 14′N). The greater southern part of the peninsula belongs to the civil parish of Dunrossness. The rest belongs to the parishes of Lerwick and Tingwall (small part of the latter). St Ninian's Isle is a tidal island off its west coast.

== Geography ==
Points of interest include:

- Lerwick
- Scalloway
- Veensgarth
- Gulberwick
- Quarff
- Cunningsburgh
- Sandwick
- Hoswick
- Bigton
- Scousburgh
- Fitful Head
- Sumburgh Head
