= Lamba, Shetland =

Uninhabited island in Yell Sound in Shetland

Lamba
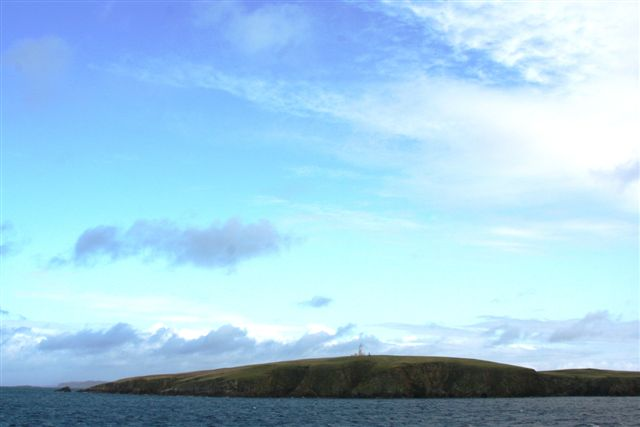
- Beacon at south-west of Lamba

Location
- Lamba shown within Shetland
- OS grid reference: HU390816
- Coordinates: 60.52°N 1.29°W

Name
- Old Norse name: Lambey

Physical geography
- Island group: Shetland
- Area: 43 ha (0.17 sq mi)
- Area rank: 215
- Highest elevation: 35 m (115 ft)

Administration
- Council area: Shetland Islands
- Country: Scotland
- Sovereign state: United Kingdom

Demographics
- Population: 0

Lamba is an uninhabited island in Yell Sound in Shetland. It lies 1.5 km (0.93 mi) north of the entrance to the Sullom Voe inlet and 1.4 kilometres (0.87 mi) east of the Mainland coastline near Ollaberry. Rising 35 metres above sea level, it has an area of 43 hectares (0.17 sq mi). Its main features are a 27m high light marking the entrance to Sullom Voe, and an adjacent communications mast.

There are similarly named places, Lamba in the Faroe Islands and Lambay in Ireland.
