= Lunna Holm =

Lunna Holm Lighthouse
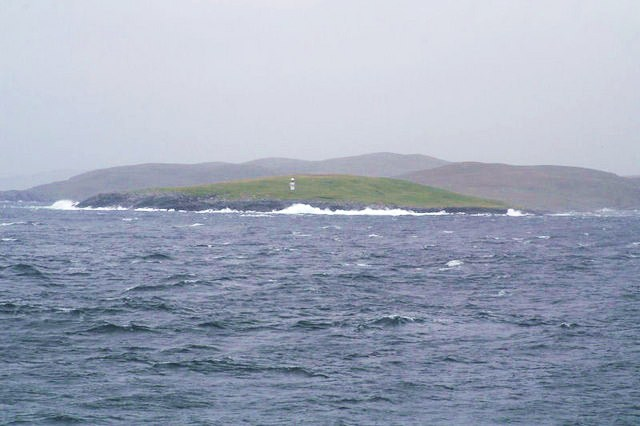
- The light on the holm off the end of Lunna Ness
- Location: Lunna Holm; Shetland; Scotland; United Kingdom
- Coordinates: 60.455223°N 1.040976°W

Tower
- Constructed: 1985
- Construction: fiberglass tower
- Height: 8 metres (26 ft)
- Shape: cylindrical tower with balcony and lantern
- Markings: white tower and lantern
- Power source: solar power
- Operator: Northern Lighthouse Board

Light
- Focal height: 19 metres (62 ft)
- Range: 10 nautical miles (19 km; 12 mi) red and green: 7 nautical miles (13 km; 8.1 mi)
- Characteristic: Fl (3) WRG 15s.

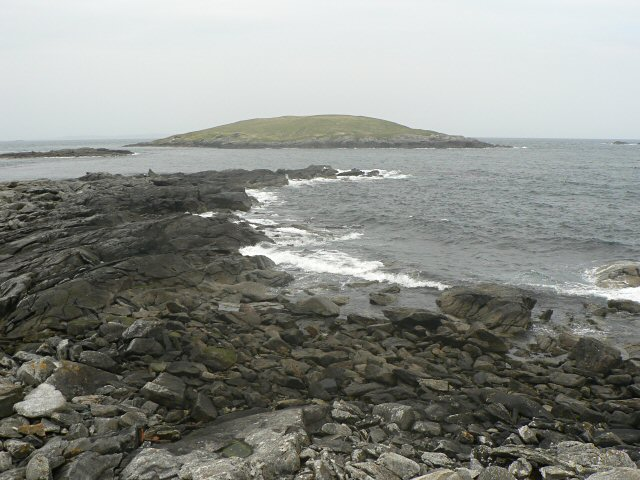
Lunna Holm from Land Taing

Lunna Holm is a small island near Lunna Ness (Mainland, Shetland), in the Shetland Islands. It is 27 metres (89 ft) at its highest point.

== Lighthouse ==
Lunna Holm Lighthouse is an active lighthouse located on Lunna Holm at the east entrance of Yell Sound. It was built in 1985 in fiberglass, it is fully automated and run by solar power; it emits three white, red or green flashes every 15 seconds depending from the direction.

== See also ==
- List of lighthouses in Scotland
- List of Northern Lighthouse Board lighthouses
