= Breiwick =

Coordinates: 60.207°N 1.182°W

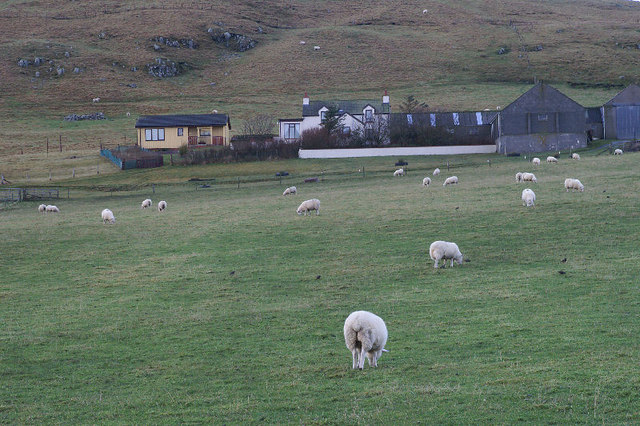
- Houses at Breiwick

- Location within Shetland
- OS grid reference: HU453471
- Civil parish: Tingwall
- Council area: Shetland
- Lieutenancy area: Shetland
- Country: Scotland
- Sovereign state: United Kingdom
- Post town: SHETLAND
- Postcode district: ZE2
- Dialling code: 01595
- Police: Scotland
- Fire: Scottish
- Ambulance: Scottish
- UK Parliament: Orkney and Shetland
- Scottish Parliament: Shetland

Breiwick is a village on the island of Mainland in Shetland, Scotland. Breiwick is in the parish of Tingwall, and is 1.6 mi (2.5 km) north-east of Gott. The remains of a broch are located above Corbie Geo at Hawks Ness, near to the settlement. Wildlife in the area includes the knot.
