= Uynarey =

Coordinates: 60°30′35″N 01°11′45″W

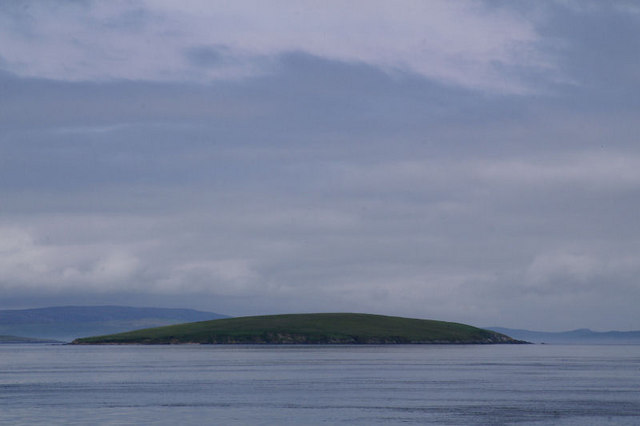
- Uynarey From the Yell Sound ferry

Location
- Uynarey shown within Shetland

Name
- Name meaning: Venerated island

Physical geography
- Island group: Shetland
- Highest elevation: 36 metres (118 ft)

Administration
- Council area: Shetland
- Country: Scotland
- Sovereign state: United Kingdom

Demographics
- Population: 0

Uynarey is one of the Shetland islands in Yell Sound, just to the north of Bigga, and east of Brother Island. It is an RSPB reserve. The name comes from the Norse for "venerated island", and this may reflect a Culdee connection.

== Geology and geography ==
There is a small bay in the east - Haa Geo, and a cave in the west. The North end is called "the Niv". It is approximately 0.5 miles (0.8 km) long. The geology is moine gneiss and quartzite. It has steep sides, and is over 30 metres (98 ft) tall.

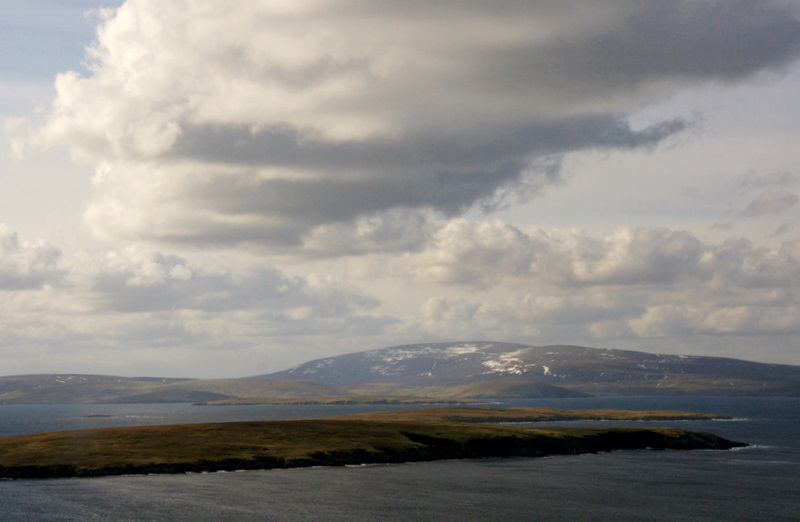
View over Uynarey looking across the islands of Uynarey and Brother Isle in Yell Sound towards Ronas Hill.

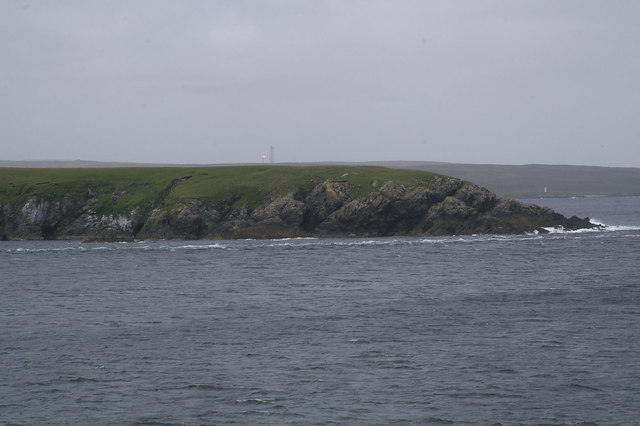
North end of Uynarey

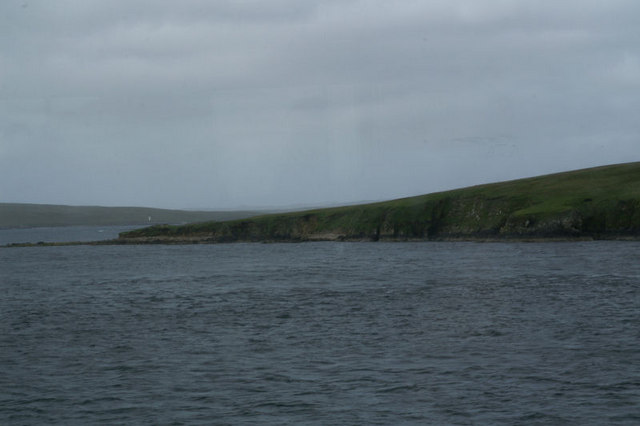
:South end of Uynarey

grid reference HU439808

== See also ==
- List of islands of Scotland
