= Central Mainland =

Coordinates: 60°18′N 1°15′W

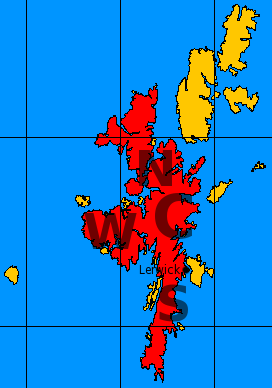
Central, West, North and South Mainland

The Central Mainland of the Shetland Islands is the part of the Mainland, the largest of the Shetland Islands, Scotland. It is located between Hellister, Aith and Voe.

== Important Bird Area ==
A 2,719 ha area of Central Shetland has been designated an Important Bird Area (IBA) by BirdLife International. The site includes stretches of blanket bog with small lochs, as well as mires, heaths, marshes and acid grassland, that support a suite of moorland birds.
