= Langenwerder =

Island in Mecklenburg-Vorpommern, Germany

Coordinates: 54°02′N 11°30′E

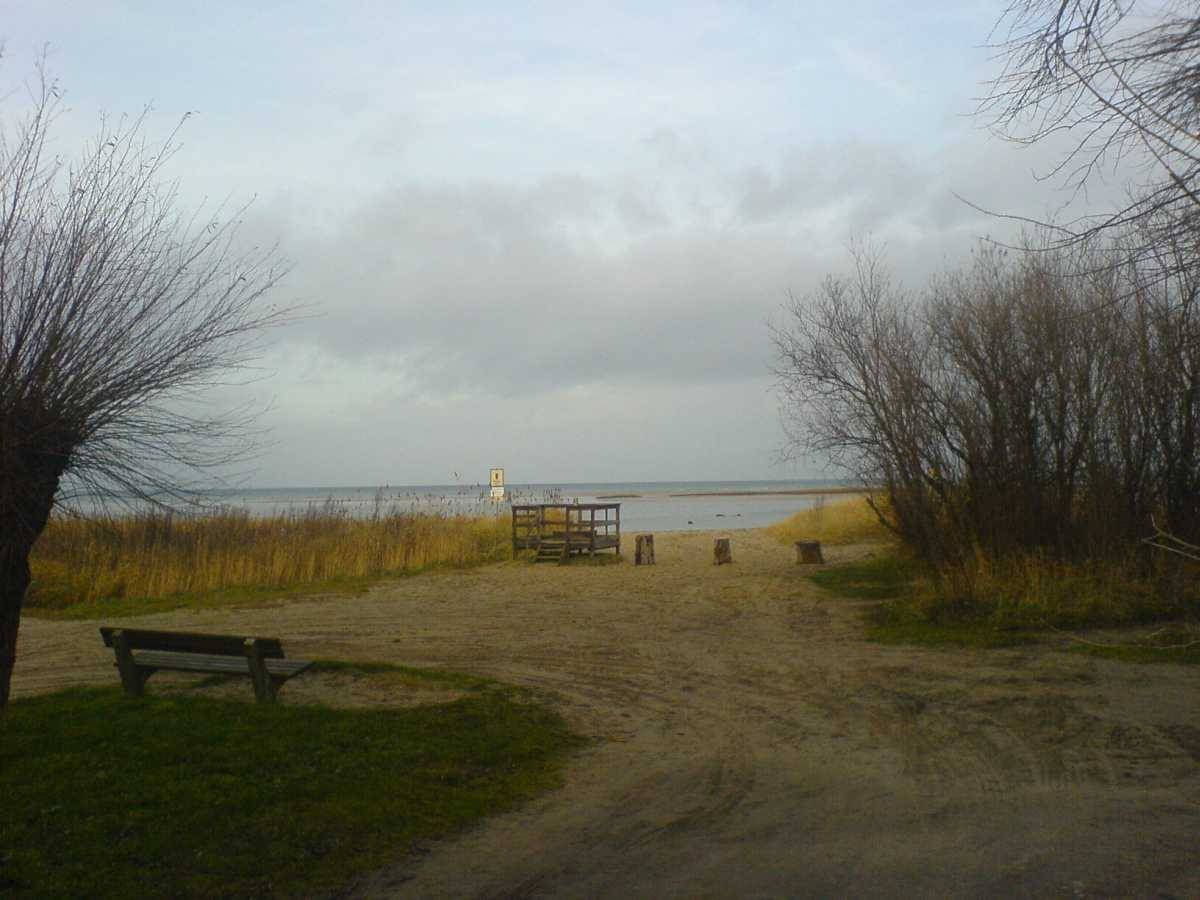
Langenwerder Island

Langenwerder is a small uninhabited island near the island Poel north of Gollwitz, a district of the municipality of Poel island.

It is approximately 800 metres long, 500 metres wide, and flat.

The island is a nature reserve, due to the birds that live there, and therefore access to the island is not usually allowed.
