= Sullom =

Coordinates: 60°26′30″N 1°21′18″W

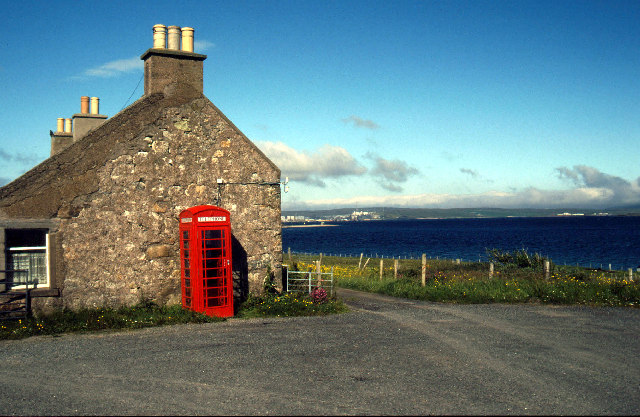
Telephone box in Sullom

Sullom (Shaetlan pronunciation: ['suɫəm] SOO-ləm) is a village on the Shetland peninsula of Northmavine, between Haggrister and Bardister. It lies on the northwest side of Sullom Voe, to which it gives its name.

Sullom hall has been used as a venue during the Shetland Folk Festival.

Scatsta Airfield, on the opposite shore of the Voe, and which grew from the nearby flying boat base of RAF Sullom Voe, is sometimes referred to as 'Sullom Airport'.
