= Brae, Shetland =

Coordinates: 60.396°N 1.351°W

Brae
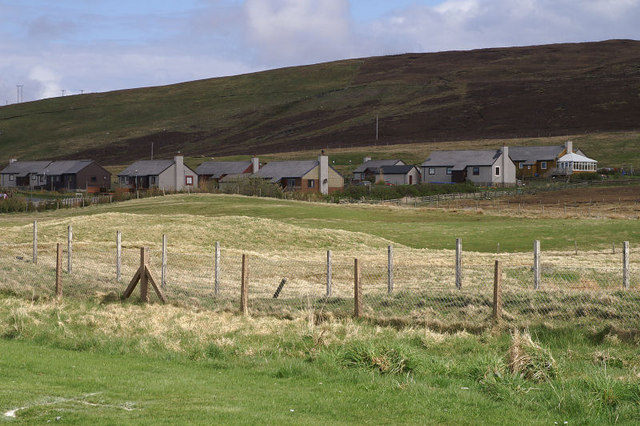
- "Toy Town", Brae

- Location within Shetland
- Population: 750 (2020)
- OS grid reference: HU359681
  - Edinburgh: 314 mi (505 km)
  - London: 616 mi (991 km)
- Civil parish: Delting
- Council area: Shetland
- Lieutenancy area: Shetland
- Country: Scotland
- Sovereign state: United Kingdom
- Post town: SHETLAND
- Postcode district: ZE2
- Dialling code: 01806
- Police: Scotland
- Fire: Scottish
- Ambulance: Scottish
- UK Parliament: Orkney and Shetland
- Scottish Parliament: Shetland

"Brae" is also the Lowland Scots language word for the slope or brow of a hill.

Brae (Shaetlan pronunciation: [breː] BRAY, Old Norse: Breiðeið, meaning "the wide isthmus") is a village on the island of Mainland in Shetland, Scotland, United Kingdom. In 2020 it had a population of 750.

== Description ==
Brae was historically a fishing village, but with the construction of the nearby Sullom Voe Oil Terminal in the 1970s it grew rapidly, merging with the nearby village of Northbrae. It is located at the northern end of Busta Voe, on the narrow isthmus that joins Northmavine to the rest of the Mainland. The village stages its own Up Helly Aa.

The A970 which connects Lerwick to Northmavine forms the main street of Brae. Brae's police and fire stations, schools, and NHS clinic service much of the northern part of the Mainland.

Brae is also home to one of two secondary schools in Shetland that serve all 6 years of Scottish secondary education, the other being in Lerwick. There are two pubs in Brae.

== Etymology ==
Brae is the Lowland Scots word for the slope or brow of a hill. The word 'Brae' in Shetland dialect has a different meaning; it may come from the Old Norse word breiðr meaning broad. The village may take its name from the broad isthmus between Sullom Voe and Busta Voe as opposed to the narrower one a little further west at Mavis Grind. Alternatively the name may mean "a slope to the sea".

== Notable people ==
Jonathan Sutherland, television and radio broadcaster and main anchor of Sportscene, is from Brae.

Erraid Davies is a member of the Delting Dolphins swimming club based in Brae, which claims to be "the most northerly active swimming club in the UK".
