= Breiwick Burn =

Stream on Whalsay, Shetland Islands, Scotland

Coordinates: 60.3294°N 0.9957°W

Breiwick Burn is a burn (stream) in southeastern Whalsay, Shetland Islands, Scotland. The source of the stream is in the Ward of Clette, to the northeast of Clate and north of the quarry. It flows in an easterly direction, curving around to the south and entering the sea at the Ayre of Breiwick, northwest of Meo Ness, and northeast of Hellick.
