= Yell Sound =

Sound of Yell, Scotland

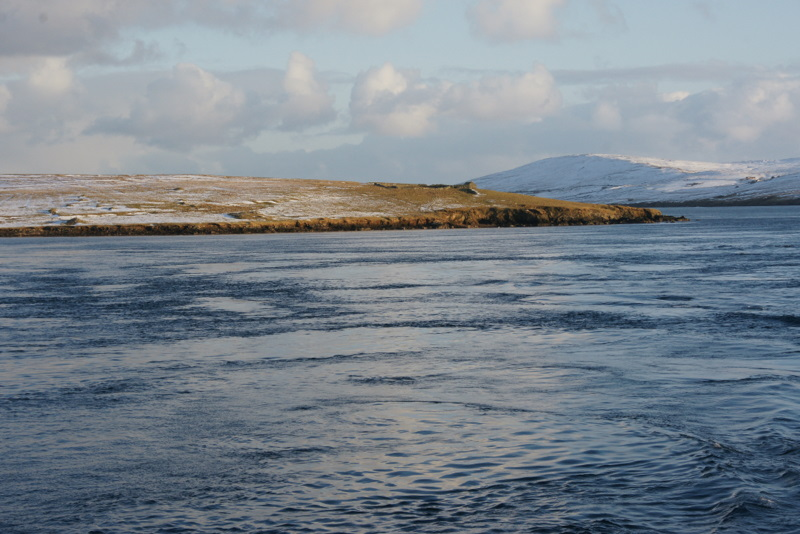
- Yell Sound

- Location within Scotland
- Coordinates: 60.5694°N 1.26°W
- Type: Sound

Yell Sound (Shaetlan pronunciation: [ˈjɛɫ sund] YELL soond) is the Sound running between Yell and Mainland, Shetland, Scotland. It is the boundary between the Mainland and the North Isles, and it contains many small islands. Sullom Voe, on the shores of which is a substantial oil terminal, is an arm of Yell Sound.

The ferry to the North Isles crosses the sound, which can experience strong tides and adverse weather conditions. There are numerous shipwreck sites and several lighthouses to guide shipping. Yell Sound is mentioned briefly in the medieval Orkneyinga saga, and during the 19th century there was a short flourishing of the kelp industry. Commercial fishing has long been a mainstay of the local economy, and part of the sound is a Special Area of Conservation set up to protect local wildlife.

== Early history ==
The Old Norse name was Alasund although the original meaning of the name is not clear. Yell Sound is mentioned briefly in the Orkneyinga saga:

"Earl Rögnvald... and the chiefs Sölmond and Jón with him... had a fine body of troops, thought not too numerous, and five or six ships. They arrived at Hjaltland (Shetland) about the middle of Summer, but heard nothing of Frákork. Strong and contrary winds sprung up, and they brought their ships to Alasund (Yell Sound), and went a-feasting over the country."

== Islands ==
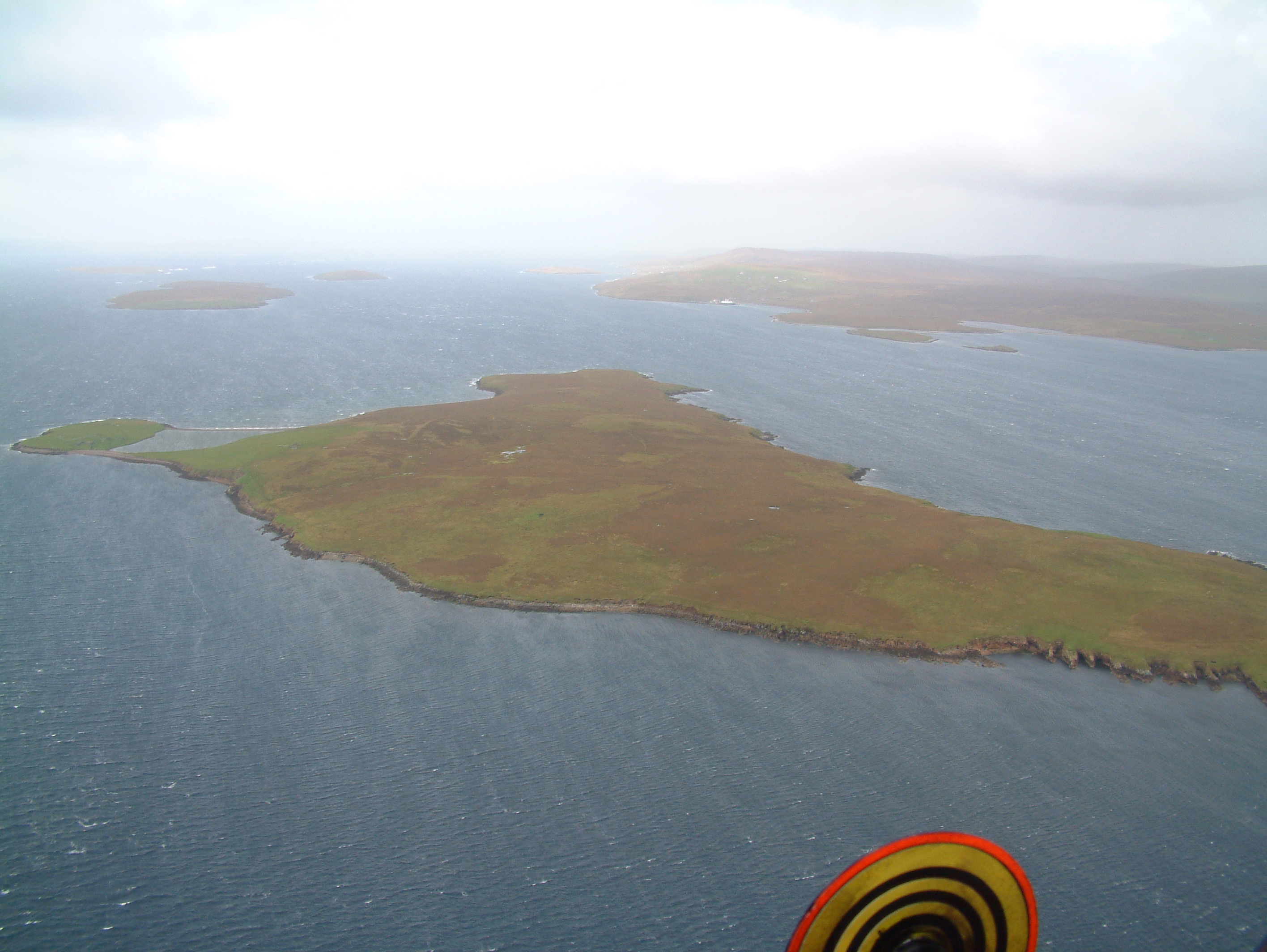
Samphrey and the view northwards towards Bigga and Yell

The north-western approaches to the sound are guarded by a series of small islands north of the Point of Fethland, which is the northernmost land of Northmavine on the Shetland Mainland. The largest of these islands is Gruney and a small archipelago of reefs and skerries lies north of there known as the Ramna Stacks including (from north to south) Gaut Skerries, Outer Stack, Scordar, Turla, Hyter, Ofoora, Fladda, Flae-ass, and Barlcudda.

Yell itself lies east of the sound. South of the headland of Nev of Stuis on Yell there are various islands in the sound including Sweinna Stack, Holm of West Sandwick, Muckle Holm, and Little Holm. Yell Sound narrows between Mio Ness on the Mainland and south Yell. The islands of Bigga, Brother Isle, Lamba, Orfasay, Little Roe, Samphrey and Uynarey lie in this part of the channel.

South of Firth Ness the sound widens and Fish Holm, Linga, Setter Holm, Sinna Skerry, and Wether Holm are found here. The eastern approaches lie between Heoga Ness on Yell and Lunna Ness on the Mainland. Gold Skerry, Green Holm and Neapback Skerries lie off the former and Lunna Holm and Sand Skerry north of the latter.

== Inlets ==
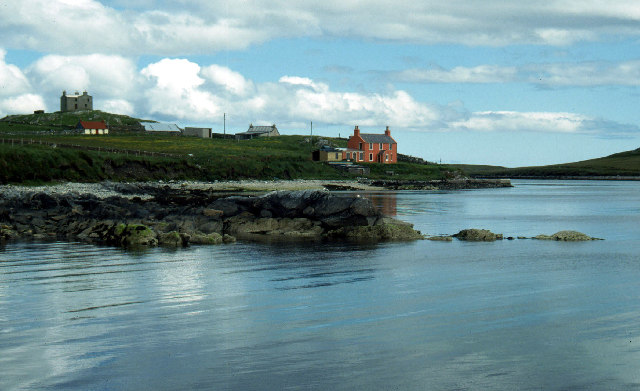
The harbour of Burravoe

There are also numerous large bays and inlets that lead off Yell Sound. The 6-kilometre-long (3.7 mi) Whale Firth on Yell enters the sound at Nev of Stuis. Southladie Voe is some miles south on the western Yell shore to the south of West Sandwick. The large bay of Hamna Voe is at the south end of Yell north of Orfasay island. The much smaller Burra Voe lies just to the east near the village of Burravoe.

The village of North Roe is on the shores of a second Burra Voe on the north Mainland side of the sound. South of there is the larger Colla Firth, separated from Quey Firth by Ness of Queyfirth. Next are Ollaberry Bay, Gluss Voe and Sullom Voe, which is a major inlet and at 12 kilometres (7.5 mi) the longest of Shetland's many voes (Old Norse: "bay"). It contains the Sullom Voe Terminal operated by BP plc and itself has numerous bays and inlets. Sullom Voe terminates at the extraordinary Mavis Grind, a narrow isthmus separating the North Sea from the Atlantic Ocean.

Further south are Orka Voe, Tofts Voe, Firths Voe, Swinister Voe, Dales Voe, a second Colla Firth, Swining Voe, Lumna Voe and a second and smaller Hamna Voe with an inner bay called Boatsroom Voe.

== Ferries ==
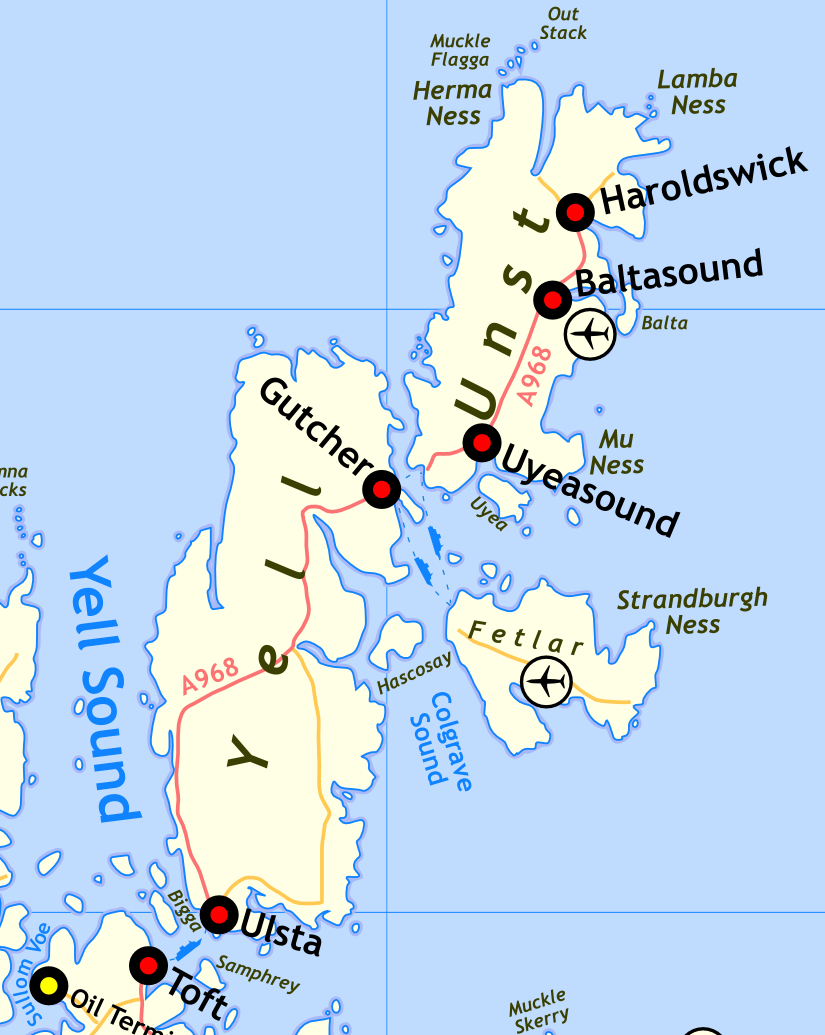
Map of Yell Sound and the North Isles

The ferry from the Mainland to Yell (and then overland on to ferries for Unst and Fetlar) operates between Toft on the Mainland, and Ulsta on Yell, the route being between the island of Samphrey to the east and Bigga to the north. Daggri and Dagalien are roll-on-roll-off ferries that have been operated since 2004 by Shetland Islands Council. Built in Gdańsk, they are each 65 metres (213 ft) long, and are capable of carrying up to 95 passengers and 31 cars or 4 trucks. These boats have a registered tonnage in excess of six times that of the ships they replaced on the route and their increased size has significantly improved transport to the northern isles. The crossing takes about 20 minutes and the services operate at half-hourly intervals.

The first regular ferry to the North Isles was the Janet, which began operating from Lerwick in 1839. The steamer Chieftain's Bride was introduced to this route in 1868 and the SS Lady Ambrosine in 1876. The Earl of Zetland, an iron screw steamer of 253 tons, began a twice weekly Lerwick to Unst service with weekly visits to Out Skerries and the ports of Yell Sound. Originally the service called at numerous small villages in the sound, but after 1932 the stopping-off points were reduced in number due to competition. The ferry twice survived attacks by enemy aircraft during World War 2. A second and larger Earl of Zetland was brought into service after 1945. Weighing 548 tons and with a length of 47.2 metres (155 ft), the ship was popular with summer visitors but cargo was handled by a single derrick and a government subsidy of £100,000 per annum was required to support the operation.

== Shipwrecks ==
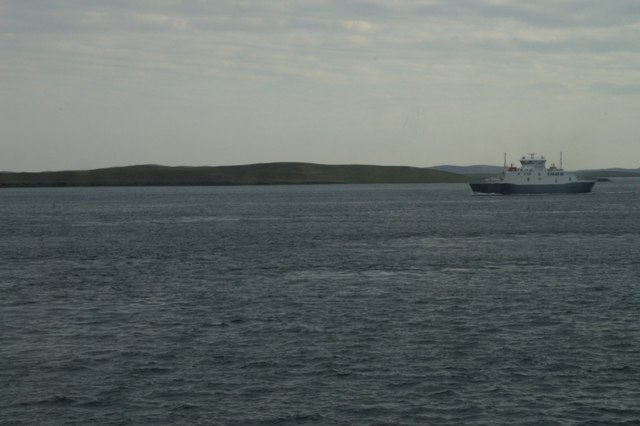
Ferry passing Samphrey in 2007

In addition to the weather conditions, sailing vessels have to contend with strong currents and numerous shipwrecks and hazardous incidents have occurred in and around the sound. In 1832 a fishing boat from Samphrey was caught out in a storm and blown all the way to Norway. The crew returned safely to Shetland the following spring to the relief of their families, who had presumed them drowned.

The 18-ton wooden fishing smack Ellen was wrecked on the Rumble Rock, (between Samphrey and Orfasay) on 27 April 1896. In March 1904 the trawler Ibis was wrecked at the same location during a snowstorm, the crew being rescued by the trawler Sunbeam. In June 1914 the 50.2 metres (165 ft) steamer Robert Lea was grounded on Stoura Baa at the north end of Brother Isle en route from Colla Firth to Liverpool also without loss of life. In 1992 the wreck was located in 10 metres (33 ft) of water. The 22 metres (72 ft) fishing boat Morning Star sank approximately 1.5 kilometres (0.93 mi) north west of Muckle Holm lighthouse whilst under tow after a fire broke out in the engine room. In 1983, the Royal Navy cleared ordnance from Little Holm, and their bomb disposal team discovered an unrecorded shipwreck nearby. Its identity is still unknown. There are no protected shipwrecks in the sound.

== Lighthouses ==
There are several lights operated by the Northern Lighthouse Board guiding shipping in the sound. To the north Bagi Stack Lighthouse on Yell to the east, and Gruney and Point of Fethaland to the west are the outer lights. To the south, the outermost light is at Lunna Holm Lighthouse. Within the sound from north to south the lights are Muckle Holm Lighthouse, Little Holm Lighthouse, Lamba South Lighthouse, Outer Skerry Lighthouse, Brother Isle Lighthouse, Ness of Sound Lighthouse, Rumble Rock Lighthouse (since 2001) and Firths Voe Lighthouse on the Mainland.

== Commercial activities ==
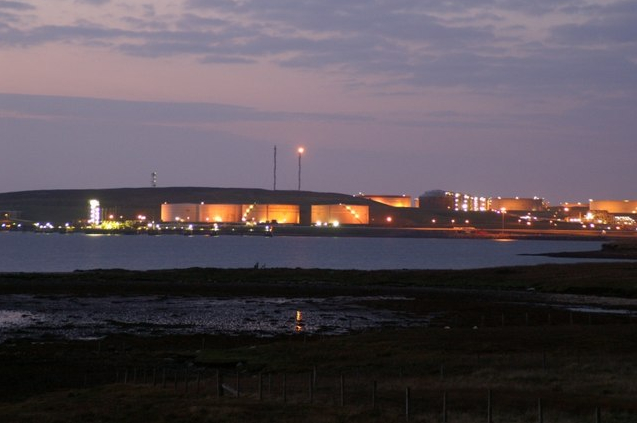
Sullom Voe oil terminal at dusk

The northern part of the sound provides fishing grounds for haddock, herring and crabs. The inner sound has commercial scallop beds and various fish and shellfish farms. The profusion of seaweeds including wrack (Fucus serratus) and tangle (Laminaria digitata) was briefly exploited for commercial purposes. Between 1870 and the end of the nineteenth century, several hundred tons of kelp used in the production of iodine and bromine were exported annually from Unst, Yell and the mainland shores of Yell Sound. The many small fires burning along the shores apparently made a lasting impression on visitors.

Away from the beaches, Yell Sound is little used for recreational purposes, possibly due to the relatively high volume of tonnage accessing Sullom Voe. As a primary navigation channel, the entire sound is under the control of Shetland Islands Council's Ports and Harbours Operations authority and has been identified as a body of water "At Risk" of not meeting the EU Water Framework Directive.

== Wildlife ==
Part of the sound is as Special Area of Conservation (SAC), in part due to the high concentration of otters. The Shetland populations are possibly the densest in Europe and up to 2% of the British population may live in the site. The low-lying peaty coastlines provide easy access to fresh water, extensive algal beds in the marine environment and large numbers of otter holts. There is also a significant population of the common seal with the local colony representing over 1% of the UK population. Sullom Voe is a separate SAC, qualifying due to the numerous large shallow inlets and bays, coastal reefs and lagoons.

There are horse mussel (Modiolus modiolus) beds both within Sullom Voe and on the mainland coast near Colla Firth. Cetaceans are regularly sited in the inner sound, especially harbour porpoise, minke whale and killer whale and there are a wide variety of breeding seabirds, divers and ducks including eider.

== Gallery ==
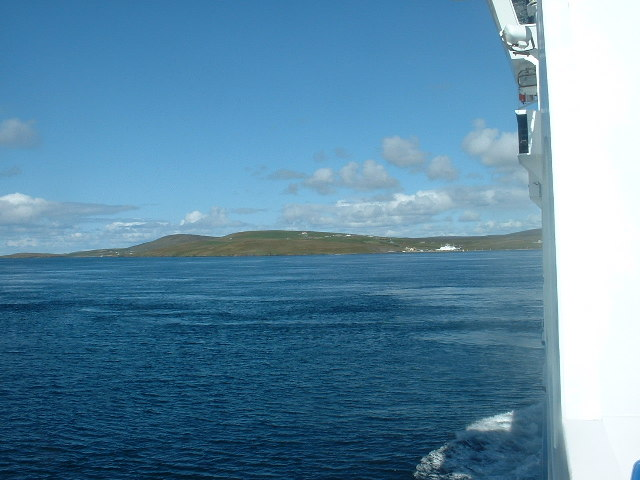
Yell Sound, Shetland. Taken from the Ferry Dagalien, northwards towards the island of Yell.

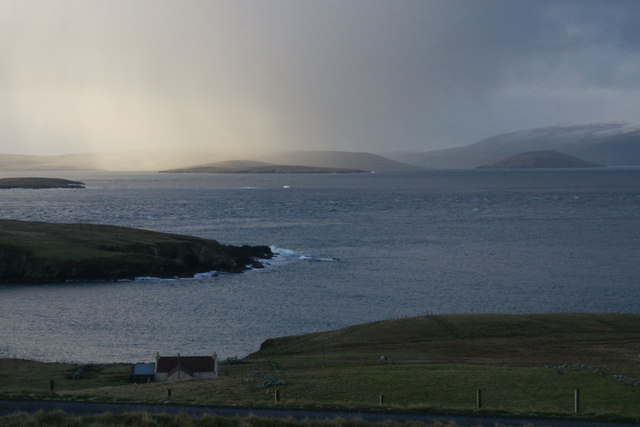
View over Yell Sound at West Yell West Yell and the Ness of Sound are in the foreground

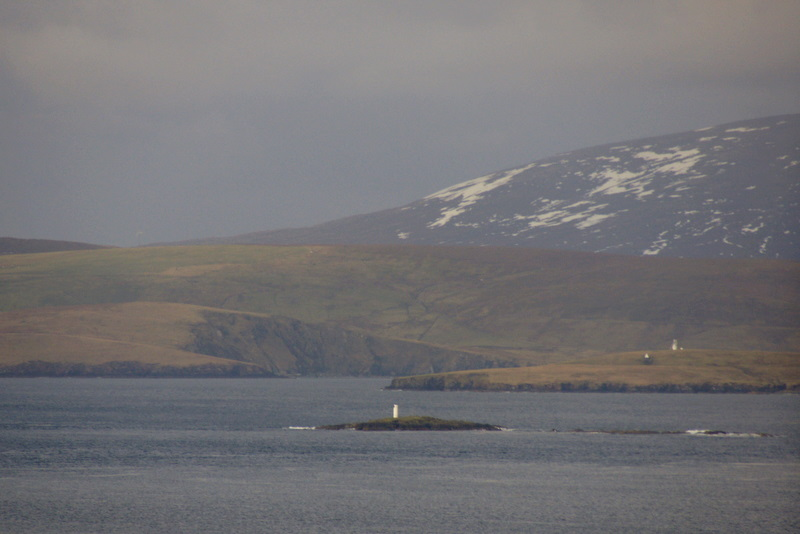
Tinga Skerry, Yell Sound

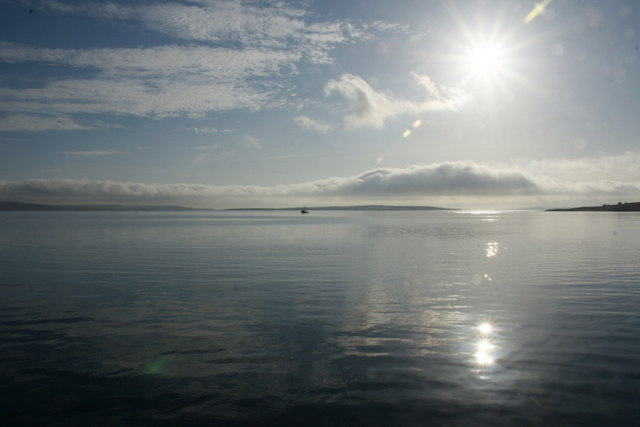
Yell Sound from Toft

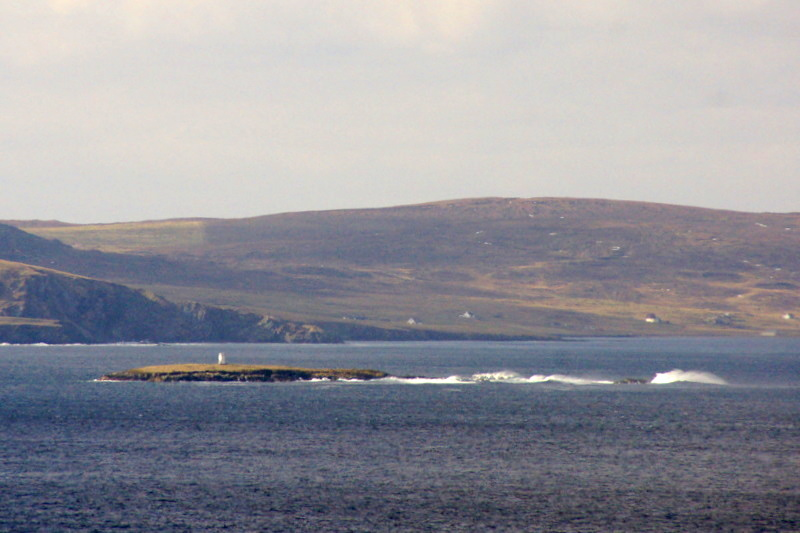
Little Holm, Yell Sound

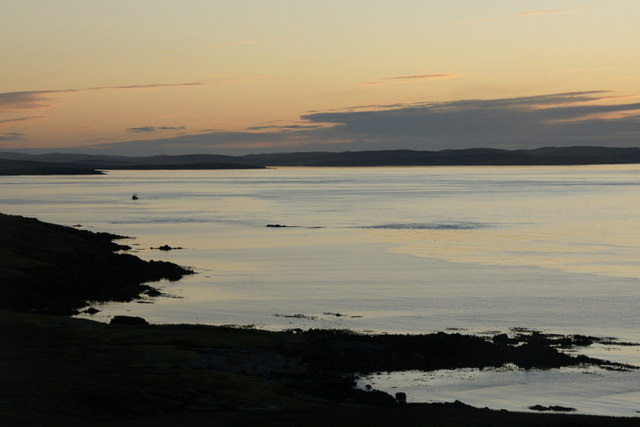
Yell Sound at dusk

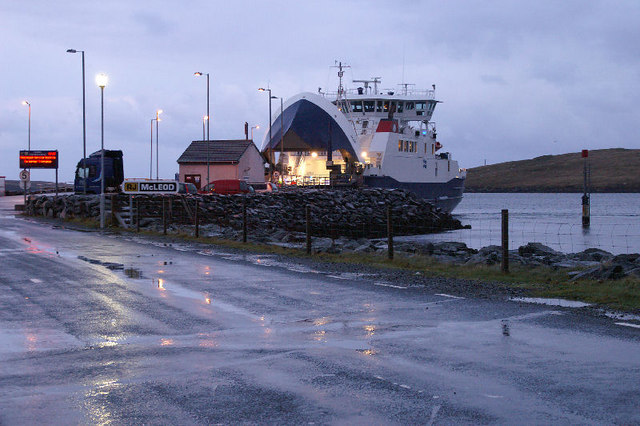
Yell Sound ferry at Toft

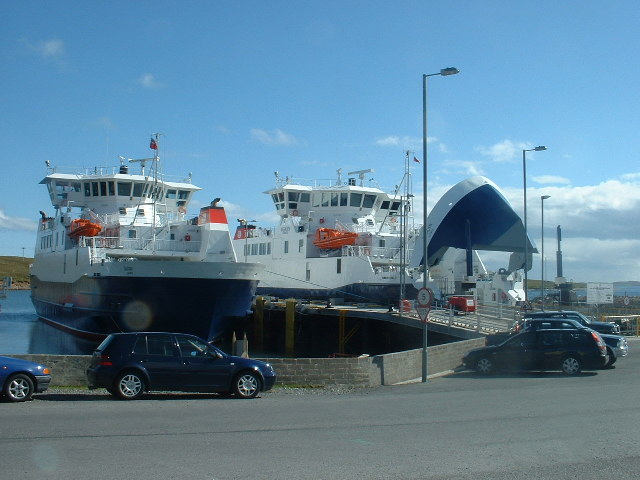
Daggri (dawn) and Dagalien (dusk) at Ulsta. These are ferries that run between Toft on Mainland and Yell

== See also ==
- Balta Sound
- Bluemull Sound
- Sounds of Scotland
- List of Shetland islands
