= Bigga, Shetland =

Uninhabited island in Shetland, Scotland

Bigga
Location
- Bigga shown within Shetland
- OS grid reference: HU444792
- Coordinates: 60.50°N 1.19°W

Name
- Name meaning: Old Norse for "island of the building"
- Old Norse name: Bygðey

Physical geography
- Island group: Shetland
- Area: 78 ha (0.30 sq mi)
- Area rank: 164=
- Highest elevation: 34 m (112 ft)

Administration
- Council area: Shetland Islands
- Country: Scotland
- Sovereign state: United Kingdom

Demographics
- Population: 0

Bigga is an uninhabited island in the Yell Sound between the Mainland and Yell in Shetland, Scotland.

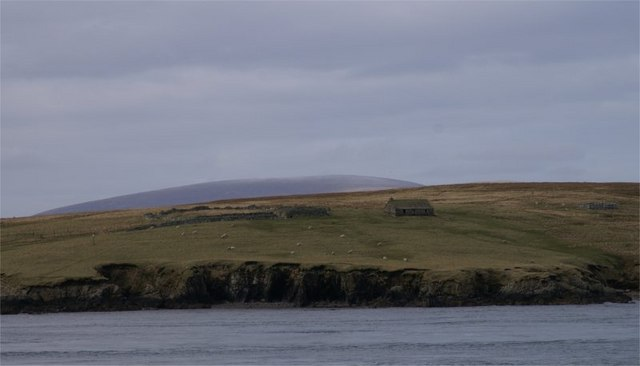
Bigga

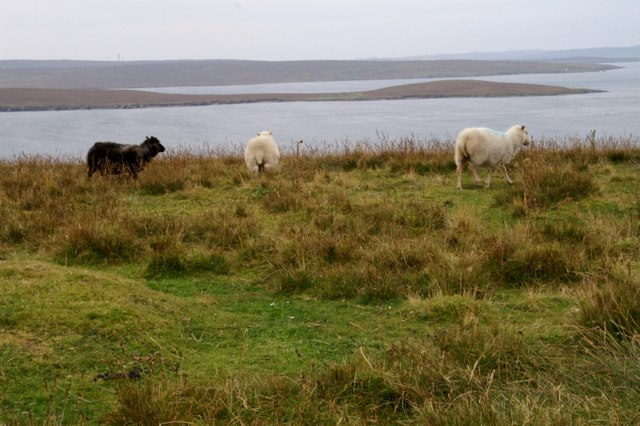
Sheep in south Yell, with Bigga behind

== Geography and geology ==
Just over 1,000 metres (1,100 yd) long, Bigga is 78 hectares (0.30 sq mi) in size, and is 34 metres (112 ft) tall at its highest point. Bigga is a long thin island with a "head" and a "torso". The neck is formed by the bays of Wester Hevda Wick and Easter Hevda Wick, "hevda wick" being an anglicisation of the Norn/Old Norse for "seaweed bay".

Cattle and sheep were formerly farmed here.

The island belongs at the same time in common to the civil parishes of Delting and Yell.

Bigga consists of Moine bedrock of coarsely-crystalline gneiss and quartzite.

== History ==
It is thought that the name comes from the Old Norse bygðey meaning "island of the building", which may refer to an old structure.

In the southern part of the island, there are an old well, chapel and burial ground. There is a small prehistoric cairn in the north of the island. In the north are the remains of Norrabister, the island's "settlement".

The Pribislaw, a 160-year-old German sailing vessel ran aground here in 1870. She had been one of many sailing boats that took German emigrants from Hamburg to Victoria, in Australia, around the middle of the 19th century. Moved to Lerwick, she was used as a store and workshop until the 1950s. In 2005 the remaining timbers were excavated and transported to Whittlesea, Australia.

During World War II, two sailors from neighbouring Yell wanted to return to their native island to celebrate Yule (Christmas) during their shore leave. The weather was stormy and snowy and the usual ferry between the Mainland and Yell was not running, so they borrowed a friend's boat. Forced to land on Bigga, they sheltered in the bothy and danced, and played the fiddle in order to stay warm. They managed to reach Yell the next day.

== Modern Uses of the name ==
The MV Bigga is a ro-ro passenger ferry named after the island that operates in the sound containing her namesake.
