= West Mainland =

Western area of Mainland, Shetland Islands, Scotland

Coordinates: 60°15′N 1°30′W

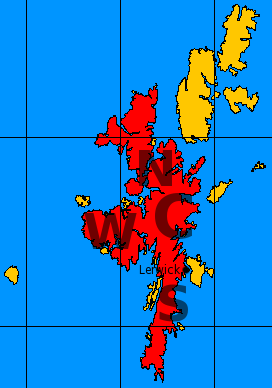
West, Central, North and South Mainland

The West Mainland of the Shetland Islands is the part of the Shetland Mainland lying west of Aith (1° 23′ W).

== Geography ==
Points of interest include:

- Aith
- Twatt
- Sandness
- Walls
- Easter Skeld
- Reawick
- Wester Skeld
