= Lunna Ness =

Peninsula in Shetland Islands, Scotland

Coordinates: 60°25′27″N 1°5′12″W

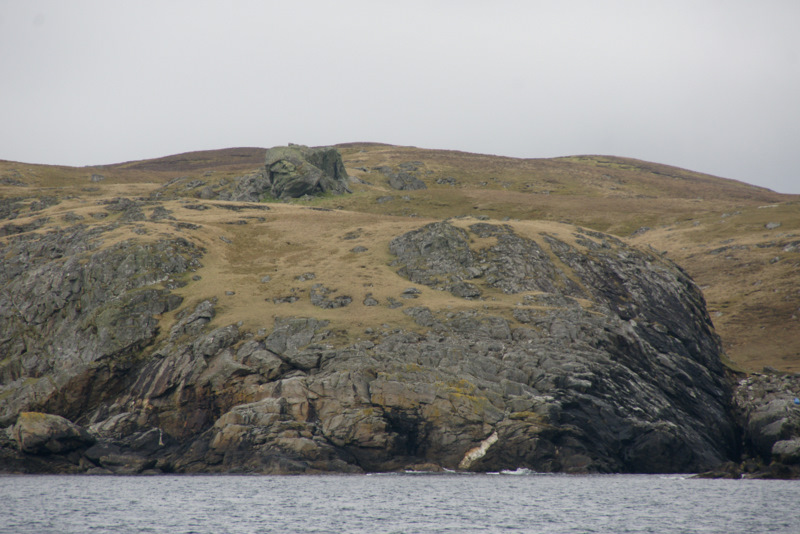
The Stanes of Stofast above the cliffs of east Lunna Ness

Lunna Ness is a peninsula in the north east of Mainland, Shetland, Scotland, in the parish of Lunnasting near Vidlin. The island of Lunna Holm is nearby. The Shetland Bus operation during World War II used this area as a base.

The Stanes of Stofast is a 2,000 tonne glacial erratic that came to rest on a prominent hilltop.

The Lunnasting stone is a monolith bearing an ogham inscription discovered in the area and donated to the National Museum of Antiquities of Scotland in 1876. It was found by Rev. J.C. Roger in a cottage, who stated that the stone had been unearthed from a "moss" (i.e. a peat bog) in April 1876, having been originally discovered five feet (1.5 m) below the surface.

Lunna Ness is a Site of Special Scientific Interest based on the abundance of the otter population.

Lunna House is a 17th-century laird's house, noted for having "the best historic designed landscape in Shetland". In the 20th century it was used as a base of the wartime Shetland Bus operation.
