= Brother Isle =

Small, uninhabited island in Shetland, Scotland

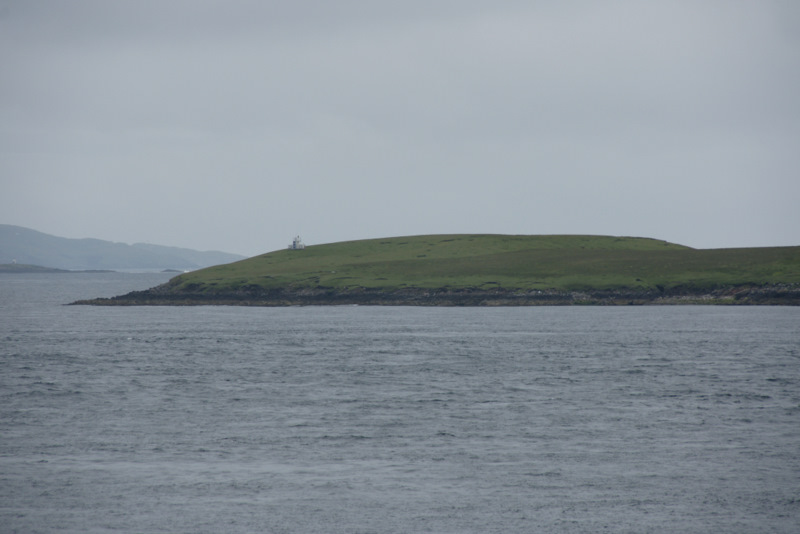
- West end of Brother Isle

Location
- Brother Isle shown within Shetland
- OS grid reference: HU425815
- Coordinates: 60.52°N 1.22°W

Name
- Name meaning: broad beach island
- Old Norse name: breiðare øy

Physical geography
- Island group: Shetland
- Area: 40 hectares (99 acres)
- Area rank: 220=
- Highest elevation: 25 metres (82 ft)

Administration
- Council area: Shetland Islands
- Country: Scotland
- Sovereign state: United Kingdom

Demographics
- Population: 0

Brother Isle (Old Norse: breiðare øy meaning broad beach island) is a small, uninhabited island in Shetland, Scotland. It lies between the islands of Yell and Shetland Mainland. It is 40 hectares (99 acres) in size.

== Geography and geology ==
The island's rock is "undifferentiated moine gneiss and quartzite."

== History ==
It is sometimes assumed that the "Brother" in the name refers to Culdees/papar who were frequent inhabitants of the smaller islands, however, in this case there is no apparent evidence for this claim, and it would appear to be merely folk etymology.

At only 40 hectares in size (about 1/6 of a sq. mile) and surrounded by tidal rips which make landing difficult, it would seem unlikely that the island has ever been inhabited. However, Brother Isle was inhabited until the 1820s, latterly by brothers with the surname Tulloch. This led to the mistaken assumption that the island's name referred to them.

In 2004, a lighthouse was built on the island.
