= Sullom Voe =

Inlet in Shetland

Coordinates: 60°27′N 1°18′W

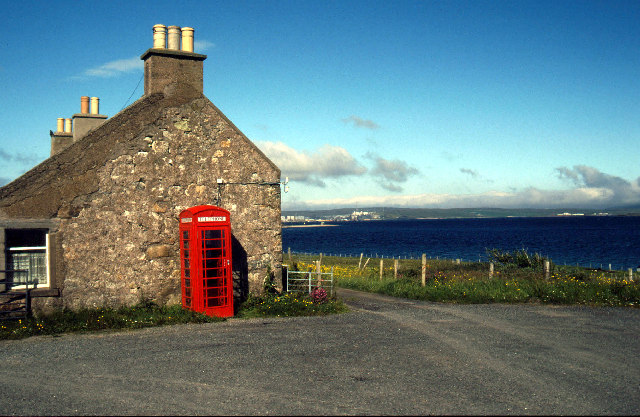
View across the voe from the hamlet of Sullom

Sullom Voe (Shaetlan pronunciation: [ˈsuɫəm voː] SOO-ləm-voh) is an eight-mile-long voe or inlet off Yell Sound in the Shetland Islands. It divides the Northmavine peninsula from the remainder of Mainland (the two are connected by an isthmus at the head of the voe known as Mavis Grind). It is well known as the location of the Sullom Voe Oil Terminal.

During the Second World War, the voe was used as a base for flying boats. There were two RAF stations, RAF Sullom Voe and RAF Scatsta. With the coming of the oil terminal, Scatsta was upgraded and modernised to create Scatsta Airport.
