= Mainland, Shetland =

Main island of the Shetland Islands, Scotland

Mainland
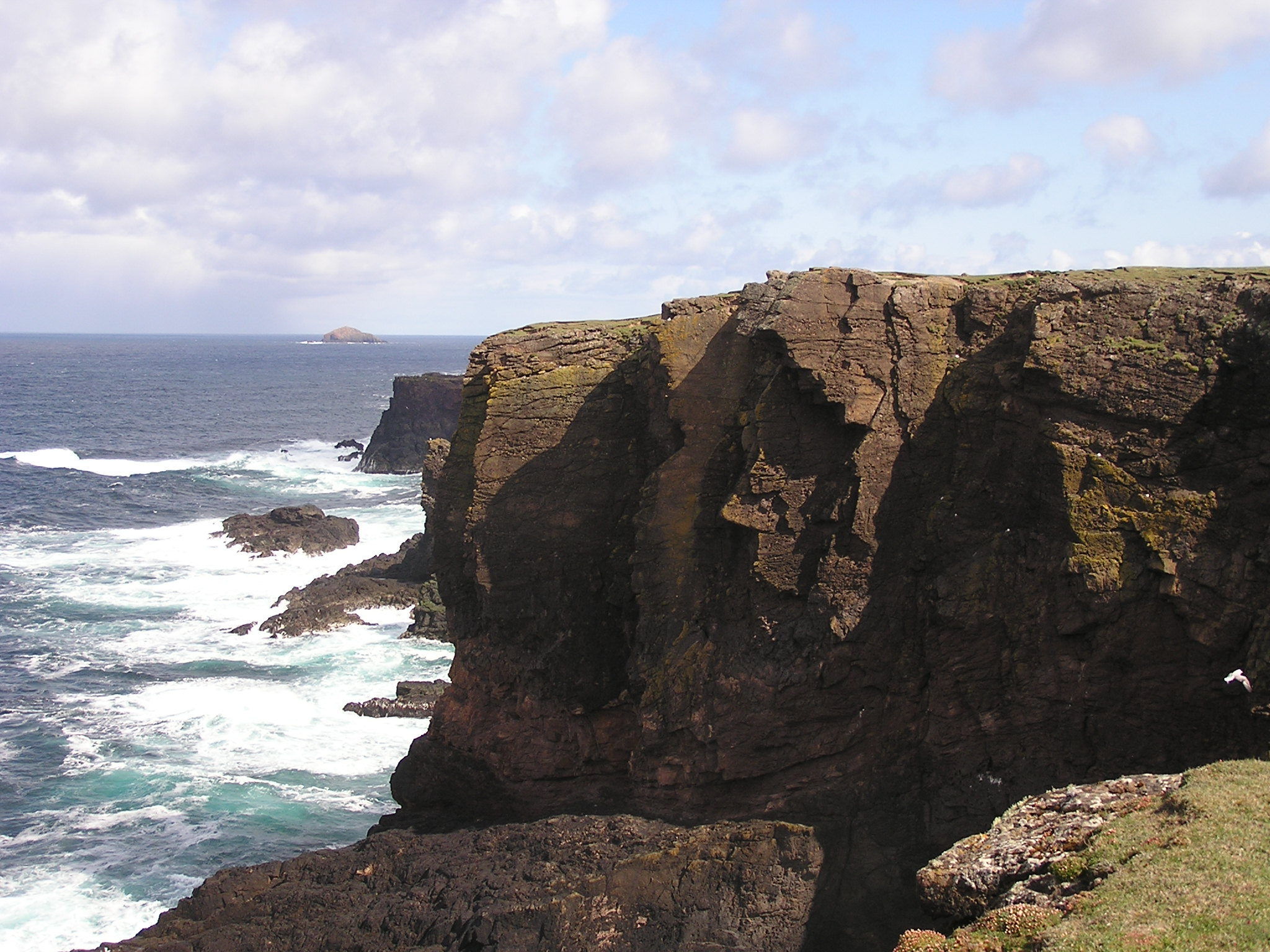
- The cliffs of Eshaness, North Mainland

Location

- Location within Scotland
- OS grid reference: HU414553
- Coordinates: 60.30°N 1.30°W

Name
- Name meaning: Old Norse for 'mainland'
- Old Norse name: Megenland

Physical geography
- Island group: Shetland
- Area: 899 km^{2} (347 sq mi)
- Highest elevation: Ronas Hill 450 m (1,476 ft)

Administration
- Council area: Shetland Islands
- Country: Scotland
- Sovereign state: United Kingdom

Demographics
- Population: 18,763
- Population density: 19.40 people/km^{2}
- Largest settlement: Lerwick

The Mainland is the principal island of Shetland in Scotland. Covering an area of 899 km^{2} (347 sq mi), the island contains Shetland's only burgh, Lerwick, which is the main administrative centre, and major point of Shetland's ferry and air connections. The island has a diversified economy, with interests in agriculture, fishing, aquaculture, oil and gas, and tourism. It also forms part of a UNESCO Global Geopark, noted for its cliffs, moorlands, and diverse marine wildlife. Mainland is also the largest island in the North Sea.

== History ==
Evidence from various archaeological sites indicate probable human settlements dating back to more than six thousand years. In the 9th century CE, it came under the influence of the Vikings, and the island was claimed by Scotland in the 14th century. Many of the place names still bear Norse influence from the Viking era.

== Geography ==
Mainland is the principal island of Shetland, which forms part of Scotland. The island lies north of mainland Scotland, between the Orkney Islands and Faroe Islands, sandwiched between the Atlantic Ocean to the west and the North Sea to the east. Covering an area of 899 km^{2} (347 sq mi), the island contains Shetland's only burgh, Lerwick, which is the main administrative centre. The island has a rugged long coastline stretching 848.35 km (527.14 mi). It is politically part of the United Kingdom, though the islands has local governance bodies.

The mainland is broadly divided into four geographical sections. North Mainland covers the large Northmavine peninsula which is connected by a narrow isthmus at Mavis Grind and incorporates the highest point of the island at Ronas Hill, and oil facilities. Central Mainland consists of the Tigwall valley, made up of fertile farmlands, plantations, and ancient castles. West Mainland incorporates the western region, and the South Mainland, south of Lerwick, which contains important archaeological sites.

Mainland has a temperate climate with warm summers, and mild winters with heavy rainfall and no dry season. It forms part of a UNESCO Global Geopark, and is noted for its cliffs, moorlands, and diverse marine wildlife.

== Demographics and economy ==
Mainland had a population of 18,763 residents in 2022, with Lerwick the most populous with about 6,000 inhabitants. The island has well developed infrastructure with schools, healthcare, and cultural services. The economy is diversified and broad-based with interests in agriculture, fishing, aquaculture, oil and gas, and tourism. Mainland has extensive resources and attracts workers due to its low unemployment rates.

The island has a well developed road network. Inter-island ferries, connect with other islands and the United Kingdom, with the major port situated at Sullom Voe. Lerwick Airport and Sumburgh Airport serve the island with regular commercial flights.

== See also ==
- List of islands of Scotland
- List of islands of the British Isles
- Mainland, Orkney
