= List of places in the Western Isles =

See the list of places in Scotland for places in other counties.

This List of places in the Western Isles (na h-Eileanan Siar) is a list of links for any town, village, hamlet, island, port, river, harbour, historic house, nature reserve and other place of interest in the na h-Eileanan Siar (Western Isles) council area of Scotland.

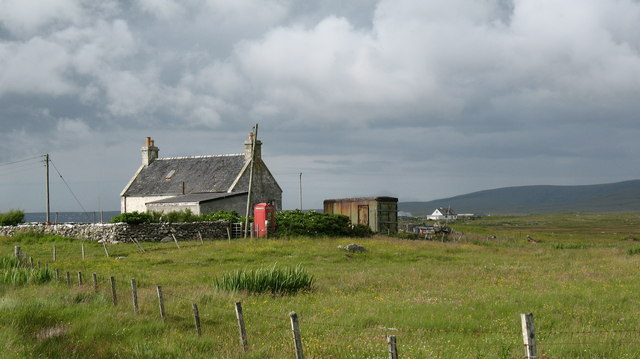
Baleshare phone box

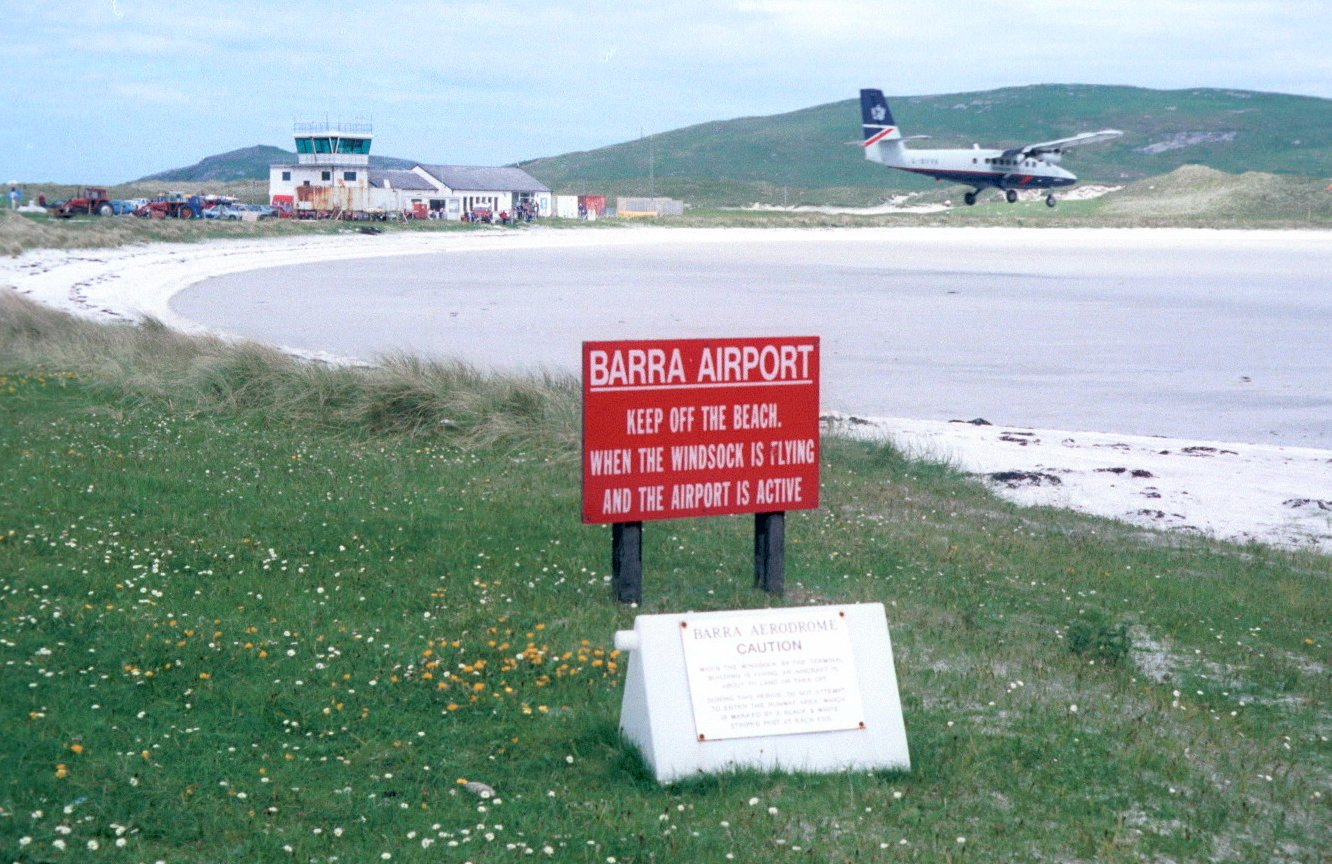
Barra Airport

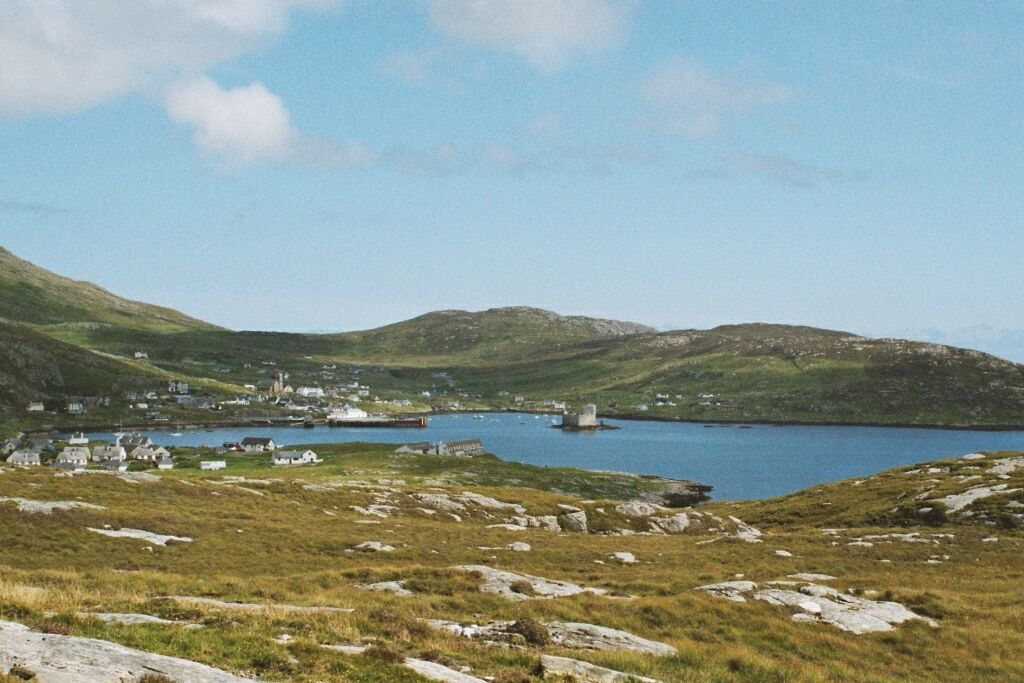
Castlebay, Barra

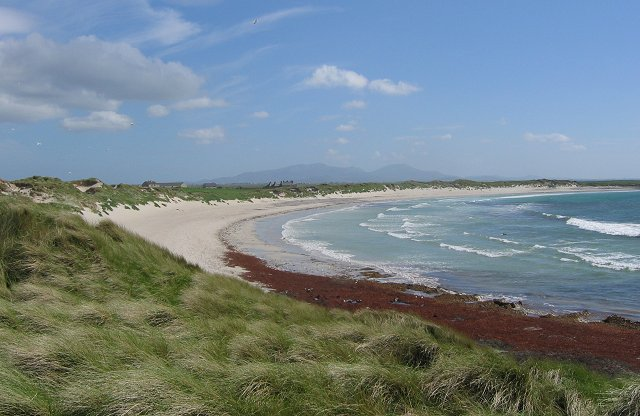
Benbecula Beach

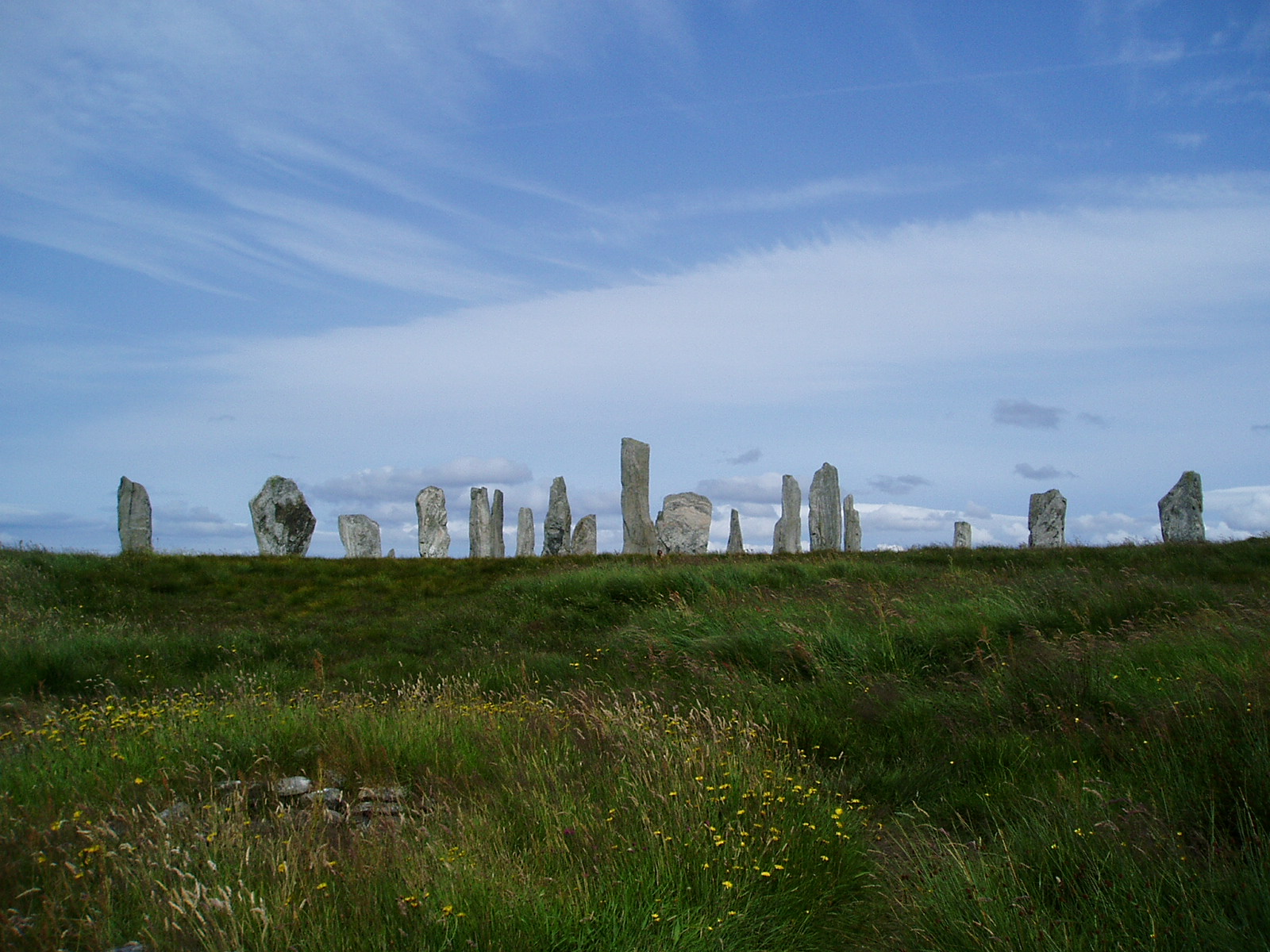
Callanish Stone Circle

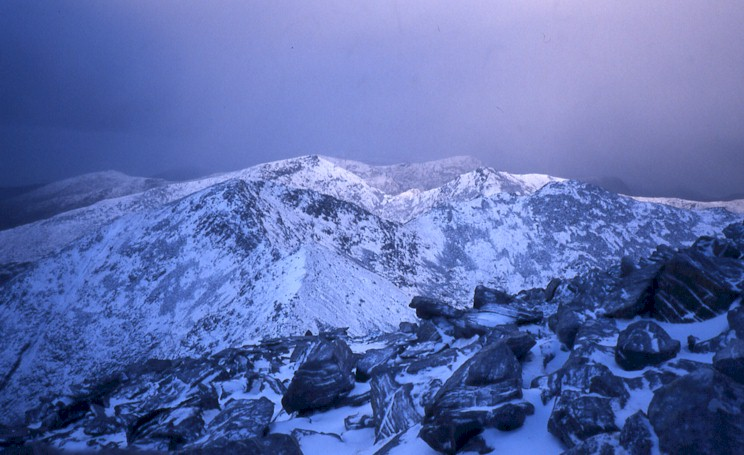
The Clisham

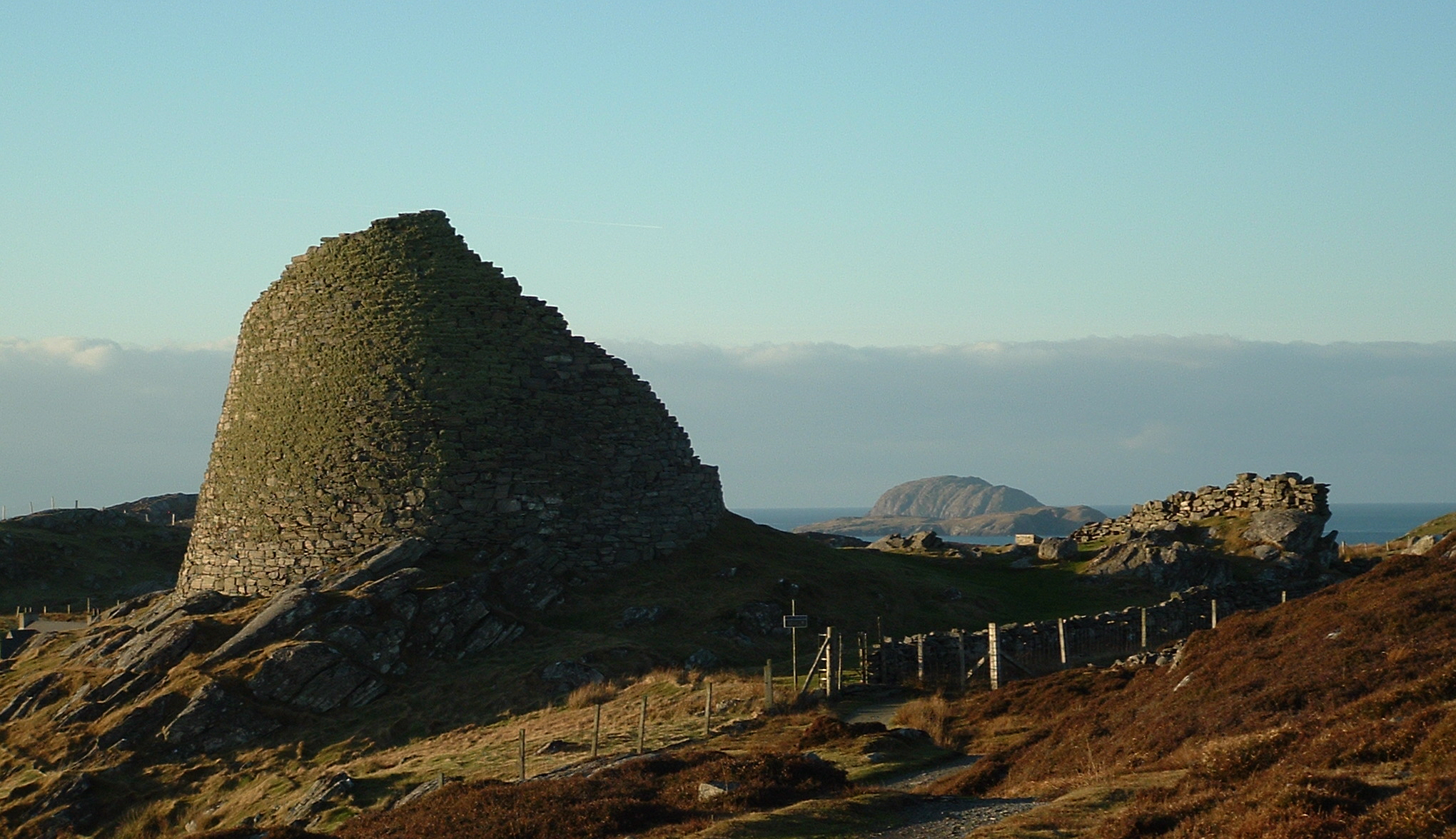
Dun Carloway Broch

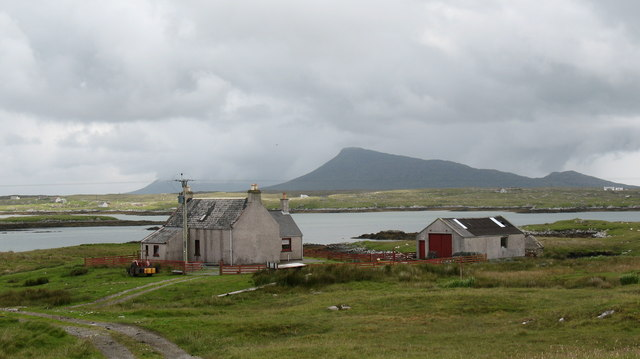
Flodaigh

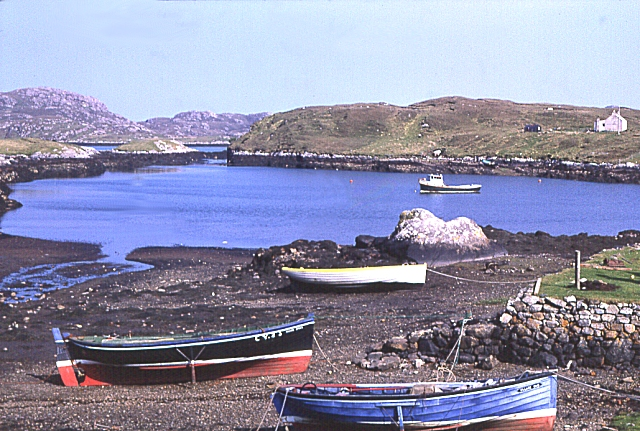
Grimsay, Bagh Mor

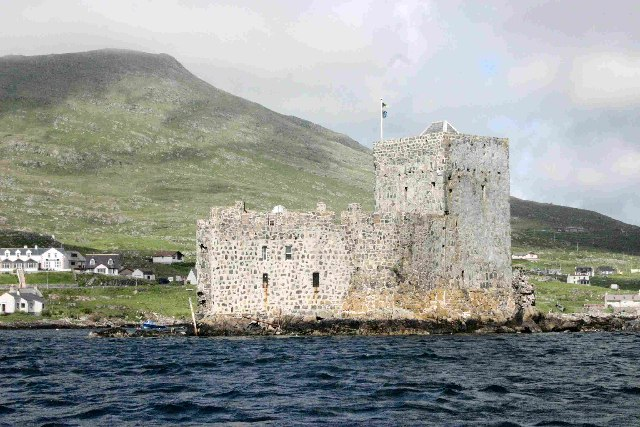
Kisimul Castle

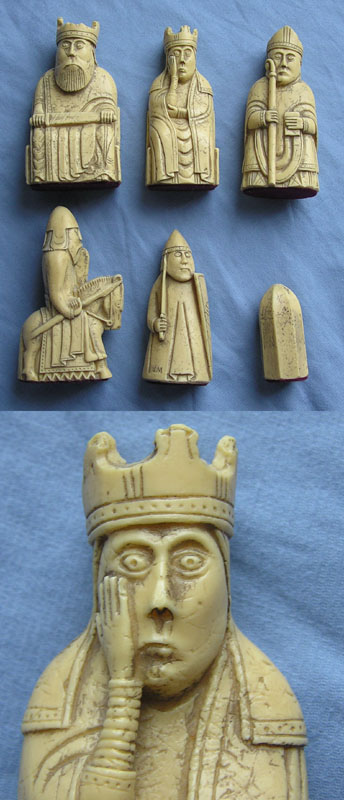
Lewis chessmen

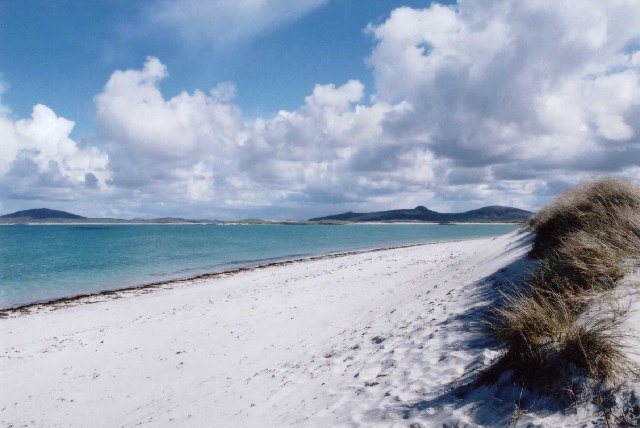
North Uist near Solas

Rodel, St. Clement's Church

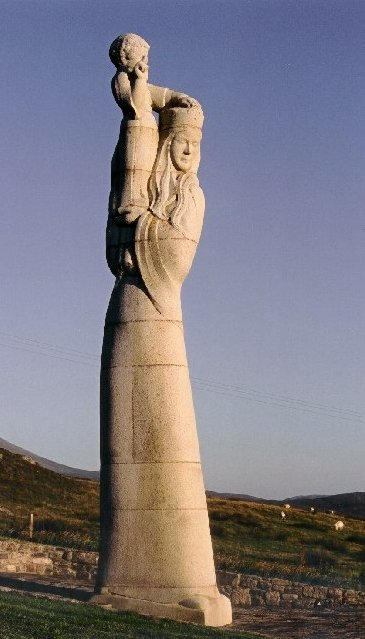
South Uist, Our Lady of the Isles

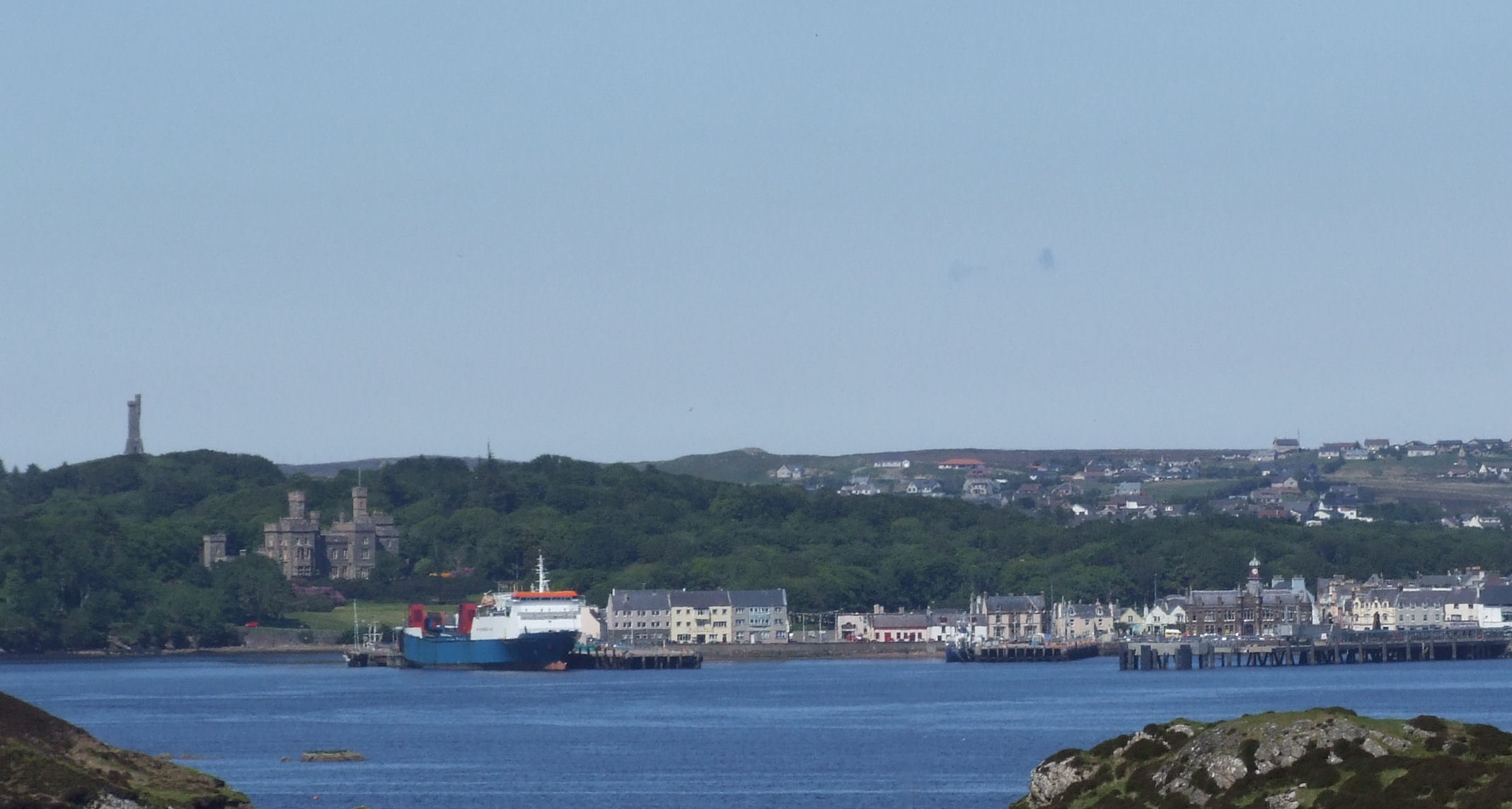
Stornoway Harbour

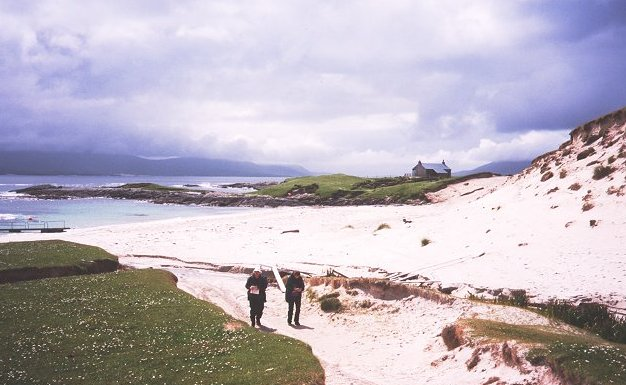
Beach at Taransay

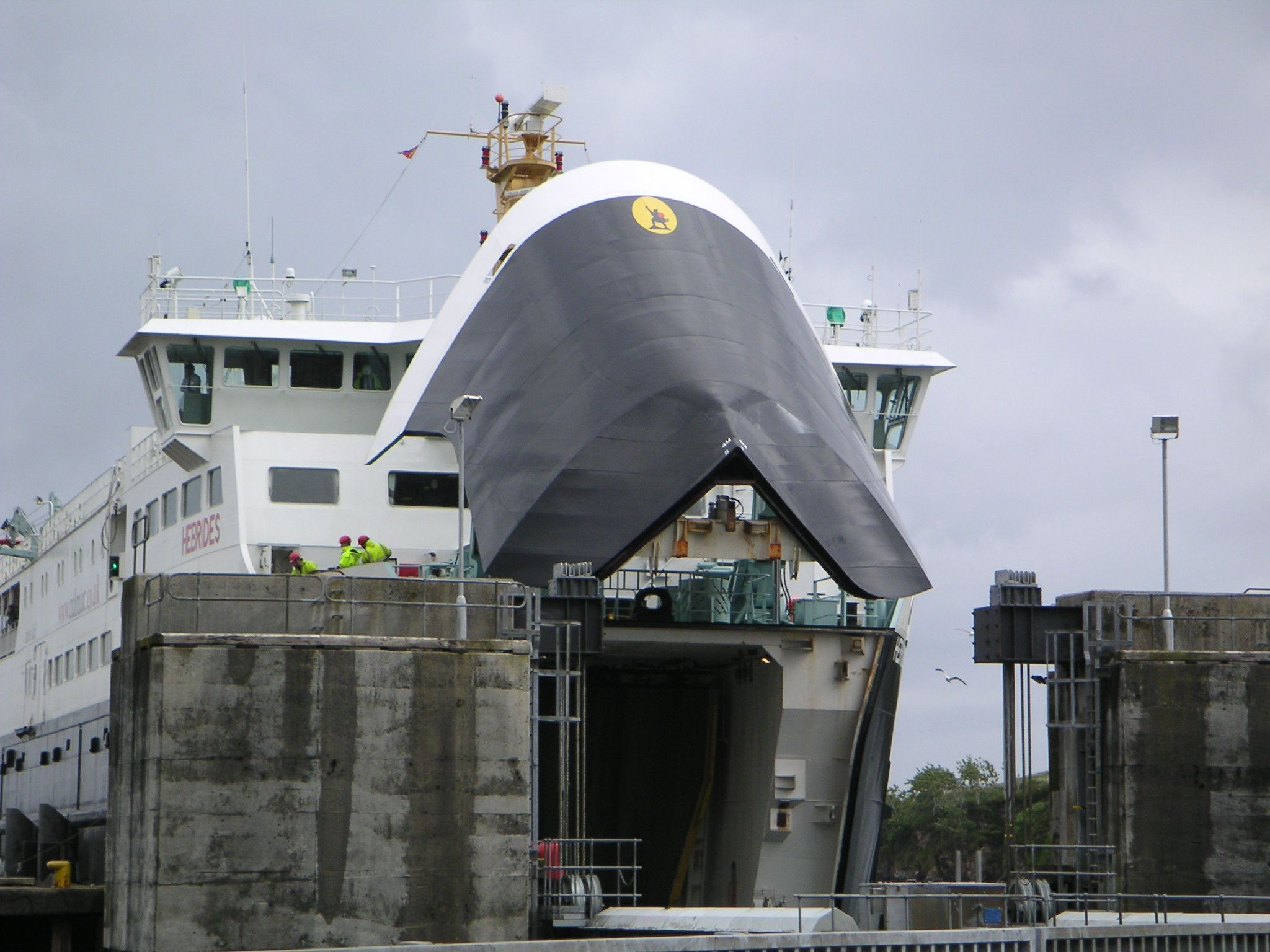
Tarbert to Uig ferry

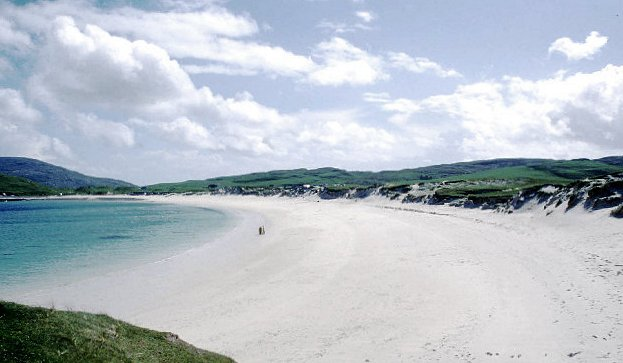
Vatersay Bay

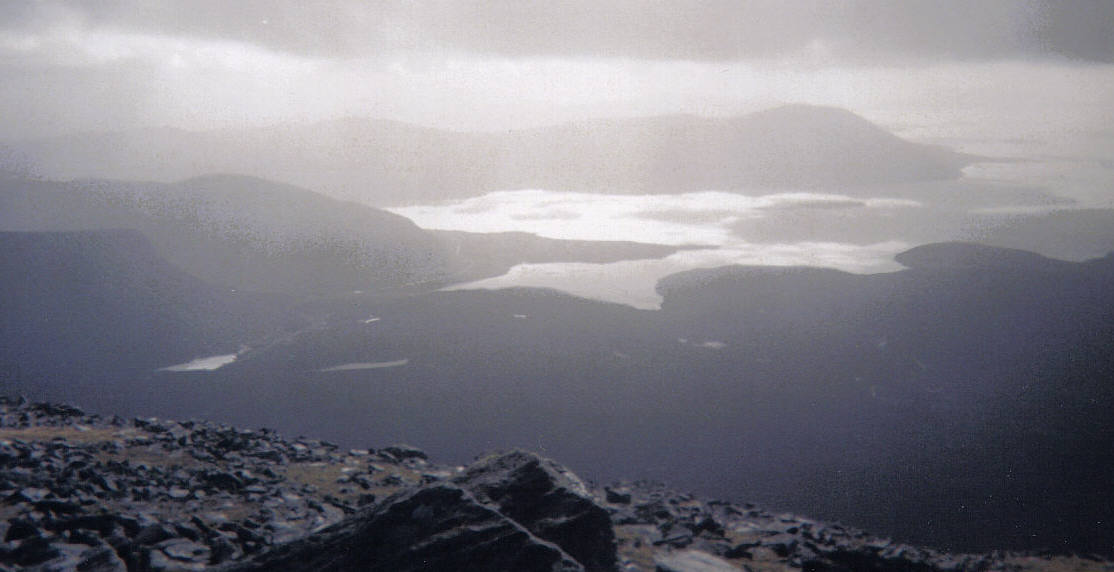
West Loch Tarbert from Clisham

== A ==
- Adabroc (Adabrog)
- Aignish (Aiginis)
- Aird (Àird an Rubha)
- Allasdale (Allathasdal)
- Ardvay

== B ==
- Balallan (Baile Ailein)
- Baleshare (Am Baile Sear)
- Balivanich (Baile a' Mhanaich)
- Ballantrushal (Baile an Truiseil)
- Barpa Langass (Barpa Langais)
- Barra (Barraigh), Barra Airport (Port-adhair Bharraigh), Barra Head (Beàrnaraigh Cheann Bharraigh), Bruernish (Bruthairnais), Barra Isles
- Barvas (Barabhas)
- Bayble (Pabail)
- Bayhead (Ceann a' Bhàigh)
- Benbecula (Beinn nam Fadhla), Benbecula Airport (Port-adhair Bheinn na Fadhla)
- Berneray (Beàrnaraigh)
- Borve (Borgh)
- Bragar (Bràgar)
- Breaclete (Breacleit)
- Butt of Lewis (Rubha Robhanais)

== C ==
- Callanish (Calanais), Callanish Stones (Clachan Chalanais), Callanish VIII
- Calvay (Calbhaigh)
- Carinish (Càirinis)
- Carloway (Càrlabhagh)
- Castlebay (Bàgh a' Chaisteil)
- Cille Bharra
- Clach an Trushal (Clach an Truiseil)
- Clisham (An Cliseam)
- Craigstrom (Creagastrom)
- Creagorry (Creag Ghoraidh)

== D ==
- Daliburgh (Dalabrog)
- Dun Carloway (Dùn Chàrlabhaigh)

== E ==
- Eilean Chearstaidh (Eilean Kerstay)
- Eilean Dòmhnuill
- Eriskay (Èirisgeigh)

== F ==
- Fiaraigh
- Finsbay (Fionnasbhagh)
- Fir Bhrèige
- Flodabay (Fleòideabhagh)
- Flodaigh
- Flodday
- Fuaigh Beag
- Fuaigh Mòr
- Fuday (Fùideigh)

== G ==
- Geocrab (Geòcrab)
- Gighay (Gioghaigh)
- Gravir (Grabhair)
- Great Bernera (Beàrnaraigh Ùig)
- Grimsay (Griomasaigh)
- Grimsay, South East Benbecula (Griomasaigh)

== H ==
- Habost (Tàbost)
- Harris (Na Hearadh)
- Hellisay (Theiliseigh)
- Hushinish (Hùisinis)

== I ==
- Iochdar (An t-Ìochdar)

== K ==
- Kisimul Castle (Caisteal Chiseamail)

== L ==
- Laxdale (Lacasdal)
- Leverburgh (An Tòb)
- Lewis (Leòdhas), Lewis and Harris (Leòdhas agus na Hearadh), Lews Castle (Caisteal Leòdhais)
- Lickisto (Liceasto)
- Lingeidh (Lingeigh)
- Lingerbay (Lingearabhagh)
- Liniclate (Lìonacleit)
- Loch Ròg
- Lochboisdale (Loch Baghasdail)
- Lochmaddy (Loch nam Madadh)

== M ==
- Manish (Mànais)
- Mingulay (Miughalaigh)
- Muldoanich (Maol Dòmhnaich)

== N ==
- Newtonferry (Port nan Long)
- North Uist (Uibhist a Tuath)

== P ==
- Pabbay (Pabaigh)
- Pobull Fhinn

== R ==
- Rèinigeadal
- Rockall (Rocabarraigh), Rockall Bank
- Rodel (Roghadal)
- Ruabhal (Ruaidheabhal)

== S ==
- Sandray (Sanndraigh)
- Scalpay (Sgalpaigh)
- Scarp
- Scolpaig
- Scolpaig Tower (Dùn Scolpaig)
- Sollas (Solas)
- Sound of Barra (Caolas na Barraigh)
- Sound of Harris (Caolas na Hearadh)
- South Uist (Uibhist a Deas)
- St Kilda (Hiort)
- Steinacleit
- Stiomrabhaig
- Stornoway (Steòrnabhagh), Stornoway Airport (Port-Adhair Steòrnabhagh)

== T ==
- Taransay (Tarasaigh)
- Tarbert (An Tairbeart)
- Tigharry (Taigh a' Ghearraidh)

== U ==
- Uineasan
- Uist (Uibhist)

== V ==
- Vacsay (Bhacasaidh)
- Valtos (Bhaltos)
- Vatersay (Bhatarsaigh)

== W ==
- West Loch Tarbert (Loch A Siar)

== See also ==
- List of places in Scotland
- List of islands of Scotland
- List of Outer Hebrides
