= Fuiay =

Island in Scotland

Fùidheigh (Gaelic)

Location
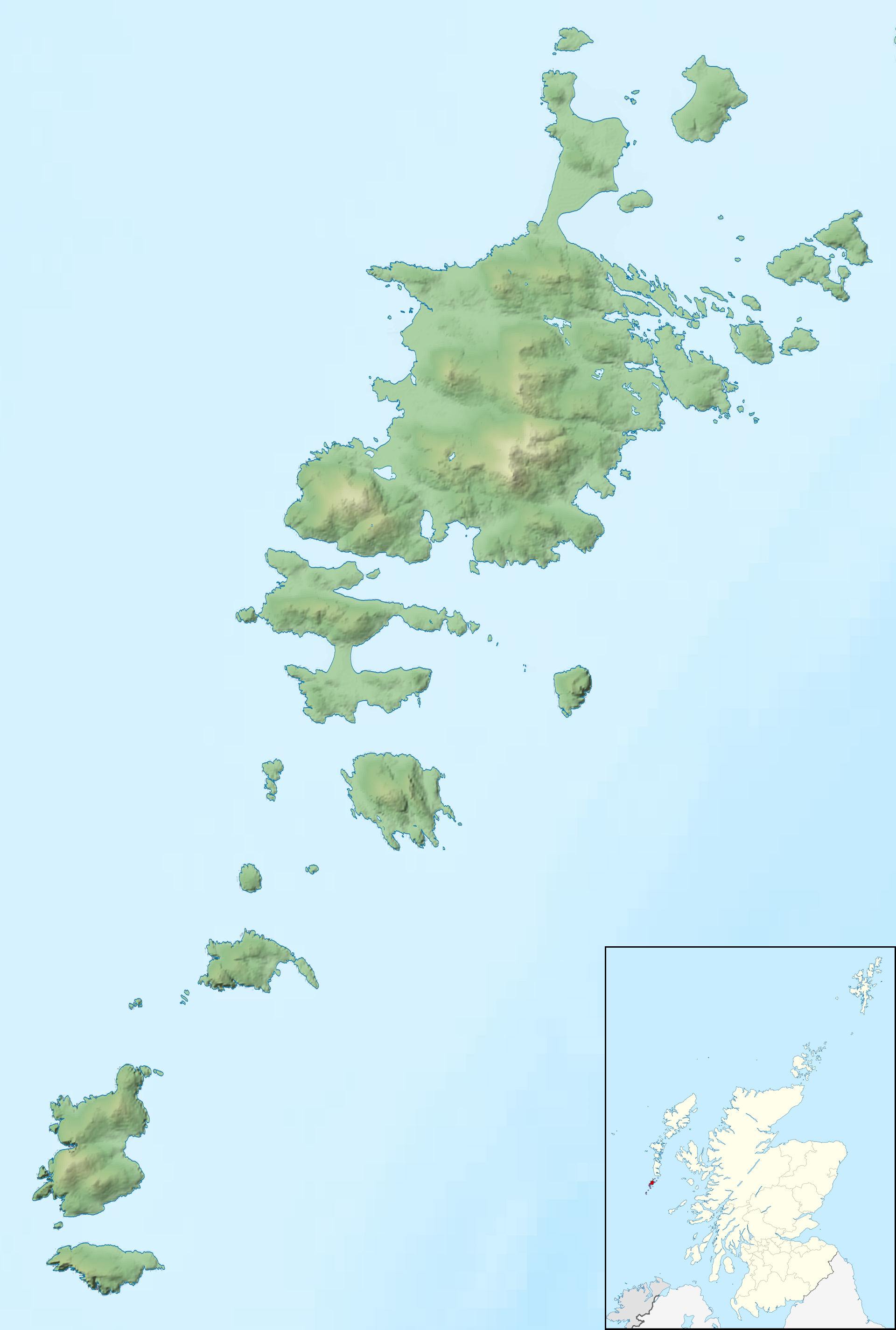
- Fuiay shown next to Barra Fuiay within the Outer Hebrides
- OS grid reference: NF740022
- Coordinates: 57.0°N 7.37°W

Name
- Name meaning: "House island" from Norse

Physical geography
- Island group: Outer Hebrides
- Area: 84 ha (210 acres)
- Area rank: 159=
- Highest elevation: 107 m (351 ft)

Administration
- Council area: Comhairle nan Eilean Siar
- Country: Scotland
- Sovereign state: United Kingdom

Demographics
- Population: 0

Fuiay (Scottish Gaelic: Fùidheigh) is an island in Scotland. It is one of ten islands in the Sound of Barra, a Site of Community Importance for conservation in the Outer Hebrides. Its area is 84 ha and the unnamed highest eminence reaches 107 m. It is located immediately to the west of Flodday and about 1.5 km southwest of Hellisay. Barra lies across the waters of North Bay.

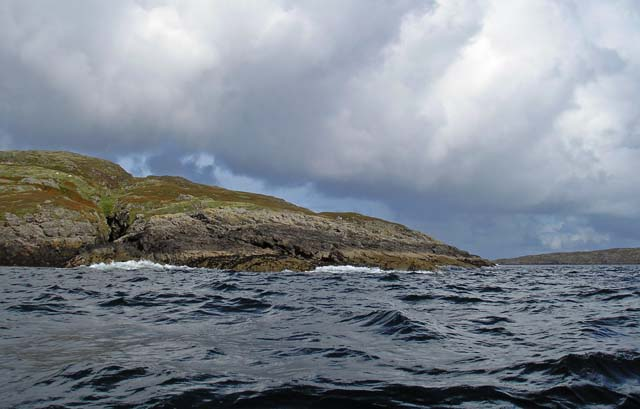
The headland of Rubha na Maighdein, Fuiay, on the left and the island of Flodaigh on the right

The island had six households located along a "street" at Rubh' an Aiseig (English: "ferry headland") in the north west at some point, probably in the early 19th century. It has been uninhabited since about 1850. There is a tidal inlet here that may have been an effective fish-trap.

The name may be from the Norse for "house island" or possibly a mixture of the Gaelic bhuidhe, meaning "yellow" and the Norse øy meaning "island".

Fuiay is one of several uninhabited islands off the northeast coast of Barra and other islands in the vicinity include Orosay, Fuday and Gighay. The sea to the north west is peppered with small islets and skerries but there is an anchorage to the north of Rubh' an Aiseig sheltered by the islets of Sgeirislum to the west and Eilean Sheumais to the east. Garbh Lingeigh is a larger islet further to the north in the Sound of Hellisay.
