= List of sounds of Scotland =

This is a list of the sounds of Scotland. These straits vary in size from substantial sea channels to the tiny Clachan Sound, which is only 21.3 metres (70 ft) wide and spanned by the Clachan Bridge. There are numerous other stretches of open water around the Scottish coasts that could be classified as straits, but which are called by names other than "sound".

== Shetland ==
- Balta Sound on the island of Unst
- Bluemull Sound between Unst and Yell
- Colgrave Sound between Fetlar and Yell
- Easter Sound between Vaila and Whitesness on the West Mainland
- Sound of Papa between Papa Stour and West Mainland
- Uyea Sound between Uyea and Unst
- Vaila Sound separating Vaila from Linga and the bays of Walls
- Wester Sound between Vaila and Burrastow on the West Mainland
- Yell Sound between Yell and Mainland Shetland

== Orkney ==
- Auskerry Sound between Stronsay and Auskerry
- Burra Sound between Hoy and Graemsay
- Calf Sound between Calf of Eday and Eday
- Clestrain Sound between Mainland Orkney and Graemsay
- Eynhallow Sound separating Rousay from Mainland Orkney
- Gairsay Sound between Gairsay and Wyre
- Gutter Sound between Rysa Little and Fara
- Holm Sound between Burray, Lamb Holm and Mainland Orkney
- Hoy Sound between Hoy and Mainland Orkney
- Linga Sound between Linga Holm and Stronsay
- Sanday Sound, between Sanday and Stronsay
- Shapinsay Sound between Shapinsay and Mainland Orkney
- Sound of Hoxa between South Ronaldsay and Flotta
- Switha Sound between Switha and Flotta
- The North Sound between Westray and Sanday
- Water Sound between Burray and South Ronaldsay
- Weddell Sound between Fara and Flotta
- Wyre Sound, between Wyre and Rousay

== Inner Hebrides ==
- Clachan Sound between Seil and mainland Argyll.
- Cuan Sound between Seil and Luing
- Cuillin Sound between Rùm and Skye
- Inner Sound between Raasay and the Applecross peninsula
- Shuna Sound between Luing and Shuna
- Sound of Arisaig between mainland Lochaber the Small Isles
- Sound of Canna between Rùm and Canna
- Sound of Gigha between Gigha and Kintyre
- Sound of Islay between Islay and Jura
- Sound of Iona between Iona and Mull
- Sound of Jura between Jura and Knapdale
- Sound of Luing between Luing and Lunga
- Sound of Mull between Mull and Morvern
- Sound of Raasay between Raasay and Skye
- Sound of Rum between Rùm and Eigg
- Sound of Sleat between Sleat and Knoydart
- Sound of Ulva between Ulva and Mull

== Outer Hebrides ==
- Sound of Barra between Barra and South Uist
- Sound of Berneray between Barra Head and Mingulay
- Sound of Harris between Harris and North Uist
- Sound of Shiant between Lewis and the Shiant Islands
- Sound of Sandray between Sandray and Vatersay
- Soay Sound between Soay Mòr and Harris

== Firth of Clyde ==
- Kilbrannan Sound between Kintyre and Arran
- Sound of Bute between Bute and Arran

== See also ==
- Firths of Scotland - substantial estuaries.
- List of sea lochs in Scotland
- Category:Scottish coast
- Western Ferries who operate a number of vessels named Sound of.... after some of the above locations.
