= Orosay =

Tidal Island by Barra, Scotland

Orasaigh (Gaelic)

Location
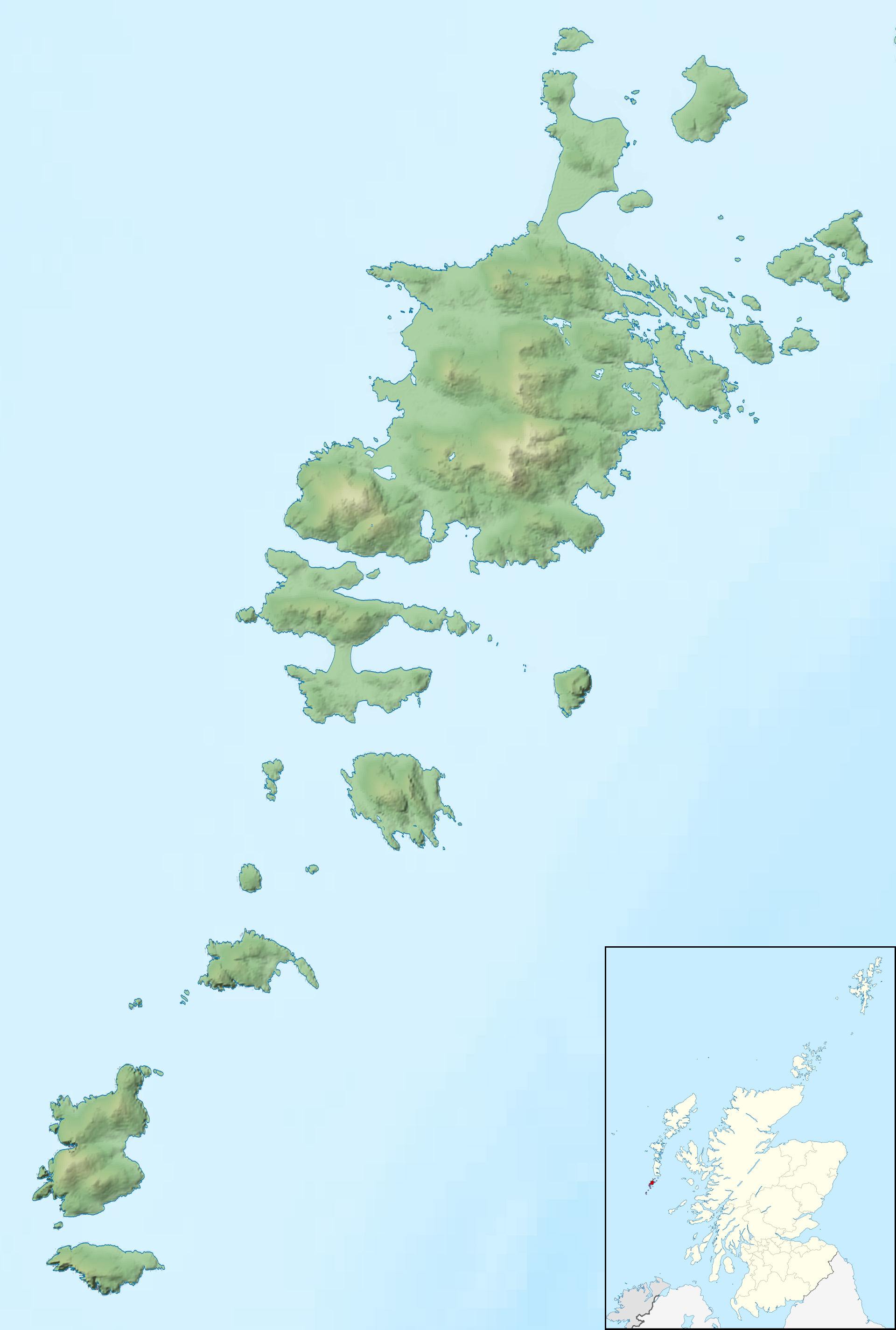
- Orosay shown next to Barra Orosay shown within the Outer Hebrides
- OS grid reference: NF712060
- Coordinates: 57.028056°N 7.420556°W

Name
- Name meaning: "tidal island"
- Old Norse name: Örfirisey

Physical geography
- Island group: Barra
- Area: 38 ha (94 acres)
- Highest elevation: 38 m (125 ft)

Administration
- Council area: Western Isles
- Country: Scotland
- Sovereign state: United Kingdom

Demographics
- Population: Uninhabited

Orosay (Scottish Gaelic: Orasaigh) is a small uninhabited tidal island in the Sound of Barra lying at the north end of Traigh Mhòr, the "big beach" on the north east coast of Barra. It is one of ten islands in the Sound of Barra, a Site of Community Importance for conservation in the Outer Hebrides of Scotland. It is about 30 hectares (74 acres) in extent and the highest point is 38 metres (125 ft).

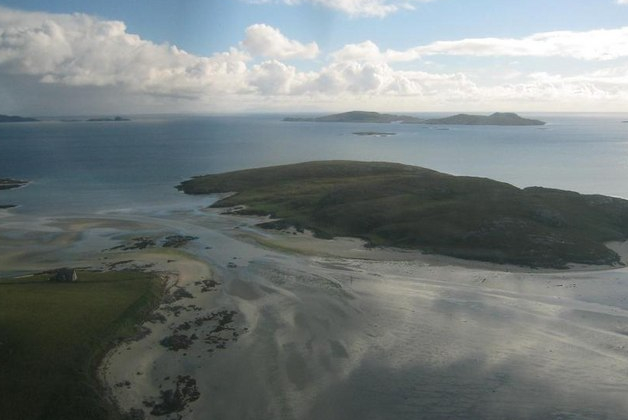
Orosay from the air, with the narrows of Caolas Orasaigh in the foreground and Gighay and Hellisay beyond.

== Geography and etymology ==
Inland, the nearest settlement is Eoligarry, separated from the island by the strait of Caolas Orasaigh (English: "Sound of Orosay"). The smaller beach of Tràigh Cille-bharra ("the beach of the church of Barra") lies to the north. The islands of Fuday, Greanamul, Gighay and Hellisay lie further offshore in the Sound of Barra. The name "Orosay" is a variant of "Oronsay", from the Old Norse for "tidal" or "ebb island", found commonly in the Hebrides. For example, there are two other small Orosay/Orosaighs surrounding Barra alone. One is at grid reference NL665970 at the south eastern approaches to Castle Bay and the second at grid reference NL641971 in Caolas Bhatarsaigh east of the causeway.

== History ==
The writer Compton Mackenzie lived on Barra nearby and is buried at Cille Bharra, opposite the island. There is no record of Orosay itself ever having been permanently inhabited.

== Beach runway ==
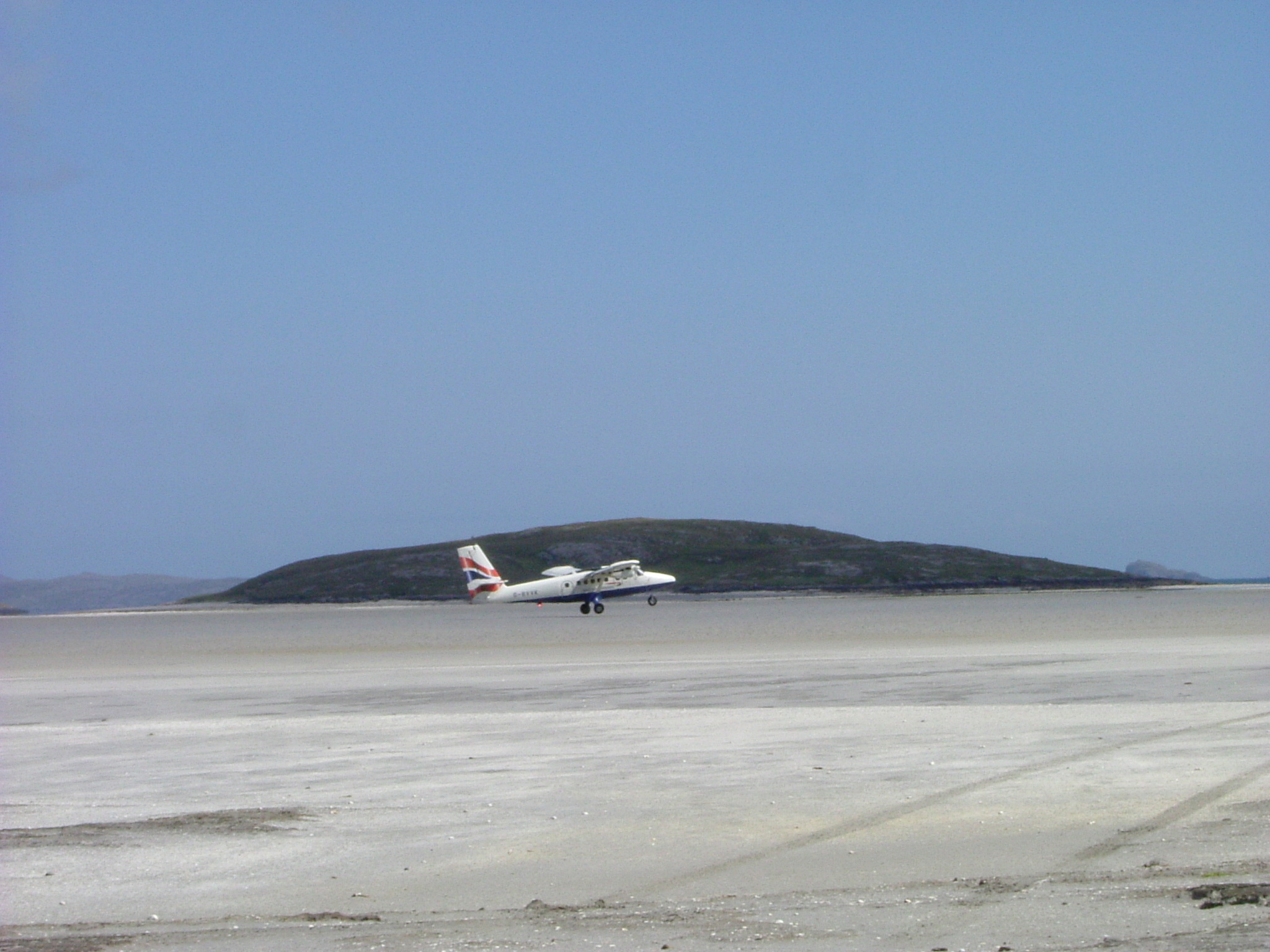
Orosay and the "runway" at Barra airport

Barra's airport uses Traigh Mhòr ("big beach"), also known as Cockle Strand, as a runway. Planes can only land and take off at low tide, and the timetable varies with the tides. Reputedly, this is the only airport in the world to have scheduled flights landing on a beach. The aircraft currently in operation on Barra is the de Havilland Canada DHC-6 Twin Otter, flown by Loganair on services to Glasgow and Benbecula. Traigh Mhòr also provides commercial cockle harvesting.

In the 1970s concern was expressed about the progressive deepening of Caolas Orasaigh as a possible cause of increased ponding of water on the beach runway at low tide. The problem does not, however, appear to have been serious and apparently no action was taken.

== Orosay in literature ==
Julian Barnes's short story "Marriage Lines" (collected in Pulse (2011)) is set entirely on Orosay.

== See also ==
- List of the islands of the Sound of Barra
- List of Outer Hebrides
