= List of islands called Linga =

There are several islands called Linga, or similar names, in Scotland. "Linga", in the Northern Isles, and sometimes "Lingay" and "Lingeigh" in the Hebrides, is a common name for an island, and occurs most frequently in Shetland. It is derived from the old Norse lyngey meaning 'heather island'. The Scottish Gaelic equivalent is Eilean Fraoch or Fraoch Eilean.

== Shetland ==
- Linga, Bluemull Sound (near Gutcher and Yell)
- Linga, Busta Voe
- Linga, Scalloway Islands
  - Hogg of Linga
- Linga, Vaila Sound
- Linga (near Vementry)
- Linga, Yell Sound
  - Linga Skerries
- Off Whalsay
  - West Linga
    - Calf of Linga, West Linga
    - Little Linga
      - Calf of Little Linga
  - East Linga
    - Calf of Linga, East Linga
- Linga Skerries in South Nesting Bay off Mainland, Shetland
- Urie Lingey off Fetlar

== Orkney ==
- Off Stronsay
  - Linga Holm (off St Catherine's Bay)
  - Little Linga, Stronsay (off Links Ness)
- Off Auskerry
  - Linga Skerries

== Hebrides ==
- Lingay, Fiaray north of Barra and west of Eriskay
- Lingay, Killegray south east of Killegray in the Sound of Harris
- Lingeigh in the Bishop's Isles, south of Barra
- Lingay, Wiay off Benbecula
- Langay or Langaigh, an islet north of Lingay, Killegray and east of Killegray in the Sound of Harris
- Lingay Fhada north of Fuiay and Barra, and south west of Hellisay
- Garbh Lingay also north of Fuiay and Barra, and south west of Hellisay
- Lingeam (from Norse "Lyng Holm")
- Lingeigh, North Uist south east of Boreray

== Similar names ==
There are also a number of Scottish islands with similar names, including:

- Langa, Shetland, off Hildasay, Shetland
- Longa, near Gairloch in Wester Ross
- Longa Skerry, off West Linga, Shetland
- Longay off Skye
- Luing in the Slate Islands
- Luinn, (the Gaelic for Luing)
- Lunga, Treshnish Isles off Mull
- Lunga, Firth of Lorn in the Slate Islands, Argyll
- Lunna Holm off Yell, Shetland

== See also ==
- Linga (disambiguation)
- List of islands in Scotland
