= Cuillin Sound =

Inlet in the Inner Hebrides, Scotland

Coordinates: 57.0863°N 6.222°W

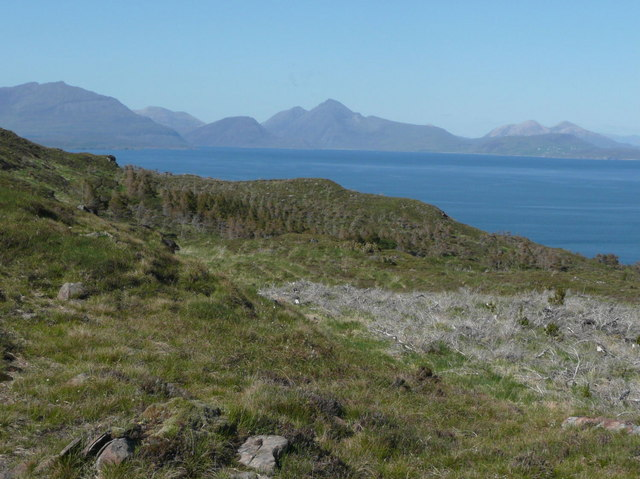
The Cuillin Sound and Skye, as seen from East Rùm

Cuillin Sound is a sound (inlet) that separates the island of Skye from the islands of Rùm and Canna, all of which are located in Scotland's Inner Hebrides.

The sound gives its name to the H.M.S. Cuillin Sound, a British repair ship that was allocated to the British Pacific Fleet during World War II.

== See also ==
- Sounds of Scotland
