= Fiaraidh =

One of ten islands in the Sound of Barra in Scotland

Fiaraigh (Gaelic)
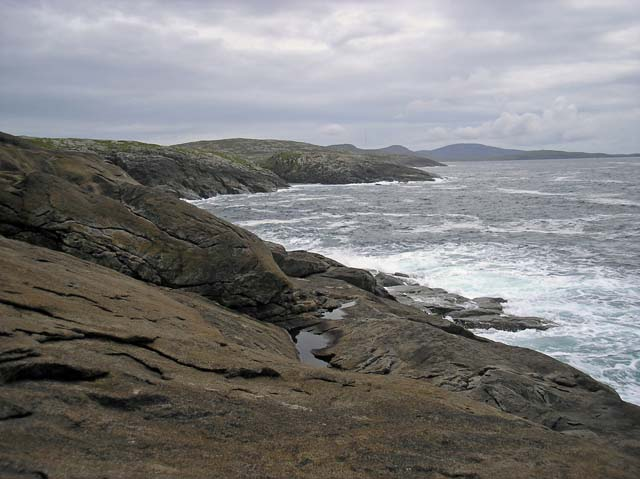
- Western coastline of Fiaraigh

Location
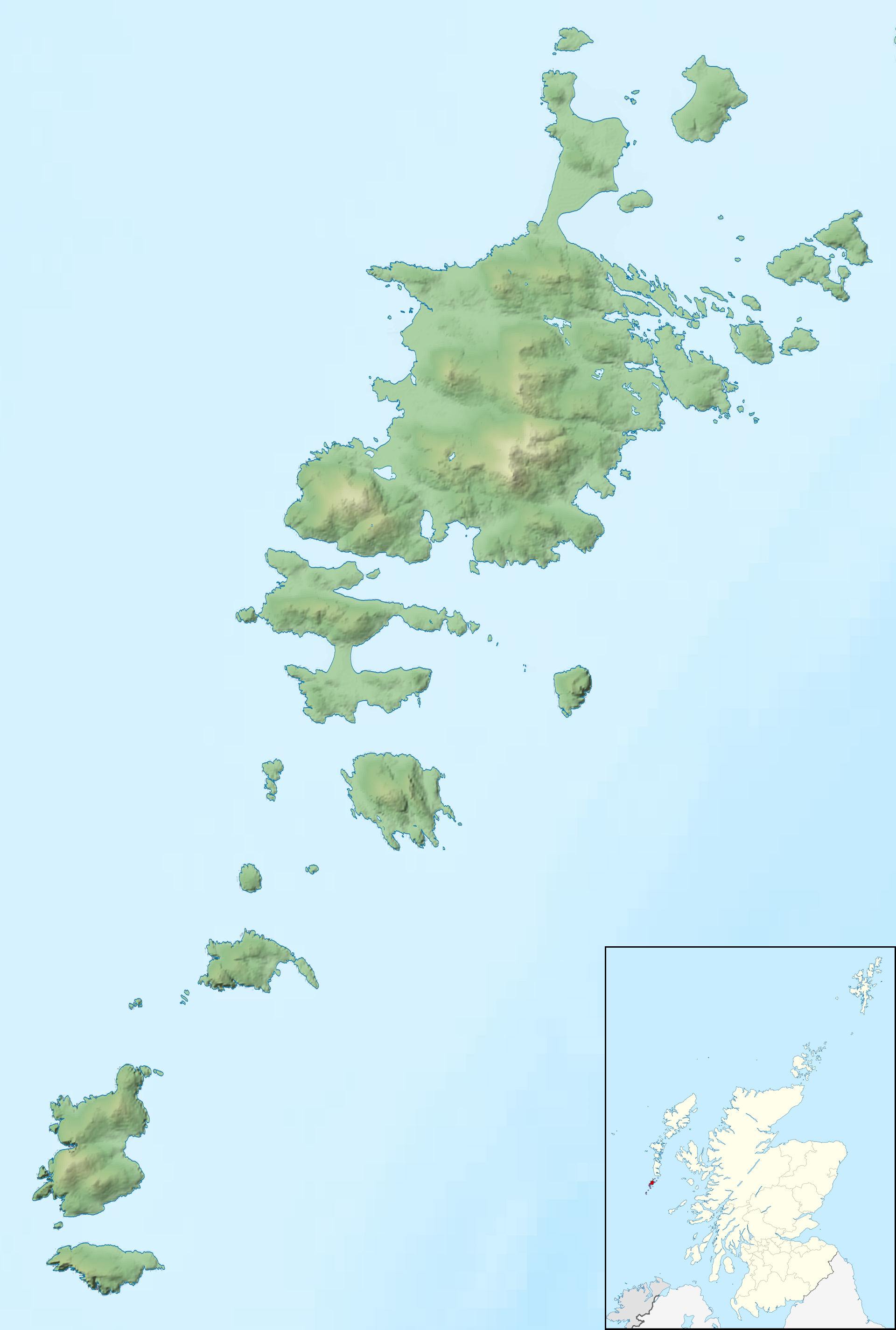
- Fiaraidh shown next to Barra Fiaraidh shown within the Outer Hebrides
- OS grid reference: NF702104
- Coordinates: 57.07°N 7.44°W

Name
- Name meaning: 'grass' or 'pasture' island

Physical geography
- Island group: Uist and Barra
- Area: 41 hectares (0.16 sq mi)
- Area rank: 217=
- Highest elevation: 30 metres (98 ft)

Administration
- Council area: Outer Hebrides
- Country: Scotland
- Sovereign state: United Kingdom

Demographics
- Population: 0

Fiaraidh (OS; formerly anglicised as Fiaray; Scottish Gaelic: Fiaraigh) is one of ten islands in the Sound of Barra, a Site of Community Importance for conservation in the Outer Hebrides. It is 41 ha in size, and 30 metres at its highest point. It is relatively flat and featureless, and is used as a staging post by barnacle geese. The geology is Archaean gneiss.

There are two lochans or ponds, on the island, and it is surrounded by a large drying reef, which was said to be the abode of a fairy woman.

Nearby Lingay is the subject of some folklore.
