= Traigh Mhòr =

Beach and airstrip in Barra, Outer Hebrides

Coordinates: 57°1′28″N 7°26′4″W

The Tràigh Mhòr, literally "Big Beach" in Scottish Gaelic, is a large expanse of sand forming a magnificent white beach at the northern end of the island of Barra in the Outer Hebrides of Scotland, in the village of Ardmhor extending to the village of Eoligarry. The beach is made up of hard compacted sand. The tidal islet of Orosay lies at the north end of the beach.

== Airport ==
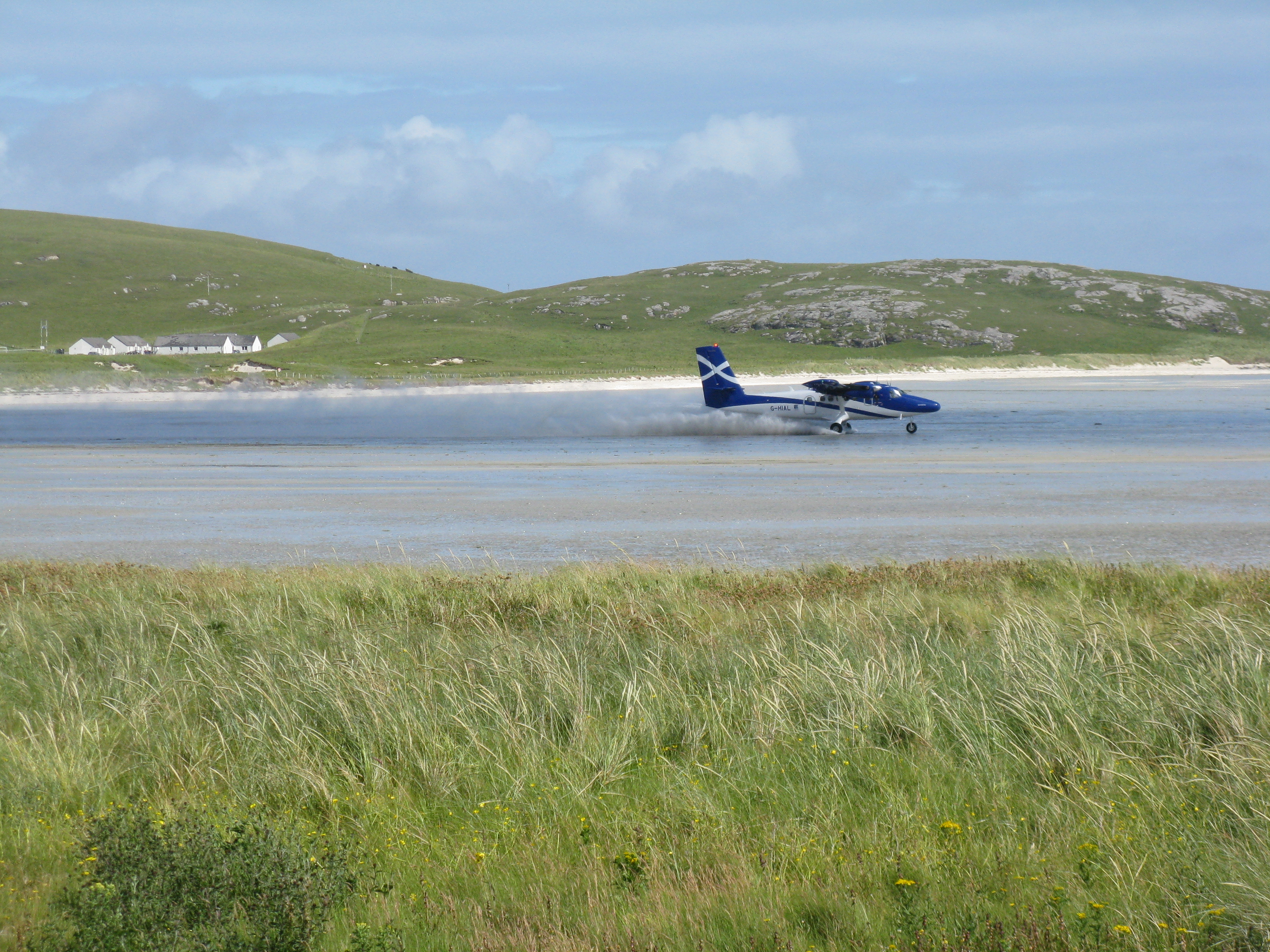
A Twin Otter taking off from Traigh Mhòr

In 1933 when a site was sought for Barra Airport, John MacPherson, the local postmaster (otherwise known as 'The Coddy') suggested that the beach, with its hard compact sand, be used for the runways. It is still in use, and is the only runway in the world washed twice a day by the tide. There are three runways, to allow for different wind directions. Three large visible markers mark the runways. When the windsock flies to show that a plane arrival is imminent, the area is out of bounds to people on the beach.

== Cockling ==
The Tràigh Mhòr is also popular with cockle pickers - the source of its other well known name: 'The Cockle Strand'. Other shellfish such as razorfish and winkles are also collected. Cockle pickers use rakes to rake the sand in search of the cockles. Many of the islanders collect cockles and sell them to a local company, 'Barratlantic', which has a fish factory on Barra at 'Aird Mhithinis', or in English orthography 'Ardveenish'. Shellfish from the beach and from around the waters of Barra are mostly exported to Europe.
