= Clach an Trushal =

Standing stone in Outer Hebrides, Scotland

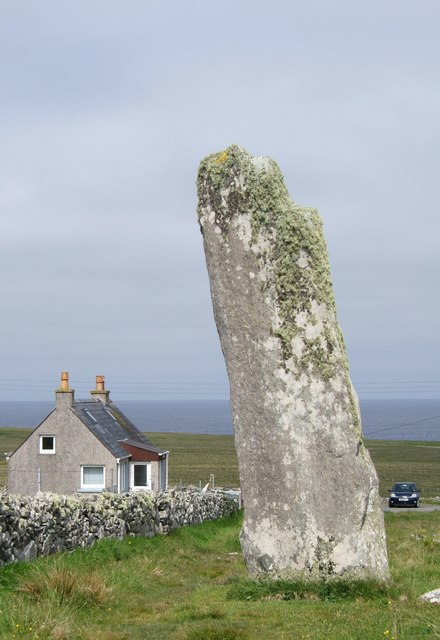
- The menhir in 2007
- Interactive map of Clach an Trushal
- 58°23′36″N 6°29′35″W
- Type: Menhir
- Location: Scotland, United Kingdom

History
- Built: c. 3000 BC

Site notes
- Material: Stone
- Height: 5.8 m (19 ft)
- Width: 1.83 m (6 ft 0 in)

Clach an Trushal (Scottish Gaelic: Clach an Truiseil, Scottish Gaelic pronunciation: [kʰl̪ˠax ən̪ˠ ˈt̪ʰɾuʃal], translated to English "Stone of Compassion") is said to be the tallest standing stone in Scotland. Above ground it stands approximately 5.8 metres (19 feet 0 inches) tall, is 1.83 m (6 ft 0 in) wide and at its thickest point is 1.5 m (4 ft 11 in) thick, with a girth at its base of 4.75 m (15 ft 7 in). The stone is in the village of Ballantrushal on the west side of Lewis. Local legend says that it marks the site of a great battle, the last to be fought between the feuding clans of the Macaulays and Morrisons. However it is actually the solitary upright stone remaining from a stone circle built about 5,000 years ago. It occupied a place within the circle, although its placement was not central. The second last standing stone was removed in 1914, and used as a lintel.

From the base the stone circle at Steinacleit archaeological site is clearly visible to the north east. The Callanish standing stones are 20 miles (30 kilometres) southwest.
