= Walls, Shetland =

Coordinates: 60.229°N 1.565°W

Walls: Waas
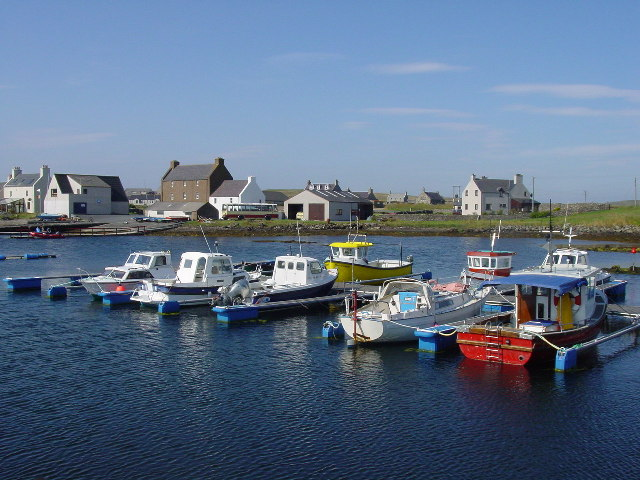
- Boats at Walls on a warm summer afternoon

- Location within Scotland
- OS grid reference: HU240494
- Civil parish: Walls and Sandness
- Council area: Shetland Islands
- Lieutenancy area: Shetland
- Country: Scotland
- Sovereign state: United Kingdom
- Post town: SHETLAND
- Postcode district: ZE2
- Dialling code: (01595) 809xxx
- Police: Scotland
- Fire: Scottish
- Ambulance: Scottish
- UK Parliament: Orkney and Shetland
- Scottish Parliament: Shetland

Walls, spelled locally Waas (Shaetlan pronunciation: [waᶦz] WAHZ), is a settlement on the south side of West Mainland, Shetland Islands in Scotland. The settlement is at the head of Vaila Sound and sheltered even from southerly storms by the islands of Linga and Vaila. Walls is within the parish of Walls and Sandness which includes the islands of Foula, Papa Stour, Vaila and Linga.

== Etymology ==
The name is from the Old Norse: Vágar meaning voes or bays. This became Waas in the Shetlandic dialect - but how this then came to be spelled "Walls" is not certain. MacBain quotes F. W. L. Thomas: "How, I ask, could vágr come to be represented by wall? Whence came the ll? Was it that Scottish immigrants finding the sound of vá represented it in writing by 'wall,' the ll at first being silent?"

One form of the area's old name was Vágarland, hence the pen name of local poet 'Vagaland'.

== History ==
A pier was built at Walls in the 18th century, and from 1838, it was a centre for fish curing. The Six Inch Second Edition Map of Walls illustrates this activity, while the statistics recorded for Vaila Sound in the Annual Reports of the Fishery Board illustrate how fishing was already declining before the First World War.

Fishery Statistics

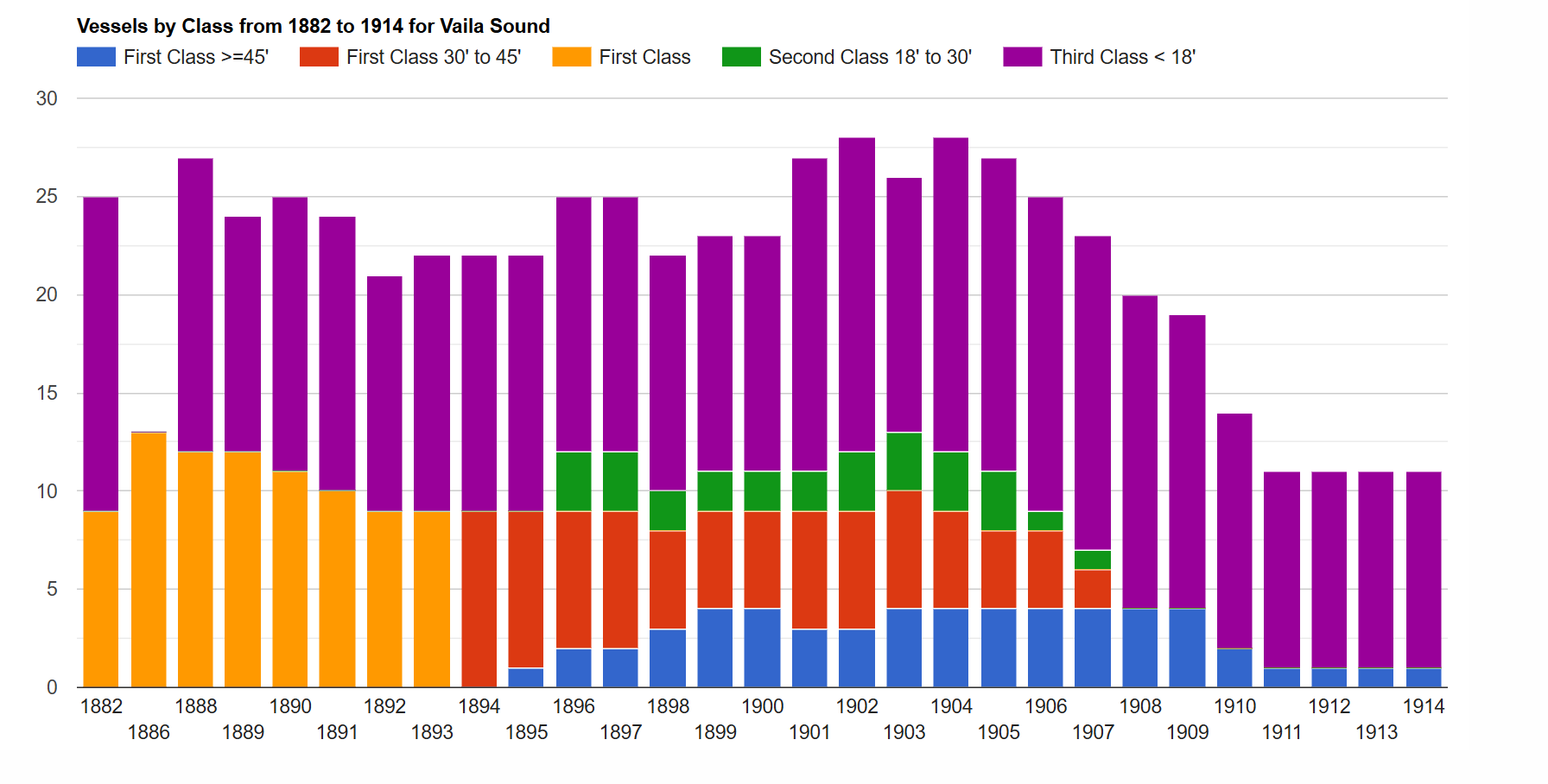
Vessels by class

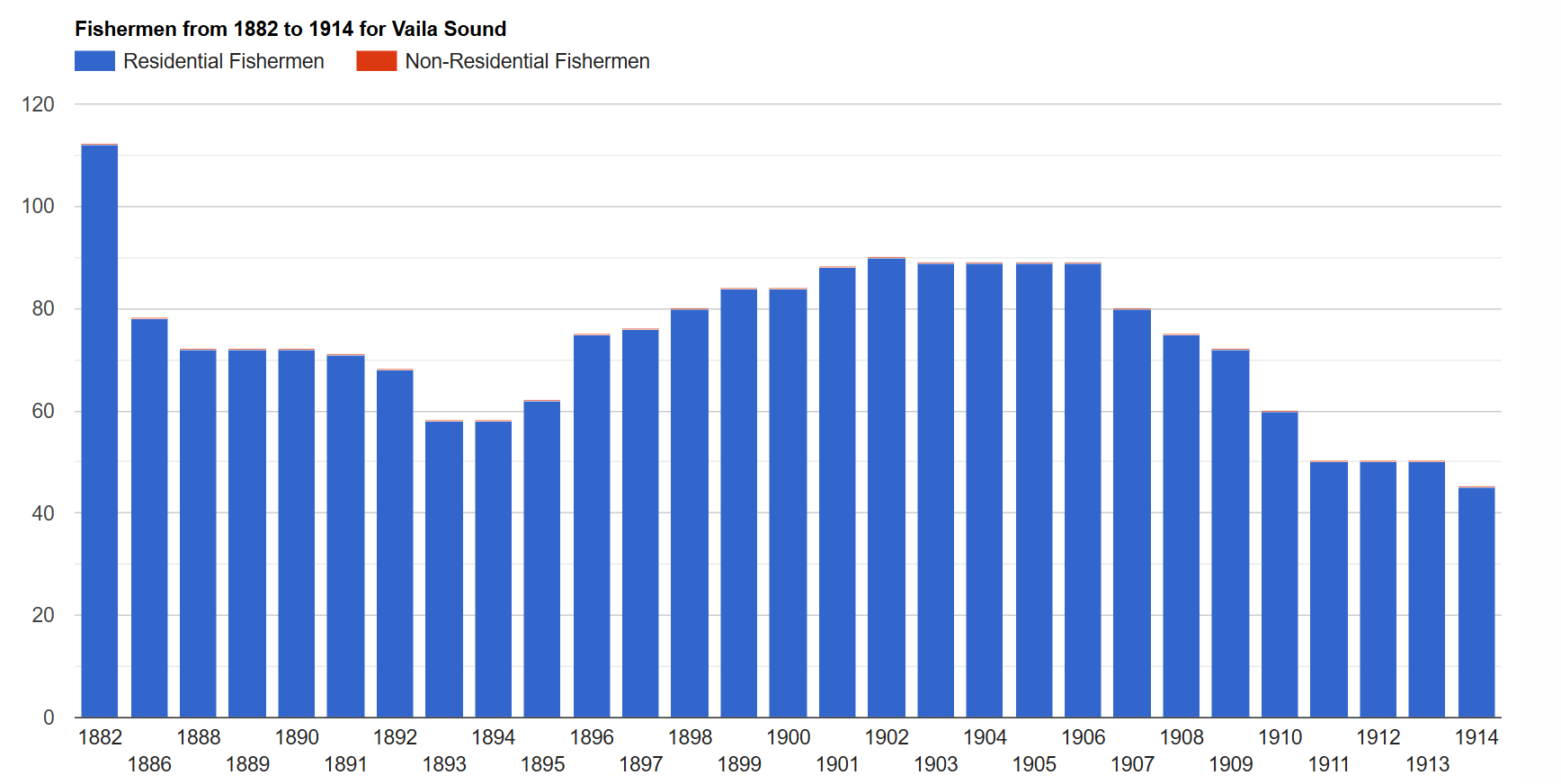
Fishermen

Walls itself is a quieter place than once it was. The large houses of Bayhall, now converted into flats, and Voe House are signs of past wealth, as are the three churches visible around the head of the sound. Two are still in use, while the third bears a sign showing its later conversion to a bakery.

On June 25, 1958, the Estonian fisherman Erich Teayn (a.k.a. Erik Klaub) escaped from the Soviet ship Ukrania in Walls by commandeering a motorboat. He was pursued across the countryside by 30 Soviet crewmen, but he managed to evade capture and was eventually granted asylum by the British government.

Walls was the childhood home of two poets, Vagaland (Thomas Alexander Robertson, 1909–1973) and Christine De Luca (born 1947). In 1884 it was the birthplace of both Peter Fraser (1884–1966), musician and founder member of the Shetland Fiddlers' Society, and William Moffatt, author.

== Community ==
A little to the east of the centre of the village is the marina, making this a popular base for leisure sailors. The fishing vessels that are still based in Walls tend to use the pier a few hundred yards along the west side of Vaila Sound. This is also the terminus for the ferry service to the island of Foula, which lies 20 miles (32 kilometres) west, out into the Atlantic.

Today it is home to the Shetland dialect children's writer Iris Sandison, also secretary to the local history group.

Walls has long been noted for its annual agricultural show. A short film of 'da Waas Show' in the early 1960s, by the late Albert Hunter, is available at the link below.

== See also ==
- List of listed buildings in Walls and Sandness, Shetland Islands
- Vágar and Vágur in the Faroe Islands
- South Walls, Hoy, Orkney
