= Linga, Vaila Sound =

One of the Shetland Islands

Coordinates: 60°12′55″N 1°34′11″W

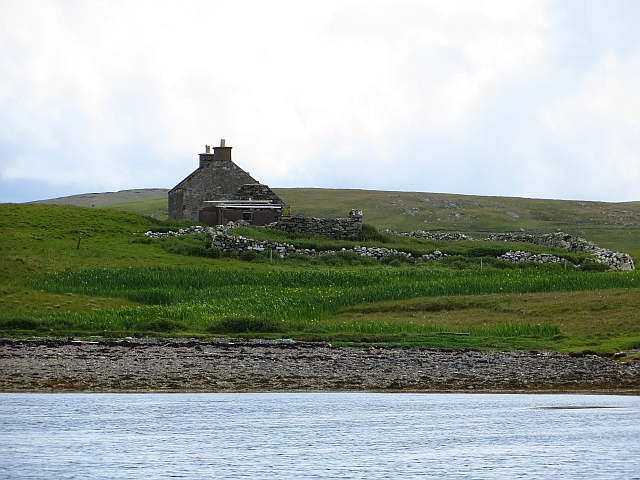
Linga, viewed from the northwest

Linga is one of the Shetland Islands, near Vaila and Walls on Mainland, Shetland. Its highest elevation is 28 metres (91 ft).

== Geography and geology ==
Linga is made up of sandstone and is subjected to ancient glacial erosion.

Linga is to the north east of the island of Vaila, in Vaila Sound surrounded by Mainland, Shetland on three sides. The Holm of Breibister is to the west, the Baa of Linga to the south (baa is a Shetland word for a sunken rock) and the village of Walls is in the North, on the mainland. The surface area is about 65 acres (20 hectares) and there are two derelict cottages on Linga.

In 2011, the local council granted planning permission to an oil industry engineer to develop the island, but by 2018, these plans had not come to fruition. In 2014 and 2018, it was reported that the island was put up for sale for £250,000.

== History ==
In 2018, it was reported that nobody had lived on Linga since 1934. There were two inhabitants in 1931, thirteen in 1881, and nine in 1841.

A dead killer whale was found on a beach on Linga in 2017.

== See also ==
- List of islands called Linga
