= Sound of Barra =

Large ocean inlet or sound in Scotland

Coordinates: 57.06°N 7.36°W

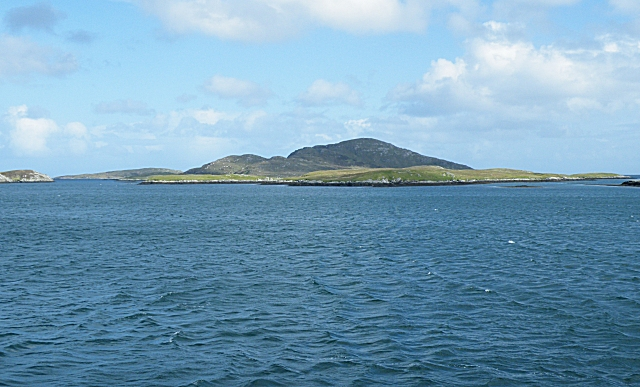
Islands in the Sound of Barra.

Admiralty Chart of the Sound of Barra.

The Sound of Barra is a large ocean inlet or sound situated to the north of the isle of Barra and to the south of South Uist in the Outer Hebrides in Scotland. Since 2014 it has been designated as a Special Area of Conservation (SAC). The Sound of Barra is composed of 98.91% marine and inlet areas, 1.07% mudflats and other semi-submerged areas and 0.02% sea cliffs and islets. There are ten islands in the sound, with only Eriskay still being inhabited:

- Calvay
- Eriskay
- Fiaraidh
- Flodday
- Fuday
- Fuiay
- Gighay
- Hellisay
- Lingay
- Orosay

There is a ferry service across the sound from Ardmore (Scottish Gaelic: Aird Mhòr) on Barra to Ceann a' Ghàraidh on the island of Eriskay.

In 2000 it was proposed that the Sound of Barra should become a SAC. A 12-week consultation process was undertaken by Scottish Natural Heritage (SNH) on behalf of the Scottish Government in the autumn of 2011 with two public meetings held in Castlebay on Barra and on Eriskay as well as inviting submissions by letter and e-mail. SAC status was confirmed on 3 December 2014. The primary reasons for its status as a SAC are the benefits to marine conservation of its sandbanks and reefs with their diverse flora and including maerl and other red algae, kelp communities and fauna such as barnacles and mussels and the presence of harbour seals also being a qualifying feature.

== See also ==
- Sounds of Scotland
