= Vaila =

Island south of the Westland peninsula in Shetland, Scotland

Location
- Location within Shetland
- OS grid reference: HU213462
- Coordinates: 60.20°N 1.58°W

Name
- Old Norse name: Valey

Physical geography
- Island group: Shetland
- Area: 327 hectares (1.26 sq mi)
- Area rank: 82
- Highest elevation: 95 metres (312 ft)

Administration
- Council area: Shetland Islands
- Country: Scotland
- Sovereign state: United Kingdom

Demographics
- Population: 3
- Population rank: 85=
- Population density: 0.9 people/km^{2}

Vaila (Old Norse: "Valey") is an island in Shetland, Scotland, lying south of the Westland peninsula of the Shetland Mainland. It has an area of 327 hectares (810 acres), and is 95 metres (312 ft) at its highest point.

Vaila is home to an organic sheep farm and is also known for its mountain hares.

From 1993, the island was owned by Richard Rowland and his wife, Dorota Rychli. The couple sold it to an undisclosed buyer in 2023.

== History ==
The island has been inhabited for thousands of years, and Neolithic and Bronze Age remains have been found there.

Other remains on the island include Mucklaberry Castle tower, which was restored in the 1890s.

In 1490, the Ciske family's estates were divided and Vaila and Foula became the property of Alv Knutsson. However, the Ciskes were Norwegian, and as Scotland had annexed Shetland a few decades before, there were confusing and conflicting claims of ownership.

In the 17th century Martin Martin recorded an unusual folk tale:

The inhabitants of the isle Vaila say that no cat will live in it, and if any cat be brought to it, they will rather venture to sea, than stay in the isle. They say that a cat was seen upon the isle about fifty years ago; but how it came there was unknown. They observed about the same time, how the proprietor was in great torment, and as they supposed by witchcraft, of which they say he then died. There is no account that any cat has been seen in the isle ever since that gentleman’s death except when they were carried to it, for making the above-mentioned experiment.

In 1837, Arthur Anderson, the co-founder of P&O, chose the island as the base for his Shetland Fishery Company. This helped end landlords' dominance of the Shetland fishing industry. The journalist John Sands lived on Vaila for a while during the late 19th century.

Vaila Hall, was built in the 1890s, by Herbert Anderton, a Yorkshire mill owner. It is considered to be one of the finest mansions in all of Shetland. It incorporates an older laird's house, built by James Mitchell in 1696. Stone and labour were brought in from England, and ornamentation from even further away: for example, it is thought that the stone griffins may come from Germany.

In 1993, the Andertons sold the island to a solicitor, Richard Rowland, and his Polish wife, Dorota Rychlik. In June 2022, the couple put the island on the market for offers over £1.75 million. It was purchased by an undisclosed buyer early in 2023.

== Geography and geology ==
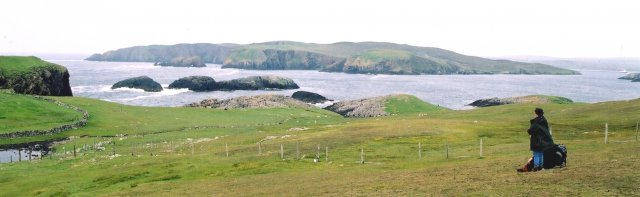
Muckle Flaes and Vaila from Culswick, Mainland

The geology consists of fine dark grey sandstone of the type found in nearby Walls, which was formed 400 million years ago, and subjected to glacial processes. There is some Sandsting granite in the south east by Gaada Stacks.

There are five burns, and four ponds on the island, meaning that it is fairly well watered.

The south end is higher and dominated by Ward Hill (a common name in the Northern Isles), which is divided into West Ward (81 metres (266 feet)), Mid Ward and East Ward (95 metres (312 feet)).

There are several caves in the south and west, and natural arches on the east and west coasts.

To the north west is Wester Sound, and Easter Sound to the East. Vaila Sound is to the north, and contains one of the many Shetland islands called Linga.

== See also ==
- List of islands of Scotland
- List of Shetland islands
