= Steinacleit =

Archaeological site in Scotland

- The cairn in 2006

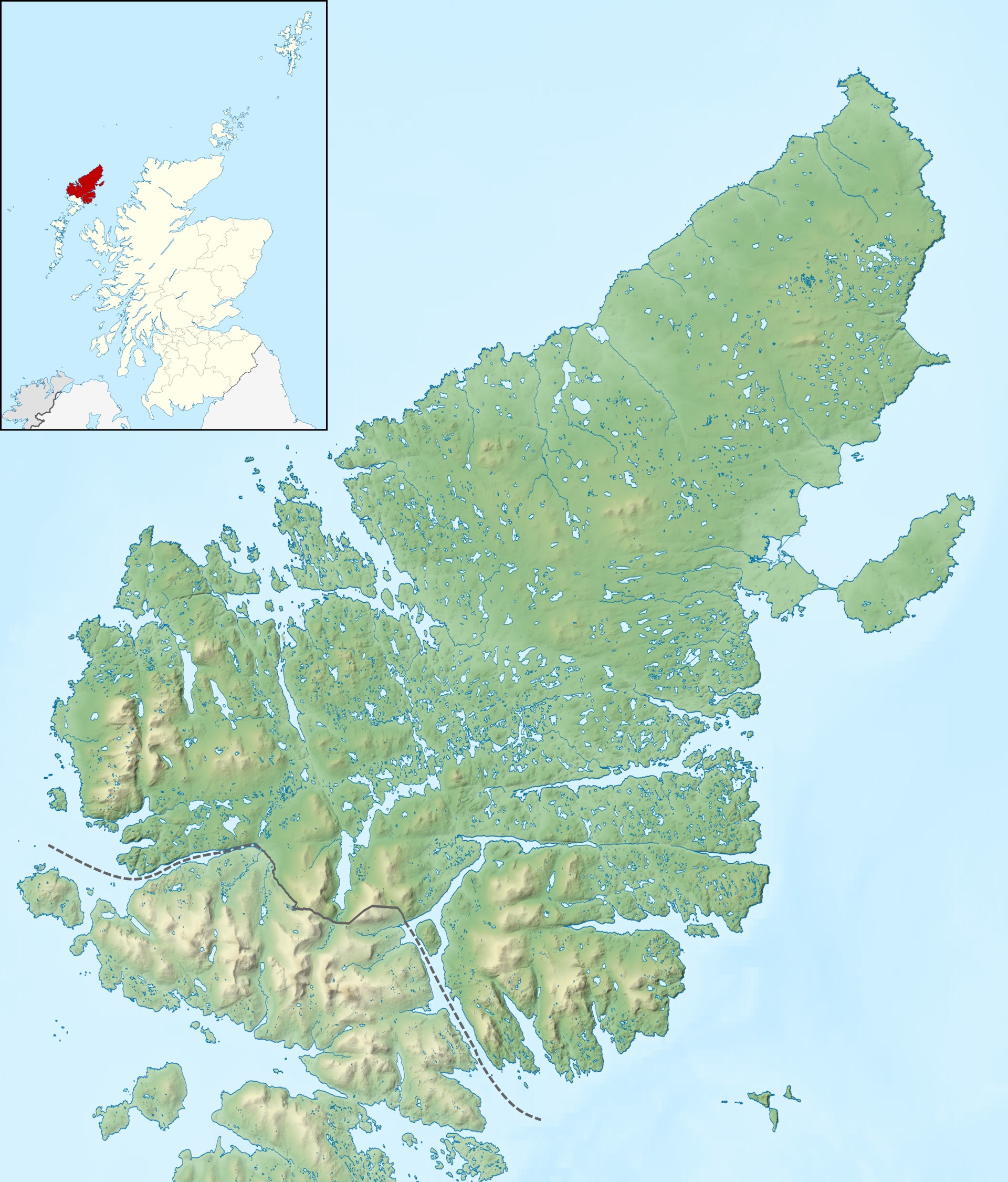
- Location on Lewis
- 58°23′50″N 6°27′27″W
- Type: Chambered cairn
- Location: Scotland, United Kingdom

History
- Built: c. 2000 BC

Site notes
- Material: Stone
- Diameter: 15 m (49 ft)

Steinacleit is a prehistoric archaeological site on the west coast of Lewis in the Outer Hebrides of Scotland.

The site consists of an array of boulders that mark what is left of a chambered cairn, and possibly demarcate a huge hall overlaying the site. There are 10 large stone slabs surrounding the central mound. Folk legend of the Outer Hebrides states there was probably a battlefield nearby. The site is 15 metres (50 feet) in diameter and oval in shape. The age of the site is debatable and according to different sources ranges from 1800–1500 BC or 3000–1500 BC.

The standing stone Clach an Trushal is visible to the south west from the stone circle.
