= Lingay, Fiaray =

Uninhabited island in Scotland

Lingay
Lingeigh (Gaelic)

Location
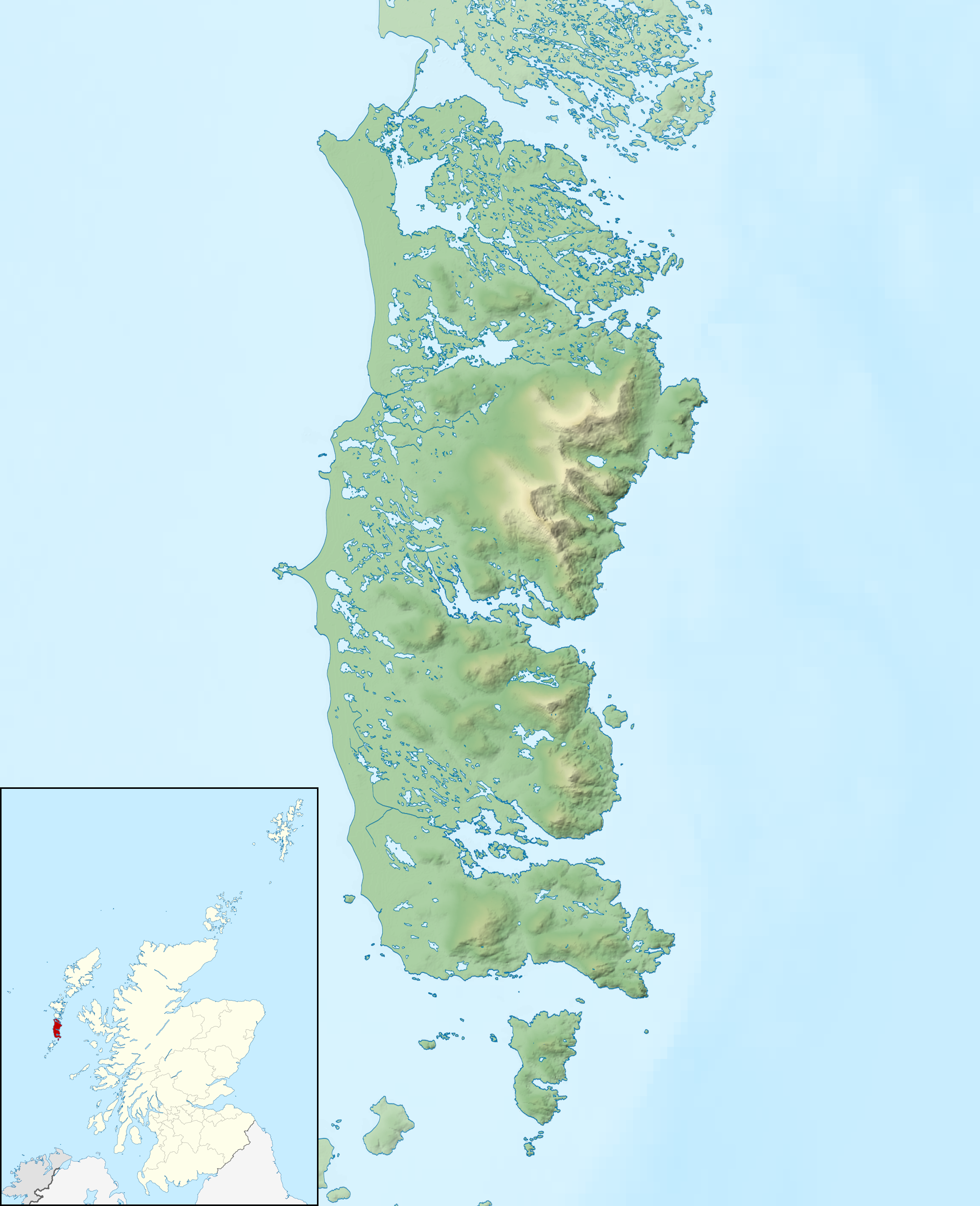
- Lingay shown next to South Uist Lingay shown within the Outer Hebrides
- OS grid reference: NF750115
- Coordinates: 57.08°N 7.36°W

Name
- Name meaning: heather island

Physical geography
- Island group: Uist and Barra
- Area: ha
- Highest elevation: 51 m (167 ft)

Administration
- Council area: Outer Hebrides
- Country: Scotland
- Sovereign state: United Kingdom

Demographics
- Population: 0

Lingay is an uninhabited island in Scotland, one of ten islands in the Sound of Barra, a Site of Community Importance for conservation in the Western Isles. It lies between South Uist, Eriskay, Fuday and Fiaraidh, once anglicized as Fiaray. Its maximum height is 51 metres.
