= Calvay =

Island in Scotland

Calbhaigh (Gaelic)
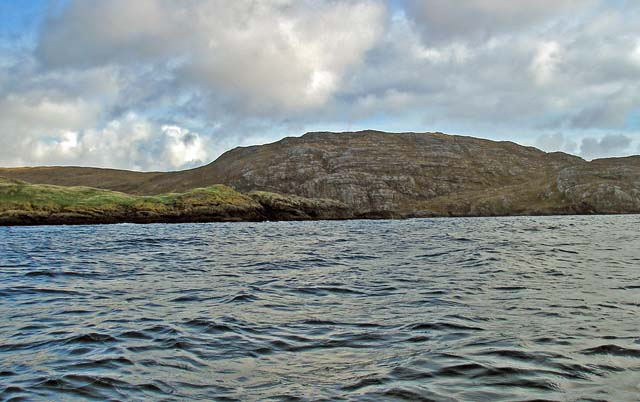

Location
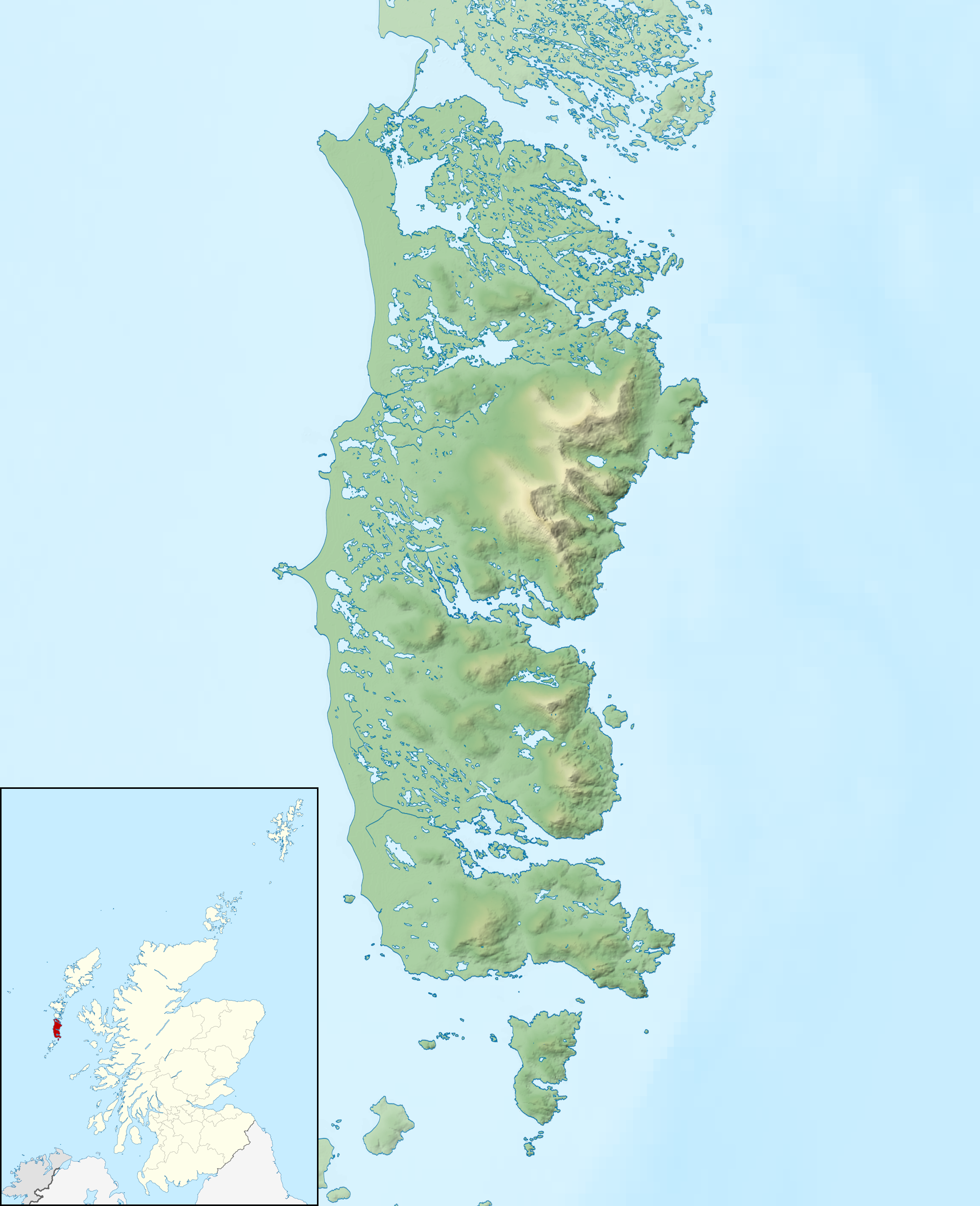
- Calvay shown next to South Uist Eriskay shown within the Outer Hebrides
- OS grid reference: NF810128
- Coordinates: 57.095°N 7.270°W

Name
- Name meaning: Calf Isle

Physical geography
- Island group: Uist and Barra
- Area: 31 ha (1/8 sq mi)

Administration
- Council area: Comhairle nan Eilean Siar
- Country: Scotland
- Sovereign state: United Kingdom

Demographics
- Population: 0

Calvay (Scottish Gaelic: Calbhaigh) is a currently uninhabited island situated in the Sound of Eriskay in the Outer Hebrides, at grid reference NF810126. It is one of ten islands in the Sound of Barra, a Site of Community Importance for conservation.

It was often quoted that the ship SS Politician ran aground at Calvay with a cargo of whisky in 1941 and inadvertently provided the inspiration for Compton MacKenzie's 1947 novel Whisky Galore. However, this is untrue, the ship ran aground on Eriskay.
