= Flodaigh =

Tidal island in the Outer Hebrides, Scotland

Flodaigh (Gaelic)
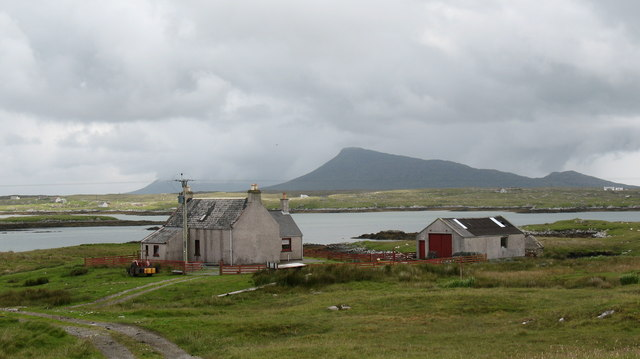
- Flodaigh with Eaval on North Uist behind

Location
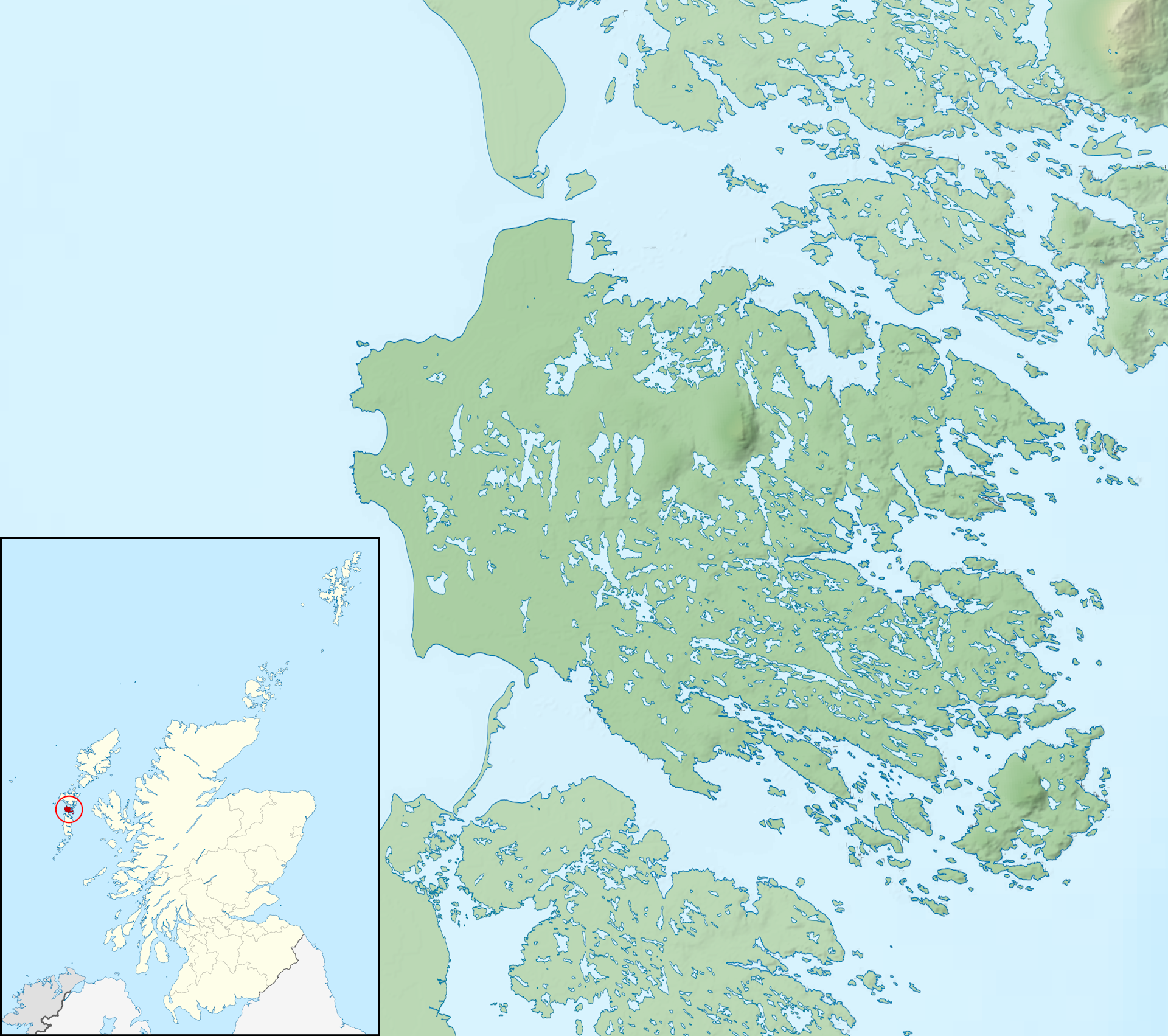
- Flodaigh shown next to Benbecula Flodaigh shown within the Outer Hebrides
- OS grid reference: NF846553
- Coordinates: 57.48°N 7.26°W

Name
- Name meaning: "Float island", from Norse

Physical geography
- Island group: Uists and Barra
- Area: 145 hectares (360 acres)
- Area rank: 124=
- Highest elevation: 20 m (66 ft)

Administration
- Council area: Na h-Eileanan Siar
- Country: Scotland
- Sovereign state: United Kingdom

Demographics
- Population: 7
- Population rank: 82=
- Population density: 2.7 people/km^{2}

Flodaigh is a tidal island lying to the north of Benbecula and south of Grimsay in the Outer Hebrides, Scotland. It is connected to Benbecula by a causeway.

The island is 145 hectares in extent and in 2001 had a population of 11, seven in 2011, and four in 2022. The census refers to the island by its anglicised name of "Flodda".
