= Flodday (Sound of Barra) =

Island in the Outer Hebrides, Scotland

Flodaigh (Gaelic)

Location
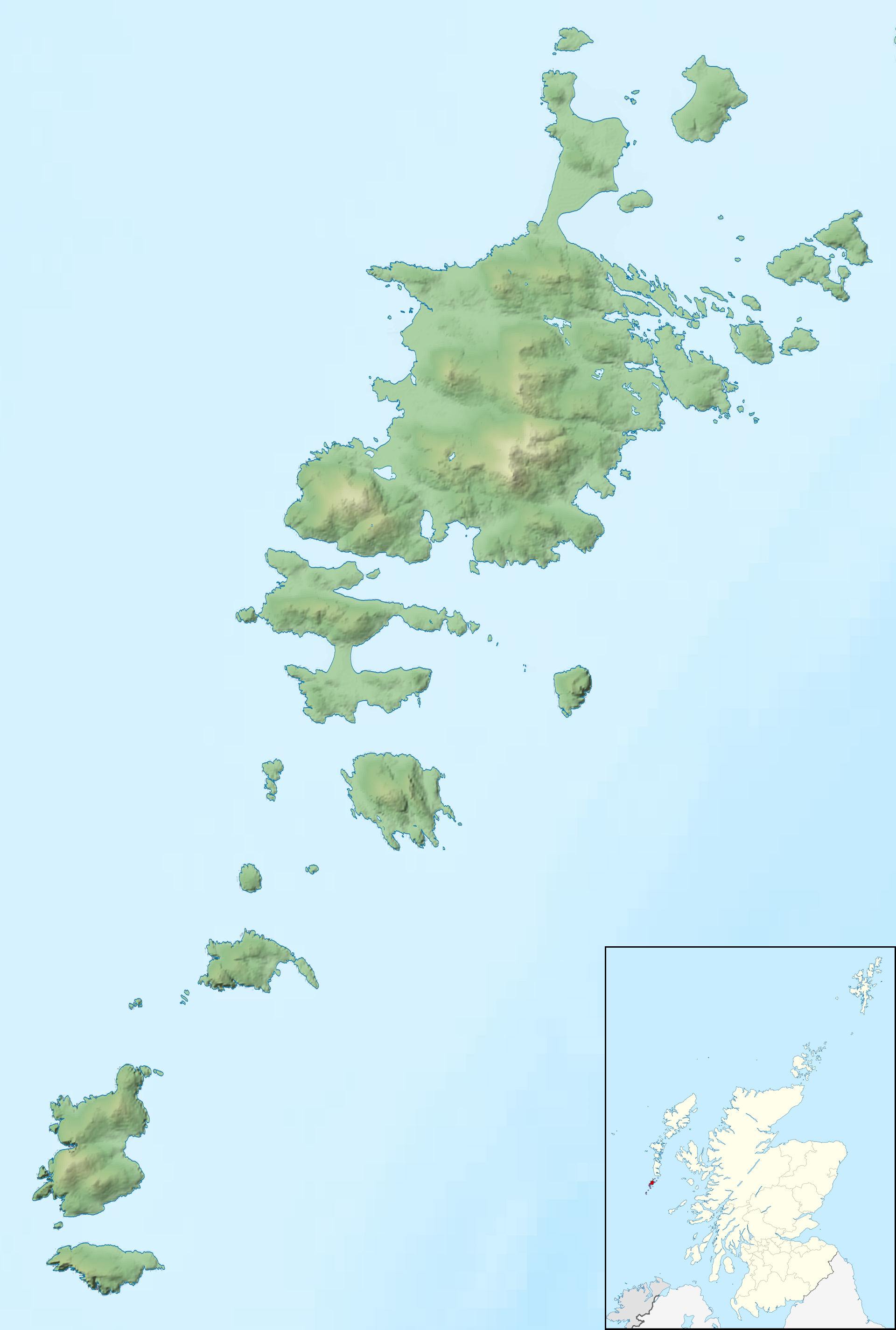
- Flodday shown next to Barra Flodday shown within the Outer Hebrides
- OS grid reference: NF751022
- Coordinates: 57.00°N 7.35°W

Name
- Name meaning: 'raft' or 'float' island
- Old Norse name: floti

Physical geography
- Island group: Uists and Barra
- Area: 40 ha (99 acres)
- Area rank: 220=
- Highest elevation: 41 m (135 ft)

Administration
- Council area: Na h-Eileanan Siar
- Country: Scotland
- Sovereign state: United Kingdom

Demographics
- Population: 0

Flodday or Flodaigh (Scottish Gaelic), is a currently uninhabited island that lies to the north east of Barra and is one of ten islands in the Sound of Barra, a Site of Community Importance for conservation in the Outer Hebrides, Scotland. Its name derives from the Old Norse for "flat island".

== Geography and geology ==
The island is gneiss with fertile soil. A reef to the north ends in a drying islet, Snagaras.

== History ==
Flodaigh supported one family until cleared in 1851.
