= Hellisay =

Island in the Sound of Barra

Theiliseigh (Gaelic)
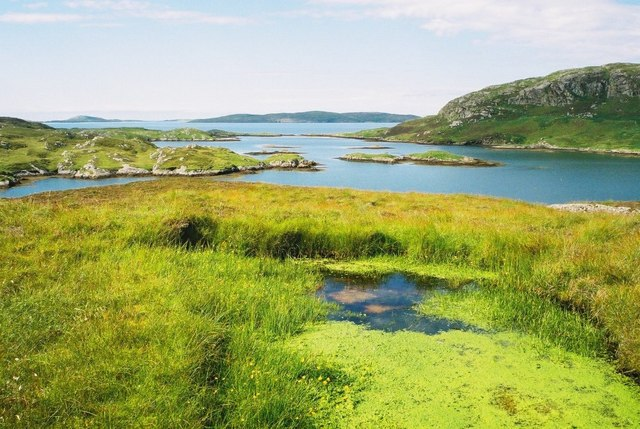
- The Sound of Gighay looking northwest from Càrais on Hellisay

Location
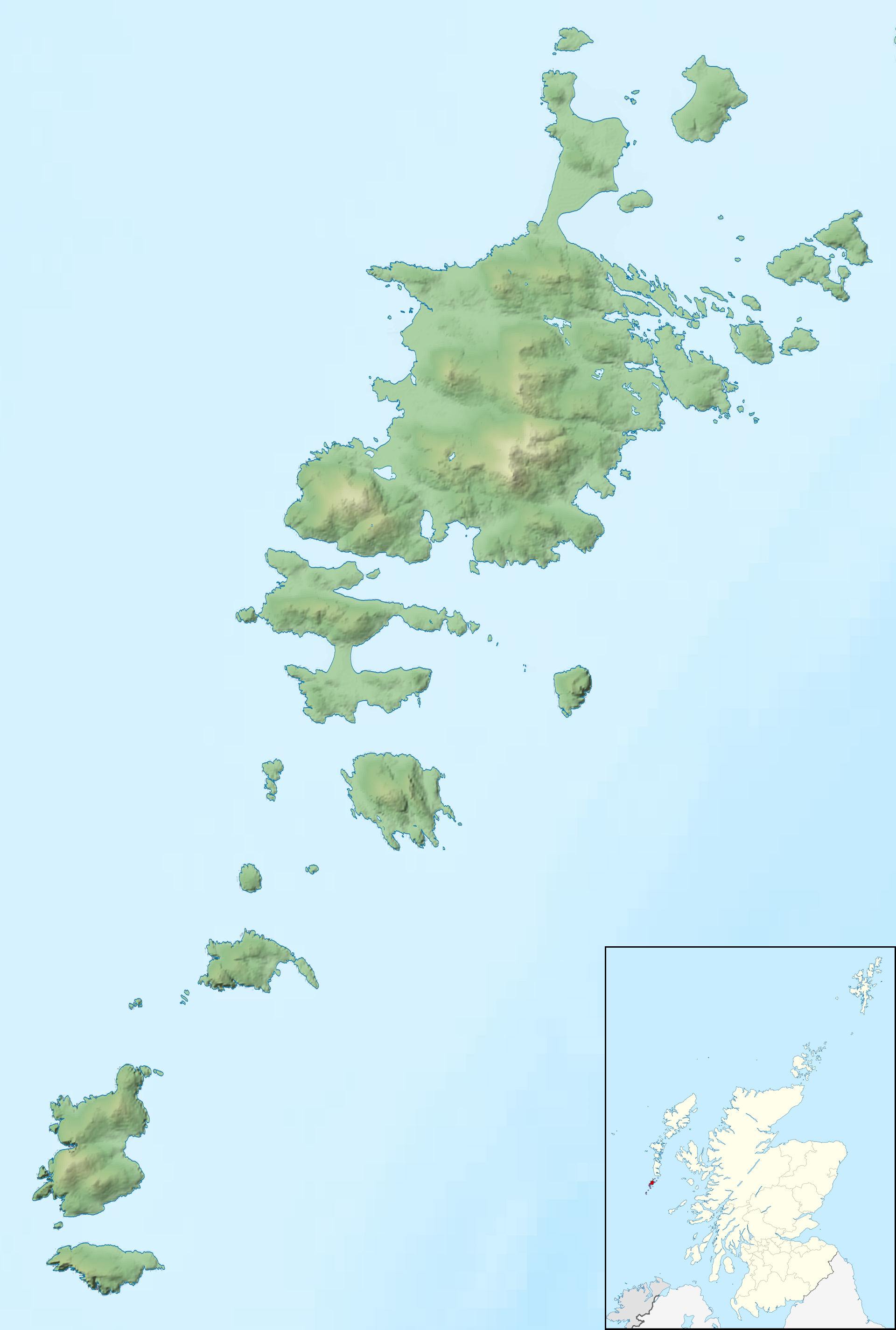
- Hellisay shown next to Barra Hellisay shown within the Outer Hebrides
- OS grid reference: NF756040
- Coordinates: 57.01°N 7.35°W

Name
- Name meaning: Old Norse: island of the caves

Physical geography
- Island group: Uists and Barra
- Area: 142 ha (9/16 sq mi)
- Area rank: 127=
- Highest elevation: Meall Meadhonach 79 m (259 ft)

Administration
- Council area: Na h-Eileanan Siar
- Country: Scotland
- Sovereign state: United Kingdom

Demographics
- Population: 0

Hellisay (Scottish Gaelic: Theiliseigh) is a currently uninhabited island and is one of ten islands in the Sound of Barra, a Site of Community Importance for conservation in the southern Outer Hebrides of Scotland. The narrow Sound of Gighay lies between Hellisay and its neighbouring island.

== Geography and geology ==
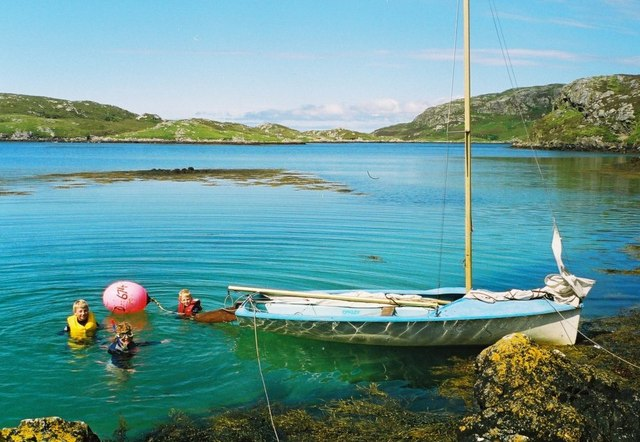
Bàgh Hintis looking west

Hellisay is one of ten islands in the Sound of Barra, a Site of Community Importance for conservation in the Outer Hebrides of Scotland. of a string of islands in the Sound of Barra, Hellisay lies close to its neighbour Gighay, with a narrow channel, the Sound of Gighay, between.

The bedrock is mainly gneiss with quartz veins.

There are several peaks on the island including Beinn a' Chàrnain in the west (mountain of the small cairn; 73 m or 240 ft), Meall Meadhonach (middle rounded hill; 79 m or 259 ft) and Meall Mòr (east of Meall Meadhonach and south of the peninsula of Càrais; 76 m or 249 ft).

== Wildlife ==
Along with a variety of seabirds, raptors including falcons and golden eagles have been seen on Hellisay. The island has a profusion of sea thrift and the Sound of Gighay has been described as a "quiet secret place of wild irises and marshmallows".

== History ==
The island's name is Old Norse in origin. It possibly means "island of the caves", which appears to be confirmed by the name Rubha na h-Uamh (headland of the cave) in the east of the island. However, Blaeu's map has "Hildesay", which suggests that the name may derive from the Norse for "Hilda's Island".

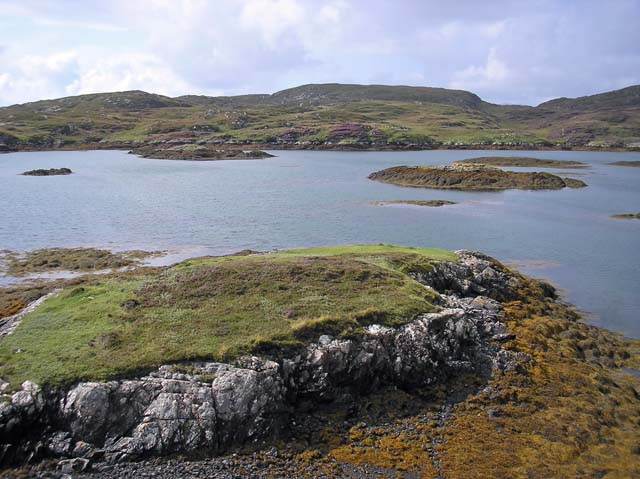
Hellisay from Gighay

The island's settlement was at Buaile Mhòr (anglicised to Bualavore and meaning "the big fold") near Eilean a' Ghamhna in the north west of the island. The remains of a sheep pen and a well can still be seen.

Like so many other islands in the region, Hellisay was badly affected by the Highland Clearances. Firstly, refugees from clearances in neighbouring islands swelled the population, and latterly the island's inhabitants themselves were evicted, and many went to live on Eriskay. The population peaked at 108 in 1841, and the island was cleared in the 1840s – however it continued to have some inhabitants up until 1890.

Alasdair Alpin MacGregor's stories reveal a rich folklore and mythology extant on the island, possibly only a fraction of which has been preserved.

== In Media ==
Franciscan priest, specialist in mystical theology and author Rayner Torrington wrote a book describing how he was influenced by meeting a hermit called Peter Calvay who lived on Hellisay for a number of years in the first half of the twentieth century. The book titled ‘Peter Calvay, hermit: A personal rediscovery of prayer’ was first published in 1977 and has had at least eleven reprintings. Torkington's book ‘Wisdom from the Western Isles: the making of a mystic’, published in 2008, also describes the author's meetings with Peter Calvay whilst the author was staying on the nearby island of Barra.

== See also ==
- List of the islands of the Sound of Barra
- List of islands of Scotland

== Notes and references ==
- Haswell-Smith, Hamish (2004). The Scottish Islands. Edinburgh: Canongate. ISBN 978-1-84195-454-7.
