= Gighay =

Island in the Outer Hebrides, Scotland

Gioghaigh (Gaelic)

Location
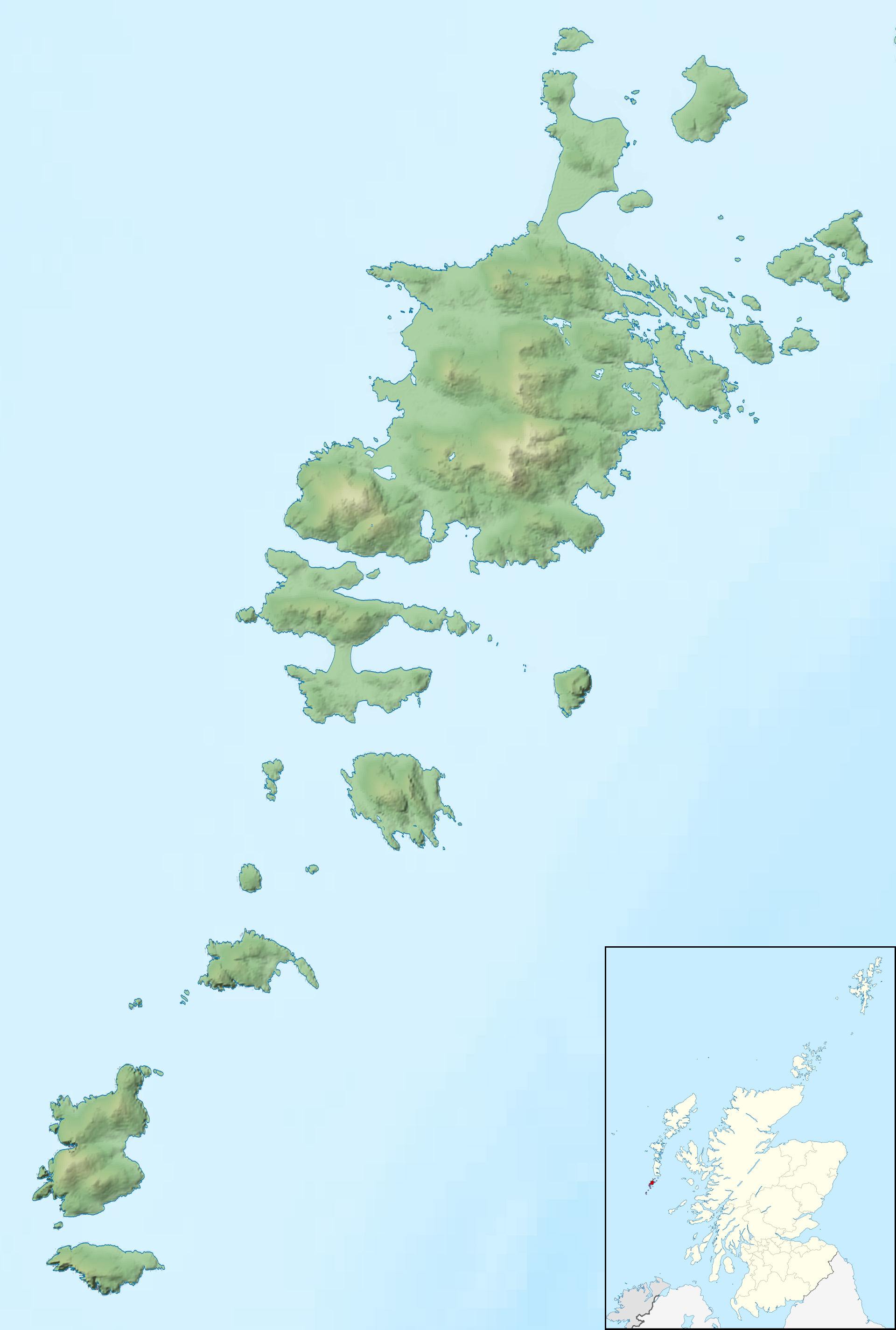
- Gighay shown next to Barra Gighay shown within the Outer Hebrides
- OS grid reference: NF764049
- Coordinates: 57.02°N 7.33°W

Name
- Name meaning: Old Norse: Gydha's island

Physical geography
- Island group: Uists and Barra
- Area: 96 ha (240 acres)
- Area rank: 152
- Highest elevation: Mullach a' Charnain 95 m (312 ft)

Administration
- Council area: Na h-Eileanan Siar
- Country: Scotland
- Sovereign state: United Kingdom

Demographics
- Population: 0

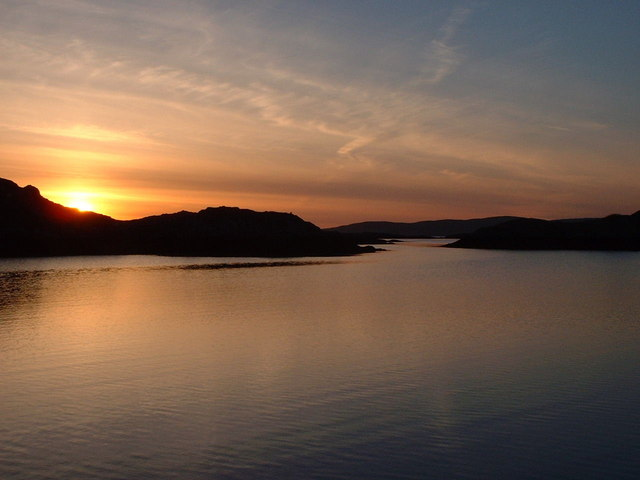
The harbour near Gioghaigh

Gighay (Scottish Gaelic Gioghaigh) an uninhabited island off the northeast coast of Barra. It is one of ten islands in the Sound of Barra, a Site of Community Importance for conservation in the Outer Hebrides of Scotland.

== Geography and geology ==
Gighay lies in the Sound of Barra between Barra and Eriskay, 2 1/2 miles (4 kilometres) southwest of Fuday. One of a string of islands between South Uist and Barra, Gighay is "locked" into its neighbour Hellisay, with a harbour between. It is mainly gneiss with quartz veins. Gighay has an area of 96 hectares (240 acres) and rises steeply to 95 metres (312 feet).

Gighay is owned by the Scottish Ministers (i.e. the Scottish government).
