= Fuday =

Uninhabited island in Scotland

Fùideigh (Gaelic)

Location
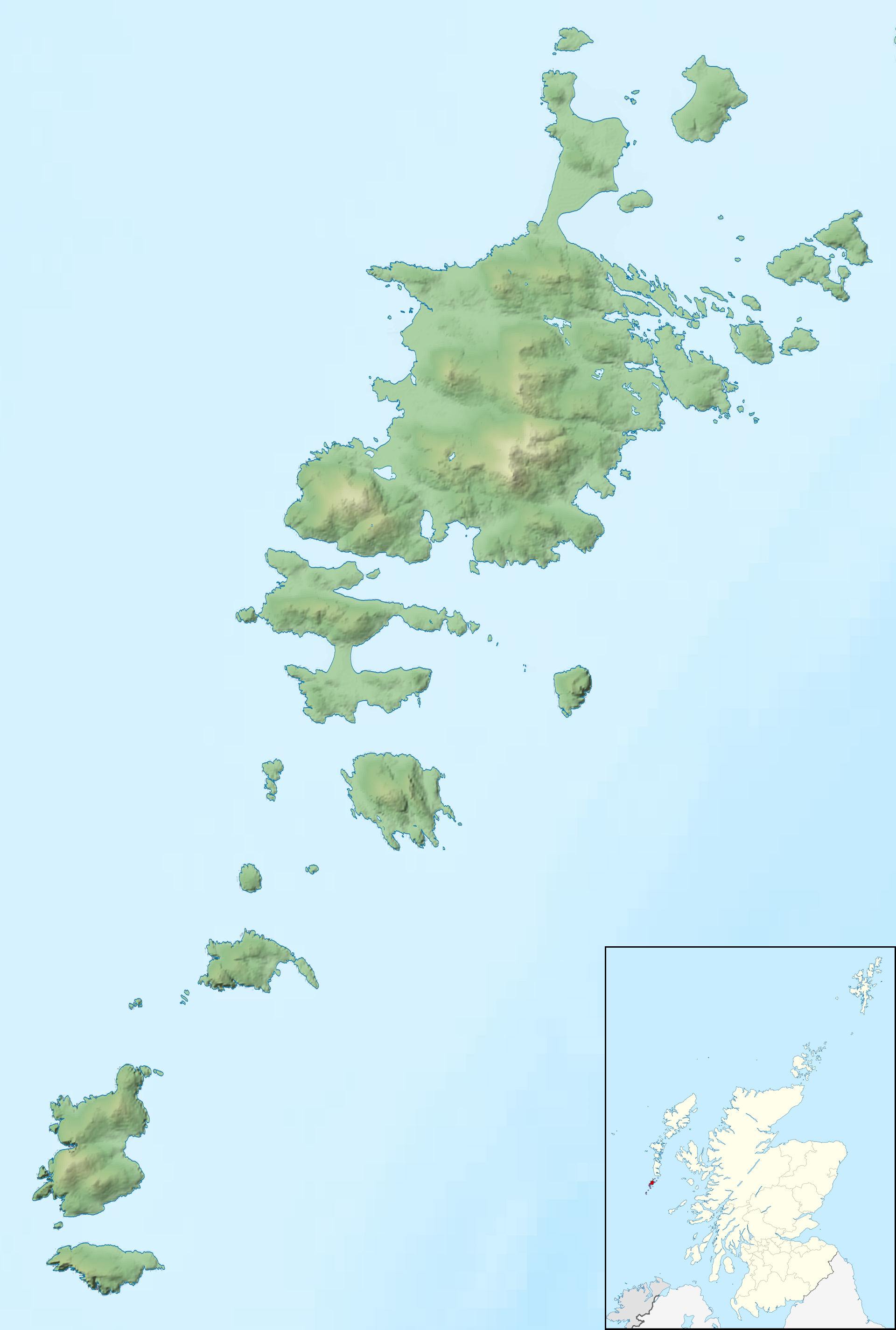
- Fuday shown next to Barra Fuday shown within the Outer Hebrides
- OS grid reference: NF736082
- Coordinates: 57.05°N 07.39°W

Physical geography
- Island group: Uists and Barra
- Area: 232 ha (7/8 sq mi)
- Area rank: 101
- Highest elevation: Mullach Neacail, 89 m (292 ft)

Administration
- Council area: Na h-Eileanan Siar
- Country: Scotland
- Sovereign state: United Kingdom

Demographics
- Population: uninhabited since 1901

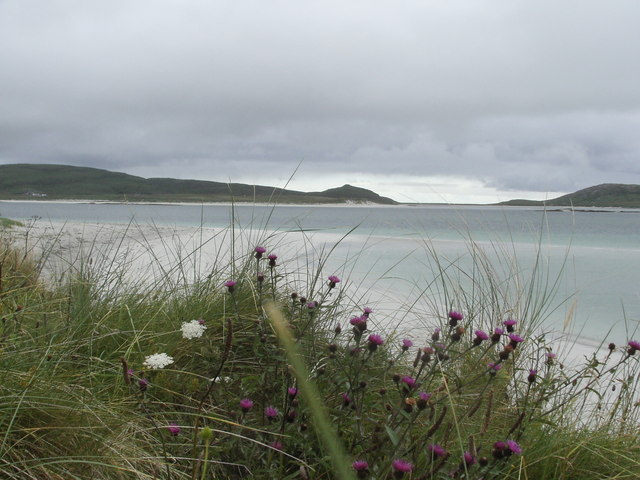
An Caolas Fuideach

Fuday (Scottish Gaelic: Fùideigh) is an uninhabited island of about 232 hectares (570 acres) and is one of ten islands in the Sound of Barra, a Site of Community Importance for conservation in the Outer Hebrides of Scotland. It lies just east of Scurrival Point on Barra and west of Eriskay. Fuday is owned by the Scottish Government. Deserted since 1901, its peak population is recorded only as seven.

It is still used for the summer grazing of cattle, and they used to be swum across the 1-mile-wide (2-kilometre), but shallow, Caolas Fuideach (strait) to there from Eoligarry. When cattle were first introduced to the island, they were killed by dehydration. The crofters who left the cattle on the island failed to show the animals the location of the only drinkable source of water on the island, a loch far inland on the island. The cattle thus could not find drinking water and died of thirst.
