= Lists of listed buildings in Shetland =

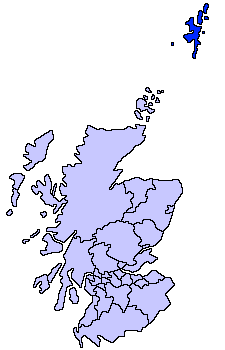
Shetland shown within Scotland

This is a list of listed buildings in the Shetland Islands. The list is split out by parish.

- List of listed buildings in Bressay, Shetland Islands
- List of listed buildings in Delting, Shetland Islands
- List of listed buildings in Dunrossness, Shetland Islands
- List of listed buildings in Fetlar, Shetland Islands
- List of listed buildings in Lerwick, Shetland Islands
- List of listed buildings in Nesting, Shetland Islands
- List of listed buildings in Northmavine, Shetland Islands
- List of listed buildings in Sandsting, Shetland Islands
- List of listed buildings in Tingwall, Shetland Islands
- List of listed buildings in Unst, Shetland Islands
- List of listed buildings in Walls And Sandness, Shetland Islands
- List of listed buildings in Yell, Shetland Islands

== See also ==
- Scheduled monuments in Shetland
