= List of listed buildings in Northmavine, Shetland Islands =

This is a list of listed buildings in the parish of Northmavine in the Shetland Islands, Scotland.

== List ==
Name	Location	Date Listed	Grid Ref. (Note: Sometimes known as OSGB36, the grid reference (where provided) is based on the British national grid reference system used by the Ordnance Survey. • "Guide to National Grid". Ordnance Survey. • "Get-a-map". Ordnance Survey.)	Geo-coordinates	Notes	LB Number (Note: Historic Environment Scotland assign a unique alphanumeric identifier to each designated site in Scotland, for listed buildings this always begins with "LB", for example "LB12345".)	Image
North Roe Post Office				60°34′44″N 1°19′57″W	Category C(S)	44560	Upload another image
Hillswick, Northmavine Kirk, Including Kirkyard Wall, Gate, And Gatepiers				60°28′37″N 1°29′13″W	Category B	19900	Upload another image
Ollaberry, Ollaberry Kirkyard Monument				60°30′25″N 1°20′02″W	Category B	18687	Upload Photo
Hillswick, Hillswick House, Including Gatepiers, Outbuildings, Cottage, Garden And Boundary Walls				60°28′34″N 1°29′19″W	Category B	18688	Upload Photo
Ollaberry, Ollaberry Bods, Including Retaining Wall And Steps				60°30′25″N 1°20′08″W	Category C(S)	44563	Upload Photo
North Roe Methodist Church, Including Railings				60°34′46″N 1°19′58″W	Category C(S)	44558	Upload another image
North Roe, Telephone Kiosk				60°34′44″N 1°19′57″W	Category B	44561	Upload another image
Ollaberry, Bardister Haa, With Outbuilding And Garden Walls				60°28′45″N 1°20′51″W	Category B	44562	Upload Photo
Hamnavoe, Johnny 'Notion' Williamson's House, Including Outbuildings				60°30′30″N 1°34′11″W	Category C(S)	18692	Upload another image
North Roe, North Haa, Including Walls And Outbuildings				60°35′09″N 1°19′55″W	Category C(S)	44559	Upload Photo
Hillswick, St Magnus Bay Hotel				60°28′36″N 1°29′17″W	Category C(S)	18689	Upload another image
Tangwick, Haa of Tangwick, Including Walled Garden				60°28′56″N 1°34′44″W	Category B	18690	Upload another image
Eshaness, Eshaness Lighthouse, Including Oil Tank, Sundial, And Gates				60°29′21″N 1°37′38″W	Category B	44556	Upload another image
North Roe, Lochend House, Including Outbuilding And Garden Wall				60°32′25″N 1°19′49″W	Category C(S)	44557	Upload Photo
Stenness, Stenness Fishing Station Bod				60°28′38″N 1°36′42″W	Category C(S)	44565	Upload another image
Ollaberry, Ollaberry Pier, Including Derrick And Walls				60°30′23″N 1°20′09″W	Category B	44564	Upload another image
Hillswick, Northmavine Manse, Including Garden And Boundary Walls And Outbuildings				60°28′26″N 1°29′24″W	Category B	18686	Upload another image
Ollaberry, Ollaberry House (Haa of Ollaberry), Including Outbuilding And Boundary Walls				60°30′25″N 1°20′10″W	Category B	18691	Upload Photo

== Key ==
The scheme for classifying buildings in Scotland is:

- Category A: "buildings of national or international importance, either architectural or historic; or fine, little-altered examples of some particular period, style or building type."
- Category B: "buildings of regional or more than local importance; or major examples of some particular period, style or building type, which may have been altered."
- Category C: "buildings of local importance; lesser examples of any period, style, or building type, as originally constructed or moderately altered; and simple traditional buildings which group well with other listed buildings."

In March 2016 there were 47,288 listed buildings in Scotland. Of these, 8% were Category A, and 50% were Category B, with the remaining 42% being Category C.
