= Johnnie Notions =

Shetland physician (c.1730–c.1803)

- Born: John Williamson c. 1730; Hamnavoe, Eshaness, Northmavine, Shetland, Scotland
- Died: c. 1803 (aged 72–73); Northmavine
- Burial place: Cross Kirk Cemetery, Esha Ness, Shetland; 60.485°N 1.615°W
- Monuments: Johnnie Notions' Böd
- Occupations: Physician; tailor; joiner; clock and watch-mender; blacksmith; farmer; fisherman; weaver
- Era: Age of Enlightenment
- Spouse: Christian Nicolson
- Children: 6
- Known for: Developing and administering an inoculation for smallpox
- Medical career
- Field: Physician
- Sub-specialties: Smallpox inoculation

John Williamson (c. 1730 – c. 1803), more commonly known by the nickname Johnnie Notions (Note: Also spelled Johnie, Johnny or Joannie) (Shaetlan pronunciation: ['dʒouni] JOH-nee) was a self-taught physician from Shetland, Scotland, who independently developed and administered an inoculation for smallpox to thousands of patients in Shetland during the late 18th century. Despite having only an elementary education and no formal medical background, the treatment he devised had an extremely high success rate, resulting in the immunisation of approximately 3,000 people and the saving of many lives, which had a significant effect on the demographics of the Shetland population at the time. He is reputed not to have lost a single patient.

While Notions administered his inoculation by at least the late 1780s to early 1790s (and likely much earlier), his method was largely overshadowed by the work of Edward Jenner, who pioneered the cowpox-based smallpox vaccine in 1796. Despite this, Notions and his inoculation were held with high regard with Shetlanders at the time, while the same could not be said for the cowpox-based vaccination introduced to Shetland in subsequent years.

== Early life ==
John Williamson was born the son of Andrew Williamson; his mother's name is unknown. It has been suggested that the practice of naming John by his father's own surname, not adopting the patronymics system that was prevalent in Shetland at that time, indicates that his immediate family could be considered progressive and modern for the time. John Williamson's birth year is not known with any certainty – while his tombstone states he was born in 1740, some have suggested he was born as early as 1730. His place of birth is also not certain, but is thought to be Hamnavoe, Eshaness, in which the Williamson family lived from at least the late 1740s and possibly much earlier.

== Smallpox inoculation ==
=== Background ===
Shetland, being a relatively isolated community, was susceptible to outbreaks of smallpox throughout the 18th century that would spread through large proportions of the population due to a lack of immunity to the disease. In 1700, an outbreak of smallpox arrived in Shetland when the son of a local man had visited mainland Britain, where he had contracted the disease and spread it upon his return to Shetland. An estimated one-third of Shetland's population died as the result of this epidemic. The disease was subsequently referred to as "mortal pox", while the 1700 outbreak was used by those born around this time as a reference to calculate their age. Some of the smaller islands of Shetland were particularly hard hit – Fair Isle had previously had between ten and twelve families, but is said to have lost two thirds of its population in the 1700 outbreak, leaving too few to effectively manage their fishing boats; in Fetlar smallpox killed over 90 islanders of whom "most were married people".

Smallpox would continue to strike Shetland every 20 years, with epidemics occurring in 1700, 1720, 1740 and 1760. The 1720 epidemic hit Foula particularly hard, where it is said "there were scarcely people left to bury the dead", whereas in Fetlar a certain amount of resistance is thought to have built up, as most of the 80 who died were under the age of 20.

The 1740 epidemic required the extension of the Lerwick cemetery by 50 feet (15 m), while in Fetlar a further 120 people died – this was exacerbated by a hard frost lasting over a month that prevented the dead from being buried. Approximately one-third of Unst's population was killed by smallpox. It is likely that Notions himself caught smallpox as a child of about ten during this epidemic.

=== Technique ===
Notions would first collect "matter" – i.e., smallpox pus. He would then dry it using peat smoke (which was believed to lessen the virus's virulence), and bury it in the ground with camphor (which has anti-bacterial properties, preventing the matter from decomposing). Oral history indicates the matter was spread between glass sheets before burial. It would be kept in this state for up to 7 or 8 years to reduce its virulence before being administered to a patient. By using a knife (which Notions made himself) he would cut into the patient's arm intradermally (without drawing blood), insert a small amount of the inoculant, and immediately cover the incision with the patient's skin, before using a cabbage leaf as a plaster. In contrast to contemporaneous quack doctors, Notions would not stipulate any particular resting conditions (such as "hot-treatment" – heating the ill patient in front of a fire, covering them with blankets and allowing them no fresh-air), nor would he administer any other medicines during the period of infection and recovery.

Notions' inoculation bears a strong similarity to the Suttonian method, which also involved the introduction of weakened smallpox matter into the patient through intradermal means. The weakening of the smallpox virus could be considered a form of attenuation which is a consideration in modern-day vaccines. How Notions became aware of this method of inoculation is unclear – it may have been through written account, or through discussion with someone else aware of the technique, such as another physician or a member of the clergy.

=== Results ===
It is not known whether the success of the inoculation technique used by Notions was due to its ability to decrease the virulence of the smallpox matter, or to the shallow intradermal insertion of the inoculant. The technique was highly successful and it and Notions was highly esteemed in Shetland.

Notions was revered in contemporary accounts for the work he did. Reverend Andrew Dishington, the parish minister for Mid and South Yell, attested to the success of Notions' treatment:

Unassisted by education, and unfettered by the rules of art, he stands unrivalled in this business. Several thousands have been inoculated by him, and he has not lost a single patient. ...It is particularly remarkable, that there is not a single instance in his practice, where the infection has not taken place, and made its appearance at the usual time.

In Arthur Edmondston's account, he commented that Notions' work:

...met with such unexampled success in his practice, that were I not able to bear testimony to its truth, I should myself be disposed to be sceptical on the subject. ...Had every practitioner been as uniformly successful in the disease as he was, the small-pox might have been banished from the face of the earth, without injuring the system, or leaving any doubt as to the fact.

Oral history recounts that Notions was able to save 16 of the 24 remaining inhabitants of Foula after an epidemic of smallpox struck there, and that he was "greatly honoured" for having saved their lives.

It is not clear how many patients of Notions may have contracted secondary infections following inoculation. Also, it is possible that Notions' treatment may have caused some patients such as Lowrie Tulloch of Burravoe, Yell, or James Park of Fetlar to have been blinded. Notions is believed to have saved many more lives than he caused harm to.

== Other occupations ==
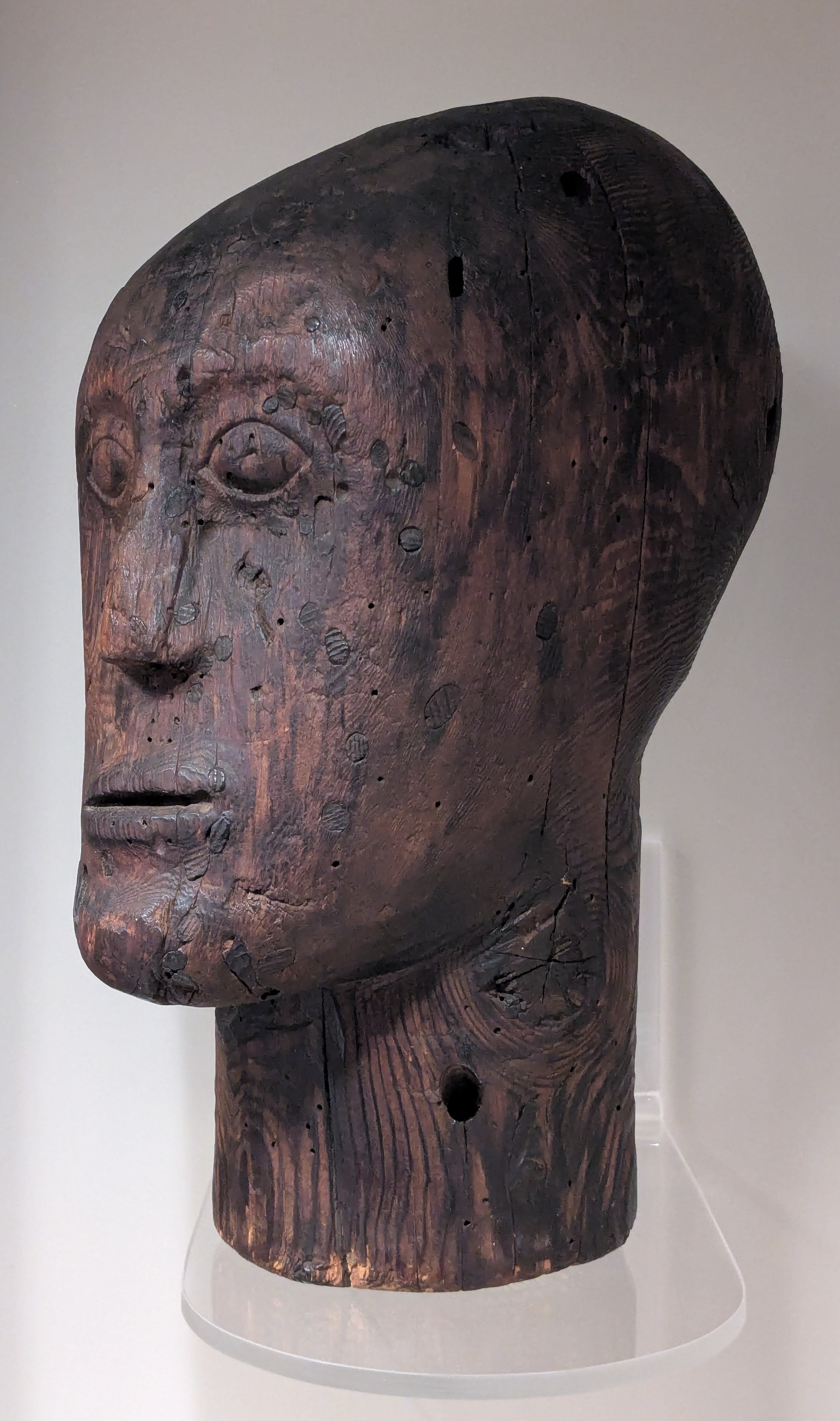
A wig stretcher made by Johnnie Notions for the Cheynes of Tangwick.

Notions was considered someone who could apply his manual skills to many different trades and crafts. He was described during his lifetime as "a singular instance of an uncommon variety of talents, being a tailor, a joiner, a clock and watch-mender, a blacksmith, and a physician". He was additionally attributed with being (at various periods throughout his life) a farmer, fisherman, and weaver.

Archivist Brian Smith at the Shetland Museum and Archives recounts how he is said to have been assigned the nickname "Notions", which he was called by his contemporaries:

...[the name "Notions"] was bestowed on him by a member of the Gifford family. (Note: The Giffords of Busta, "the most prosperous merchant-laird [s] in the islands") According to this story, Williamson was at Gifford's house, presumably on business, and the landlord asked him to rid his house of 'checks', small noisy wood-boring beetles. Williamson looked behind the clock and cleared away a mass of creepy crawlies. 'You hear no more checks now,' he said. Gifford replied, fatuously, 'What a notions!'

Notions is also said to have constructed a complex functional miniature watermill, which was based on a mill which he had only viewed a single time. It was capable of performing the same function of bleaching as the original mill through the power of a hand-turned crank.

The only known remaining work of Notions is a wig stretching block that was made for James Cheyne, 7th Laird of Tangwick (the great-grandfather of Sir William Watson Cheyne), who was the laird of the area around Eshaness. The block is said to have been made in the image of a man from Hillswick who contracted smallpox and was treated by Notions. It is made from a worm-eaten piece of wood, the holes of which were filled with smaller pieces of wood to portray the smallpox scars on the man's face. The wig block is now kept in the Shetland Museum.

== Johnnie Notions' Böd ==
Johnnie Notions' Böd
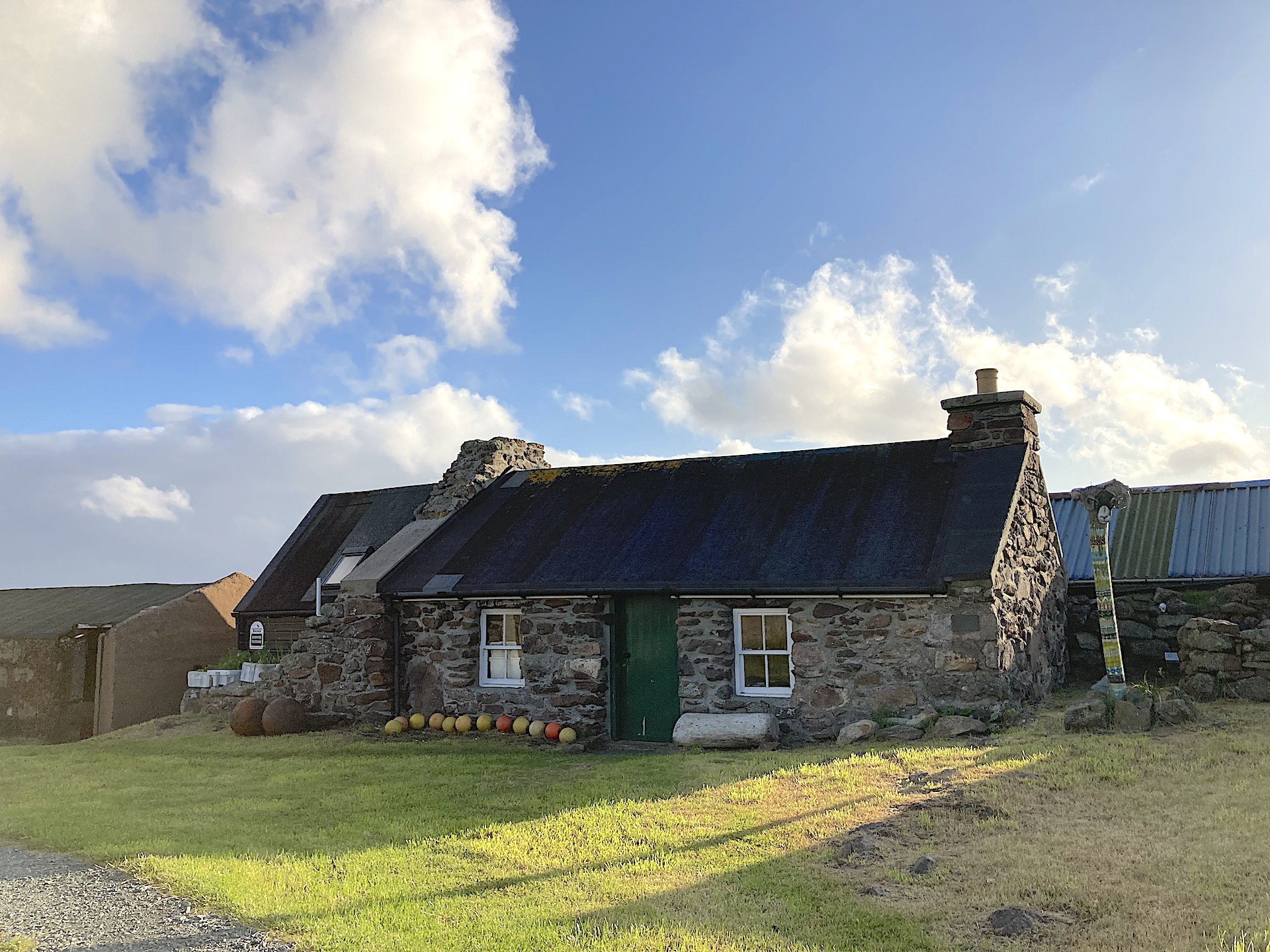
- Johnnie Notions' Böd

- Location within Shetland
- Etymology: Fisherman's lodgings or store

General information
- Type: Camping barn
- Architectural style: Scottish Vernacular
- Location: Hamnavoe, Northmavine, Shetland, Scotland
- Coordinates: 60°30′29.8″N 1°34′11.7″W
- Named for: Johnnie Notions
- Owner: Shetland Amenity Trust

Height
- Roof: Felt

Technical details
- Material: Harl-pointed stone
- Floor count: 1

Design and construction
- Designations: Category C listed building

Other information
- Number of rooms: 1

Website
- www.camping-bods.com/Johnnie-Notions-g.asp

An outbuilding near to the site of Johnnie Notions' house in Hamnavoe, Eshaness is offered as a "camping böd" (böd being the Shetland dialect word for a fisherman's lodgings or store) which is rented out by the Shetland Amenity Trust as basic accommodation with limited facilities in the style of a camping barn. Johnnie Notions' Böd does not have an electricity supply, for example. The böd is open from 1 April to 31 October.

Notions' original house and its outbuildings were designated as a Category C listed building in 1978.

== Sources ==
- Blance, Rosabel (1960). "A wig stretcher carved by Johnny Notions, a Shetland inventor" (Reel to reel tape recording). Interviewed by Tom Anderson.
- Bowie, Hamish (2003). "A Shetland Story". baysights.com. Shetland Story No.1 – Johnnie Notions. Archived from the original on 26 May 2022.
- Brand, John (1809) [1701]. Pinkerton, John (ed.). A brief description of Orkney, Zetland, Pightland Firth, and Caithness, etc (In Pinkerton, John, Ed. A general collection of the best and most interesting voyages and travels). London. p. 782. OCLC 1041608289. OL 13997155M.
- Conacher, Ian D. (2001). "The enigma of Johnnie "Notions" Williamson". Journal of Medical Biography. 9 (4): 208–212. doi:10.1177/096777200100900403. PMID 11595947. S2CID 41392514.
- Cowie, Robert (1874). "Chapter X: Small-pox". Shetland: descriptive and historical; being a graduation thesis on the inhabitants of the Shetland Islands; and a topographical description of that country (2nd ed.). Edinburgh & Glasgow: John Menzies & Co. pp. 72–76 – via Google Books.
- Dishington, Andrew (1999) [1792]. Sinclair, Sir John (ed.). "United Parishes of Mid and South Yell". The Statistical Account of Scotland Drawn up from the Communications of the Ministers of the Different Parishes. 2 (50). University of Edinburgh, University of Glasgow: Edinburgh: William Creech: 569–571. OCLC 1045293275. Archived from the original on 29 August 2021 – via The Statistical Accounts of Scotland online service.
- Edmondston, Arthur (1809). A view of the ancient and present state of the Zetland islands. Vol. II. Edinburgh: John Ballantyne and Co. pp. 83–91. OCLC 213599237. OL 23529045M – via archive.org.
- Graham, John (2009) [1979]. "böd". Shetland Forwirds.
- Henderson, Brucie (February 1960). "John Williamson made a serum to cure smallpox in the early seventeenth century" (Reel to reel tape recording). Interviewed by Elizabeth Storey, unknown male.
- Henderson, Brucie (20 September 1970). "Johnnie Notions' cures; an attempt to locate his grave" (Reel to reel tape recording). Interviewed by Alan J Bruford, Tom Anderson.
- Henderson, Brucie; Anderson, Tom (20 September 1970). "Anecdote about interest in Johnnie Notions; history of a bust he carved; his smallpox vaccine" (Reel to reel tape recording). Interviewed by Alan J Bruford, Tom Anderson.
- Jack, William (1999) [1794]. Sinclair, Sir John (ed.). "Northmaven". The Statistical Account of Scotland Drawn up from the Communications of the Ministers of the Different Parishes. 12 (27). University of Edinburgh, University of Glasgow: Edinburgh: William Creech: 363. OCLC 1045293275. Archived from the original on 20 January 2026 – via The Statistical Accounts of Scotland online service.
- Musser, Liz, ed. (6 November 2023). "Johnnie Notions, Shetland's Great Inoculator". Written, directed by Liz Musser; Produced and animated by JJ Jamieson; Narrated by Claire White. Shetland Museum and Archives and Shetland Amenity Trust – via YouTube.
- Smith, Brian (July 1998). "Camphor, Cabbage Leaves and Vaccination: the Career of Johnie 'Notions' Williamson of Hamnavoe, Eshaness, Shetland" (PDF). Proceedings of the Royal College of Physicians of Edinburgh. 28 (3). Royal College of Physicians of Edinburgh: 395–406. doi:10.1177/147827159802800312. PMID 11620446. S2CID 734446. Archived from the original (PDF) on 31 July 2020.
- Smith, Brian (2004). Oxford dictionary of national biography : in association with the British Academy : from the earliest times to the year 2000. Vol. 59. Matthew, H. C. G. (Henry Colin Gray), Harrison, Brian, 1937–, British Academy. Oxford; New York: Oxford University Press. p. 349. ISBN 019861411X. OCLC 54778415 – via archive.org.
- "History". Tangwick Haa Museum. 2016.
- "Joannie Notions Head". Shetland Museum and Archives Photo Library. Photo Number 02151.
- "Johnnie Notions". HEARD Hillswick and Eshaness Area Regeneration & Development Association. 2006. Archived from the original on 12 November 2020.
- "Johnnie Notions Böd". Shetland Camping Böds. 2007.
