= Geopark Shetland =

Geological park in Scotland

Coordinates: 60.3°N 1.2°W

Geopark Shetland is the name used by the geopark formally established in September 2009 upon its entry into the European Geoparks Network. The geopark extends across the entire Shetland archipelago, off the north coast of mainland Scotland. It is administered by the Shetland Amenity Trust in partnership with organisations such as Scottish Natural Heritage, the Shetland Islands Council, Highlands and Islands Enterprise, and various community and tourism associations.

== Features ==
Shetland's natural attractions are focussed on its extensive and spectacular coastline, along which its complex geology is magnificently displayed. This includes most of the rock groups that make up the highlands of Scotland, including Lewisian gneiss, rocks of the Wester Ross Supergroup, Dalradian and Old Red Sandstone, together with the most complete ophiolite section to be found in Britain. Of particular note are the cliff section through an extinct volcano at Esha Ness in Northmavine, the ocean floor rocks that underlie the eastern side of the island of Unst and much of Fetlar, and the sand tombolo at St Ninian's Isle off South Mainland.
