= Calder's Geo =

Coordinates: 60°29′27″N 1°37′18″W

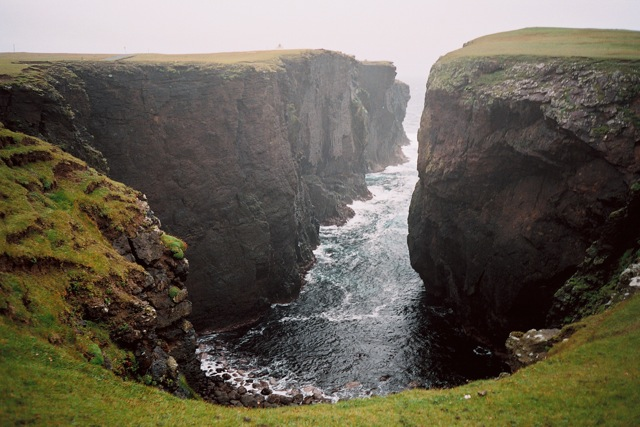
Calders Geo

Calders Geo (Shaetlan pronunciation: [ˈkaɫdərs ˌgjoː] KAL-dərs-GYOH) is an inlet in the western cliffs of Esha Ness in Northmavine on the Mainland, Shetland, Scotland. A cave on the north side of the geo has been measured at more than one and a half times the size of "The Frozen Deep", a chamber in Reservoir Hole under Cheddar Gorge in Somerset, potentially making it the largest natural chamber in Britain.

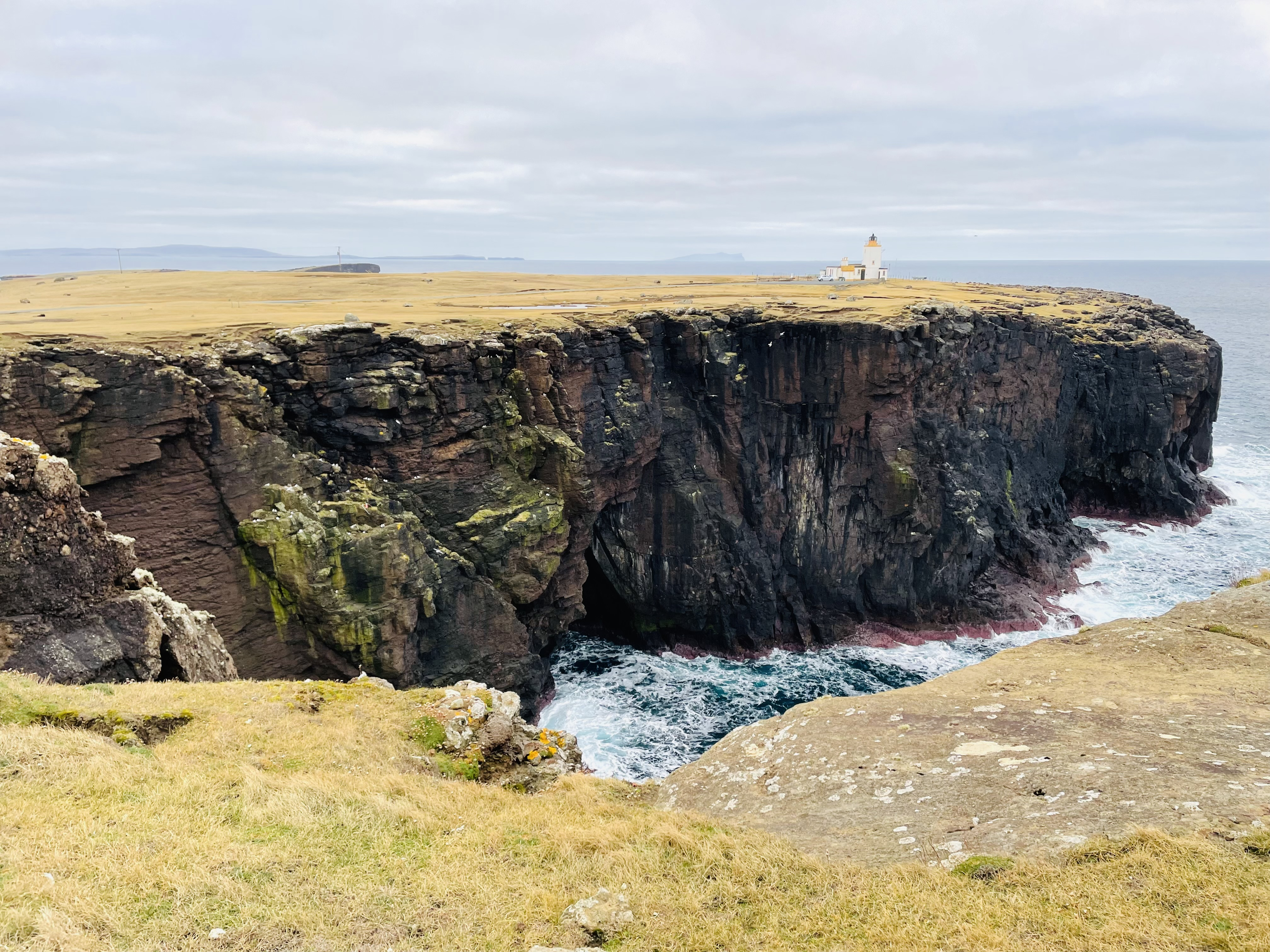
Calders Geo with cave visible

Geologist Jonathan Swale used a laser range-finder to measure the interior of the cave, which is only accessible during calm seas. He claims that the structure is over 20 metres (66 ft) tall and has a floor area of around 5,600 square metres (60,000 sq ft).

Esha Ness Lighthouse adjacent to the north of the geo was designed by David Alan Stevenson and commissioned in 1929.
