= Gunnister Man =

18th-century bog body found on the Shetland Islands

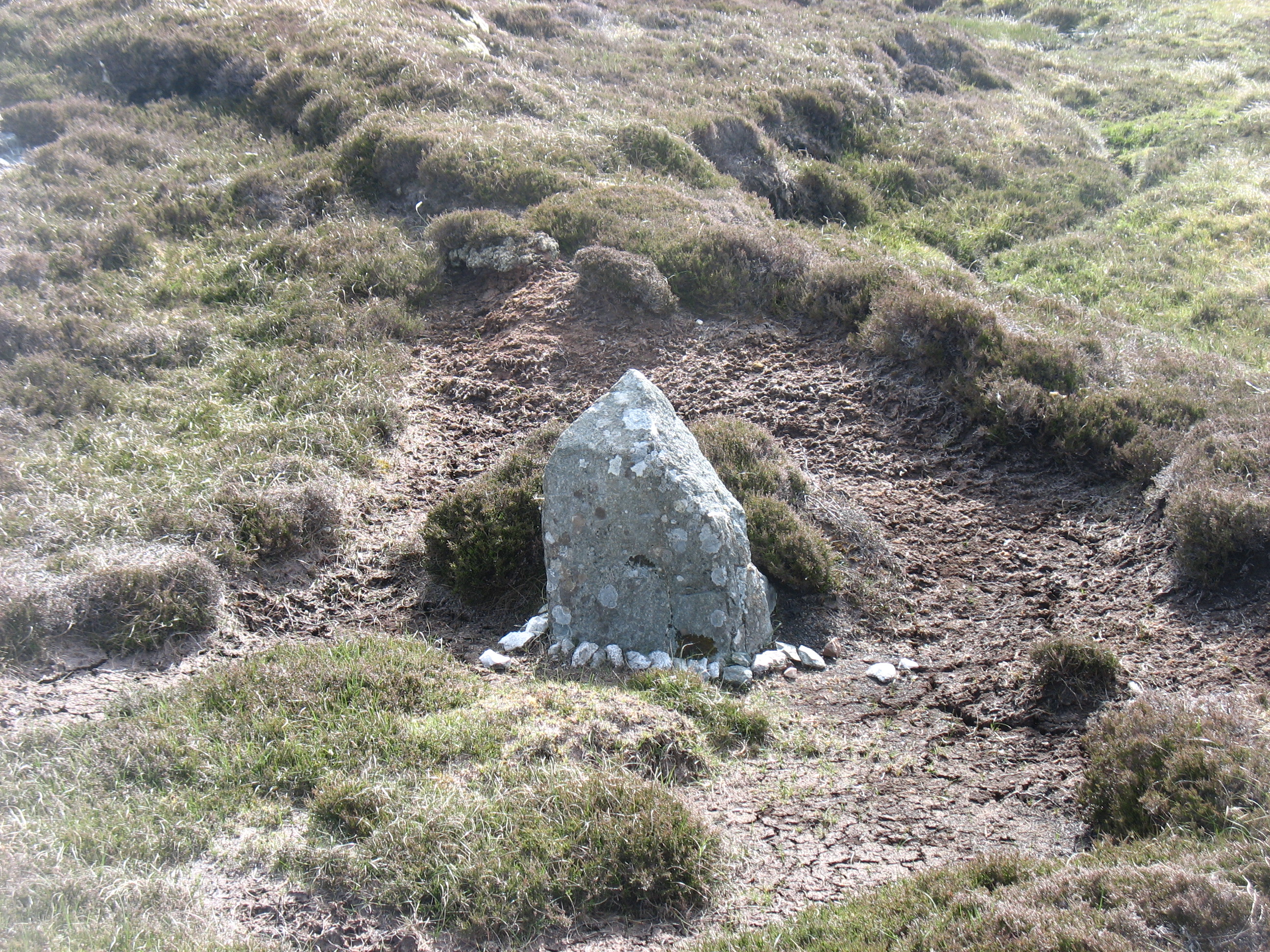
- Stone marking the discovery site near Gunnister
- Died: Late 17th or early 18th century
- Known for: Bog body with well-preserved woollen clothing and personal belongings dating from the late 17th or early 18th century

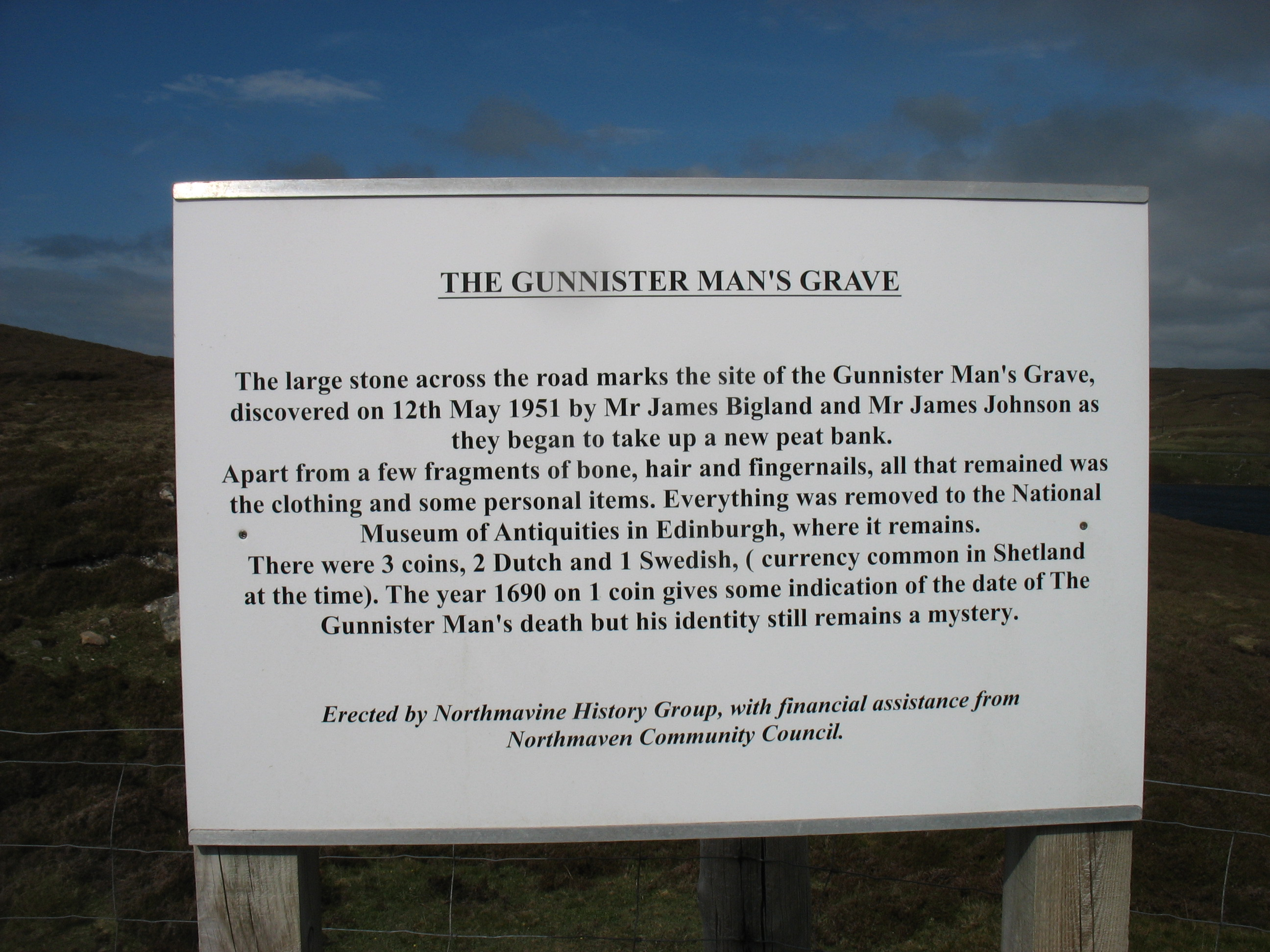
"Gunnister Man's Grave" notice

The Gunnister Man is the remains of a late 17th- or early 18th-century man found by two Shetlanders in a peat bog not far from the junction of the A970 road in Gunnister, Shetland, Scotland. The bog body was found on 12 May 1951 as the men were digging peat for fuel. A stone placed by the Northmavine History Group now marks the find location.

== Description ==
The body is believed to date from the late 17th or early 18th century. Three coins found in a knitted purse were a 6-Stuiver piece from Nijmegen (Netherlands) dated to 1690, a 2-Stuiver piece from Overijssel dated to 1681 and a 1/6 Öre from Sweden dating from 1683. The knitted purse found with the body is believed to be the earliest example of two-colour knitting in Shetland. The man was dressed in many woollen clothes, all of which survived burial in the peat in excellent condition. He wore a woollen shirt, a suit of long coat and short wide breeches, and an outer jacket. He had two caps, a pair of gloves and knitted stockings. His remains suggest he was walking during wintertime, and he may have died of illness or exposure. It is not possible to see any settlement from where he was buried and weather in late 17th- and early 18th-century northern Europe was extremely cold and stormy. His body was buried purposefully, with the objects he carried buried carefully with him. It is not known if he was a Shetlander or a visitor to the islands. The coins were common in Shetland at that time because of trade by north European merchants, so these do not give any indication of his origin.

Other items found included a leather belt, a silk ribbon, three woollen cords, a small knitted fragment, a birch stick, a wooden stave tub, a knife handle, a horn spoon, a quill, a horn container with a wooden stopper, and two flat pieces of wood. The only remains of the body were a piece of skull with dark hair, finger and toe nails, fragments of bone from the sleeves and in one stocking.

== Items found on the body ==
All objects in the original find went to Edinburgh and are now in the National Museums of Scotland collections. Some objects are on permanent display in various parts of NMS galleries. Immediately after the burial was discovered, the finds were taken to a local house, where some people knitted replicas of the stockings and purse. These replicas are on display in Tangwick Haa Museum in Northmavine, Shetland. In 2009, Shetland Museum and Archives made full replicas of all of the finds, which are together displayed in a permanent Gunnister Man display in Lerwick, Shetland.

The purse was originally a natural mixed grey colour, with stripes of red and white pattern on it. It is difficult to know if the man's garments were knitted in Shetland or elsewhere, but even if they weren't, it proves that stranded knitting, now known as Fair Isle knitting, had been at least seen in Shetland by the beginning of the 18th century. His gloves are well-knitted with decorative stitches on the upper palms and gauntlets. They are similar to other gloves of the period. The palm of the right glove is more worn and patched than the left glove, suggesting he was right-handed.

A small piece of open-work knitting was found with the man's findings, with a pattern of three concentric diamonds, but no worked edge. Small pieces of knitting were also found sewn into the lining of the man's jacket, and this fragment may have been kept to use as a patch.

== See also ==
- List of bog bodies
