= Mavis Grind =

Isthmus on Mainland, Shetland, Scotland

Coordinates: 60.3980°N 1.3850°W

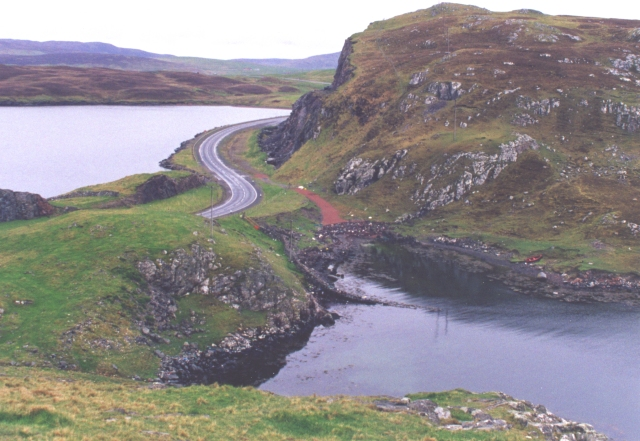
Mavis Grind, looking south, with an inlet of St Magnus Bay at right and Sullom Voe to the left

Mavis Grind ((Shaetlan pronunciation: [ˌmevis ˈgrɪnd] MAY-veess GRINND; Old Norse: Mæfeiðs grind or Mæveiðs grind, meaning "gate of the narrow isthmus") (Note: The Norse components are maev "narrow"; eid "isthmus" and grind "gate") is a narrow isthmus joining the Northmavine peninsula to the rest of the island of Mainland in the Shetland Islands, Scotland. It is just over 90 metres (295 ft) at its narrowest point.

Mavis Grind carries the main A970 road to Hillswick in the northwest of Shetland and is about two miles (3.2 km) west of the settlement of Brae. It is said to be the only place in the UK where you can toss a stone across land from the North Sea to the Atlantic Ocean. To the west of the isthmus is St Magnus Bay of the Atlantic and to the east is Sullom Voe, an arm of the North Sea.

It is a regular crossing point for otters, which in Shetland are sea-dwelling. In 1999, local volunteers successfully helped to demonstrate whether Viking ships could be carried across the isthmus, instead of sailing around the end of the island.

Remains of a late Bronze Age settlement have been found close by.

== In popular culture ==
Dorian Cope was credited as 'Mavis Grind' on the Julian Cope albums Autogeddon and 20 Mothers.
