= Tom Anderson (fiddler) =

- Born: 29 August 1910; Eshaness, Shetland Islands, Scotland
- Died: 20 September 1991 (aged 81) Lerwick, Shetland Islands, Scotland
- Genres: Folk music
- Occupations: Musician, Music teacher, composer
- Instrument: Fiddle
- Years active: – 1991

Tom (Tammy) Anderson MBE (1910–1991) was a Scottish fiddler, teacher, composer and collector of traditional tunes. He has been described as "...the most prominent personality in the entire history of Shetland fiddling."

== Early life ==
Born on 29 August 1910 on the "Moorfield" croft at Eshaness, Shetland Islands, Scotland. Anderson was the oldest child of James Anderson (born 26 September 1879, Hamnavoe, Eshaness) and his wife Harriet Margaret Johnson (born 24 April 1882, Avensgarth, Eshaness). Brought up in a musical home, he learnt to play the fiddle from his grandfather; as a teenager he played in local bands for weddings and dances in the Northmavine area.

== Adulthood ==
On leaving school he had various jobs in the area: fishing, helping to build Eshaness Lighthouse, labouring on a whaling station. Keen on radio, he assembled and sold radio sets locally and ran a battery charging service. He married Barbara Morrison (born 17 October 1901, Garderhouse, Sandsting), a teacher in Esha Ness, on 10 December 1929 at the Ollaberry United Free Church. They had one child, James John Laurence, who died at the age of five weeks.

In 1933 he became a local collector for the Pearl Assurance Company in Northmavine, then in 1936 moved to live in Lerwick. By this time he was a talented fiddle player with a wide repertoire of Scottish and Shetland tunes. He soon made his mark in Lerwick musical circles, playing with the amateur Lerwick Orchestra and in dance bands. When war broke out in 1939 Tammy's interest in radio took him into the RAF, ultimately as a radar mechanic, and he was posted to India. Here he encountered the many forms of Indian traditional music, and was inspired to begin a personal crusade to save what remained of Shetland's traditional fiddle music, after his demob and return home in 1945.

The Shetland Folk Society was formed in 1945 to preserve Shetland's heritage and traditions, and he became one of its principal music collectors and leader of its Traditional Band. In 1948 he started the Islesburgh Dance Band and by 1960 he was still the leader (it disbanded in 1968) and playing tuba in Lerwick Brass Band. It was the first Shetland Hamefarin in 1960, when over a hundred Shetland emigrants returned home in a group to an organised welcome and holiday, that really brought him into the public eye. As part of the exiles' entertainment, a huge variety concert was planned in Lerwick, and traditional fiddle music was called for. The concert was opened by selections by forty 'massed fiddlers fae aa ower', whom Tom had collected together over the preceding winter, rehearsed and led. No other musician in Shetland had such breadth of knowledge and experience so he was the natural organiser for the massed Hamefarin Fiddlers. They captured the imagination of local audiences and found themselves in huge demand at local concerts.

The result was that on 29 June 1960, in Islesburgh House, Lerwick, the Shetland Fiddlers' Society was formed and one of their first engagements was to play for Elizabeth II and Prince Philip in August that year. They were dubbed the Forty Fiddlers by reporter Magnus Magnusson during that Royal visit. Since that summer they've met almost every Wednesday night to practise their repertoire of traditional and contemporary Shetland tunes.

Tom led the Fiddlers' Society for twenty years until 1980. He collected music intensively for twenty five years, and edited a musical collection for Shetland Folk Society.

From 1970 Anderson campaigned to have the fiddle taught in Shetland schools as part of the curriculum and, when successful, he became the first official fiddle teacher in the Shetland school system.

Aly Bain was the first of his many pupils. Anderson had retired from the Pearl Assurance company in 1971, but in 1972 he was appointed the first fiddle tutor in Shetland schools – a hugely significant event. Through the 1970s he built up a huge following of young fiddlers, particularly in the Northern Isles.

== Recognition ==
His passion for his work in traditional music made him well known in Scottish traditional musical circles and was recognised by the award in 1977 of an MBE. He also taught outside Shetland; his first summer school class in traditional fiddling in Stirling University was held in 1978. In 1981 he became Doctor Tom – an honorary award from the university in recognition of his services to traditional music.

A group of his pupils from Lerwick and nearby were dubbed 'Tammy's Peerie Angels' when they performed at local concerts in Shetland around 1980 – soon they got the more appropriate title of Shetland's Young Heritage. Now they are Shetland's Heritage Fiddlers. During those years, they have played, to quote Tammy himself, 'all around the world and at many other places!’

== Compositions ==
From an early age Tammy was composing fiddle tunes, and throughout his life produced over 300 melodies, the earliest in 1936, the last dated July 1988. Perhaps his best-known tune is the slow air Da Slockit Light inspired by the depopulation of his Eshaness birthplace.

"I was coming out of Eshaness in late January, 1969, the time was after 11 pm and as I looked back at the top of the hill leading out of the district, I saw so few lights compared to what I remembered when I was young. As I watched, the lights started going out one by one. That, coupled with the recent death of my wife, made me think of the old word ‘Slockit’ meaning, a light that has gone out, and I think that is what inspired the tune" – from a taped interview with Tammy by a student in 1970. During his lifetime many of his tunes were published in three books; Haand me doon da Fiddle, Gie's an A' and 'Ringing Strings.

== Death and legacy ==
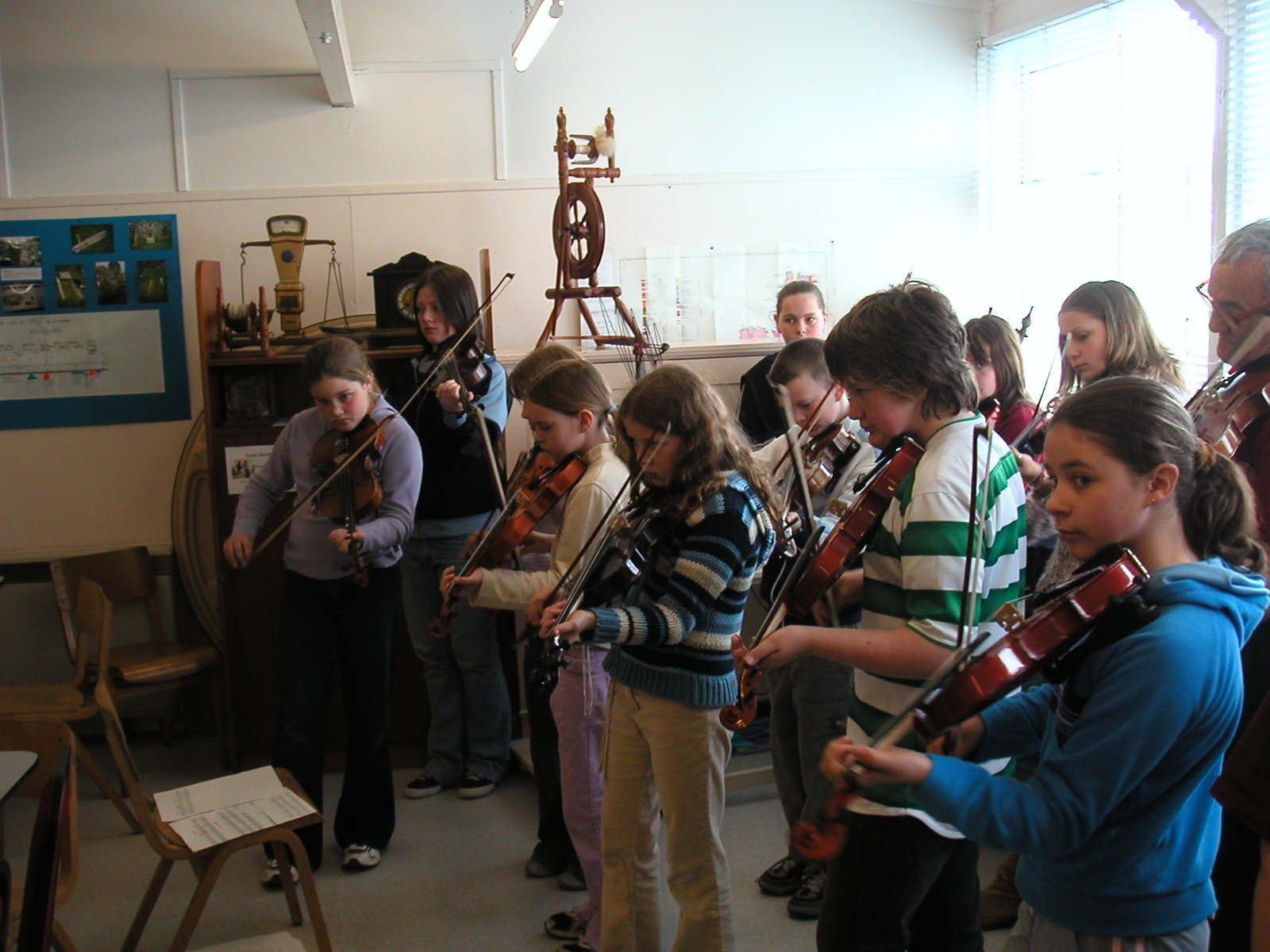
Shetland schoolchildren fiddlers, Unst, 2004

Anderson died on 20 September 1991, in Montfield Hospital, Lerwick, five weeks after his 81st birthday. In his lifetime he taught hundreds of pupils. Today the sons and daughters of his pupils are coming to the fore in schools music in Shetland, while Aly Bain and many others have achieved fame world-wide.

In wider Shetland musical circles, he was a driving force in the organisation of Shetland's first Folk Festival in 1981, and it's arguable that others took inspiration, and gave Shetland its accordion and fiddle festival, blues festival, guitar festival, its Fiddle Frenzy fiddle school and others, while fiddle tuition in schools led to guitar, woodwind, brass, percussion, and accordion tuition. His royalties fund the Shetland Musical Heritage Trust, whose object is to further Tom's ambitions in preserving and enhancing Shetland's musical tradition and culture. The Trust, which holds his copyrights, engaged the Hardie Press to publish over 200 of Tom's tunes that had not been published at the time of his death. They were published in three volumes, each entitled The Tom Anderson Collection.

In 2010 Anderson was posthumously inducted into the Scottish Traditional Music Hall of Fame.

== Discography ==
In 2009 Soldier's Joy from The Silver Bow with Aly Bain was included in Topic Records 70 year anniversary boxed set Three Score and Ten as track seven on the fourth CD.

- The Silver Bow, Topic TSCD469 (1993, with Aly Bain)
