= Esha Ness =

Scottish peninsula

Coordinates: 60.49°N 1.59°W

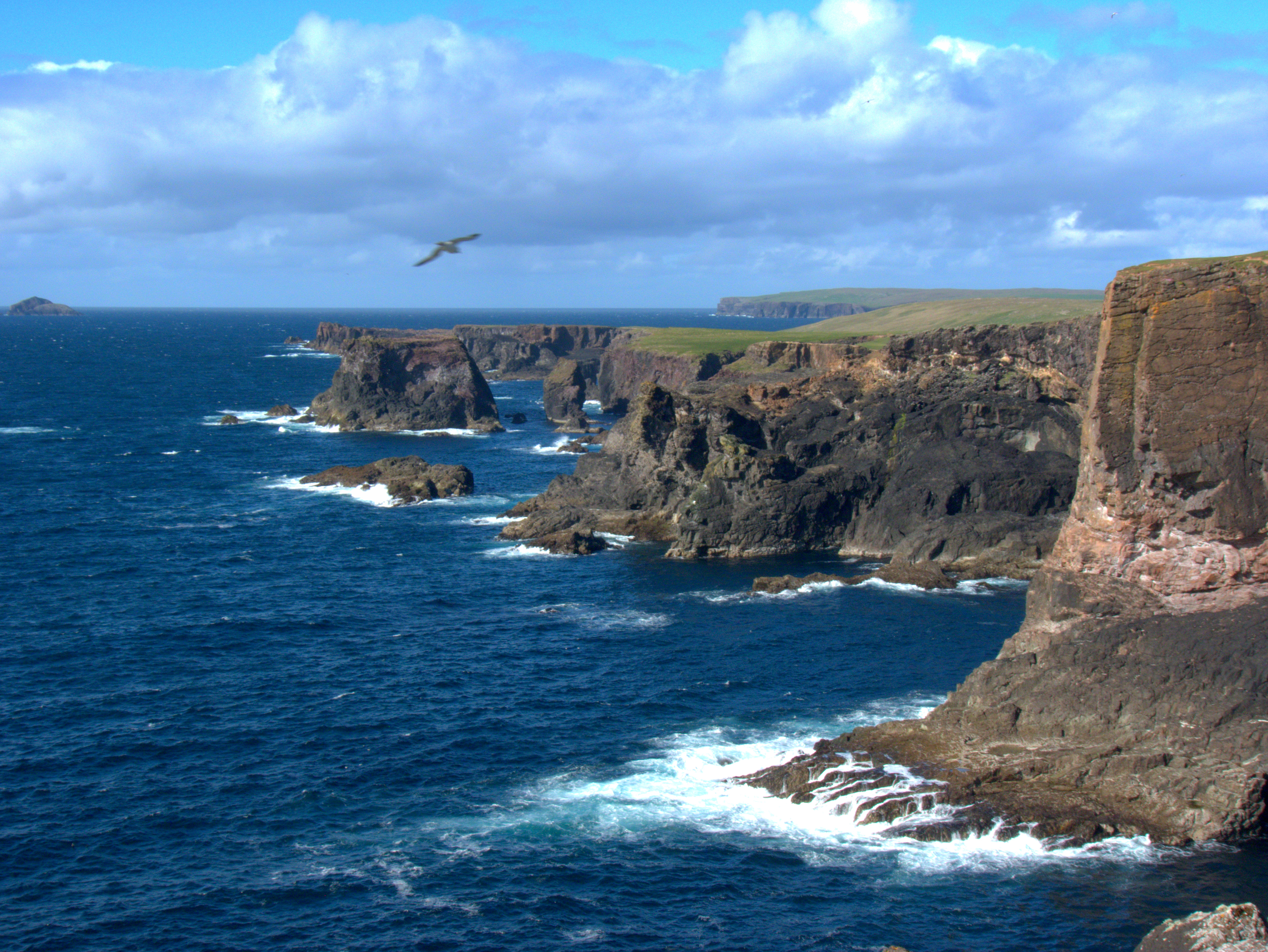
Eshaness Cliffs

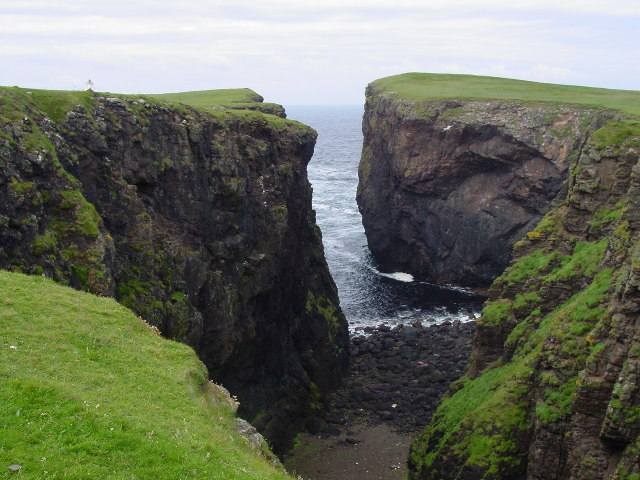
Calder's Geo

Esha Ness, also written Eshaness (Shaetlan pronunciation: [ˈeːʃnəs] AYSH-nəs), is a peninsula on the west coast of Northmavine, on the island of Mainland, Shetland, Scotland. Esha Ness Lighthouse is located on the west coast of the peninsula, just south of Calder's Geo. The lighthouse was designed by David Alan Stevenson and commissioned in 1929. The hamlet of Tangwick contains the Tangwick Haa, a former Laird's house that has been a museum since 1987.

== Geology ==
Esha Ness and the surrounding rocks are the remnants of a stratovolcano, which was active around 395 million years ago. The rocks testify that eruptions were violent and explosive, with the ignimbrite of Grind o da Navir being a deposit from pyroclastic flows. The island of Muckle Ossa is what remains of the main vent of the Esha Ness volcano, while Kirn o Slettans is a side-vent.

== Geography ==
Esha Ness is on the west coast of Northmavine on the island of Mainland, Shetland. It lies to the northwest of St Magnus Bay, to the north of Papa Stour. There are several small settlements in the peninsula, including Stenness and Tangwick in the south, Braewick and Braehoulland in the east, and Ure near the north coast. The principal road running through the peninsula is the B9078 road which passes near Braewick and West Heogaland to the coast, ending at Stenness. Calder's Geo is a large geo that cuts into the western black volcanic cliffs of Esha Ness. To the north of the geo is a sea cave that has been measured at more than one and a half times the size of "Frozen Deep", a chamber in Reservoir Hole under Cheddar Gorge in Somerset, potentially making it the largest natural chamber in Britain.

There are numerous blowholes in the vicinity, notably the Holes of Scraada in a cleft where the sea appears about 300 yards from the cliff line on the west coast. There are also a number of giant boulder fields along the cliffsides, with rocks deposited from the cliffs during storms, and various islands offshore from Esha Ness including Dore Holm, the Isle of Stenness, and the Skerry of Eshaness, a small island about 1,200 yards off the south coast. About two and a half miles from the small inlet of Hamna Voe is Ossa Skerry.

== Landmarks ==
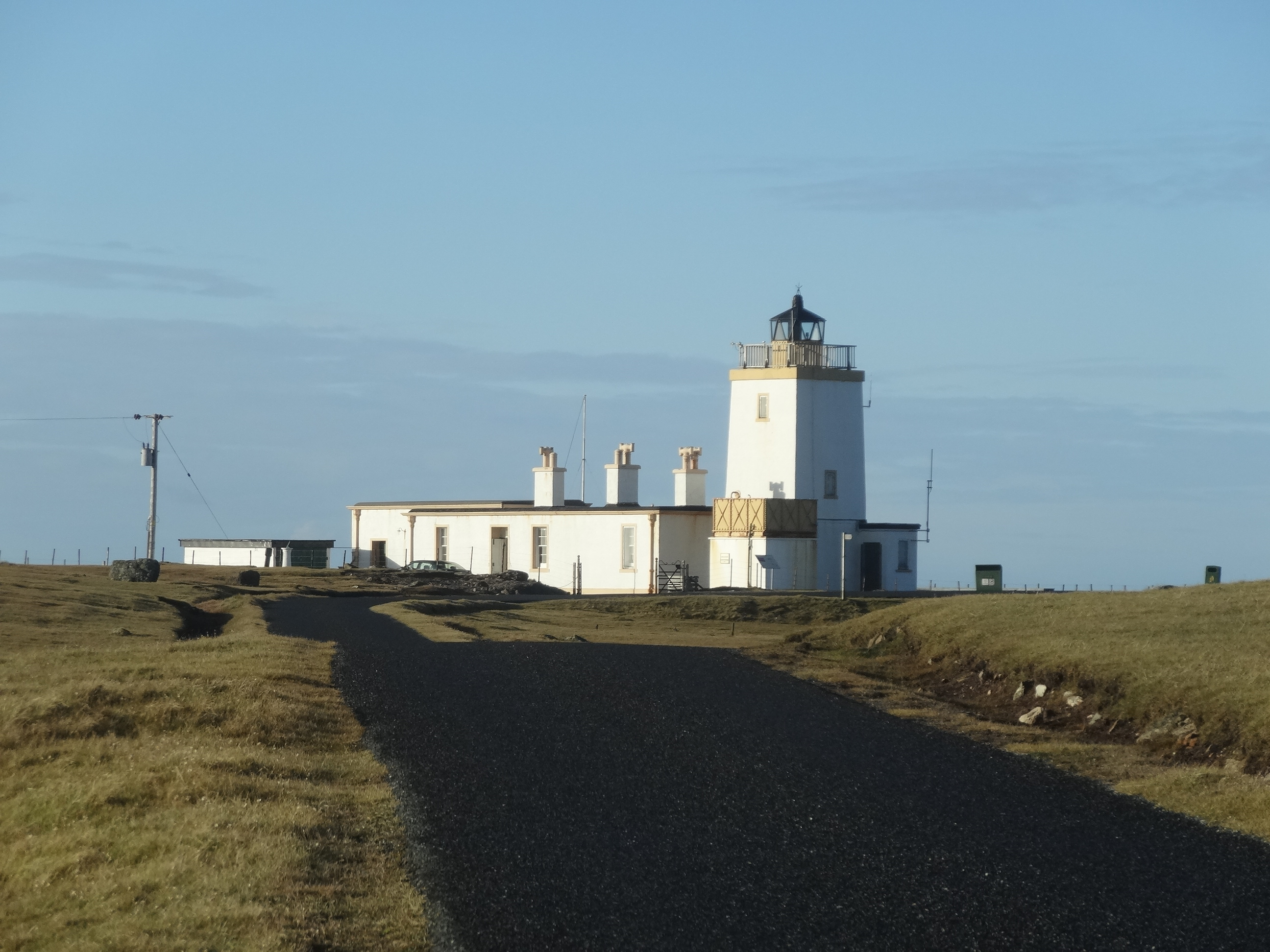
Esha Ness Lighthouse

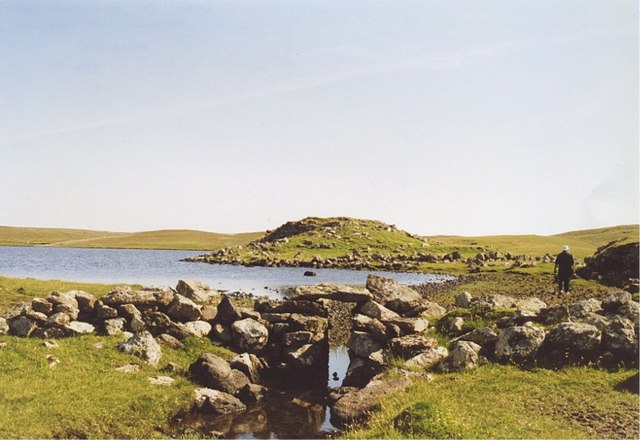
Broch of the Loch of Houlland

Esha Ness Lighthouse on the west coast, just south of Calder's Geo, was designed by David Alan Stevenson and commissioned in 1929. The power of the Atlantic Ocean storms is displayed at the Grind o Da Navir, a large amphitheatre just north of the Eshaness lighthouse that opens out through a breach in the cliffs. Here, the waves have thrown rocks of up to 3 metres (9.8 ft) high over 15 metres (49 ft) above the sea.

Cross Kirk Cemetery lies near the Loch of Breckon, with the graves of physician John Williamson (Johnnie Notions), with a stone of mixed Roman and Runic inscriptions, and the grave of Donald Robertson with epitaphs. Sae Breck Broch, partially excavated by Charles S. T. Calder in 1949, is about 200 metres (660 ft) up a steep hill to the west of the cemetery, and contains the remains of a coast guard watchtower. About 1 kilometre (0.62 mi) directly east of here is the site of Hogaland Broch. The Broch of Houlland is on a large promontory on the Loch of Houlland, which has three rows of defensive walls. Also of note is March Cairn, a Neolithic square cairn overlooking Muckla Water. Excavated by Calder in 1949, it is 10 metres (33 ft) across and contains a cruciform chamber of about 1 metre (3 ft 3 in) in height, supported by large stones. Two pottery sherds, two stone discs and a quartz tool were unearthed at the site. Muckla Water square cairn is about 250 metres (820 ft) east-northeast of the site.

The hamlet of Tangwick contains the Tangwick Haa Museum. The house belonged to the Cheyne family, who were the Lairds of Tangwick. The last Laird, John Cheyne VIII, died in 1840 and it was left to the caretaker. After a long period of neglect, functioning as a workshop, it was highlighted for restoration by the Shetland Amenity Trust in 1985 and opened as a museum in 1987.
