= Shetland Fiddlers' Society =

Group of fiddlers from Shetland

The Shetland Fiddlers' Society is a group of fiddlers from Shetland that play regularly for Shetland Folk Dance and perform at events such as Shetland's Folk Festival and Accordion and Fiddle Festival.

The society had its origin in May 1960, when the first big post-war social event organized in Shetland took place. Known as the Hamefarin, it was an organized return trip to their native isles made by some 150 Shetlanders who had emigrated and settled worldwide in such countries as Australia, New Zealand, Canada and the USA. A week of social events of all kinds was laid on for the visitors at venues throughout the islands, and among the main attractions were a Grand Variety Concert and a Shetland Concert, each staged on two evenings in the Garrison Theatre, Lerwick.

The opening act of each concert was a performance by forty 'massed fiddlers', players from all over the Shetland mainland gathered together by Tom Anderson and trained by him over the preceding winter months. The group's performances of traditional Shetland fiddle tunes were so well received that it was inundated by requests to perform all over Shetland and invited to play for Her Majesty Queen Elizabeth II during a royal visit planned for August. As a consequence, the fiddlers formed themselves into Shetland Fiddlers' Society on 29 June 1960, with Tom Anderson as its Leader. Magnus Magnusson, then a reporter on the ‘Scotsman’ newspaper sent to cover the Royal visit, gave the Society its affectionate nickname "Da Forty Fiddlers", which stuck for many years until player numbers dwindled somewhat.

The objectives of the Society include:

- the preservation, development and presentation for the benefit, education and enjoyment of the public of the traditional art of Shetland fiddle playing
- to give concerts recitals and other public appearance of Shetland fiddle music for the benefit, education and enjoyment of the public
- to educate musicians in the traditional art of Shetland Fiddle playing'.

Tom Anderson left the Society in 1980 but Shetland Fiddlers' Society still thrives, meeting weekly for practice. To mark its 50th anniversary in 2010, a tunebook "50 Years of the Shetland Fiddlers' Society" (The Fiddle Frenzy Collection Volume 5,10th Aniversary Edition) was produced, featuring their tune sets from the seven earlier recordings.

== Discography ==
- Da 40 Fiddlers Entertain (1964)
- Shetland Fiddlers On Stage - Vol. 1 (1976)
- Shetland Fiddlers Vol. 2 (1978)
- Welcome To The Hamefarin : Shetland Fiddlers Vol. 3 (1985)
- Come Again – You’re Welcome! (1993)
- Eenie's Spring (1996)
- Da Bride's a Bonny Ting (2004)
- Da Reel Thing (2014)

Compilation

- 50 Years Of The Shetland Fiddlers' Society (2013) from the seven earlier recordings (as same as 2010 tunebook)

Other

- Shetland Fiddlers (1973;re-released in 2002) compilation album with the recordings of The Cullivoe Traditional Players, Tom Anderson & Aly Bain, etc.
