= John Cheyne (advocate) =

Scottish judge (1841–1907)

Sir John Cheyne of Tangwick KC LLD (1841–1907) was a 19th/20th century Scottish judge.

== Life ==
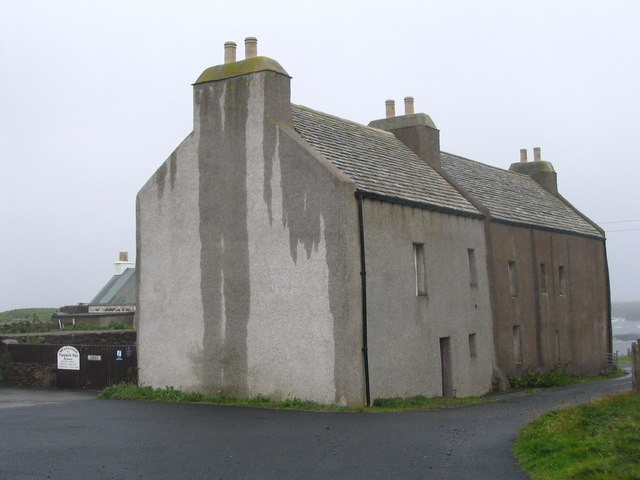
Tangwick Haa - now a museum

He was born on 15 February 1841 at 5 Walker Street in Edinburgh's West End the son of Henry Walker WS. He was christened at Northmavine parish church in Shetland near his father's home estate of Tangwick Haa which was built by his family around 1690.

By 1851 the family was living at 6 Royal Terrace on Calton Hill.

He was sent to Trinity College, Oxford to study law, graduating MA. He passed the Scottish bar as an Advocate in May 1865. He mainly practiced in Dundee. In the 1880s he was living at 7 Airlie Place in Dundee. Airlie Place is a handsome mid-19th century townhouse forming part of a terrace stepping down towards the River Tay. He was at this stage also Sheriff Substitute for Forfarshire.

From 1891 he was also Procurator to the General Assembly of the Church of Scotland and Vice Dean of the Faculty of Advocates.

He became Sheriff of Ross, Cromarty and Sutherland in 1886, transferring to be Sheriff of Renfrew and Bute in 1889, serving until his death.

He was knighted by Queen Victoria at Balmoral Castle in 1897.

He lived his final years at 13 Chester Street in Edinburgh's West End. He was a member of the Kirk Session under Rev Archibald Scott at St George's Church on Charlotte Square.

He died on 15 January 1907. He is buried in Warriston Cemetery. His simple marble cross stands on the north side of the main central east–west path. The Tangwick estate in Shetland (in which he showed little interest) passed to his younger brother Harry Cheyne.

== Family ==
Cheyne married twice: firstly in 1871 to Margaret Simson (1846-1872) who died soon after childbirth, who lived initially with the whole Cheyne family at 12 Albany Street; secondly in 1875 at Inchture to Mary Isabella Edward (born 1847 in Dundee; died 1931).

He had one daughter by the first marriage and two by the second.
