= List of listed buildings in Sandsting =

This is a list of listed buildings in the parish of Sandsting in Mainland, Shetland, Scotland.

== List ==
Name	Location	Date Listed	Grid Ref. (Note: Sometimes known as OSGB36, the grid reference (where provided) is based on the British national grid reference system used by the Ordnance Survey. • "Guide to National Grid". Ordnance Survey. • "Get-a-map". Ordnance Survey.)	Geo-coordinates	Notes	LB Number (Note: Historic Environment Scotland assign a unique alphanumeric identifier to each designated site in Scotland, for listed buildings this always begins with "LB", for example "LB12345".)	Image
Aith, Aith Church (Church Of Scotland) And Manse, Including Boundary Walls, Railings, Gates And Gatepiers				60°17′01″N 1°22′36″W	Category C(S)	44566	Upload Photo
Sand, Haa Of Sand Bod, Slipway, And Cottage				60°12′29″N 1°22′35″W	Category B	44571	Upload Photo
Tresta, Tresta House And Post Office, Including Outbuildings, Well, Garden And Retaining Walls, Gates, And Gatepiers				60°14′32″N 1°20′47″W	Category C(S)	44572	Upload Photo
Vementry, Vementry Clack Mill				60°19′13″N 1°26′13″W	Category B	18818	Upload Photo
Reawick, Reawick House And Steading, Including Walls And Outbuilding				60°11′01″N 1°24′31″W	Category B	18695	Upload another image See more images
Tresta, Telephone Kiosk				60°14′33″N 1°20′47″W	Category B	44573	Upload Photo
Semblister, Semblister Old Kirk				60°14′11″N 1°23′28″W	Category B	19901	Upload Photo
Sand, Haa Of Sand, Including Walled Gardens, Outbuildings, Entrance Gatepiers, Cottage, Boundary Walls And Gatepiers				60°12′25″N 1°22′51″W	Category A	18693	Upload Photo
Reawick, Reawick Congregational Church				60°11′12″N 1°25′54″W	Category C(S)	18694	Upload Photo
Easter Skeld, The Steamer				60°11′14″N 1°26′22″W	Category C(S)	44569	Upload Photo
Tresta, Sandsound, The Store, Including Sea Wall, Piers, Slipways, And Fishhouse				60°13′24″N 1°21′49″W	Category B	18698	Upload Photo
Sand, St Mary's Chapel Chancel Arch, Including Graveyard Wall				60°12′28″N 1°22′35″W	Category C(S)	18697	Upload Photo
Reawick, Reawick House Watermill				60°10′55″N 1°24′29″W	Category B	44570	Upload Photo
Bixter, Park Hall, Including Gatepiers				60°15′26″N 1°26′13″W	Category C(S)	44567	Upload Photo

== Key ==
The scheme for classifying buildings in Scotland is:

- Category A: "buildings of national or international importance, either architectural or historic; or fine, little-altered examples of some particular period, style or building type."
- Category B: "buildings of regional or more than local importance; or major examples of some particular period, style or building type, which may have been altered."
- Category C: "buildings of local importance; lesser examples of any period, style, or building type, as originally constructed or moderately altered; and simple traditional buildings which group well with other listed buildings."

In March 2016 there were 47,288 listed buildings in Scotland. Of these, 8% were Category A, and 50% were Category B, with the remaining 42% being Category C.
