= Gunnister =

Coordinates: 60.4510°N 1.4196°W

Gunnister (Shaetlan pronunciation: [ˈgɔnistər] GUN-ee-stər) is a small 'abandoned' village at the North-West Mainland in Shetland, Scotland. It is most commonly known for the Gunnister Man - the remains of a man from the late 17th century which were found by peat cutters in a peat bog not far from the junction of A970 road.

The name Gunnister has been suggested to stem from the Old Norse/Old Norwegian *Gunna-setr.
