= List of listed buildings in Delting, Shetland Islands =

This is a list of listed buildings in the parish of Delting in the Shetland Islands, Scotland.

== List ==
| Name | Location | Date Listed | Grid Ref. (Note: Sometimes known as OSGB36, the grid reference (where provided) is based on the British national grid reference system used by the Ordnance Survey. • "Guide to National Grid". Ordnance Survey. • "Get-a-map". Ordnance Survey.) | Geo-coordinates | Notes | LB Number (Note: Historic Environment Scotland assign a unique alphanumeric identifier to each designated site in Scotland, for listed buildings this always begins with "LB", for example "LB12345".) | Image |
|---|---|---|---|---|---|---|---|
| Brae, Voxter House (Now Voxter Centre), Including Walled Garden | | | | 60°24′42″N 1°19′41″W | Category B | 44526 | Upload another image |
| Voe, Pier And Pier Buildings | | | | 60°21′02″N 1°15′58″W | Category B | 44535 | Upload another image |
| Grobsness, Grobsness Haa, Including Walls And Outbuildings | | | | 60°21′09″N 1°20′01″W | Category B | 44528 | Upload another image |
| Mossbank, Mossbank Bod | | | | 60°27′14″N 1°10′38″W | Category C(S) | 44530 | Upload Photo |
| Swinister, Swinister Old Haa, Including Wall | | | | 60°26′05″N 1°11′06″W | Category B | 44534 | Upload Photo |
| Voe, Voe House, Including Garden Wall And Gatepiers | | | | 60°20′58″N 1°16′01″W | Category B | 44536 | Upload Photo |
| Brae, Busta House, Including Garden Walls, Steps, Gates And Gatepiers, Boathouse, Harbour And Slipway, And Doocot | | | | 60°23′07″N 1°22′17″W | Category B | 5887 | Upload another image See more images |
| Voe, Old Olnafirth Kirk, Including Kirkyard Wall, Gatepiers, And Enclosures | | | | 60°21′16″N 1°16′05″W | Category B | 5888 | Upload another image |
| Mossbank, Mossbank Lighthouse | | | | 60°27′13″N 1°10′37″W | Category C(S) | 44532 | Upload another image |
| Mossbank, Mossbank Haa, Including Outbuildings And Wall | | | | 60°27′42″N 1°10′56″W | Category C(S) | 44531 | Upload another image |
| Brae, Brae House, With Pier And Outbuildings | | | | 60°23′34″N 1°21′07″W | Category B | 5271 | Upload Photo |
| Garth, Pony Pund, Including Gates, And Adjoining Outbuildings | | | | 60°27′10″N 1°15′24″W | Category B | 44527 | Upload Photo |
| Mossbank, Erlangen Including Garden Wall | | | | 60°27′42″N 1°11′00″W | Category C(S) | 44529 | Upload Photo |
| Swinster, Pony Pund | | | | 60°25′53″N 1°11′47″W | Category B | 44533 | Upload Photo |

== Key ==
The scheme for classifying buildings in Scotland is:

- Category A: "buildings of national or international importance, either architectural or historic; or fine, little-altered examples of some particular period, style or building type."
- Category B: "buildings of regional or more than local importance; or major examples of some particular period, style or building type, which may have been altered."
- Category C: "buildings of local importance; lesser examples of any period, style, or building type, as originally constructed or moderately altered; and simple traditional buildings which group well with other listed buildings."

In March 2016 there were 47,288 listed buildings in Scotland. Of these, 8% were Category A, and 50% were Category B, with the remaining 42% being Category C.
