= List of listed buildings in Yell, Shetland Islands =

This is a list of listed buildings in the parish of Yell in the Shetland Islands, Scotland.

== List ==
Name	Location	Date Listed	Grid Ref. (Note: Sometimes known as OSGB36, the grid reference (where provided) is based on the British national grid reference system used by the Ordnance Survey. • "Guide to National Grid". Ordnance Survey. • "Get-a-map". Ordnance Survey.)	Geo-coordinates	Notes	LB Number (Note: Historic Environment Scotland assign a unique alphanumeric identifier to each designated site in Scotland, for listed buildings this always begins with "LB", for example "LB12345".)	Image
Camb, Seafield Pier, Including Sea Wall And Noosts				60°36′37″N 1°04′07″W	Category C(S)	45316	Upload Photo
Mid Yell, Lussetter (Formerly Mid Yell Manse), Including Pavilions And Boundary Walls				60°35′47″N 1°03′13″W	Category B	18647	Upload Photo
Burravoe, Old Haa Of Brough, Including Walls				60°29′45″N 1°03′19″W	Category B	18680	Upload Photo
Cullivoe, Moarfield Mill				60°42′37″N 1°01′07″W	Category C(S)	45317	Upload Photo
Mid Yell, St John's (Mid Yell) Kirk (Church Of Scotland), Including Church Hall And Churchyard Wall				60°35′49″N 1°03′39″W	Category C(S)	18646	Upload another image
Hamnavoe, St Magnus (South Yell) Kirk (Church Of Scotland), Including Graveyard Walls And Post Box				60°30′15″N 1°06′05″W	Category B	18678	Upload Photo
Greenbank, Braeside Old School, Including Wall				60°42′47″N 1°01′33″W	Category C(S)	45318	Upload Photo
West Yell, West Yell Schoolhouse, Including Playground And Garden Walls, And Toilet Buildings				60°31′33″N 1°10′26″W	Category C(S)	45325	Upload Photo
Windhouse, Including Terrace And Garden Walls, And Ha-Ha				60°36′27″N 1°06′33″W	Category C(S)	45326	Upload another image
Burravoe, Manor House, Including Steps, Outbuilding, Boathouse, Pier, Noost And Slip, Entrance Gates, And Gatepiers, Boundary, Garden And Sea Walls,				60°29′44″N 1°02′52″W	Category C(S)	45311	Upload Photo
Camb, Seafield, Including Garden Walls				60°36′39″N 1°04′06″W	Category C(S)	45315	Upload Photo
Mid Yell, Haa Of Gardie, Including Ancillary Structures And Walls				60°36′12″N 1°04′24″W	Category C(S)	45322	Upload Photo
Windhouse Farmhouse, Steading And Mill, Including W Barn				60°36′28″N 1°06′16″W	Category B	45328	Upload Photo
Gloup, Gloup Haa, Including Garden Wall				60°43′16″N 1°04′22″W	Category B	18653	Upload Photo
Burravoe, St Colman's Episcopal Church				60°29′54″N 1°03′16″W	Category B	18681	Upload Photo
Burravoe, Shop And Former Booth				60°29′41″N 1°03′20″W	Category C(S)	45312	Upload Photo
Sellafirth, Sellafirth Kirk, Including Churchyard Wall And Gatepiers				60°39′59″N 1°03′24″W	Category C(S)	45324	Upload Photo
Cullivoe, St Olaf's (North Yell) Kirk (Church Of Scotland), Including Boundary Wall And Gatepiers				60°41′57″N 1°00′18″W	Category C(S)	18649	Upload Photo
Breakon, Sandwater Mills				60°43′20″N 1°02′27″W	Category C(S)	18652	Upload Photo
Gutcher, Telephone Kiosk				60°40′21″N 0°59′54″W	Category B	45319	Upload Photo
Mid Yell, Gardiestaing, Including Outbuildings				60°36′13″N 1°04′04″W	Category C(S)	45321	Upload Photo
West Sandwick, North Haa (West Sandwick House), Including Garden Walls, Gates And Gatepiers, Walled Garden, And Pier				60°34′22″N 1°11′20″W	Category A	18648	Upload Photo
Burravoe, Telephone Kiosk				60°29′41″N 1°03′21″W	Category B	45313	Upload Photo
Camb, Rooms O' Seafield, Including Store And Wall				60°36′39″N 1°04′07″W	Category C(S)	45314	Upload Photo
Sellafirth, Dalsetter Haa, Including Outbuilding				60°40′16″N 1°04′23″W	Category C(S)	45323	Upload Photo
Mid Yell, Linkshouse				60°35′51″N 1°03′32″W	Category C(S)	18986	Upload Photo
Ulsta, Pier House				60°29′49″N 1°09′32″W	Category C(S)	18679	Upload Photo
Kirkabister, Sheep Pund				60°38′22″N 1°00′54″W	Category B	45320	Upload Photo
Greenbank, Greenbank House, Including Shop, Outbuilding, Garden Walls And Piers, And Boundary Walls				60°42′58″N 1°00′52″W	Category B	18651	Upload Photo

== Key ==
The scheme for classifying buildings in Scotland is:

- Category A: "buildings of national or international importance, either architectural or historic; or fine, little-altered examples of some particular period, style or building type."
- Category B: "buildings of regional or more than local importance; or major examples of some particular period, style or building type, which may have been altered."
- Category C: "buildings of local importance; lesser examples of any period, style, or building type, as originally constructed or moderately altered; and simple traditional buildings which group well with other listed buildings."

In March 2016 there were 47,288 listed buildings in Scotland. Of these, 8% were Category A, and 50% were Category B, with the remaining 42% being Category C.
