= List of listed buildings in Unst =

This is a list of listed buildings in the parish of Unst in the Shetland Islands, Scotland.

== List ==
Name	Location	Date Listed	Grid Ref. (Note: Sometimes known as OSGB36, the grid reference (where provided) is based on the British national grid reference system used by the Ordnance Survey. • "Guide to National Grid". Ordnance Survey. • "Get-a-map". Ordnance Survey.)	Geo-coordinates	Notes	LB Number (Note: Historic Environment Scotland assign a unique alphanumeric identifier to each designated site in Scotland, for listed buildings this always begins with "LB", for example "LB12345".)	Image
Baltasound, St John's Church (Church Of Scotland), Including Church Hall, Boundary Walls, And Gatepiers				60°45′28″N 0°52′26″W	Category C(S)	45290	Upload Photo
Clivocast, Pier Buildings, Including Slipway				60°45′39″N 0°50′16″W	Category C(S)	45292	Upload Photo
Uyea, Uyea Haa, Including Terrace Wall, Outbuilding, Walled Garden, And Earl's Garden				60°40′07″N 0°53′44″W	Category C(S)	45298	Upload Photo
Lund, St Olaf's Chapel, Including Kirkyard Walls And Enclosure				60°42′57″N 0°57′46″W	Category B	17472	Upload Photo
Baliasta, Old Unst Manse, Including Garden Wall And Steading				60°45′43″N 0°52′58″W	Category C(S)	17480	Upload Photo
Baltasound, Hagdale Horse-Mill				60°46′13″N 0°49′34″W	Category B	45287	Upload Photo
Burrafirth, Muckle Flugga Lighthouse Shore Station, Including Former Accommodation Block, Cottage, Wall And Sundial, South Cottage And Steps, Store, Slipway And Derrick, Water Cistern, Garden And Boundary Walls, And Gatepiers				60°48′43″N 0°52′27″W	Category C(S)	45291	Upload Photo
Houlland Steading, Including Retaining Wall And Gatepier				60°46′22″N 0°54′24″W	Category C(S)	45294	Upload Photo
Uyeasound, Uyeasound Kirk (Church Of Scotland), Including Boundary Wall And Gatepiers				60°41′19″N 0°54′08″W	Category B	45300	Upload Photo
Westing, Kirk Knowe Mill				60°43′48″N 0°57′13″W	Category B	17473	Upload Photo
Belmont, Belmont House, Including Quadrant Links, Pavilions, Terrace Walls, Farm Cottage And Steading, Boundary Walls, And Booth				60°41′18″N 0°58′02″W	Category A	17474	Upload another image
Baliasta, Hillside Free Church And Manse, Including Outbuildings, Planticrub, Boundary And Garden Walls, And Gatepiers				60°45′41″N 0°53′31″W	Category B	45286	Upload Photo
Uyea, Uyea Chapel, Including Memorial, Table Tombstone, And Graveyard Wall				60°39′55″N 0°53′20″W	Category B	17471	Upload Photo
Muness, Muness Castle, Including Boundary Wall				60°41′19″N 0°50′57″W	Category A	17476	Upload another image
Norwick, The Banks, Including Cottage, Outbuilding, Ruin, Boundary And Sea Walls				60°48′38″N 0°48′16″W	Category C(S)	45295	Upload Photo
Baltasound, Oredaal House, Including Outbuilding And Garden Wall				60°45′06″N 0°50′35″W	Category C(S)	45288	Upload Photo
Baltasound, Oredale Steading, Including Threshing Mill, Pigsty, Lade, Stackyard, And Boundary Walls				60°45′01″N 0°50′27″W	Category B	45289	Upload Photo
Haroldswick, The Hamars, Including Steading, And Garden And Boundary Walls				60°47′19″N 0°49′45″W	Category B	45293	Upload Photo
Papil, Valsgarth, Including Outbuildings And Walls				60°47′37″N 0°48′59″W	Category B	45296	Upload Photo
Uyeasound, Pierfront Buildings And Shop				60°41′19″N 0°55′03″W	Category C(S)	45299	Upload Photo
Uyeasound, Greenwell's Booth				60°41′19″N 0°55′04″W	Category C(S)	17475	Upload another image
Skaw, Boat-Roofed Shed				60°49′30″N 0°47′28″W	Category C(S)	45297	Upload Photo
Baliasta, Old Unst Kirk (Church Of Scotland), Including Memorial Enclosures, Kirkyard Wall And Gatepiers				60°45′53″N 0°53′45″W	Category C(S)	17477	Upload another image
Baltasound, Buness House, Including Terrace Wall, Garden And Boundary Walls, Gates And Gatepiers, Former Boat House, Stable, Coach House, Noost And Pier				60°45′33″N 0°50′54″W	Category B	17478	Upload Photo
Muckle Flugga, North Unst Lighthouse, Including Fog Horn House, Boundary Wall, Steps, And Outbuilding				60°51′19″N 0°53′07″W	Category A	17479	Upload another image

== Key ==
The scheme for classifying buildings in Scotland is:

- Category A: "buildings of national or international importance, either architectural or historic; or fine, little-altered examples of some particular period, style or building type."
- Category B: "buildings of regional or more than local importance; or major examples of some particular period, style or building type, which may have been altered."
- Category C: "buildings of local importance; lesser examples of any period, style, or building type, as originally constructed or moderately altered; and simple traditional buildings which group well with other listed buildings."

In March 2016 there were 47,288 listed buildings in Scotland. Of these, 8% were Category A, and 50% were Category B, with the remaining 42% being Category C.
