= List of listed buildings in Walls and Sandness, Shetland Islands =

This is a list of listed buildings in the parish of Walls and Sandness in West Mainland, Shetland, Scotland.

== List ==
Name	Location	Date Listed	Grid Ref. (Note: Sometimes known as OSGB36, the grid reference (where provided) is based on the British national grid reference system used by the Ordnance Survey. • "Guide to National Grid". Ordnance Survey. • "Get-a-map". Ordnance Survey.)	Geo-coordinates	Notes	LB Number (Note: Historic Environment Scotland assign a unique alphanumeric identifier to each designated site in Scotland, for listed buildings this always begins with "LB", for example "LB12345".)	Image
Burrastow, Burrastow Mill, Including Steps				60°12′46″N 1°35′57″W	Category B	45302	Upload Photo
Lera Voe Mills, Including Footbridge				60°13′12″N 1°36′46″W	Category C(S)	19895	Upload Photo
Huxter, Huxter Mills, Including Footbridges And Dam				60°17′54″N 1°41′22″W	Category B	18631	Upload Photo
Foula, Haa of Foula				60°08′04″N 2°02′53″W	Category C(S)	18608	Upload Photo
Walls, Haa of Bayhall, Including Garden Wall, Outbuilding, Pier And Slipway				60°13′40″N 1°33′48″W	Category B	18609	Upload Photo
Burrastow, Burrastow Cottage				60°12′51″N 1°35′56″W	Category C(S)	45301	Upload Photo
Walls, Burnside, Including Byre, Telephone Kiosk, Garden And Sea Walls, And Outbuilding				60°13′41″N 1°34′02″W	Category C(S)	45306	Upload Photo
Walls, Lower Springfield, Including Store And Garden Walls				60°13′40″N 1°33′50″W	Category B	45307	Upload Photo
Foula, War Memorial				60°07′42″N 2°02′48″W	Category C(S)	45303	Upload another image
Vaila, Vaila Tower				60°12′18″N 1°36′10″W	Category B	18607	Upload Photo
Walls, Walls Methodist Church, Including Churchyard Walls, Railings, Gates, And Gatepiers				60°13′49″N 1°33′42″W	Category C(S)	45309	Upload Photo
Sandness, St Margaret's Kirk, Including Graveyard Wall And Gatepiers				60°18′09″N 1°39′20″W	Category B	18628	Upload Photo
Melby, North House, Including Walls				60°18′17″N 1°39′52″W	Category B	18630	Upload Photo
Vaila, Vaila Hall, Including Retaining And Garden Walls, Gates, And Gatepiers				60°12′21″N 1°35′37″W	Category B	18634	Upload Photo
Burrastow, Burrastow House, Including Walled Garden, Sea Wall, And Gatepiers				60°12′50″N 1°35′57″W	Category C(S)	18611	Upload Photo
Huxter, Smithfield Croft, Including Kailyard Wall				60°18′01″N 1°40′52″W	Category B	45304	Upload Photo
Melby, Melby House, Including Garden Walls And Gatepiers				60°18′15″N 1°39′52″W	Category B	18629	Upload Photo
Papa Stour, Hamna Voe, Horizontal Mills				60°19′46″N 1°42′22″W	Category C(S)	18633	Upload Photo
Vaila, Cloudin Farmhouse, Including Outbuildings And Walls				60°12′32″N 1°35′05″W	Category B	45305	Upload Photo
Walls, Walls Methodist Church Manse, Including Boundary Walls				60°13′49″N 1°33′43″W	Category C(S)	45310	Upload Photo
Walls, Seafield				60°13′40″N 1°33′51″W	Category C(S)	45308	Upload Photo
Papa Stour, Papa Stour Kirk, Including Kirkyard Wall				60°19′27″N 1°40′52″W	Category B	18632	Upload Photo
Walls, Voe House				60°13′39″N 1°34′12″W	Category B	18610	Upload Photo

== Key ==
The scheme for classifying buildings in Scotland is:

- Category A: "buildings of national or international importance, either architectural or historic; or fine, little-altered examples of some particular period, style or building type."
- Category B: "buildings of regional or more than local importance; or major examples of some particular period, style or building type, which may have been altered."
- Category C: "buildings of local importance; lesser examples of any period, style, or building type, as originally constructed or moderately altered; and simple traditional buildings which group well with other listed buildings."

In March 2016 there were 47,288 listed buildings in Scotland. Of these, 8% were Category A, and 50% were Category B, with the remaining 42% being Category C.
