= List of listed buildings in Fetlar, Shetland Islands =

This is a list of listed buildings in the parish of Fetlar in the Shetland Islands, Scotland.

== List ==
Name	Location	Date Listed	Grid Ref. (Note: Sometimes known as OSGB36, the grid reference (where provided) is based on the British national grid reference system used by the Ordnance Survey. • "Guide to National Grid". Ordnance Survey. • "Get-a-map". Ordnance Survey.)	Geo-coordinates	Notes	LB Number (Note: Historic Environment Scotland assign a unique alphanumeric identifier to each designated site in Scotland, for listed buildings this always begins with "LB", for example "LB12345".)	Image
Smithfield, Including Pavilions, Walls, Byre, Store, And Booth				60°36′06″N 0°47′52″W	Category C(S)	45271	Upload Photo
Fetlar, Leagarth House Including Hall, Walled Garden And Gatepiers				60°35′34″N 0°51′25″W	Category C(S)	51161	Upload Photo
The Glebe, Including Steading, Walls, Railings And Gatepiers				60°35′41″N 0°53′24″W	Category C(S)	12677	Upload Photo
Fetlar Kirk, Including Kirkyard Wall And Monument				60°35′37″N 0°53′34″W	Category B	12679	Upload Photo
Brough Lodge, Including Courtyard Entrance Gateway And Outbuilding, Screen Wall And, Pavilion, Tower Folly, Terrace Walls, Steps And Gatepiers, Walled Garden, Walls And Outbuildings, And Well-Head				60°36′45″N 0°56′32″W	Category A	45269	Upload another image
Gruting, Round House				60°35′56″N 0°49′09″W	Category C(S)	45270	Upload Photo
Aith, Aithbank, Including Byres, Stable, Boundary And Kailyard Walls				60°35′17″N 0°49′45″W	Category B	12678	Upload Photo

== Key ==
The scheme for classifying buildings in Scotland is:

- Category A: "buildings of national or international importance, either architectural or historic; or fine, little-altered examples of some particular period, style or building type."
- Category B: "buildings of regional or more than local importance; or major examples of some particular period, style or building type, which may have been altered."
- Category C: "buildings of local importance; lesser examples of any period, style, or building type, as originally constructed or moderately altered; and simple traditional buildings which group well with other listed buildings."

In March 2016 there were 47,288 listed buildings in Scotland. Of these, 8% were Category A, and 50% were Category B, with the remaining 42% being Category C.
