= Geo (landform) =

Inlet, a gully or a narrow and deep cleft in the face of a cliff

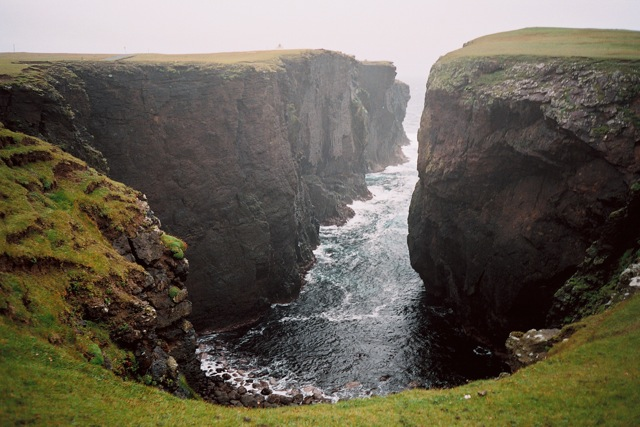
Calder's Geo, Shetland

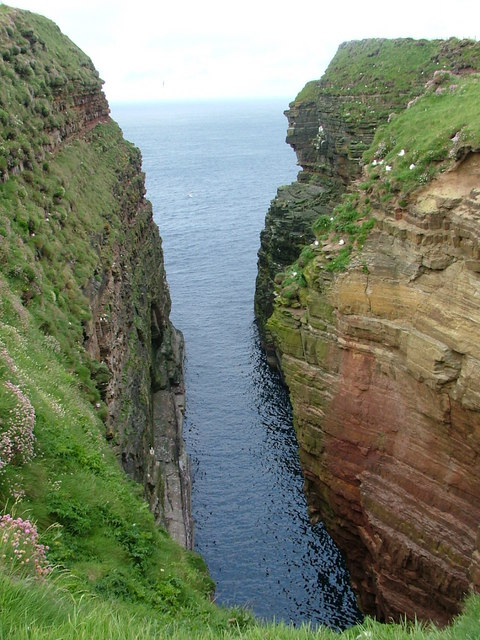
Geo of Sclaites at Duncansby Head, Caithness

A geo or gio (Shaetlan pronunciation: [ɡjoː] GYOH, from Old Norse gjá) is an inlet, a gully or a narrow and deep cleft in the face of a cliff. Geos are common on the coastline of the Shetland and Orkney islands. They are created by the wave driven erosion of cliffs along faults and bedding planes in the rock. Geos may have sea caves at their heads. Such sea caves may collapse, extending the geo, or leaving depressions inland from the geo. Geos can also be created from this process.

== See also ==
- Gjógv, a place in the Faroes
- List of places in Orkney
- Sea cave
