= List of listed buildings in Bressay =

This is a list of listed buildings in the parish of Bressay, in Shetland, Scotland.

== List ==
Name	Location	Date listed	Grid ref. (Note: Sometimes known as OSGB36, the grid reference (where provided) is based on the British national grid reference system used by the Ordnance Survey. • "Guide to National Grid". Ordnance Survey. • "Get-a-map". Ordnance Survey.)	Geo-coordinates	Notes	LB number (Note: Historic Environment Scotland assign a unique alphanumeric identifier to each designated site in Scotland, for listed buildings this always begins with "LB", for example "LB12345".)	Image
Gardie House Pier				60°09′35″N 1°07′29″W	Category B	44520	Upload Photo
Heogan, Former Fishing Station, Including House, Stores, Barrel Store, Wall And Pier				60°10′24″N 1°08′48″W	Category B	44524	Upload Photo
Swarthoull Old Schoolhouse, Including Boundary Walls				60°09′42″N 1°04′51″W	Category C(S)	6587	Upload Photo
Gardie House Cottage, Including Outbuilding And Garden Walls				60°09′39″N 1°07′26″W	Category B	5881	Upload Photo
Bressay Lighthouse, Including Keeper's Accommodation, Toilet Block, Engine House, Oil Tanks, Horn House, Stores, Boundary Wall And Gatepiers				60°07′13″N 1°07′18″W	Category B	5882	Upload Photo
Gardie House, Including Garden And Boundary Walls, Pavilions, Gates, And Gatepiers				60°09′36″N 1°07′23″W	Category A	5880	Upload another image
Bressay Kirk (Church Of Scotland), Including Kirkyard Wall				60°09′02″N 1°06′49″W	Category B	5877	Upload Photo
Gunnista Graveyard, Including Burial Enclosure And Boundary Wall				60°10′29″N 1°05′53″W	Category B	44523	Upload Photo
Gardie House Steading				60°09′38″N 1°07′22″W	Category B	44521	Upload Photo
The Glebe, Including Barn, Kiln, Outbuilding And Boundary Walls				60°08′43″N 1°06′45″W	Category B	44522	Upload Photo
Noss, Gungstie Farmhouse, Including Pit Pony Pund, Kiln And Boundary Walls				60°09′00″N 1°02′45″W	Category B	6586	Upload Photo
Maryfield House, Including Boundary Walls And Gatepiers				60°09′42″N 1°07′03″W	Category C(S)	5879	Upload Photo
Maryfield, Boat Store And Slipway, Including Wall, Retaining Wall And Steps				60°09′26″N 1°07′18″W	Category B	44525	Upload Photo
Mizpah House, Including Outbuildings, Boundary Walls, Railings And Gate				60°08′51″N 1°06′51″W	Category C(S)	5878	Upload Photo

== Key ==
The scheme for classifying buildings in Scotland is:

- Category A: "buildings of national or international importance, either architectural or historic; or fine, little-altered examples of some particular period, style or building type."
- Category B: "buildings of regional or more than local importance; or major examples of some particular period, style or building type, which may have been altered."
- Category C: "buildings of local importance; lesser examples of any period, style, or building type, as originally constructed or moderately altered; and simple traditional buildings which group well with other listed buildings."

In March 2016 there were 47,288 listed buildings in Scotland. Of these, 8% were Category A, and 50% were Category B, with the remaining 42% being Category C.
