= Park Hall, Shetland =

Derelict country house in Shetland, Scotland

Coordinates: 60°15′26″N 1°26′11″W

Park Hall is a derelict laird's house situated west of the village of Bixter, in the parish of Sandsting on the Mainland of Shetland, Scotland. It has fallen into disrepair due to its abandonment.

== History ==
It was constructed around 1900 by a local doctor.

== Description ==
The building is made of concrete and holds two floors. In the garden there is a Moorish temple which was previously used as a septic system. Originally two gate-piers were present at the south entrance but now only one is standing.

== Disrepair ==
The neglect of the house has had an effect not only on the gate-piers. Visits to the house since 1997 have shown the house is crumbling. More particularly, the walls are severely fractured in certain areas, the roof has mostly been displaced and much pipework and guttering has also been lost.

== Ownership ==
Park Hall has been a listed building since 26 March 1997 and it is currently in the possession of Historic Scotland.
