= List of listed buildings in Dunrossness =

This is a list of listed buildings in the parish of Dunrossness in the Shetland Islands, Scotland.

== List ==
| Name | Location | Date Listed | Grid Ref. (Note: Sometimes known as OSGB36, the grid reference (where provided) is based on the British national grid reference system used by the Ordnance Survey. • "Guide to National Grid". Ordnance Survey. • "Get-a-map". Ordnance Survey.) | Geo-coordinates | Notes | LB Number (Note: Historic Environment Scotland assign a unique alphanumeric identifier to each designated site in Scotland, for listed buildings this always begins with "LB", for example "LB12345".) | Image |
|---|---|---|---|---|---|---|---|
| Fair Isle, Aerogenerator | | | | 59°31′17″N 1°38′28″W | Category B | 44538 | Upload another image |
| Mail Kirk And Manse | | | | 60°02′04″N 1°13′50″W | Category C(S) | 44544 | Upload Photo |
| Bremire Crofthouse, Including Barns, Byre, Kiln, And Yard Wall | | | | 59°56′16″N 1°18′25″W | Category C(S) | 5415 | Upload Photo |
| Fair Isle, Fair Isle Old Hall (Now Museum) | | | | 59°31′03″N 1°38′34″W | Category B | 5418 | Upload Photo |
| Troswick Clack Mills, Including Road Bridge And Footbridges | | | | 59°56′14″N 1°16′28″W | Category B | 5440 | Upload Photo |
| Sumburgh Head, Sumburgh Lighthouse, Including Ancillary Buildings, Fog Horn House, Sundial, Boundary And Retaining Walls, Gates And Gatepiers | | | | 59°51′16″N 1°16′27″W | Category A | 5442 | Upload another image See more images |
| Fair Isle, Head Of Tind, South Fair Isle Lighthouse, Including Outbuilding, Sundial, Former Toilets And Petrol Store, Fog Horn House, Boundary Walls And Gatepiers, Former Lifeboat House, Winch, And Semaphore | | | | 59°30′50″N 1°39′08″W | Category B | 5411 | Upload another image See more images |
| Southvoe, Shetland Crofthouse Museum Including Byre, Barn And Kiln, Boat-Roofed Shed, Kailyard And Boundary Walls | | | | 59°54′53″N 1°17′21″W | Category B | 5413 | Upload another image |
| Sandsair Pier | | | | 60°00′25″N 1°13′14″W | Category B | 49410 | Upload Photo |
| Fair Isle, Fair Isle Methodist Chapel, Including Boundary Wall And Gatepiers | | | | 59°31′03″N 1°38′32″W | Category C(S) | 44540 | Upload another image |
| Sumburgh House (Now Hotel), Including Terrace, Boundary Walls, And Gatepiers | | | | 59°52′10″N 1°17′14″W | Category B | 44548 | Upload another image See more images |
| Villains Crofthouse, Including Outbuildings | | | | 60°02′15″N 1°13′54″W | Category C(S) | 44549 | Upload Photo |
| Sand Lodge, Including Walled Garden, Folly, Glasshouses, Conservatory, Steading And Cottage, Doocot, Sundial, Boundary Walls, Gates And Gatepiers | | | | 60°00′22″N 1°13′06″W | Category B | 5444 | Upload another image See more images |
| Fair Isle, North Fair Isle Lighthouse, Including Boundary Wall, Gate And Gatepiers, Sundial, Walkway And Fog Horn House | | | | 59°33′07″N 1°36′37″W | Category B | 5446 | Upload another image See more images |
| Fair Isle, Haa Of Fair Isle, Including Garage And Boundary Walls | | | | 59°30′58″N 1°38′34″W | Category B | 5447 | Upload another image |
| Sumburgh Home Farm, Including Farmhouse, Steading, Kiln And Boundary Walls | | | | 59°52′04″N 1°16′53″W | Category B | 5412 | Upload Photo |
| Fair Isle, Fair Isle Kirk (Church Of Scotland), Including Boundary Wall And Gatepiers | | | | 59°31′17″N 1°38′12″W | Category C(S) | 44539 | Upload another image |
| Fair Isle, Shirva, Telephone Kiosk | | | | 59°31′18″N 1°38′37″W | Category B | 44542 | Upload Photo |
| Southvoe, Burn Of Wiltrow, Southvoe Water Mills, Including Footbridges | | | | 59°54′49″N 1°17′08″W | Category B | 5414 | Upload Photo |
| Brew, Dunrossness Kirk (Church Of Scotland), Including Kirkyard Wall And Gatepiers | | | | 59°55′12″N 1°18′07″W | Category B | 5439 | Upload Photo |
| Sandwick Church (Church Of Scotland), Including Railings, Walls And Gatepiers | | | | 59°59′48″N 1°13′33″W | Category B | 78 | Upload another image |
| Fair Isle, North Haven, Storehouse | | | | 59°32′14″N 1°36′25″W | Category C(S) | 44541 | Upload another image |
| Sandwick Manse, Including Outbuildings, Boundary And Garden Walls And Summerhouse | | | | 59°59′58″N 1°13′51″W | Category B | 5443 | Upload Photo |
| Grutness, Lighthouse Store, Including Boundary Wall, Gate, And Gatepiers | | | | 59°52′22″N 1°16′44″W | Category C(S) | 44543 | Upload Photo |
| Out Voe, Fish-Curing Station | | | | 59°55′20″N 1°17′19″W | Category B | 44545 | Upload another image |
| Quendale Haa, Including Boundary Wall, And Gateway | | | | 59°54′06″N 1°20′18″W | Category B | 44546 | Upload another image |
| Bigton, Bigton House, Including Walls And Gatepiers | | | | 59°58′18″N 1°19′32″W | Category B | 5416 | Upload Photo |
| Quendale Mill, Including Dam, Steading, Walls, And Bridge | | | | 59°54′09″N 1°20′19″W | Category A | 5417 | Upload another image See more images |
| Bigton, St Ninian's Church (Church Of Scotland), Including Boundary Wall And Gatepiers | | | | 59°58′29″N 1°18′47″W | Category C(S) | 44537 | Upload another image |

== Key ==
The scheme for classifying buildings in Scotland is:

- Category A: "buildings of national or international importance, either architectural or historic; or fine, little-altered examples of some particular period, style or building type."
- Category B: "buildings of regional or more than local importance; or major examples of some particular period, style or building type, which may have been altered."
- Category C: "buildings of local importance; lesser examples of any period, style, or building type, as originally constructed or moderately altered; and simple traditional buildings which group well with other listed buildings."

In March 2016 there were 47,288 listed buildings in Scotland. Of these, 8% were Category A, and 50% were Category B, with the remaining 42% being Category C.
