= Shetland Amenity Trust =

Scottish community organisation

- Formation: 1983
- Type: Non-profit organisation
- Headquarters: Lerwick
- Coordinates: 60°09′31.1″N 1°09′13.0″W
- Region served: Shetland
- Leader: Ruth Mackenzie
- Website: https://www.shetlandamenity.org/

The Shetland Amenity Trust is a charitable trust based in Shetland, Scotland. It was formed in 1983.

Among the Trust's aims are to preserve and protect the architectural heritage of Shetland and it owns and operates many historical buildings. In partnership with other organisations, the Trust is responsible for the administration of Geopark Shetland which was formally designated in September 2009.

== Buildings ==
=== Old Scatness ===
Shetland Amenity Trust purchased the land upon which Old Scatness sits in 1995 to allow excavation to take place, and to allow public access to the site.

=== Lighthouses ===
Shetland Amenity Trust is responsible for a number of lighthouses around Shetland, including Sumburgh Head Lighthouse, Eshaness Lighthouse and Bressay Lighthouse. Bressay was put up for sale in August 2025. The trust also rents out the lighthouses as tourist accommodation.

== Events ==
=== Da Voar Redd-up ===
The Trust organises Da Voar Redd-up (Shetland dialect: The Spring Clean) in which volunteers clean beaches around Shetland's coast. Over 20% of the Shetland population participate in the event. As of 2018, Da Voar Redd-up has resulted in the removal of 1,900 tonnes of litter from the environment.

=== Shetland Wool Week ===
Shetland Amenity trust organises Shetland Wool Week, which is an annual event held in September–October where knitting enthusiasts from around the world take part in classes and workshops held in venues across Shetland. in 2019, 400 events were held, and over 1,000 people purchased tickets to Wool Week. The event is believed to be worth around £2 million to the Shetland economy annually.

== Sources ==
- Cope, Chris (15 November 2019). "Amenity trust 'stretched to capacity' during Wool Week". Shetland News.
- Jennings, Steve (28 October 2015). "In Depth - Excavation and the Story of Four Sites". Archaeology Shetland.
- Munro, Alistair (6 October 2016). "Shetland foghorn makes a blast at engineering awards". The Scotsman.
- "Da Voar Redd Up: Shetland's Spring Clean". Shetland.org. 4 July 2018.
- "Bressay Lighthouse". Northern Lighthouse Board. 2009. Archived from the original on 25 June 2016.
- "Esha Ness – Northern Lighthouse Board". www.nlb.org.uk.
- "Sumburgh Head". www.nlb.org.uk.
- "Voar Redd Up rubbish tally falls this year". The Shetland Times. 12 November 2019.
