= Hillswick =

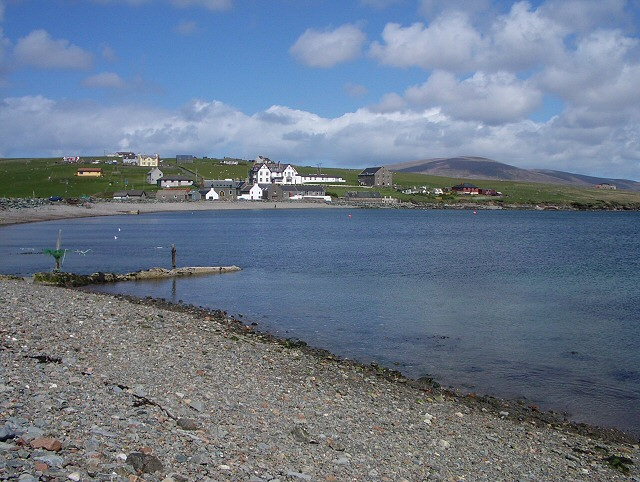
- The bay at Hillswick, looking across the bay with the main settlement on the far shore

- Location within Shetland
- OS grid reference: HU280769
- Civil parish: Northmaven
- Council area: Shetland
- Lieutenancy area: Shetland
- Country: Scotland
- Sovereign state: United Kingdom
- Post town: SHETLAND
- Postcode district: ZE2
- Dialling code: 01806
- Police: Scotland
- Fire: Scottish
- Ambulance: Scottish
- UK Parliament: Orkney and Shetland
- Scottish Parliament: Shetland
- Hillswick Lighthouse; Ura Firth; Baa Taing
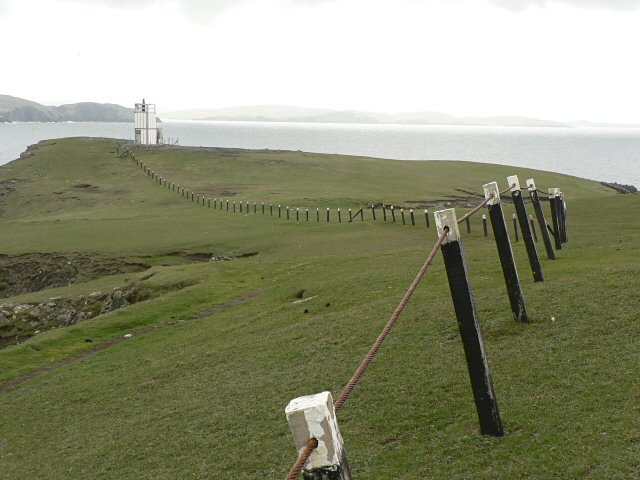
- Coordinates: 60.453557°N 1.496517°W
- Constructed: 1895 (first)
- Foundation: concrete base
- Construction: metal skeletal tower
- Height: 5 metres (16 ft)
- Shape: quadrangular tower covered by aluminium panels with light on the top
- Markings: white tower
- Power source: solar power
- Operator: Northern Lighthouse Board
- First lit: n/a (current)
- Focal height: 34 metres (112 ft)
- Range: white: 9 nautical miles (17 km; 10 mi) red: 6 nautical miles (11 km; 6.9 mi)
- Characteristic: Fl (4) WR 15s.

Hillswick (Shaetlan pronunciation: [ˈhɪɫsuk] HILL-sook) is a small village in Northmavine, on the shore of the Atlantic Ocean and lies to the north-north west of Mainland, Shetland, the most northerly group of islands in the United Kingdom. It is situated 35 mi (56 km) from Lerwick.

There is a community shop, a blacksmith, a public hall, a health centre, and a Church of Scotland kirk that is now mainly used for funerals, weddings and christenings. There is a wildlife sanctuary, situated at the historic former Hanseatic trading booth on the seafront, a small private art gallery with occasional public exhibitions, and the St Magnus Bay Hotel which offers accommodation, a bar and restaurant. A large dairy and sheep farm takes up the spectacular peninsula called Hillswick Ness, but there is public access and a signed walking route. There is a modern primary school at nearby Urafirth. A small automatic lighthouse is located 1.5 miles south of Hillswick, at the tip of the Ness.

== See also ==
- List of lighthouses in Scotland
- List of Northern Lighthouse Board lighthouses
