= Esha Ness Lighthouse =

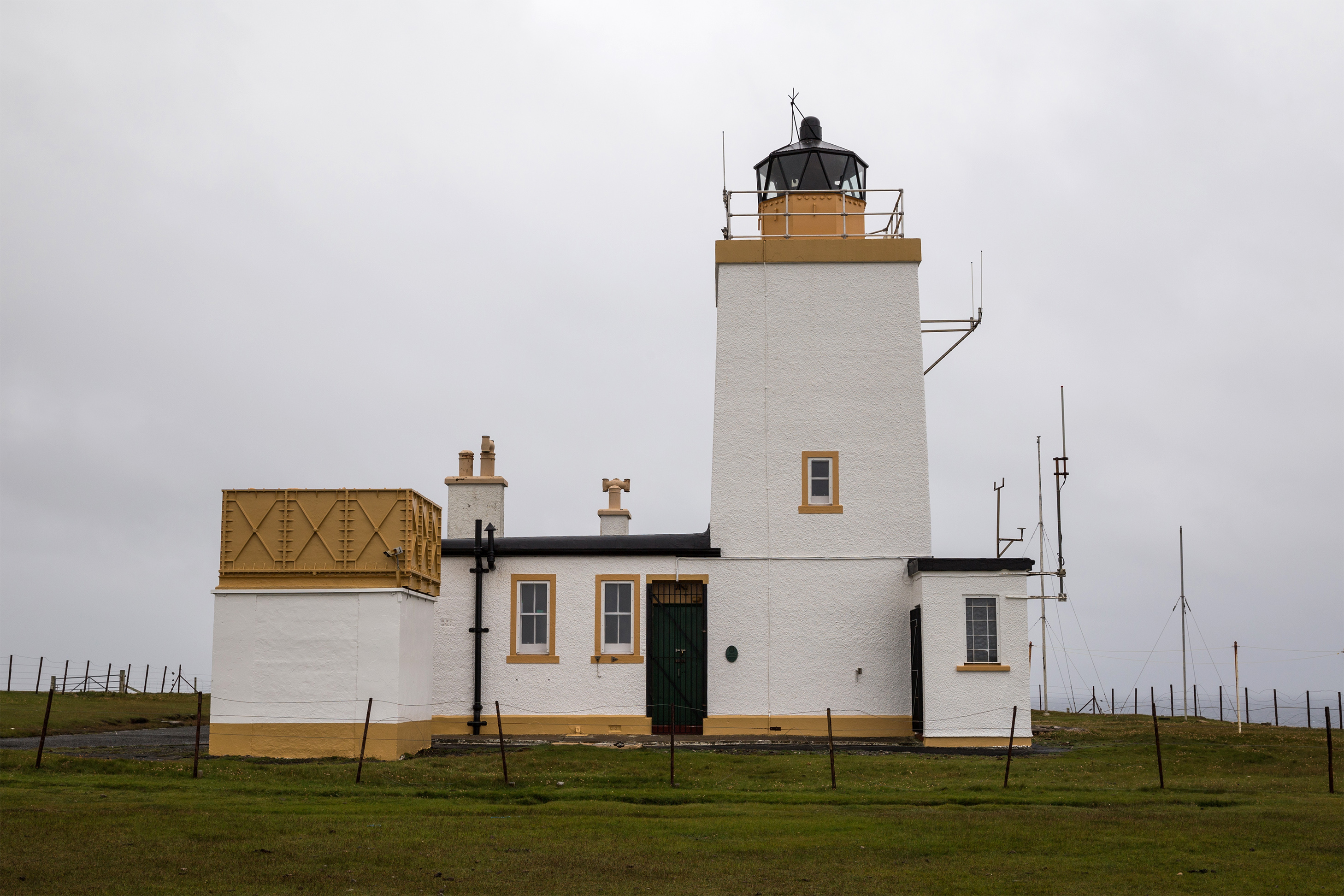
- Location: Mainland, Shetland, Northmaven, United Kingdom
- OS grid: HU2058078451
- Coordinates: 60°29′21″N 1°37′38″W

Tower
- Constructed: 1925
- Designed by: David Alan Stevenson
- Construction: masonry tower
- Automated: 1974
- Height: 12 m (39 ft)
- Shape: square tower with balcony and lantern
- Markings: white tower, black lantern, ochre trim
- Operator: Northern Lighthouse Board
- Heritage: category B listed building

Light
- First lit: 1929
- Focal height: 61 m (200 ft)
- Intensity: 46,500 candela
- Range: 25 nmi (46 km; 29 mi)
- Characteristic: Fl W 12s

Esha Ness Lighthouse is situated at Esha Ness, on the Northmavine peninsula in the north-west mainland of the Shetland Islands, Scotland. It sometimes rendered as Eshaness Lighthouse. The lighthouse is at the westernmost extremity of the peninsula near the location of Calder's Geo, and exposed to the Atlantic Ocean.

The lighthouse has a tapering square tower 12 metres (39 ft) high and was built between 1925 and 1929 by David Alan Stevenson and Charles Alexander Stevenson, two of the famous 'lighthouse' Stevensons, grandsons of Robert Stevenson. It was built from concrete because of the unsuitability of the local stone.

It flashes white every 12 seconds and has a nominal range of 25 nautical miles (46 km). The light is housed in an octagonal lantern atop the square tower, which was built at the top of a 200 ft (60 m) high cliff.

The lighthouse replaced a temporary structure constructed in 1915 on the Eshaness peninsula to warn of the Ve Skerries some 8.5 miles (13.7 km; 7.4 nmi) offshore to the south-west. This temporary structure was removed after World War I.

The light was automated in 1974 and the former lighthouse keepers' accommodation is now holiday accommodation. It is owned by the Shetland Amenity Trust. Unusually, the accommodation was built for only one keeper, whereas most facilities housed three.

The lighthouse was listed in 1997, as although it is part of a relatively common type, it has some unusual features, including the use of concrete as a building material. The remote setting of the lighthouse is largely unchanged since it was built, and the structure itself is relatively unmodified and contains much of the original character. It was also the last lighthouse to be built by the Stevenson family of lighthouse engineers, who had designed most of the lighthouses around Scotland over a period of 150 years.

== See also ==
- List of lighthouses in Scotland
- List of Northern Lighthouse Board lighthouses
