= Tangwick Haa =

Building in the Shetland Islands, Scotland

Tangwick Haa Museum
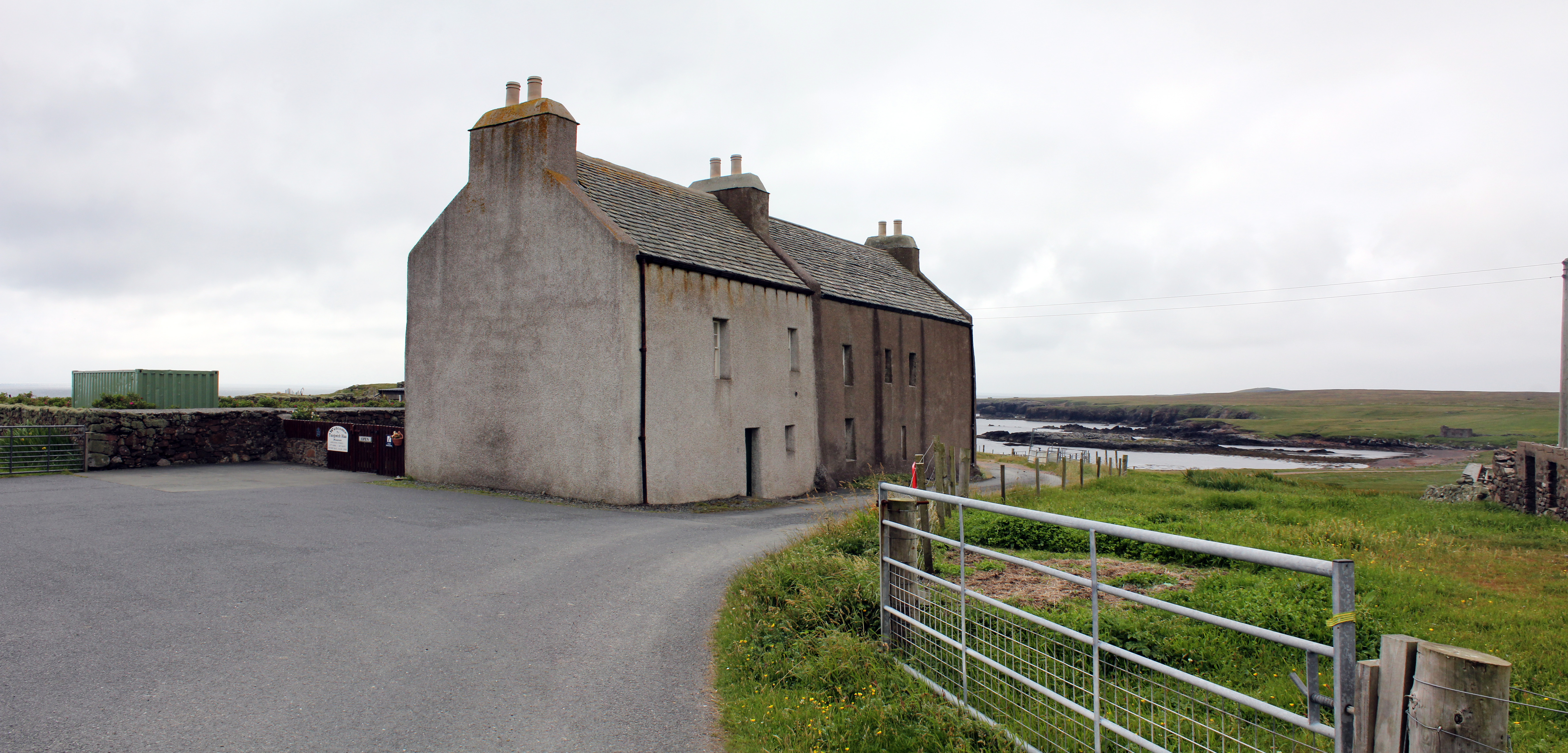
- Tangwick Haa Museum

- Location within Shetland
- Location: Tangwick, Eshaness, Shetland, Scotland
- Coordinates: 60°28′56″N 1°34′44″W
- Type: Local history
- Parking: On site
- Website: https://www.tangwickhaa.org.uk/

Tangwick Haa (Shaetlan pronunciation: [ˌtanukˈhaː] TAN-ook-HA) is an historic house and museum in Esha Ness, Northmavine, Shetland. The building has two stories in a rectangular layout and along with the adjacent walled garden is Category B listed.

== History ==
The house was built in the 17th century, circa 1690, for the Cheynes family, who owned land both in Shetland and across Scotland. One of the most prominent members of the family who lived there in early childhood was John Cheyne (1841–1907) who served as a judge. The house is built with thick walls in harling. It was built at a site beside an accessible shingle beach which provided access before the road was built to Northmavine from central Mainland, Shetland.

In 1978 the house was converted into a visitor centre for Northmavine. In 1987 it was converted and opened as a museum.

== Collections ==
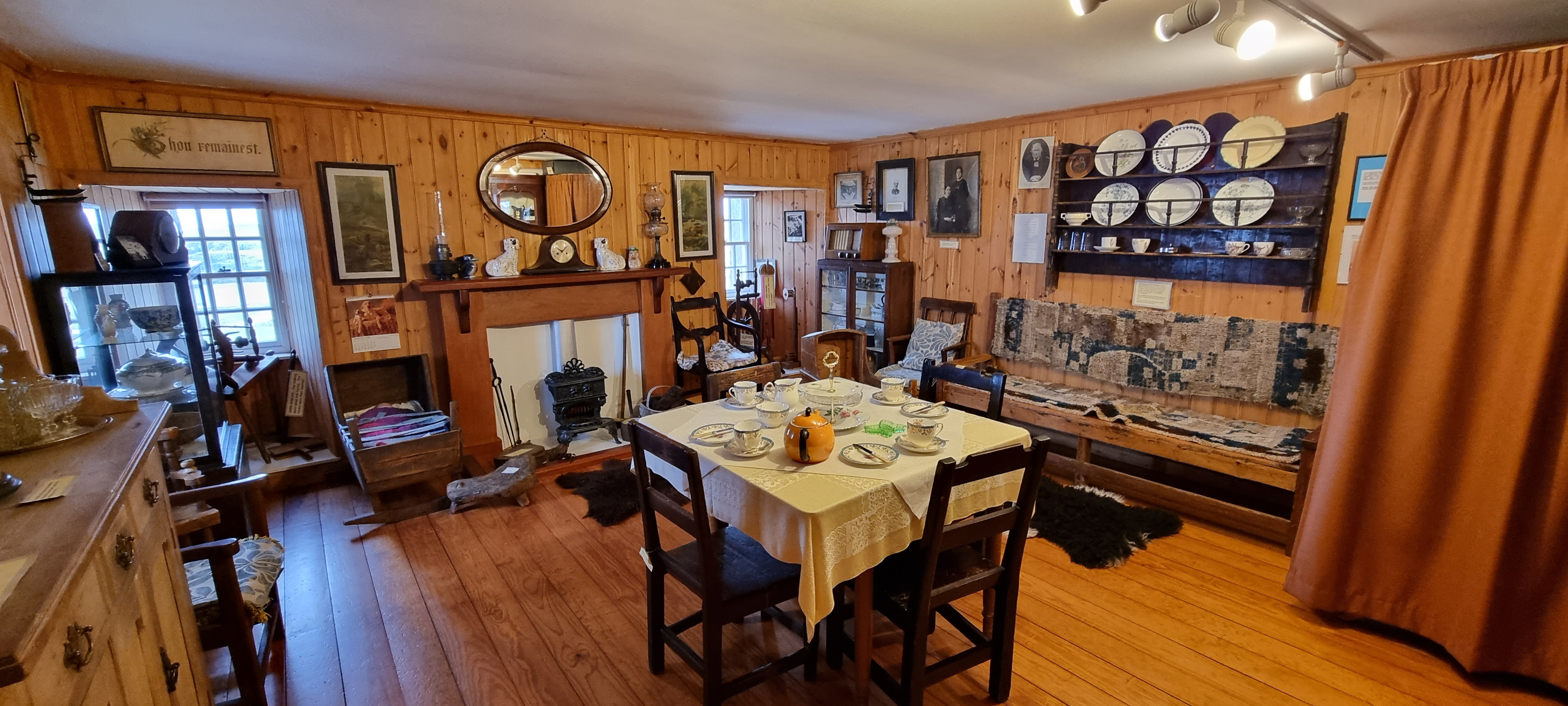
19th-century laird's room

The museum contains exhibits on local life as well as a room furnished as a 19th-century laird's room. There are both permanent and temporary exhibitions, as well as a family history record section.
