= Northmavine =

Presque-isle in Shetland Islands, Scotland

Coordinates: 60°30′N 1°24′W

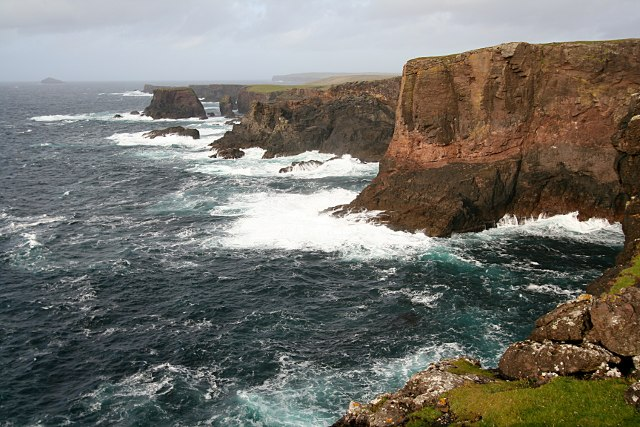
- Cliffs near Eshaness Lighthouse, Northmavine

- Area: 204.1 km^{2} (78.8 sq mi)
- Population: 811
- Demonym: Oily Muggie
- Country: Scotland
- Sovereign state: United Kingdom
- Postcode district: ZE2
- Dialling code: 01806
- Police: Scotland
- Fire: Scottish
- Ambulance: Scottish
- Scottish Parliament: Shetland (Scottish Parliament constituency)
- Website: https://www.northmavine.com

Northmavine or Northmaven (Shaetlan pronunciation: [nɒrt'mevin] norrt-MAY-veen) is a sparsely populated peninsula in Shetland, forming the northernmost part of Mainland. The name comes from Old Norse norðan mœv-eið, meaning "north of the narrow isthmus".

The peninsula has historically formed a civil parish of the same name. The modern Northmavine community council area has the same extent. The area of the parish is given as 204.1 km^{2}.

== Summary ==
Northmavine includes the villages of Hillswick, Ollaberry, and North Roe. An isthmus, Mavis Grind, about a hundred yards across, forms the sole connection with the rest of Mainland. The coast is indented by numerous bays and consists largely of high, steep rocks. There are a number of high, fissured, cavernous cliffs on the west coast, faced by many skerries, islets, and offshore rocks. The interior has a very small amount of arable land; it consists mostly of rough, rising ground, including Ronas Hill, the highest point in all Shetland.

Esha Ness Lighthouse is situated on the Northmavine peninsula. Tangwick Haa Museum preserves the history of Northmavine including knitted replicas of the stockings and purse of Gunnister Man. Remains of ancient watch houses and remains of barrows and forts are also numerous.

== Population ==
At the provisional population census conducted in March 2017, the population numbered 741, yielding a population density of 3.6 per km^{2}, which is the second lowest in Shetland, after Fetlar.

Population of Northmavine
1931	...	1961	1971	1981	1991	2001	2011
1343	...	816	696	898	878	841	741

== Notable people ==
- Johnnie Notions (c. 1730 – c. 1803), self-taught smallpox innoculator
- William Jack (1768–1854), born and raised here, was a Church of Scotland academic who served as Principal of King's College, Aberdeen
- Sir John Cheyne of Tangwick (1841–1907), judge
- Tom Anderson (1910–1991), composer and collector of traditional Shetland fiddle tunes
- Tom Morton (born 1955), Scottish broadcaster
- James Morton (born 1991), contestant of The Great British Bake Off

== Related reading ==
- Guy, Peter (2006) Northmavine (Walking the Coastline of Shetland) (Shetland Times Ltd) ISBN 978-1904746171
