= Liefde (East Indiaman) =

Dutch sailing ship that ran aground off the Shetland Islands, Great Britain

- Liefde may have looked like the VOC type frigate 'Pieter and Paul' as depicted in a 1698 drawing by Abraham Storck

History
- Name: Liefde
- Owner: Vereenigde Oostindische Compagnie (VOC)
- Port of registry: Dutch Republic
- Builder: Vereenigde Oostindische Compagnie (VOC)
- In service: 1698
- Out of service: 7 November 1711
- Fate: Ran aground and sank during a storm

General characteristics
- Class & type: VOC type frigate
- Type: Sailing ship
- Tonnage: 1009bm
- Length: 48.8 metres (160 ft 1 in)
- Crew: 300
- Armament: 32 Cannons

Liefde was a Dutch sailing ship that ran aground and sank during a storm in the North Sea off the Shetland Islands, Great Britain, while she was on her fourth homeward voyage from the East under the command of Captain Meikens Barend.

== Owners ==
Liefde was built in The Netherlands by the Vereenigde Oostindische Compagnie (VOC) as a frigate for voyages to the East.

== Sinking ==
On 7 November 1711 Liefde was on her fourth homeward voyage from the East under the command of Captain Meikens Barend and with a crew of 300. She was thought to be carrying 32 guns as well as merchandise from the east, some 227,000 guilders in bags and 1800 silver and gold ducats. After a storm hit the ship, she ran aground and sank off the Shetland Islands, Great Britain leaving only one survivor of the entire crew. This individual, whose name is unknown, lodged with a local family for about a year before being taken off the island.

== Wreck ==
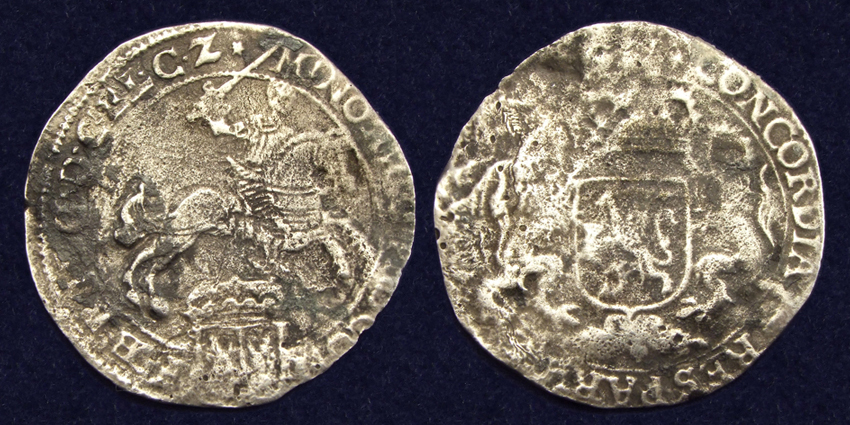
West-Friesland, silver Ducat (Rider) 1672, retrieved from 'the Liefde'

https://en.wikipedia.org/wiki/Liefde_(East_Indiaman)About 2,000 guilders were salvaged by the local inhabitants during the year following the ship's sinking. In August 1965 Dutch coins were found washed ashore on the island of Housay in the Out Skerries by divers. In 1968 the remains of the wreck were discovered on the southernmost tip of the island. They lie in a cleft called Dregging Geos on the Mio Ness peninsula.
