= Grunay =

Coordinates: 60.422°N 0.740°W

Out Skerries Light
- Location: Grunay, United Kingdom

Tower
- Constructed: 1854

Light
- First lit: 15 September 1854
- Deactivated: 1858

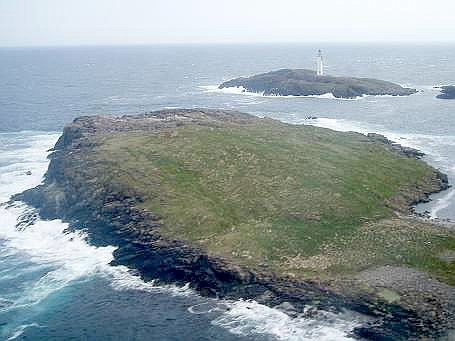
An aerial view of Grunay with Bound Skerry in background

Grunay is an uninhabited island in the Out Skerries group, the most easterly part of Shetland, Scotland. Its area is 55.58 acres, or 22.49 hectares.

The island is the site of the lighthouse keeper's house for the lighthouse on the nearby Bound Skerry. This house was abandoned following the automation of the light in 1972.

A Blenheim IV bomber from No. 404 Squadron RCAF crashed on the south side of the island on the morning of 21 February 1942, possibly crippled by enemy fire off the coast of Norway. A plaque was placed on the island in 1990 to commemorate the crew by the nephew of one of the three men who died.

== See also ==
- List of islands of Scotland
