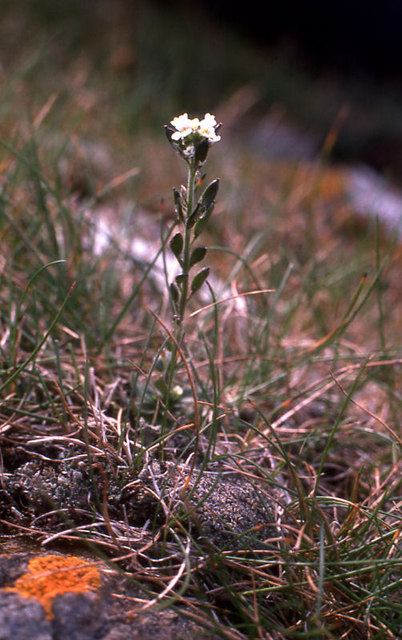
- Keen of Hamar nature reserve, Scotland

Scientific classification
- Kingdom: Plantae
- Clade: Tracheophytes
- Clade: Angiosperms
- Clade: Eudicots
- Clade: Rosids
- Order: Brassicales
- Family: Brassicaceae
- Genus: Draba
- Species: D. incana

Binomial name
- Draba incana L.

= Draba incana =

Species of flowering plant

Draba incana L. — Drave blanchâtre. — (Twisted whitlow grass), is a species of flowering plant belonging to the family Brassicaceae.

Its native range is Canada to Northern Central and Northeastern USA, Greenland, Northern Europe, Alps, Pyrenees.

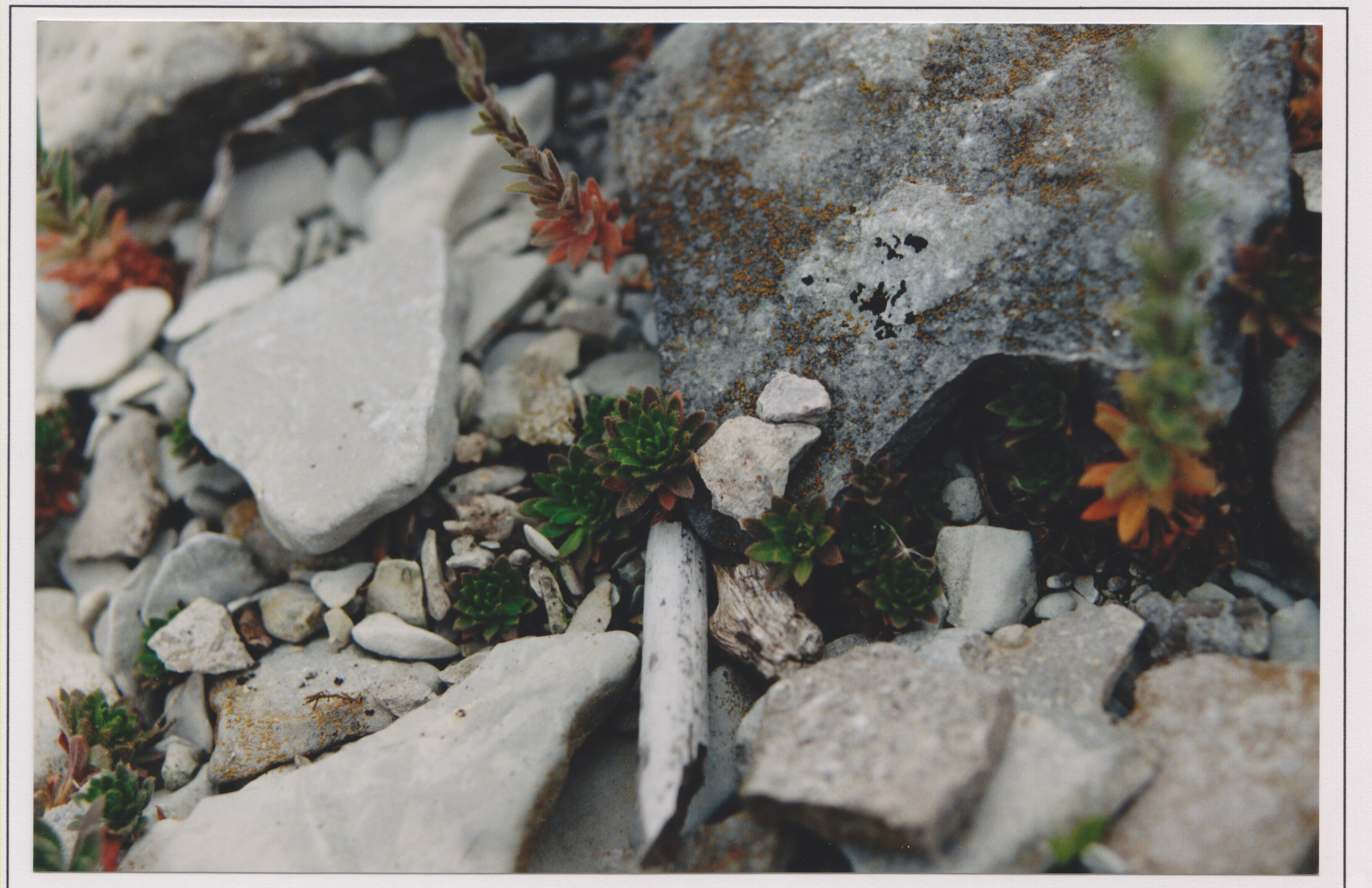
Draba incana L., limestone gravel, shore at Baie-Sainte-Claire, Anticosti Island, Quebec, Canada
