= Bound Skerry =

Shetlands island that is the easternmost point of Scotland

Location
- Location within Shetland
- OS grid reference: HU702719
- Coordinates: 60.424°N 0.728°W

Physical geography
- Island group: Out Skerries Shetland
- Area: 0.05 km

Administration
- Council area: Shetland Islands
- Country: Scotland
- Sovereign state: United Kingdom

Demographics
- Population: 0
- Bound Skerry Lighthouse
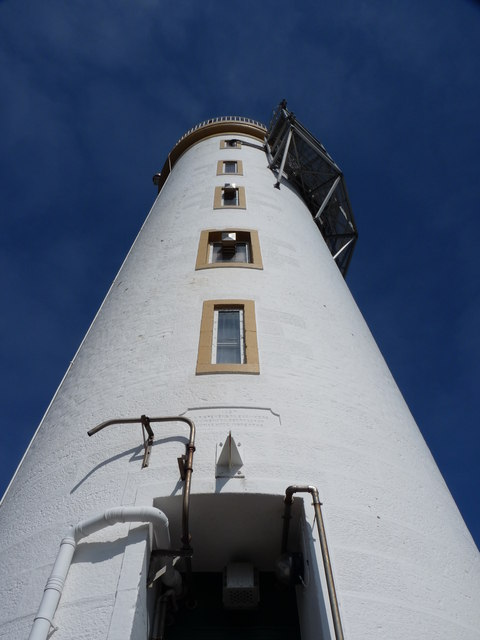
- Bound Skerry Lighthouse in 2009
- Constructed: 1858
- Built by: David Stevenson, Thomas Stevenson
- Construction: stone
- Automated: 7 April 1972
- Height: 30 m (98 ft)
- Shape: cylindrical tower with balcony and lantern
- Markings: White (tower), black (lantern), ochre (trim)
- Operator: Northern Lighthouse Board
- Heritage: category B listed building
- Focal height: 44 m (144 ft)
- Intensity: 159,000 candela
- Range: 20 nmi (37 km; 23 mi)
- Characteristic: Fl W 20s

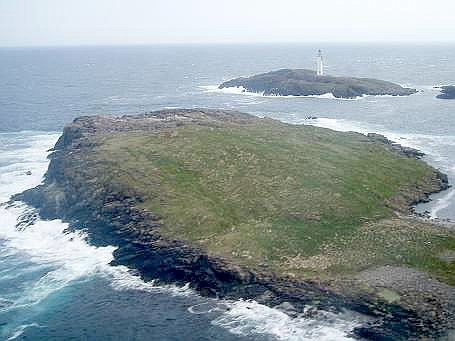
An aerial view of Grunay with Bound Skerry in background

Bound Skerry is part of the Out Skerries group in the Shetland Islands. As well as being the most easterly island of that group, it is also the easternmost point of Scotland.

It has a lighthouse on it, which was built in 1857 at a cost of £21,000. Robert Louis Stevenson's family were lighthouse builders, and his signature can be seen in its guestbook. The keepers lived on nearby Grunay.

The island was bombed twice in World War II by the German Luftwaffe, because it was suspected to harbour a munitions factory.

== See also ==
- List of lighthouses in Scotland
- List of Northern Lighthouse Board lighthouses
