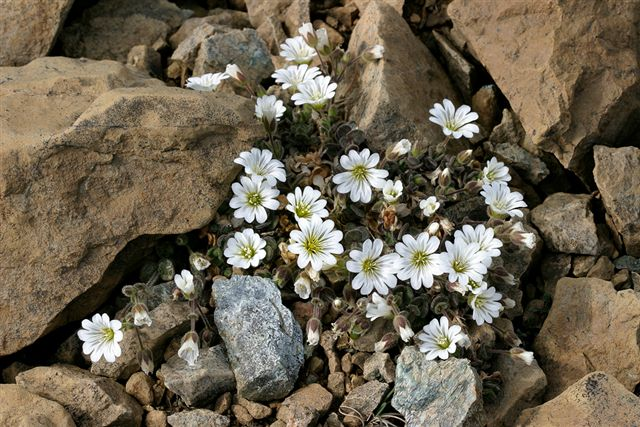

Scientific classification
- Kingdom: Plantae
- Clade: Tracheophytes
- Clade: Angiosperms
- Clade: Eudicots
- Order: Caryophyllales
- Family: Caryophyllaceae
- Genus: Cerastium
- Species: C. nigrescens

Binomial name
- Cerastium nigrescens (H.Watson) Edmondston ex H.Watson

= Cerastium nigrescens =

Species of flowering plant in the pink family

Cerastium nigrescens var. nigrescens, commonly known as the Shetland mouse-ear, Shetland mouse-eared chickweed or Edmondston's chickweed, is an endemic variety of Arctic Chickweed, Cerastium nigrescens, found in Shetland, Scotland.

It was first recorded in 1837 by botanist Thomas Edmondston, who was 12 at the time. Although reported from two other sites in the 19th century, it currently grows only on two serpentine hills on the island of Unst (see Keen of Hamar).

The numbers of Cerastium nigrescens var. nigrescens can vary dramatically from year to year, for reasons that are unclear (probably due to a varying rates of seedling germination and survival), but the underlying trend seems stable, and there has been no change in its distribution.

Mature plants may be not much more than a single shoot with one flower or can be a fist-sized cushion with as many as 40 flowers. Flowers look disproportionately large compared with the size of the plant.
