= Bruray =

Island in Shetland, Scotland

Location
- Bruray shown within Shetland
- OS grid reference: HU689720
- Coordinates: 60.426°N 0.750°W

Name
- Old Norse name: Bruray

Physical geography
- Island group: Shetland
- Area: 55 hectares (0.21 sq mi)
- Area rank: 189=
- Highest elevation: 53 metres (174 ft)

Administration
- Council area: Shetland Islands
- Country: Scotland
- Sovereign state: United Kingdom

Demographics
- Population: 16
- Population rank: 65
- Population density: 29 people/km^{2}

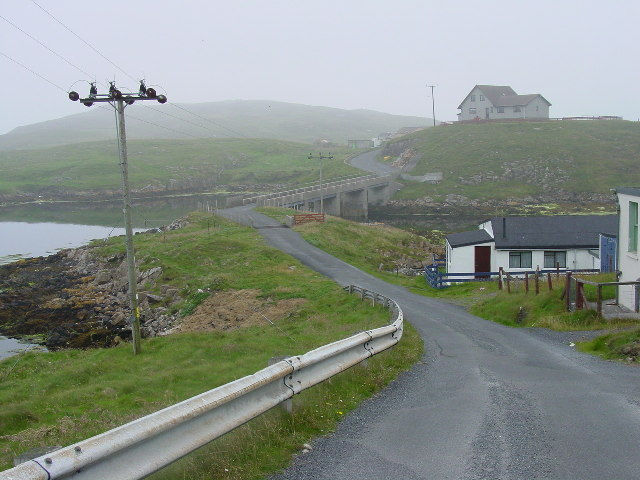
A bridge links Bruray to Housay

Bruray is one of the three Out Skerries islands of Shetland, and contains Scotland's most easterly settlement.

It is separated from Housay by North Mouth and South Mouth.

== Infrastructure ==
The Skerries Bridge was built in 1957 to provide a fixed link from Bruray to the neighbouring and larger island of Housay.

Bruray is home to Scotland's smallest school.

The island occasionally suffers from water shortages. There is little peat on the Out Skerries, so the residents have been granted rights to cut in on Whalsay.

A ferry connects the Out Skerries with Vidlin and Lerwick on the Shetland Mainland. Bruray also has a small airstrip, with flights from Tingwall by Loganair.

== History ==
At the autumn 2010, the islands of Housay and Bruray were on sale for £250,000. "The main islands are held under crofting tenure. The crofting community have been offered the opportunity to register their interest in acquiring the property but have formally declined from doing so."

== See also ==
- Extreme points of Scotland
- Extreme points of the United Kingdom.
