= East Burra =

One of the Scalloway Islands in Scotland

Location
- East Burra shown within Shetland
- OS grid reference: HU388339
- Coordinates: 60.08°N 1.31°W

Name
- Name meaning: east broch island?
- Old Norse name: Barrey

Physical geography
- Island group: Shetland
- Area: 515 ha (1,270 acres)
- Area rank: 73
- Highest elevation: 81 m (266 ft)

Administration
- Council area: Shetland Islands
- Country: Scotland
- Sovereign state: United Kingdom

Demographics
- Population: 105
- Population rank: 44
- Population density: 20 people/km^{2}

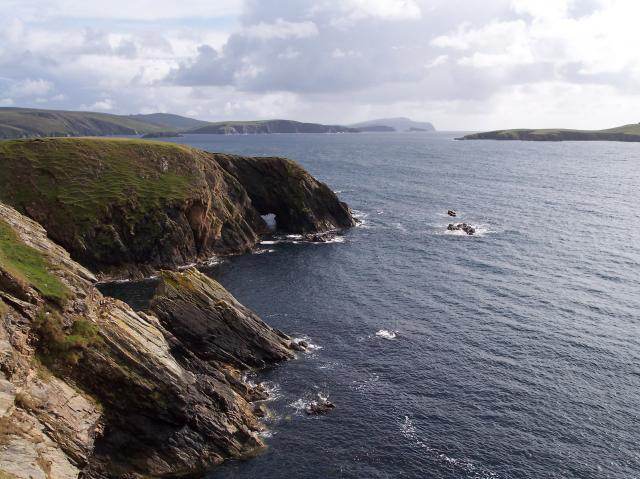
The south end of East Burra

East Burra (Old Norse: Barrey) is one of the Scalloway Islands, a subgroup of the Shetland Islands in Scotland. It is connected by a bridge to West Burra.

With an area of 515 hectares (1,273 acres) it is the twelfth largest of the Shetland Islands.

East Burra has a much smaller population than West Burra and no substantial settlement; rather, there are a few hamlets and a scattering of individual croft houses. It is known for its Neolithic remains including a burnt mound, and for sea caves. The roofless, plain, Old Haa (manor or laird's house) of Houss is a prominent feature. From Houss, it is possible to walk the two kilometres or so across Houss Ness to the cliffs at the southern end of the island. From there, the island of South Havra, nowadays home only to sheep and seabirds, can be clearly seen.

East Burra is linked to the Shetland Mainland via West Burra and Trondra by a series of bridges.

== Etymology ==
Collins Encyclopedia of Scotland suggests that the name "Burra" is a corruption of "Borgarey" (island of the broch), and while this is unlikely, and no broch is extant, the place name Brough, on West Burra lends some support to this case. However, the form used in the Orkneyinga saga is "Barrey".
