= Thomas Fraser (singer) =

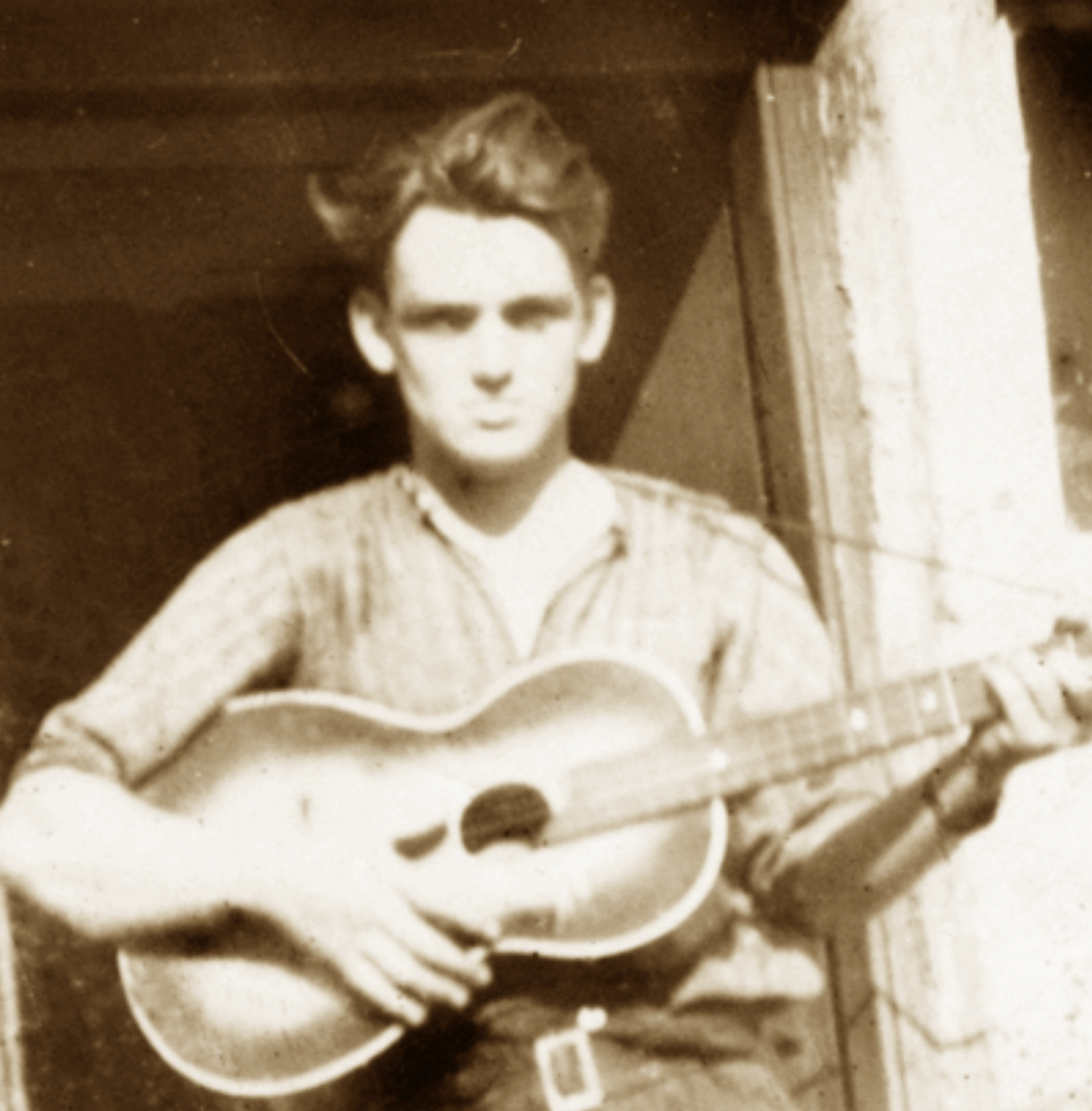
- Thomas Fraser

Background information
- Born: 20 March 1927
- Origin: Burra, Shetland, Scotland
- Died: 6 January 1978 (aged 50)
- Genres: Country and Western
- Occupation: Musician
- Instrument: Fiddle/Guitar
- Years active: Posthumously
- Labels: Nel Records

Thomas James Fraser (20 March 1927 – 6 January 1978) was a Scottish fisherman and Country and Western and rhythm and blues musician from Shetland.

Fraser was born on the isle of Burra. He never released any recordings during his lifetime and rarely played live before paying audiences. He made a number of recordings on a reel to reel tape recorder, which family members circulated after his death. In the late 1990s some of these tapes were transferred to CD.

In 2002 Nel Records put out a small pressing of Long Gone Lonesome Blues a selection of some of the original tapes. Two more CDs followed (You & My Old Guitar (2003) and Treasure Untold (2005)), and a yearly Thomas Fraser memorial festival was begun in Shetland in 2002. A fourth CD of previously unreleased material, That Far Away Land, was released in November 2008. The following month, BBC Scotland aired a 30-minute documentary on the life of Thomas Fraser entitled Shetland Lone Star. A DVD featuring this programme and highlights of the annual Thomas Fraser Festival was released in October 2009. The National Theatre of Scotland also toured Scotland during October with a full theatrical production on the life of Thomas Fraser, entitled Long Gone Lonesome. The production was revived for a 2012 tour of the United States of America. A fifth CD of unreleased material is due out in November 2010.

== Death ==
He died from complications of a sailing incident on 6 January 1978.
