= Housay =

Island in the Shetland Islands, Scotland

Location
- Housay shown within Shetland
- OS grid reference: HU680717
- Coordinates: 60.423°N 0.767°W

Name
- Name meaning: House Island
- Old Norse name: Húsey

Physical geography
- Island group: Shetland
- Area: 163 hectares (0.63 sq mi)
- Area rank: 119
- Highest elevation: 53 metres (174 ft)

Administration
- Council area: Shetland Islands
- Country: Scotland
- Sovereign state: United Kingdom

Demographics
- Population: 21
- Population rank: 59=
- Population density: 9.6 people/km^{2}

Housay, also known as West Isle, is one of the three islands that form the Out Skerries island group, the most easterly part of the Shetland Isles.

== Geography and geology ==
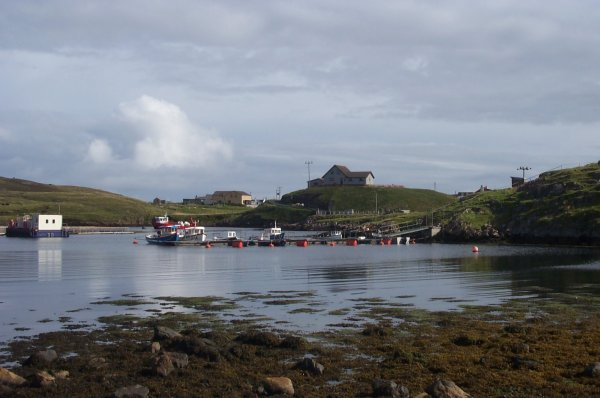
The North Mouth (bay) which separates the islands of Housay and Bruray.

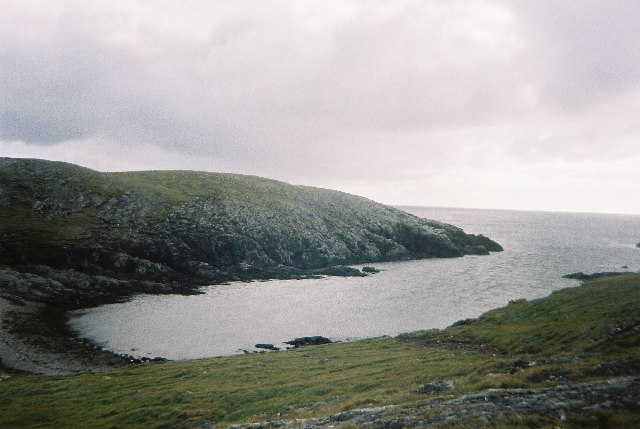
A bay on Housay

Housay has the most complex geology of the Out Skerries, with granite in Mio Ness in the far south west, limestone on the south coast, and large concentrations of gneiss and schist.

The island of Housay consists of several thin headlands, with the biggest pointing to the south west, and over 1 mile (1.6 km) long. To the north, another headland extends, and then turns towards the south west, running parallel to the biggest one, and separated by West Voe.

The island is surrounded by a number of stacks including the Hevda Stacks in the north and the Stack a Mooth and Stack a Pillar in the south. There are also some sea caves in the south, and Da Steig, which connects the island to Mio Ness is a collapsed one.

It is separated from Bruray by North Mouth and South Mouth.

The island occasionally suffers from water shortages. There is little peat on the Out Skerries, so the residents have been granted rights to cut it on Whalsay.

== History ==
The large number of Norse placenames suggest that it has been inhabited since at least Viking times, if not earlier.

The island's population peaked in 1891 with nearly ninety people, now it is approximately twenty. 45 people were recorded in 1991, and 50 in 2001.

At the autumn 2010, the islands of Housay and Bruray (600.00 acres) were on sale for £250,000. "The main islands are held under crofting tenure. the Crofting community have been offered the opportunity to register their interest in acquiring the property but have formally declined from doing so."

== Infrastructure ==
The post office, one of Skerries two shops, the church and the public hall are located here.

The Skerries Bridge was built in 1957 to provide a fixed link from Bruray to the neighbouring and larger Housay.

== See also ==
- List of islands of Scotland
