= Keen of Hamar =

Coordinates: 60.766063°N 0.817983°W

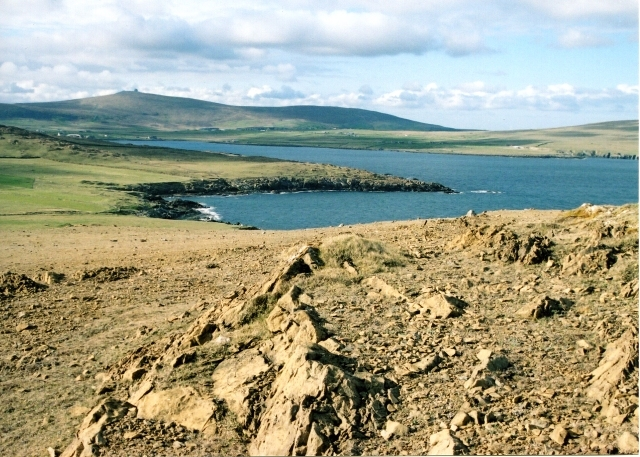

Keen of Hamar (Shaetlan pronunciation: [ˌkin ə ˈhamər] KEEN-ə-HAM-ər) is a nature reserve on Unst, in Shetland, Scotland, managed by Scottish Natural Heritage. The reserve is primarily of botanical interest, for example for populations of Cerastium nigrescens, a plant unique to Unst.

Keen of Hamar was designated a special area of conservation on 17 March 2005. It is also a site of special scientific interest. The site is of outstanding interest for the interaction of plants with the thin, chromium metal-rich soil.

Scottish Natural Heritage provides further information on its SSSI site management statement.

The geological features at the site are a highlight of Geopark Shetland.

== See also ==
- Geology of Scotland
- Hagdale Chromate Railway
