= Out Skerries =

Archipelago in Shetland

Location
- Out Skerries shown within the Shetland Islands
- OS grid reference: HU681718
- Coordinates: 60°25′N 0°46′W

Physical geography
- Island group: Shetland
- Area: 400 hectares (990 acres)
- Highest elevation: Bruray Wart 53 metres (174 ft)

Administration
- Council area: Shetland Islands Council
- Country: Scotland
- Sovereign state: United Kingdom

Demographics
- Population: 30

The Out Skerries are an archipelago of islets, some inhabited, in Shetland, Scotland, and are the easternmost part of Shetland as well as Scotland. Locally, they are usually called Da Skerries or just Skerries.

== Geography ==
The Out Skerries lie about 6 kilometres (4 mi) northeast of Whalsay; and Bound Skerry forms the easternmost part of Shetland, lying just 300 km (around 190 miles) west from Tjeldstø in Norway. The main islands are Housay, Bruray, and Grunay. The summit of Bruray, Bruray Ward, is the most easterly hill in Scotland.

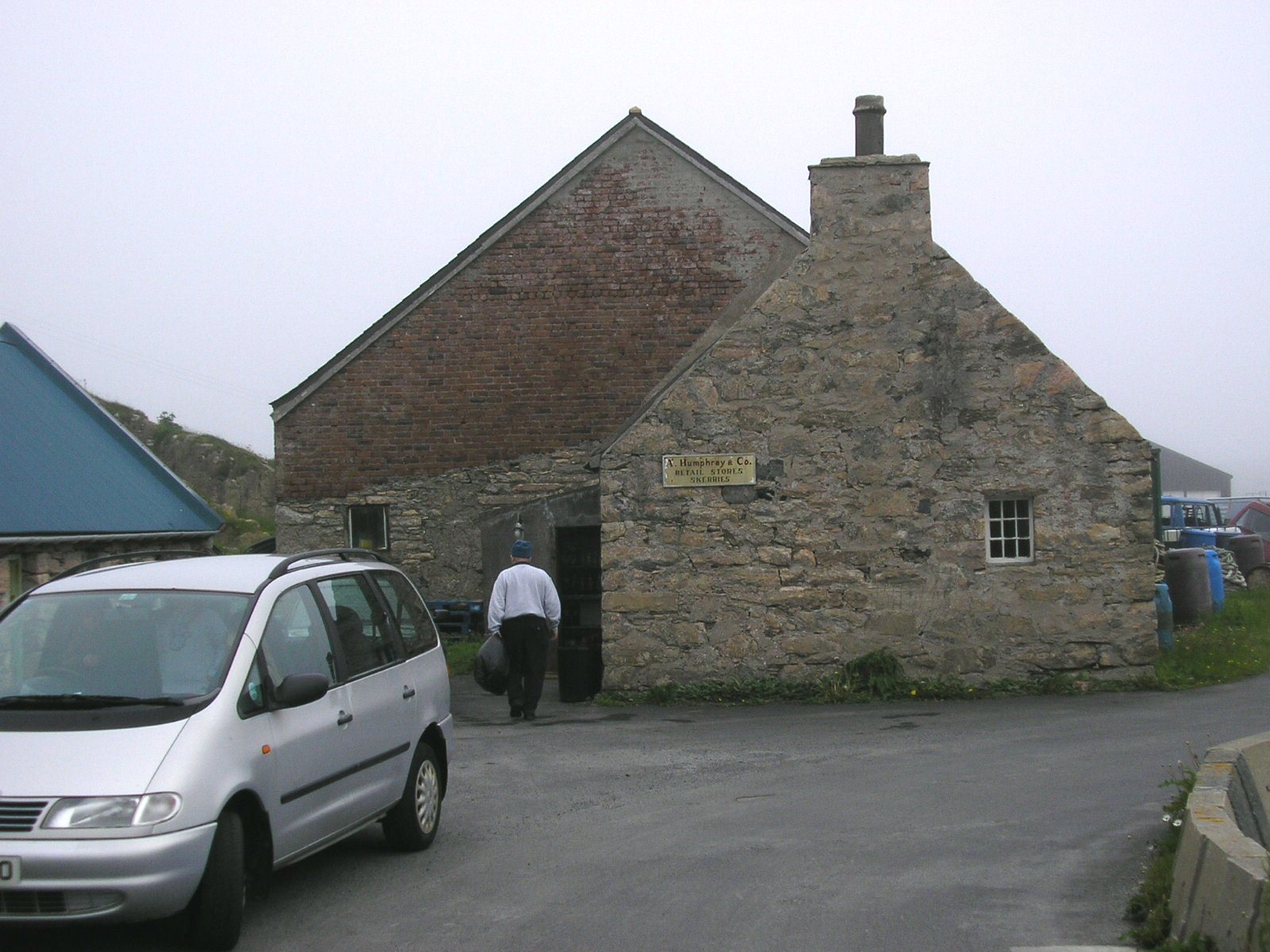
A shop in the Out Skerries

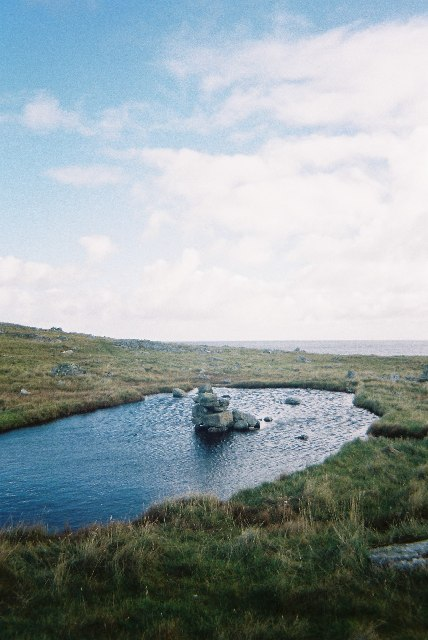
Loch on Housay

A large number of skerries, islets and stacks surround the main group. These include the Hevda Skerries and Wether Holm to the north, the Holm to the south and Lamba Stack and Flat Lamba Stack to the east. Stoura Stack and the Hogg are to the south of Grunay. Bound Skerry, which has a lighthouse, is flanked by Little Bound Skerry and Horn Skerry.

Beyond Mio Ness at the southwest tip of Housay are North and South Benelip and the Easter Skerries, as well as Filla, Short and Long Guen (the Guens), Bilia Skerry, and Swaba Stack. In an isolated group between the main Out Skerries and the Mainland, are Little Skerry and the Vongs, and Muckle Skerry is another outlier lying further north.

== Etymology ==
Most of the Skerries placenames have a Norse origin. The "Out" name derives from one or both of two Old Norse words. Austr means "east" and may have been used to distinguish Out Skerries from Ve Skerries or "west skerries", and utsker means "outer". "Skerry" is from the Old Norse sker and refers to a small rocky island or a rocky reef.

Housay is from the Old Norse Húsey meaning "house island", although this name is now little used by locals, who prefer "West Isle". Bruray may be from the Norse brú and mean "bridge island" due to its position between West Isle and Grunay, the latter meaning simply "green island". The derivation of Bound Skerry is more problematic, but may be from bønn, meaning "forerunner", a reference to this being the first land a ship encounters en route to Shetland from Bergen.

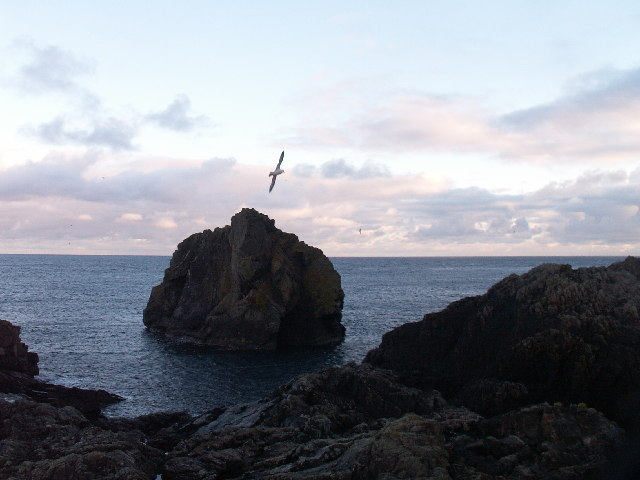
Lamba Stack

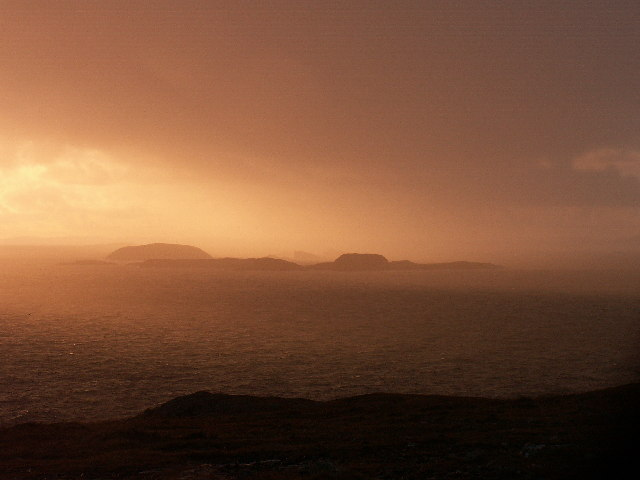
The Benelips

== History ==
=== Prehistory ===
There is evidence of Neolithic inhabitation including two house sites at Queyness. The Battle Pund is a rectangle 13 metres (43 ft) across, marked out by boulders, dating from the Bronze Age. It is similar to a structure at Hjaltadans in Fetlar, but its purpose is unknown.

There is a massive ruined structure on the north shore of Grunay known locally as "the broch" although it is not known if it dates from the Iron Age, when such structures were built throughout the far north of Scotland. The name "Benelips" possibly originating from the Old Norse bon meaning "to pray" hints at the existence of an early Christian hermitage on these remote islets.

Dey (1991) speculates that the folklore of the troll-like trows, and perhaps that of the selkie may be based in part on the Norse arrival of the Norse settlers. She states that the conquest by the Vikings sent the indigenous, dark-haired Picts into hiding and that "many stories exist in Shetland of these strange people, smaller and darker than the tall, blond Vikings who, having been driven off their land into sea caves, emerged at night to steal from the new land owners." The skerry of Trollsholm and its cleft of Trolli Geo indicate the presence of this folklore on Out Skerries.

=== Historic period ===
The Out Skerries have been permanently inhabited from the Norse period onwards.

There are a number of shipwrecks around the islands include the Dutch vessels Kennemerland (1664) and De Liefde (1711); and North Wind (1906), which was carrying wood which was salvaged and used by the islanders for their houses. Some of the gold from these wrecks was found in 1960. The wrecks of the Kennemerland and the Danish warship Wrangles Palais (1687) lie within a Historic Marine Protected Area.

Due to their remote and rugged nature, the islanders were accused of smuggling and wrecking. Tammy Tyrie's Hidey Hol was used by islanders to avoid press gangs.

Until the early 20th century, a lot of sea (haaf) fishing was conducted from traditional fishing boats known as sixareens.

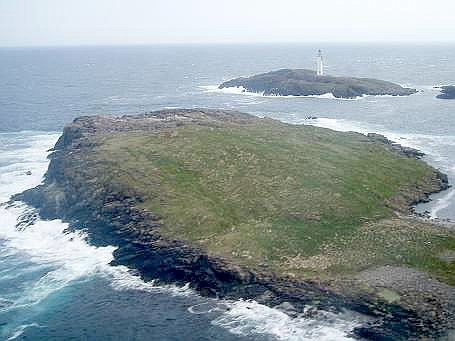
An aerial view of Grunay, which was evacuated during World War II, with Bound Skerry and its lighthouse in the background.

=== World War II ===
Being so close to Norway, the islands were of strategic importance in World War II and were a regular landfall for Norwegian boats carrying escapees from the Nazi occupation. The local coastguard was responsible for the refugees, and at one point during the war were issued with a tommy gun, although initially no-one knew how to use it. German planes frequently flew over at low altitudes, strafing the Grunay lighthouse shore station in 1941 and dropping a bomb in 1942. The latter attack killed Mary Anderson, the only local casualty of the war, and Grunay was evacuated soon afterwards. A month later, a Canadian bomber crashed on Grunay, and in 1990 a plaque was raised to commemorate that event. Dey (1991) states that the bomber was a "British" Blenheim bomber with a crew of two Canadians and one Englishman. The plaque ceremony was attended by the family of F/Sgt Jay Oliver, one of the two Canadian casualties, and Peter Johnson, a local man who had witnessed the crash aged eight years. During the war, an official letter was sent in secret to the local sub-postmistress with instructions that it be opened in the event of a German invasion. After the war, it was returned, unopened.

== Island life ==
Around 35 people live on the two main islands, Housay and Bruray, just east of the main Shetland Islands group. A third island, Grunay, is currently uninhabited. The two main islands are linked by a bridge. There are two shops, an airstrip, a church on Housay, a police station, a fish processing factory, and a community hall where dances are held (especially for the celebration for the annual Lerwick to Skerries Yacht Race held in August). The islands are famous for wildlife, with frequent sightings of rare birds. There is little peat on the Out Skerries, so the residents have been granted rights to cut it on Whalsay. The soil in the islands is thin and infertile, but is heaped into riggs, for better cultivation of potatoes, carrots and swedes. The main industry on the islands is fishing. There is still some sheep farming, but it is far less important than it once was. Tourism on the other hand has increased.

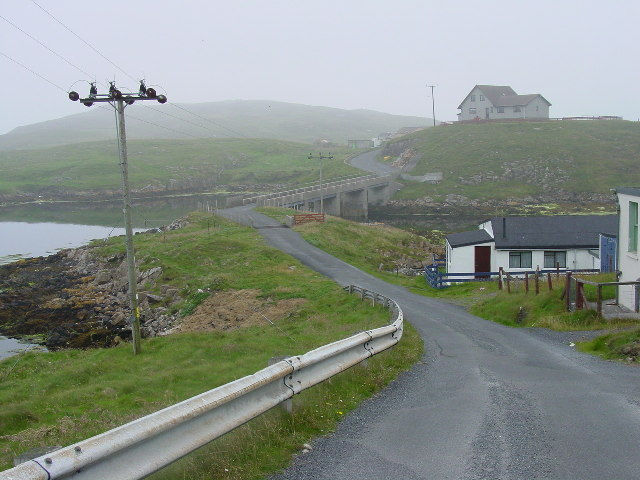
Road connecting Bruray to Housay (foreground)

The islands have a (mothballed) primary school. The primary school in 2015 had just one pupil. The previously open secondary school was the smallest in the UK; in 2010, the school had only three students. This secondary school was closed in 2014 with the approval of the Scottish government. In 2016, the school only had one student. The story went viral and he received 10,000 Christmas cards that year from all around the world.

The old schoolhouse found reuse as the second-smallest cinema in the UK (the smallest in Scotland), called Schoolhouse Cinema, which opened in 2017 and offers free admissions and free snacks.

== Transport ==
- The Skerries Bridge, which links Bruray to Housay, was built in 1957, replacing the first bridge built in 1899.
- There is around a mile of road, along which most of the population lives.
- There is a ferry to the islands from Vidlin and Lerwick.
- There is a small airstrip on Bruray.

== See also ==
- List of islands of Scotland
