= Shetland =

Archipelago in Scotland

Shetland (Shaetlan)
- Flag Coat of arms

Location

- Location within Scotland
- OS grid reference: HU4363
- Coordinates: 60°20′N 1°20′W; ISO Code: GB-ZET

Name
- Name meaning: 'Hiltland'
- Old Norse name: Hjaltland

Physical geography
- Island group: Northern Isles
- Area: 1,467 km^{2} (566 sq mi)
- Highest elevation: Ronas Hill 450 m (1,480 ft)

Administration
- Council area: Shetland Islands Council
- Country: Scotland
- Sovereign state: United Kingdom

Demographics
- Population: 22,710 (2025)
- Population density: 15/km^{2} (39/sq mi)
- Largest settlement: Lerwick

Shetland, (Note: English: /ˈʃɛtlənd/, in Shaetlan /'ʃe̞tlənd/) also called the Shetland Islands, is an archipelago in Scotland lying between Orkney, the Faroe Islands, and Norway, marking the northernmost region of the United Kingdom. The islands lie about 50 miles (80 kilometres) to the northeast of Orkney, 110 mi (170 km) from mainland Scotland, and 140 mi (220 km) west of Norway.

They form part of the border between the Atlantic Ocean to the west and the North Sea to the east. The islands' area is 1,467 km^{2} (566 sq mi) and the population totalled 22,710 in 2025. The islands comprise the Shetland Islands constituency of the Scottish Parliament. The islands' administrative centre, largest settlement and only burgh is Lerwick, which has been the capital of Shetland since 1708, before which time the capital was Scalloway. Due to its location, it is accessible only by ferry or flight with an airport located in Sumburgh as well as a port and emergency airstrip in Lerwick.

The archipelago has an oceanic climate, complex geology, rugged coastline, and many low, rolling hills. The largest island, known as "the Mainland", has an area of 373 sq mi (967 km^{2}), and is the fifth-largest island in the British Isles. It is one of 16 inhabited islands in Shetland.

Humans have lived in Shetland since the Mesolithic period. Norse settlement began in the late 8th and 9th centuries, after which Shetland became integrated into the Norwegian realm and remained under Norwegian sovereignty until it was annexed by Scotland in 1472. The Norse heritage of the isles is reflected in the Up Helly Aa fire festivals and a strong musical tradition, especially the traditional fiddle style. Shetland retains a strong identity. Adam Grydehøj writes that most Shetlanders identify as Shetlanders rather than as Scots, and that Norse and Viking heritage continues to play an important role in the community's self-image. Andrew Jennings similarly describes Shetlanders as maintaining a distinctive identity. Almost all place names in the islands have Norse origin. The islands' prose writers and poets have often written in the distinctive Shetland dialect of the Scots language. Many areas on the islands have been set aside to protect the local fauna and flora, including a number of important seabird nesting sites. The Shetland pony and Shetland Sheepdog are two well-known Shetland animal breeds. Other animals with local breeds include the Shetland sheep, cow, goose, and duck. The Shetland pig, or grice, has been extinct since about 1930.

== Etymology ==
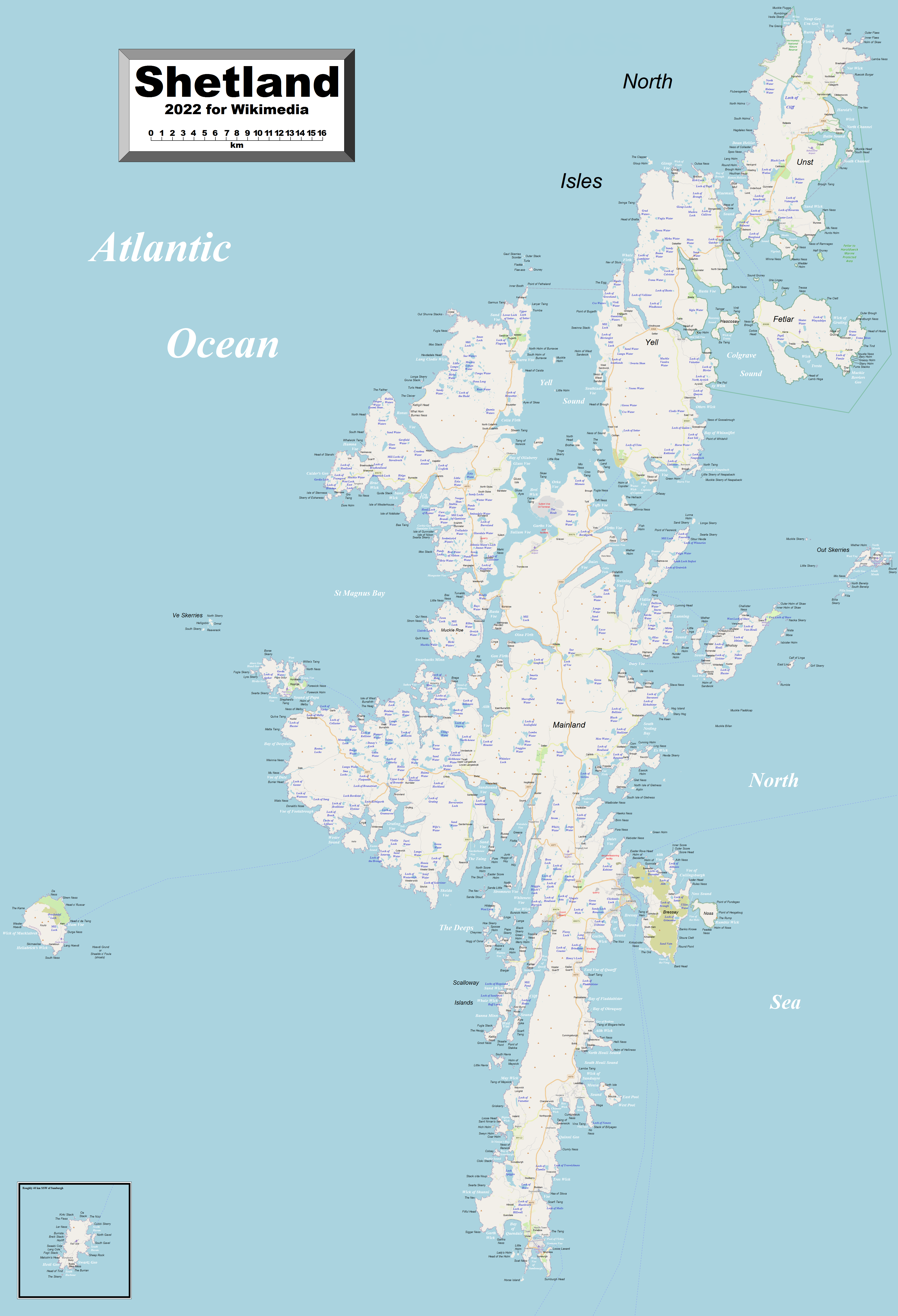
Detailed map of Shetland, labelling many place names

The name Shetland may derive from the Old Norse words hjalt ('hilt'), and land ('land'), the popular and traditional claim. Another possibility is that the first syllable is derived from the name of an ancient Celtic tribe. Andrew Jennings has suggested a link with the Caledones.

In AD 43, the Roman author Pomponius Mela made reference in his writing to seven islands he called the Haemodae. In AD 77, Pliny the Elder called these same lands the Acmodae. Scholars have inferred that both of these references are to islands in the Shetland group. Another possible early written reference to the islands is Tacitus' report in Agricola in AD 98. After he described the Roman discovery and conquest of Orkney, he added that the Roman fleet had seen "Thule, too". (Note: Watson (1926) is sure that Tacitus was referring to Shetland, although David Breeze (2002) is more sceptical. The name Thule was mentioned by Pytheas of Massilia when he described visiting Britain sometime between 322 and 285 BC, but it is unlikely he was referring to Shetland, because he also wrote that he believed Thule was a six-day sail north of Britain and a one-day sail from "the frozen sea".)

In early Irish literature, Shetland is referred to as Insi Catt — "the Isles of Cats" (meaning the island inhabited by the tribe called Cat). This may have been the pre-Norse inhabitants' name for the islands. Cat was the name of a Pictish people who occupied parts of the northern Scottish mainland (see Kingdom of Cat); and their name survives in the names of the county of Caithness and in the Scottish Gaelic name for Sutherland, Cataibh, which means "among the Cats".

The oldest known version of the modern name Shetland is Hetland; this may represent "Catland", the Germanic language softening the C- to H- according to Grimm's law (also coinciding with Jennings' hypothesis for the early sound shift necessary for descent from *kalid- to *halit-, from Caledones). It occurs in a letter written by Harald, earl of Orkney, Shetland and Caithness, in ca. 1190. By 1431, the islands were being referred to as Hetland, after various intermediate transformations. It is possible that the Pictish "cat" sound contributed to this Norse name. In the 16th century, Shetland was called Hjaltland. (Note: As with all western dialects of Norse, the stressed a shifts to e and so the ja became je as with Norse hjalpa which became hjelpa. Then the pronunciation changed through a process of reverse lenition of the initial /hj/ to /ʃ/. This is also found in some Norwegian dialects, for example in the word hjå ("with") and the place names Hjerkinn and Sjoa (meaning from *Hjó). Lastly, the l before the t disappeared.)

Gradually, the Scandinavian Norn language spoken by the inhabitants of the islands was replaced by the Shetland dialect of Scots and Hjaltland became Ȝetland. The initial letter is the Middle Scots letter, yogh, the pronunciation of which is almost identical to the original Norn sound, /hj/. When the use of the letter yogh was discontinued, it was often replaced by the similar-looking letter z (which at the time was usually rendered with a curled tail: ⟨ʒ⟩) hence Zetland, the form used in the name of the pre-1975 county council. This is the source of the ZE postcode used for Shetland.

Most of the islands have Norse names, although the derivations of some may be pre-Norse, Pictish or even pre-Celtic.

== Geography and geology ==
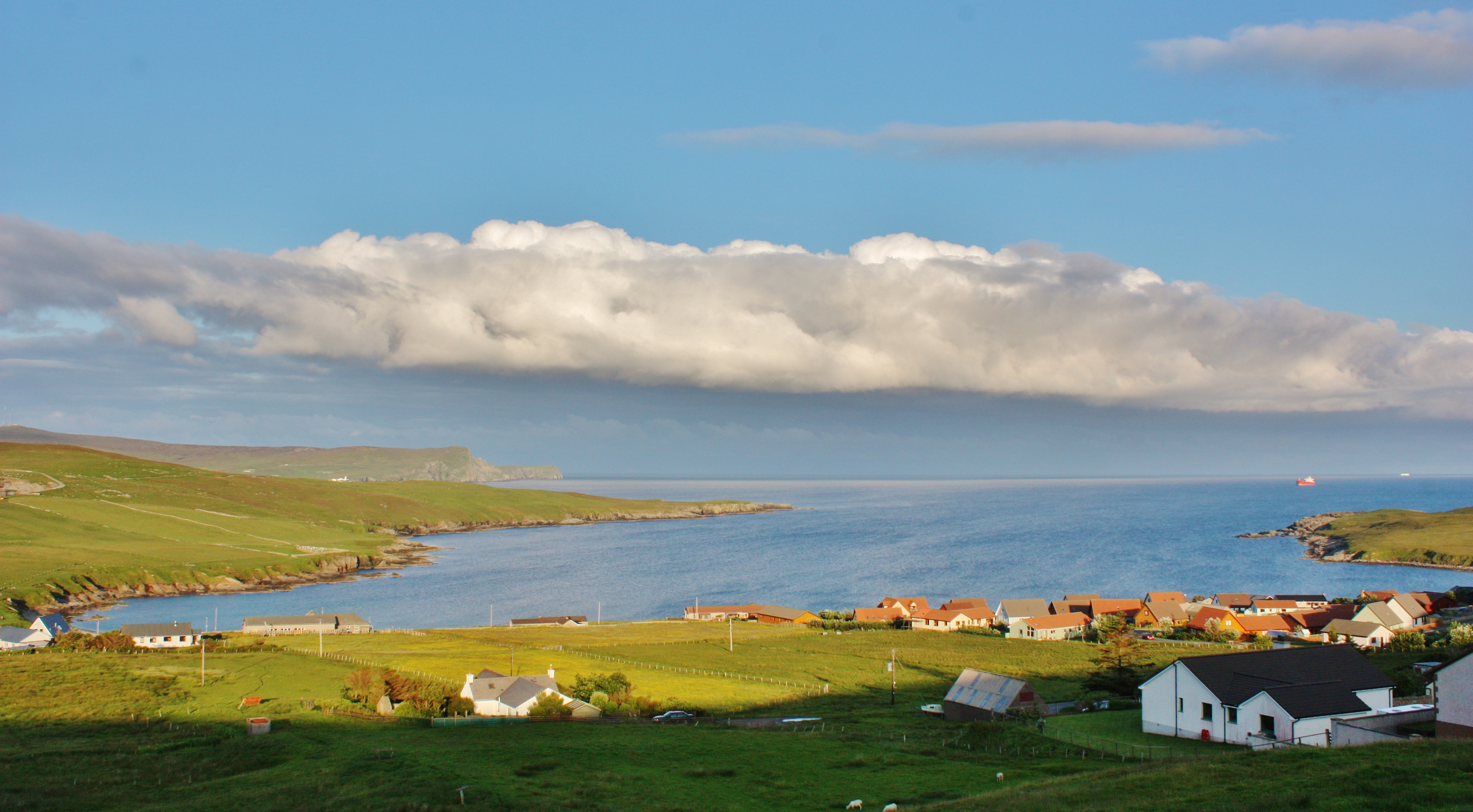
Mainland, view of the village Gulberwick.

Satellite image of Shetland

Shetland is around 106 miles (170 kilometres) north of Great Britain and 143 mi (230 km) west of Bergen, Norway. It covers an area of 567 sq mi (1,468 km^{2}) and has a coastline 1,679 mi (2,702 km) long.

Lerwick, the capital and largest settlement, has a population of 6,958. About half of the archipelago's total population of 22,920 people live within 10 mi (16 km) of the town.

Scalloway on the west coast, which was the capital until 1708, has a population of fewer than 1,000 people.

Only 16 of about 100 islands are inhabited. The main island of the group is known as Mainland. The next largest are Yell, Unst, and Fetlar, which lie to the north, and Bressay and Whalsay, which lie to the east. East and West Burra, Muckle Roe, Papa Stour, Trondra, and Vaila are smaller islands to the west of Mainland. The other inhabited islands are Foula 17 mi (28 km) west of Walls, Fair Isle 24 mi (38 km) south-west of Sumburgh Head, and the Out Skerries to the east. (Note: Shetland Islands Council state there are 15 inhabited islands, and count East and West Burra, which are joined by a bridge, as a single unit. Out Skerries has two inhabited islands: Housay and Bruray.)

The uninhabited islands include Mousa, known for the Broch of Mousa, the finest preserved example of an Iron Age broch; Noss to the east of Bressay, which has been a national nature reserve since 1955; St Ninian's Isle, connected to Mainland by the largest active tombolo in the United Kingdom; and Out Stack, the northernmost point of the British Isles. Shetland's location means that it provides a number of such records: Muness is the most northerly castle in the United Kingdom and Skaw the most northerly settlement.

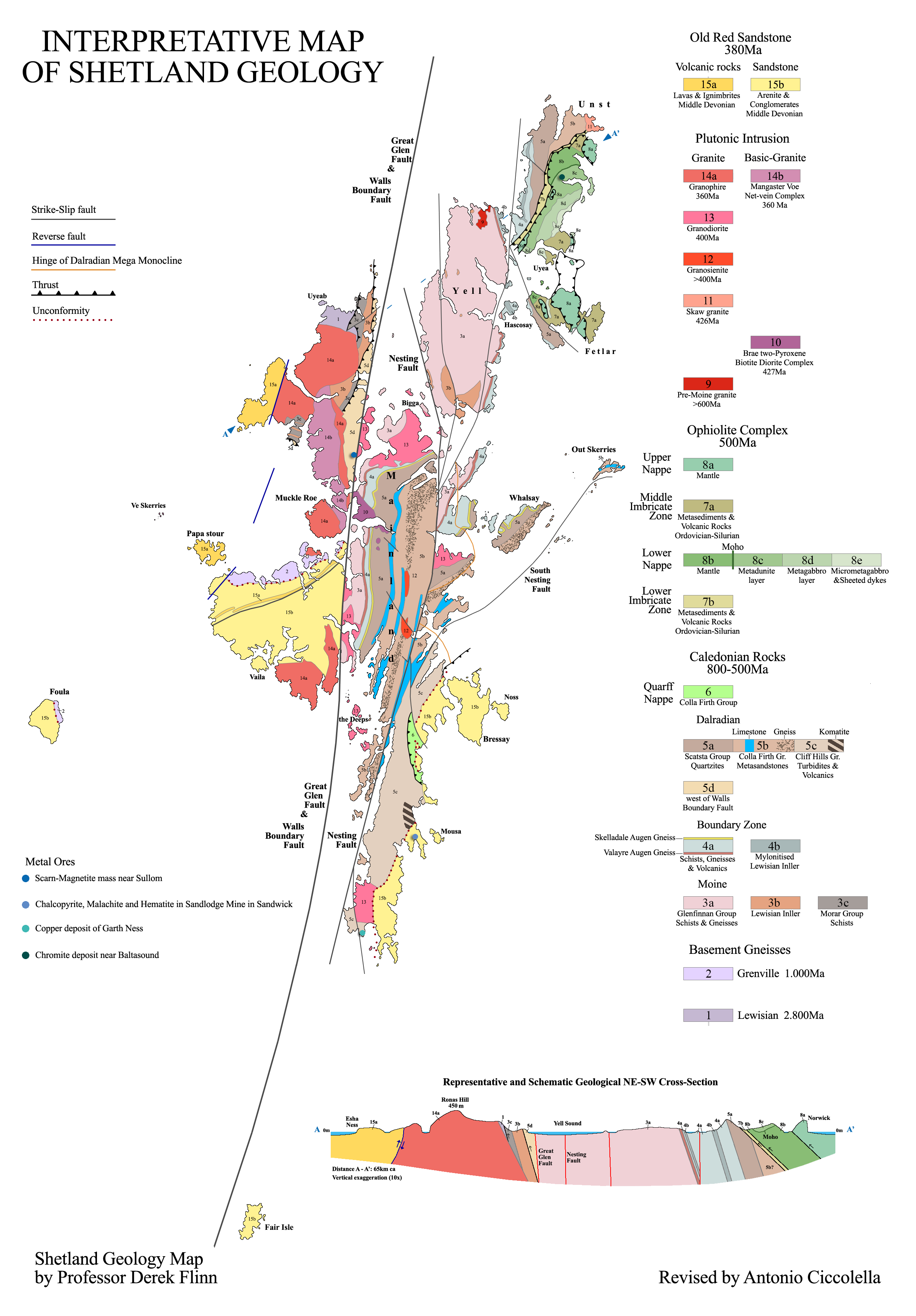
Shetland geological map

The geology of Shetland is complex, with numerous faults and fold axes. These islands are the northern outpost of the Caledonian orogeny, and there are outcrops of Lewisian, Dalradian and Moine metamorphic rocks with histories similar to their equivalents on the Scottish mainland. There are also Old Red Sandstone deposits and granite intrusions. The most distinctive feature is the ophiolite in Unst and Fetlar which is a remnant of the Iapetus Ocean floor made up of ultrabasic peridotite and gabbro.

Much of Shetland's economy depends on the oil-bearing sediments in the surrounding seas. Geological evidence shows that in around 6100 BC a tsunami caused by the Storegga Slide hit Shetland, as well as the west coast of Norway, and may have created a wave of up to 25 m (82 ft) high in the voes where modern populations are highest.

The highest point of Shetland is Ronas Hill at 450 m (1,480 ft). The Pleistocene glaciations entirely covered the islands. During that period, the Stanes of Stofast, a 2000-tonne glacial erratic, came to rest on a prominent hilltop in Lunnasting.

It has been estimated that there are about 275 sea stacks in Scotland of which some 110 are around the coasts of Shetland. For many of them, there is no record of any attempt by rock climbers to ascend them.

Shetland is a national scenic area which, unusually, includes some discrete locations: Fair Isle, Foula, South West Mainland (including the Scalloway Islands), Muckle Roe, Esha Ness, Fethaland and Herma Ness. The total area covered by the designation is 41,833 ha, of which 26,347 ha is marine (i.e. below low tide).

In October 2018, legislation came into force in Scotland to prevent public bodies, without good reason, showing Shetland in a separate box in maps, as had often been the practice. The legislation requires the islands to be "displayed in a manner that accurately and proportionately represents their geographical location in relation to the rest of Scotland", so as make clear the islands' real distance from other areas.

=== Climate ===
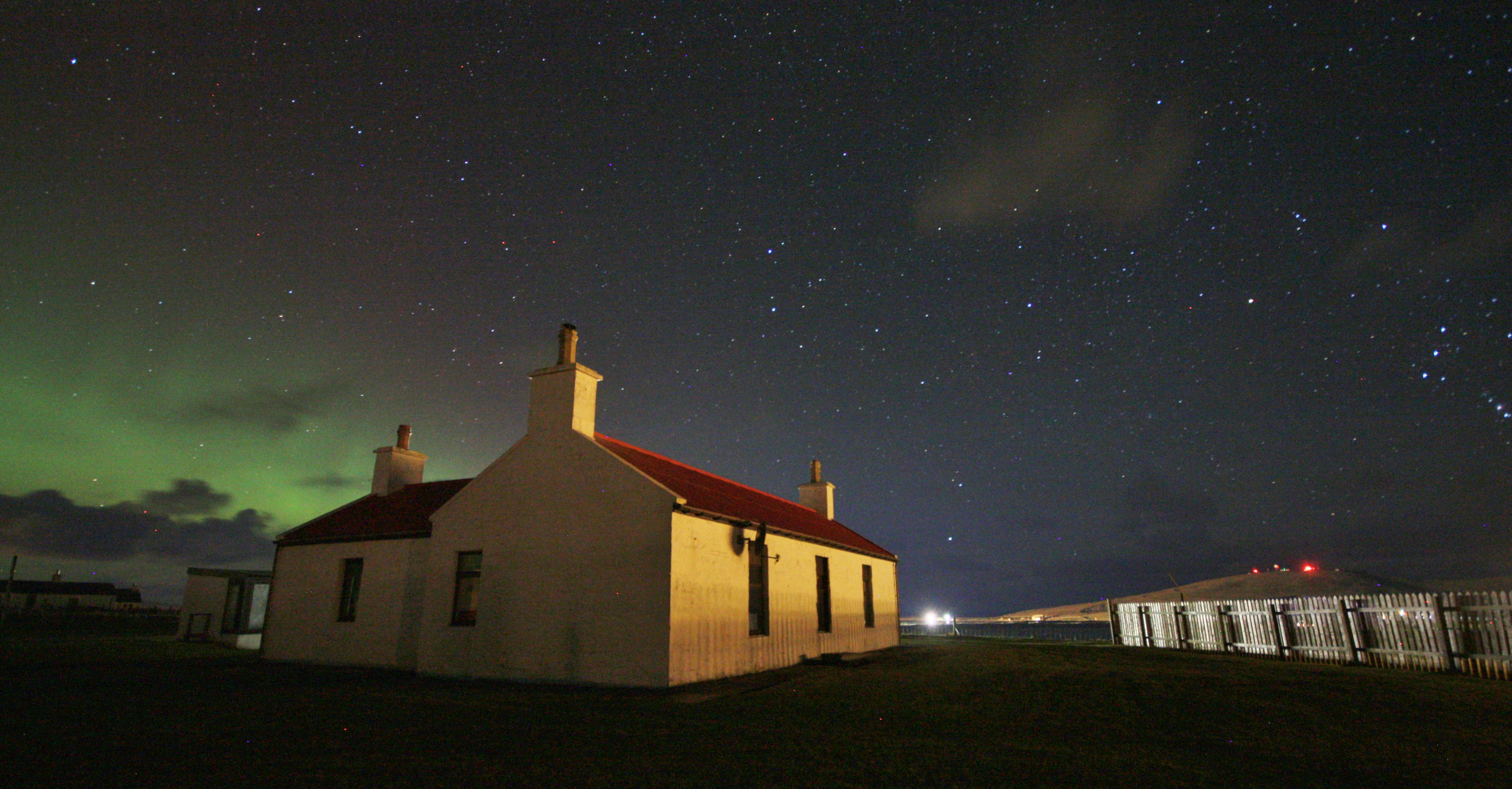
Aurora in Scatness

Shetland has an oceanic temperate maritime climate (Köppen: Cfb), bordering on, but very slightly above average in summer temperatures, the subpolar variety, with long, relatively mild winters and short cool summers. The climate all year round is moderate owing to the influence of the surrounding seas, with average night-time low temperatures a little above 1 °C (34 °F) in January and February and average daytime high temperatures of near 14 °C (57 °F) in July and August. The highest temperature on record was 27.8 °C (82.0 °F) on 6 August 1910 at Sumburgh Head and the lowest −8.9 °C (16.0 °F) in the Januaries of 1952 and 1959.

The general character of the climate is windy, cloudy and often wet, with at least 2 mm (0.08 in) of rain falling on more than 250 days a year. Average yearly precipitation is 1,252 mm (49.3 in), with November through January the wettest months, averaging 5.6 to 5.9 inches of precipitation, mostly rain. Snowfall is usually confined to the period November to February, and snow seldom lies on the ground for more than a day.

Snow generally falls in the form of cumulonimbus showers produced by the resultant instability when sea-surface temperatures are warm relative to colder air aloft. Snow very rarely, if ever, falls steady for prolonged periods. Somewhat less precipitation falls from April to July, although on average, no month receives less than 50 mm (2.0 in). Fog is common during summer due to the cooling effect of the sea on mild southerly airmasses.

Because of the islands' latitude, on clear winter nights the northern lights can sometimes be seen in the sky, while in summer there is almost perpetual daylight, a state of affairs known locally as the "simmer dim". Annual bright sunshine averages 1110 hours, and overcast days are common.

Climate data for Shetland Isles (S. Screen), (Note: Weather station is located 1.7 miles (2.7 km) from the Lerwick port centre.) elevation 82 m (269 ft), 1991–2020 normals, extremes 1930–present
Month	Jan	Feb	Mar	Apr	May	Jun	Jul	Aug	Sep	Oct	Nov	Dec	Year
Record high °C (°F)	12.8 (55.0)	11.7 (53.1)	13.3 (55.9)	16.1 (61.0)	20.7 (69.3)	22.2 (72.0)	25.8 (78.4)	22.1 (71.8)	19.4 (66.9)	17.2 (63.0)	13.9 (57.0)	12.6 (54.7)	25.8 (78.4)
Mean daily maximum °C (°F)	6.1 (43.0)	5.8 (42.4)	6.7 (44.1)	8.3 (46.9)	10.6 (51.1)	12.6 (54.7)	14.4 (57.9)	14.7 (58.5)	13.0 (55.4)	10.4 (50.7)	8.1 (46.6)	6.6 (43.9)	9.8 (49.6)
Daily mean °C (°F)	4.1 (39.4)	3.8 (38.8)	4.6 (40.3)	6.1 (43.0)	8.1 (46.6)	10.3 (50.5)	12.2 (54.0)	12.6 (54.7)	11.1 (52.0)	8.5 (47.3)	6.2 (43.2)	4.5 (40.1)	7.7 (45.9)
Mean daily minimum °C (°F)	2.2 (36.0)	1.8 (35.2)	2.4 (36.3)	3.8 (38.8)	5.6 (42.1)	8.1 (46.6)	10.1 (50.2)	10.5 (50.9)	9.1 (48.4)	6.6 (43.9)	4.3 (39.7)	2.5 (36.5)	5.3 (41.5)
Record low °C (°F)	−8.9 (16.0)	−7.4 (18.7)	−8.3 (17.1)	−5.7 (21.7)	−2.2 (28.0)	−0.6 (30.9)	3.5 (38.3)	2.8 (37.0)	−0.6 (30.9)	−3.3 (26.1)	−5.7 (21.7)	−8.2 (17.2)	−8.9 (16.0)
Average precipitation mm (inches)	150.4 (5.92)	122.7 (4.83)	109.2 (4.30)	67.8 (2.67)	56.9 (2.24)	59.8 (2.35)	67.7 (2.67)	88.6 (3.49)	105.8 (4.17)	130.6 (5.14)	143.2 (5.64)	149.7 (5.89)	1,252.3 (49.30)
Average precipitation days (≥ 1.0 mm)	22.0	19.2	19.3	14.7	11.7	11.5	12.1	13.1	16.1	20.3	21.5	22.6	204.1
Average snowy days	10	9	9	5	1	0	0	0	0	1	5	8	48
Average relative humidity (%)	87	86	86	87	88	89	90	91	90	89	87	87	89
Mean monthly sunshine hours	27.4	57.6	97.7	141.2	191.9	147.7	128.6	132.4	99.5	75.1	38.3	20.6	1,158
Source 1: Met Office NOAA (relative humidity and snow days 1961–1990)
Source 2: KNMI

== Settlements ==
The largest settlements in Shetland

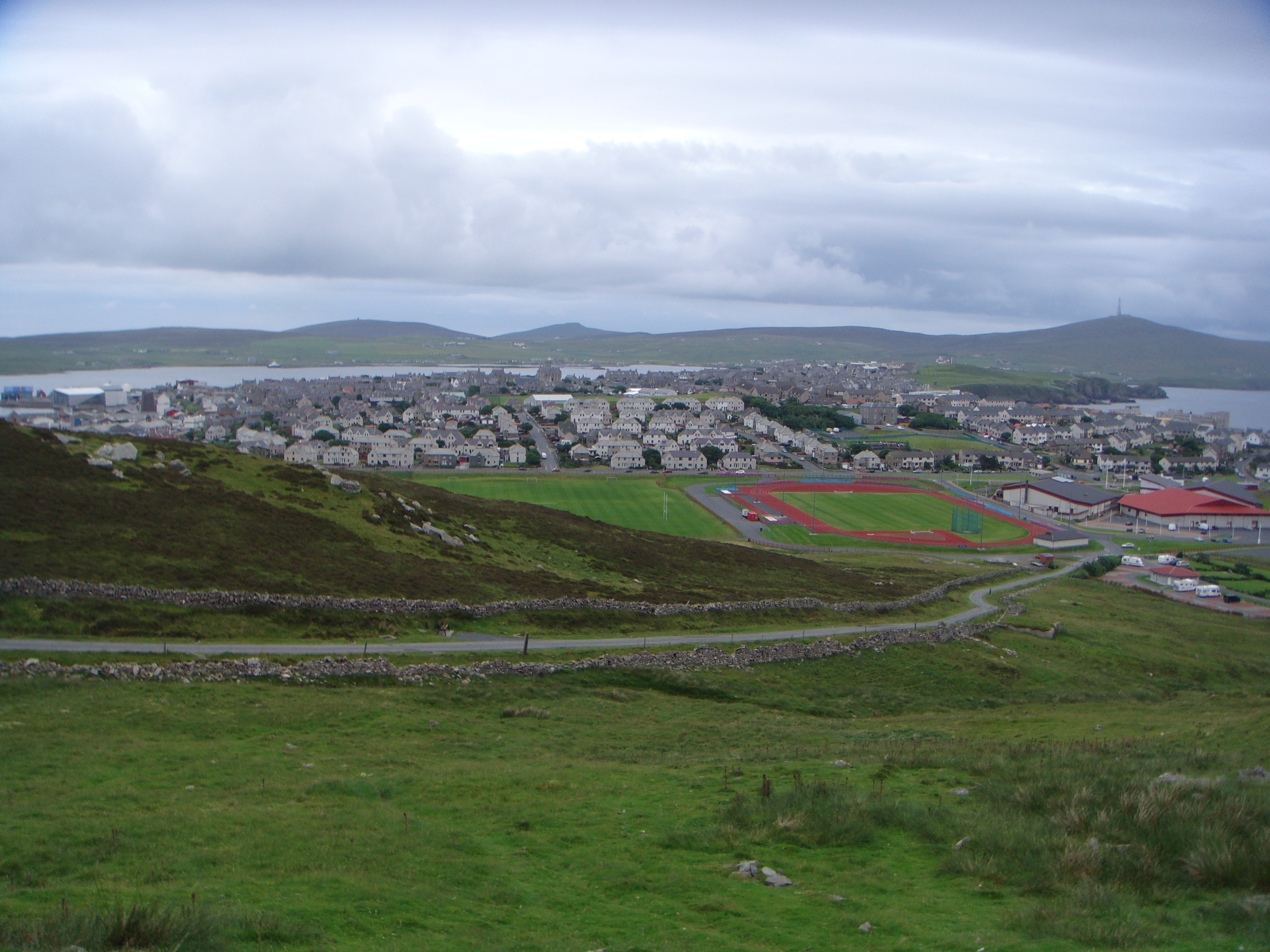
Lerwick is Shetland's largest settlement.

There are only three settlements with a population over 500, being the town of Lerwick and the villages of Scalloway and Brae.

Settlement	Population (2020)
Lerwick	6,760
Scalloway	1,170
Brae	750

For town planning purposes, Shetland Islands Council has identified eight 'Tier 1' settlements, being areas with the greatest concentration of services and facilities. They are the three settlements in the table above, plus Aith, Baltasound, Mid Yell, Sandwick, and Symbister.

List of inhabited islands and their populations:

Island	Population			
Island	1991	2001	2011	2022
Shetland Mainland	17,562	17,550	18,765	18,763
Whalsay	1,041	1,034	1,061	1,005
Yell	1,075	957	966	904
West Burra	817	753	776	772
Unst	1,055	720	632	644
Bressay	352	384	368	345
Trondra	117	133	135	152
Muckle Roe	115	104	130	128
East Burra	72	66	76	105
Fair Isle	67	69	68	44
Fetlar	90	86	61	66
Housay	58	50	50	21
Foula	40	31	38	17
Bruray	27	26	24	16
Papa Stour	33	23	15	7
Vaila	1	2	2	3

== Prehistory ==
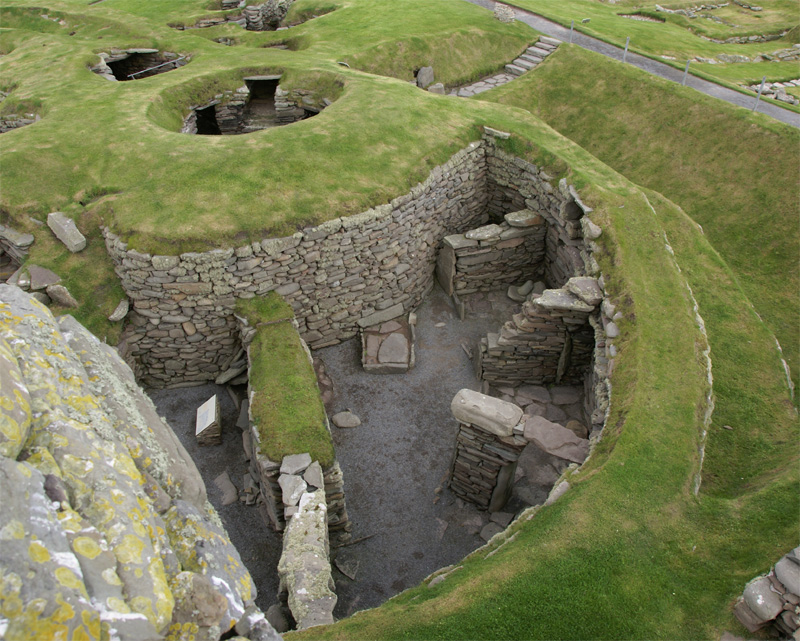
The preserved ruins of a wheelhouse and broch at Jarlshof, described as "one of the most remarkable archaeological sites ever excavated in the British Isles"

Due to the practice, dating to at least the early Neolithic, of building in stone on virtually treeless islands, Shetland is extremely rich in physical remains of the prehistoric eras and there are over 5,000 archaeological sites all told. A midden site at West Voe on the south coast of Mainland, dated to 4320–4030 BC, has provided the first evidence of Mesolithic human activity in Shetland. The same site provides dates for early Neolithic activity and finds at Scord of Brouster in Walls have been dated to 3400 BC. (Note: The Scord of Brouster site includes a cluster of six or seven walled fields and three stone circular houses that contains the earliest hoe-blades found so far in Scotland.) "Shetland knives" are stone tools that date from this period made from felsite from Northmavine.

Pottery shards found at the important site of Jarlshof also indicate that there was Neolithic activity there although the main settlement dates from the Bronze Age. This includes a smithy, a cluster of wheelhouses and a later broch. The site has provided evidence of habitation during various phases right up until Viking times. Heel-shaped cairns, are a style of chambered cairn unique to Shetland, with a particularly large example in Vementry.

Numerous brochs were erected during the Iron Age. In addition to Mousa there are significant ruins at Clickimin, Culswick, Old Scatness and West Burrafirth, although their origin and purpose is a matter of some controversy. Recent archaeological interpretation has suggested a substantial demographic break before Norse settlement. Allen Fraser argues that agricultural activity at Old Scatness ended during the Late Iron Age/Pictish period and did not resume until the Norse period, suggesting that Shetland may have been without any significant population for more than a century before Norse reuse of the site.

Hunter (2000) states in relation to King Bridei I of the Picts in the sixth century AD: "As for Shetland, Orkney, Skye and the Western Isles, their inhabitants, most of whom appear to have been Pictish in culture and speech at this time, are likely to have regarded Bridei as a fairly distant presence". In 2011, the collective site, "The Crucible of Iron Age Shetland", including Broch of Mousa, Old Scatness and Jarlshof, joined the UKs "Tentative List" of World Heritage Sites.

In the Pictish period, the Papar, monks of Irish and Scottish origin, established eremitic communities on islands in Shetland. They brought with them improved manuring practices that enriched and deepened local soils to support the cultivation of barley and oats.

== History ==
=== Scandinavian colonisation ===
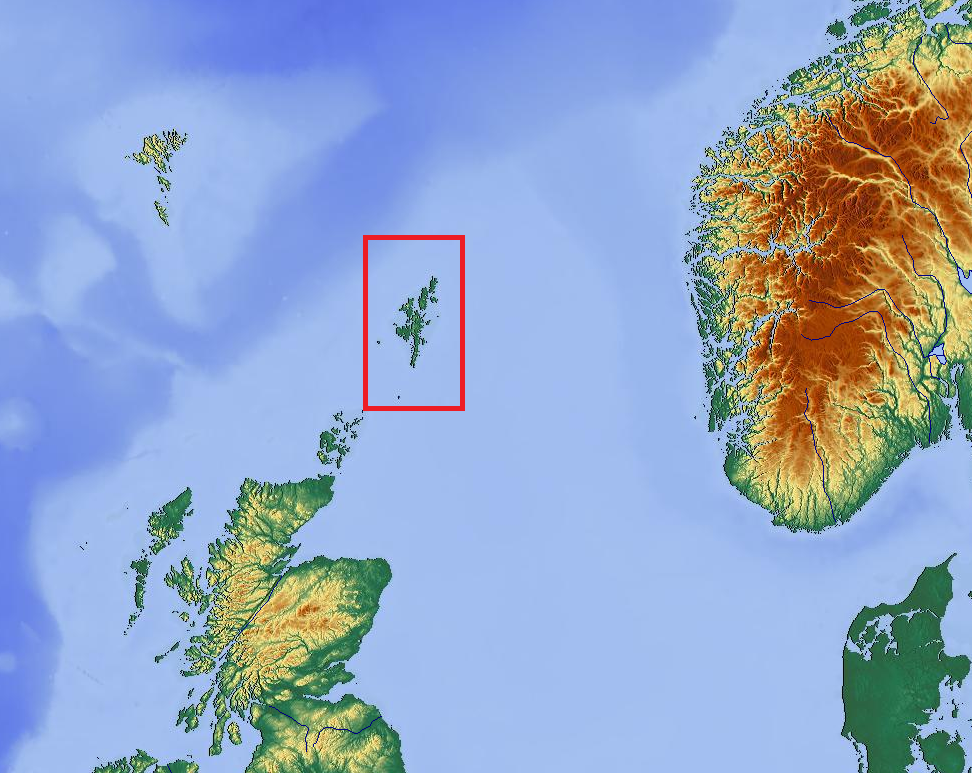
Shetland (boxed) in relation to surrounding territories including Norway (to the east), the Faroe Islands (to the north west), and Orkney and the rest of the British Isles (to the south west)

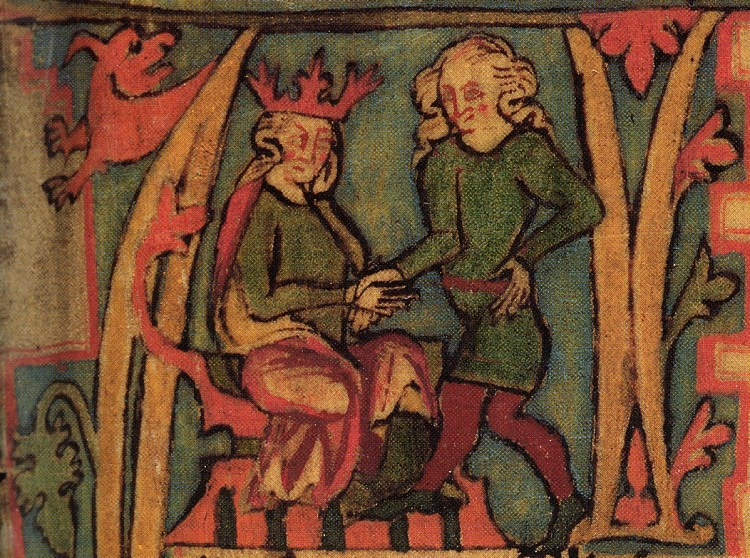
14th-century Flateyjarbók image of Harald Fairhair (right, with fair hair), who took control of Hjaltland c. 875

The expanding population of Scandinavia led to a shortage of available resources and arable land there and led to a period of Viking expansion, so the Norse gradually shifted their attention from plundering to invasion. Shetland was colonised by Norse settlers during the late 8th and 9th centuries, but the fate of the preceding population remains unresolved. There is no established archaeological evidence that Norse settlement involved violent extermination. David Griffiths notes that little or no evidence has been identified for the destruction or raiding of pre-Viking churches or settlements in Shetland and Orkney.

Modern Shetlanders still retain the Norse DNA with many family trees showing the Norse patronymic system (-sson/son, -dottir/daughter). Modern DNA studies such as the Viking Health Study are considered to be severely flawed as they account for only a tiny fraction of the population.

Vikings used the islands as a base for pirate expeditions to Norway and the coasts of mainland Scotland. In response, Norwegian king Harald Hårfagre ("Harald Fair Hair") annexed the Northern Isles (comprising Orkney and Shetland) in 875. (Note: Some scholars believe that this story, which appears in the Orkneyinga Saga is apocryphal and based on the later voyages of Magnus Barelegs.) Rognvald Eysteinsson received the Earldom of Orkney, which then included Shetland, from Harald as reparation for the death of his son in battle in Scotland, and then passed the earldom on to his brother Sigurd the Mighty. Sigurd went on to conquer further territory; by the time of his death in 892, the earldom of Orkney stretched from Shetland down to Caithness and Sutherland on mainland Britain.

The islands converted to Christianity in the late 10th century. King Olaf I Tryggvason summoned the jarl Sigurd the Stout during a visit to Orkney and said, "I order you and all your subjects to be baptised. If you refuse, I'll have you killed on the spot and I swear I will ravage every island with fire and steel". Sigurd agreed, and the islands became Christian.

The Scottish crown claimed the overlordship of the Caithness and Sutherland area from Norway in 1098. The jarls thereafter owed allegiance to the Scottish crown for their territory on mainland Britain, which they held as the Mormaer of Caithness, but owed allegiance to the Norwegian crown for Orkney and Shetland.

In 1194, when Harald Maddadsson was Earl of Orkney, a rebellion broke out against King Sverre Sigurdsson of Norway. The Eyjarskeggjar ("Island Beards") sailed for Norway but were beaten in the Battle of Florvåg near Bergen. After his victory, King Sverre placed Shetland under direct Norwegian rule in 1195 as the 'Lordship of Shetland', removing it from the earldom of Orkney.

=== Increased Scottish interest ===
From the mid-13th century onwards Scottish monarchs increasingly sought to take control of the islands surrounding their seas. The process was begun in earnest by Alexander II and was continued by his successor Alexander III. This strategy eventually led to an invasion of Scotland by Haakon IV Haakonsson, King of Norway. His fleet assembled in Bressay Sound before sailing for Scotland. After the stalemate of the Battle of Largs, Haakon retreated to Orkney, where he died in December 1263, entertained on his deathbed by recitations of the sagas. His death halted any further Norwegian expansion in Scotland and following this ill-fated expedition, the Hebrides and Mann were yielded to the Kingdom of Scotland as a result of the 1266 Treaty of Perth, although the Scots recognised continuing Norwegian sovereignty over Orkney and Shetland.

=== Absorption by Scotland ===
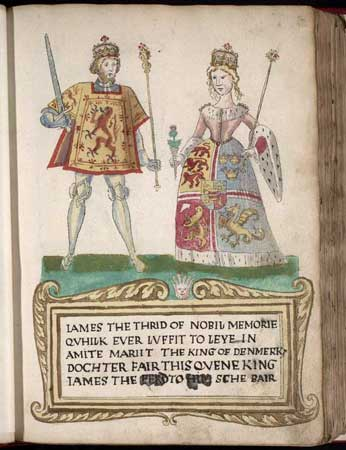
James III and Margaret of Denmark, whose betrothal led to Shetland passing from Norway to Scotland

In the 14th century, Orkney and Shetland remained Norwegian possessions, but Scottish influence was growing. Jon Haraldsson, who was murdered in Thurso in 1231, was the last of an unbroken line of Norse jarls, and thereafter the earls were Scots noblemen of the houses of Angus and St Clair. On the death of Haakon VI in 1380, Norway formed a political union with Denmark, after which the interest of the royal house in the islands declined. In 1468 Orkney, and in 1469 Shetland, were pledged by Christian I, in his capacity as King of Norway, as security for the unpaid dowry of his daughter Margaret on her marriage to James III of Scotland. The arrangements included a right of redemption, and Christian had acted without consulting the Norwegian Council of the Realm. Christian's successors continued to regard the arrangement as redeemable, and later Danish rulers made repeated attempts to recover the islands, including offers to pay the redemption sum.

In 1470, William Sinclair, 1st Earl of Caithness, ceded his title to James III, and the following year the Northern Isles were directly absorbed by the Crown of Scotland, an action confirmed by the Parliament of Scotland in 1472. Nonetheless, Shetland's connection with Norway has proved to be enduring. (Note: After Norway became independent again in 1905, the Shetland authorities sent a letter to King Haakon VII in which they stated: "Today no 'foreign' flag is more familiar or more welcome in our voes and havens than that of Norway, and Shetlanders continue to look upon Norway as their mother-land, and recall with pride and affection the time when their forefathers were under the rule of the Kings of Norway".)

From the early 15th century onward Shetlanders sold their goods through the Hanseatic League of German merchantmen. The Hansa would buy shiploads of salted fish, wool and butter, and import salt, cloth, beer and other goods. The late 16th century and early 17th century were dominated by the influence of the despotic Robert Stewart, Earl of Orkney, who was granted the islands by his half-sister Mary Queen of Scots, and his son Patrick. The latter commenced the building of Scalloway Castle, but after his imprisonment in 1609, the Crown annexed Orkney and Shetland again until 1643, when Charles I granted them to William Douglas, 7th Earl of Morton. These rights were held on and off by the Mortons until 1766, when they were sold by James Douglas, 14th Earl of Morton to Laurence Dundas.

=== 18th and 19th centuries ===
The trade with the North German towns lasted until the Act of Union 1707, after which high salt duties prevented the German merchants from trading with Shetland. Shetland then went into an economic depression, as the local traders were not as skilled in trading salted fish. However, some local merchant-lairds took up where the German merchants had left off, and fitted out their own ships to export fish from Shetland to the Continent. For the independent farmers of Shetland this had negative consequences, as they now had to fish for these merchant-lairds.

Population increased to a maximum of 31,670 in 1861. However, British rule came at a price for many ordinary people as well as traders. The Shetlanders' nautical skills were sought by the Royal Navy. Some 3,000 served during the Napoleonic Wars from 1800 to 1815 and press gangs were rife. During this period 120 men were taken from Fetlar alone, and only 20 of them returned home. By the late 19th century 90% of all Shetland was owned by just 32 people, and between 1861 and 1881 more than 8,000 Shetlanders emigrated. With the passing of the Crofters' Holdings (Scotland) Act 1886 the Liberal prime minister William Gladstone emancipated crofters from the rule of the landlords. The Act enabled those who had effectively been landowners' serfs to become owner-occupiers of their own small farms. By this time fishermen from Holland, who had traditionally gathered each year off the coast of Shetland to fish for herring, triggered an industry in the islands that boomed from around 1880 until the 1920s when stocks of the fish began to dwindle. The production peaked in 1905 at more than a million barrels, of which 708,000 were exported.

=== 20th century ===
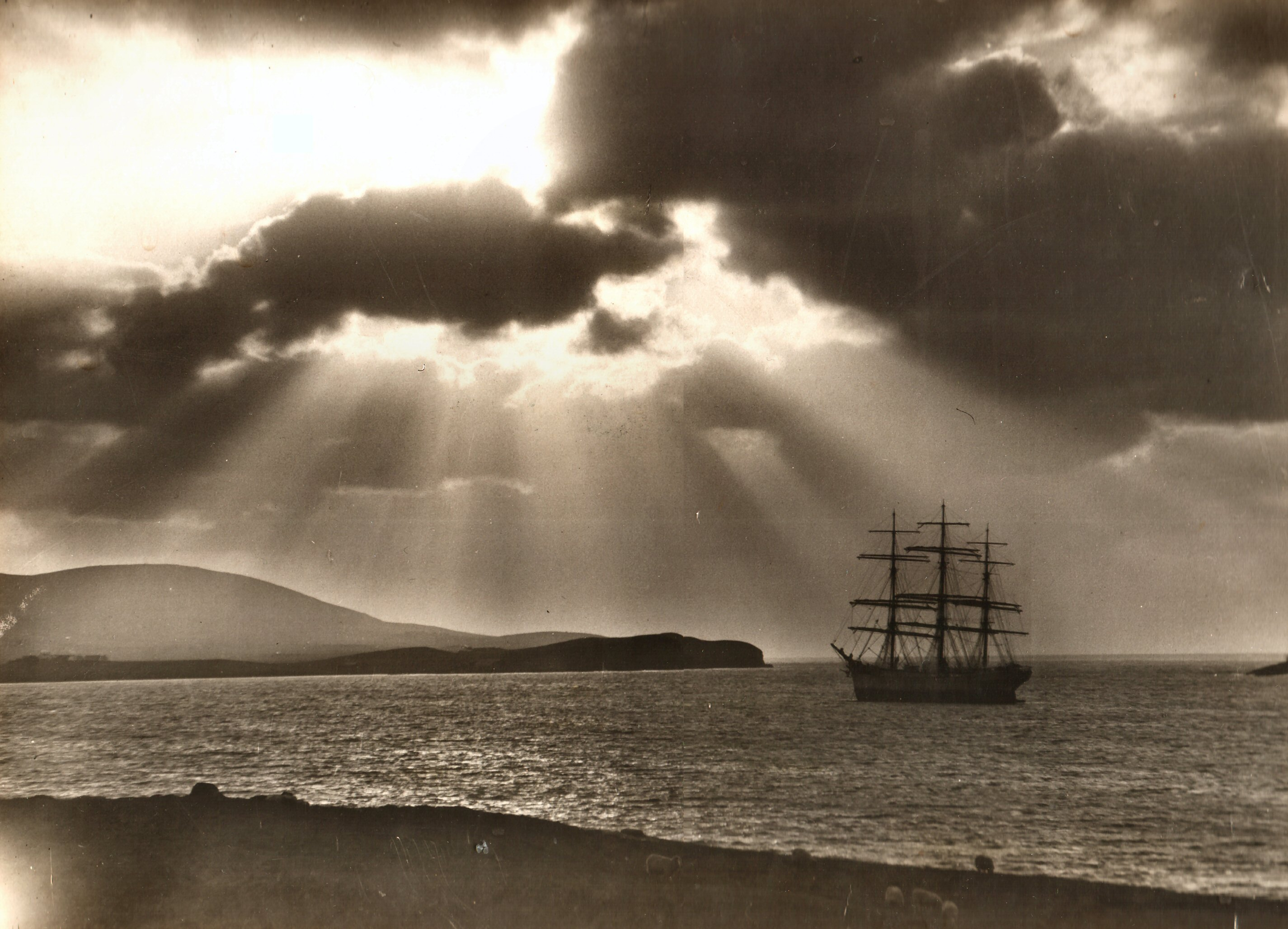
Full-rigged ship Maella, of Oslo, in Bressay Sound, around 1922

During World War I, many Shetlanders served in the Gordon Highlanders, a further 3,000 served in the Merchant Navy, and more than 1,500 in a special local naval reserve. The 10th Cruiser Squadron was stationed at Swarbacks Minn (the stretch of water to the south of Muckle Roe), and during a single year from March 1917 more than 4,500 ships sailed from Lerwick as part of an escorted convoy system. In total, Shetland lost more than 500 men, a higher proportion than any other part of Britain, and there were further waves of emigration in the 1920s and 1930s.

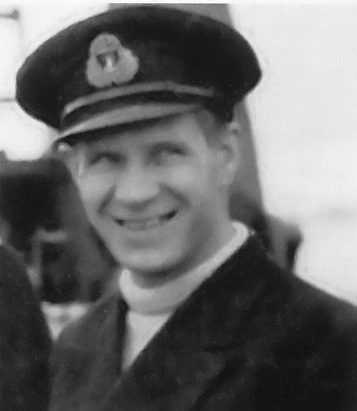
Leif "Shetland" Larsen, Norwegian leader of the Shetland Bus operations in World War II, the most highly decorated allied naval officer of the war

During World War II, a Norwegian naval unit nicknamed the "Shetland bus" was established by the Special Operations Executive in the autumn of 1940 with a base first at Lunna and later in Scalloway to conduct operations around the coast of Norway. About 30 fishing vessels used by Norwegian refugees were gathered and the Shetland Bus conducted covert operations, carrying intelligence agents, refugees, instructors for the resistance, and military supplies. It made over 200 trips across the sea, and Leif Larsen, the most highly decorated allied naval officer of the war, made 52 of them. Several RAF airfields and sites were also established at Sullom Voe and several lighthouses suffered enemy air attacks.

Oil reserves discovered in the later 20th century in the seas both east and west of Shetland have provided a much-needed alternative source of income for the islands. The East Shetland Basin is one of Europe's prolific petroleum provinces. As a result of the oil revenue and the cultural links with Norway, a small Home Rule movement developed briefly to recast the constitutional position of Shetland. It saw as its models the Isle of Man, as well as Shetland's closest neighbour, the Faroe Islands, an autonomous dependency of Denmark.

The population stood at 17,814 in 1961.

== Economy ==
Today, the main revenue producers in Shetland are agriculture, aquaculture, fishing, renewable energy, the petroleum industry (crude oil and natural gas production), the creative industries and tourism. Unst also has a rocket launch site called SaxaVord Spaceport (previously known as Shetland Space Centre). A February 2021 news item indicated that a rocket manufacturer from Germany, HyImpulse Technologies, planned to launch spacecraft powered by hydrogen from the Spaceport, starting in 2023. During the previous month, the Space Centre had filed plans with Council for a "satellite launch facility and associated infrastructure".

As of February 2021, information on the Promote Shetland Web site indicated that "Shetland is less reliant on tourism than many Scottish islands" and that oil was an important sector of the economy. The "process of gradually transitioning from oil to clean renewable energy ... production of clean hydrogen" was also emphasized. Fishing remained the primary sector and was expected to grow.

=== Fishing ===
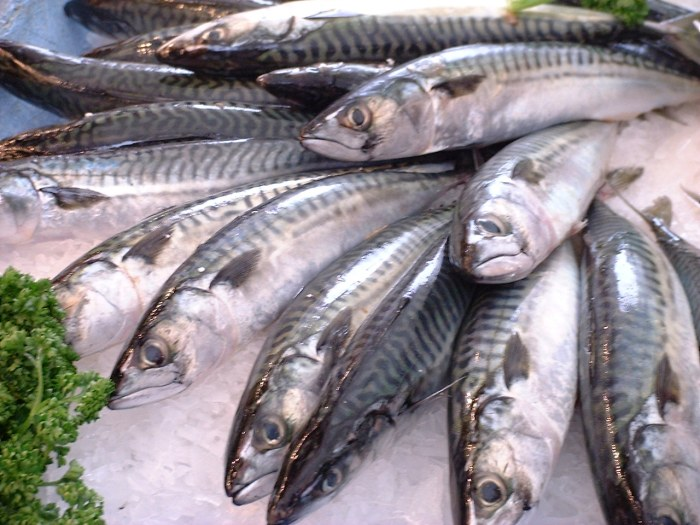
Atlantic Mackerel

Fishing is central to the islands' economy today, with the total catch being 75,767 t (83,519 tons) in 2009, valued at over £73.2 million. Atlantic mackerel makes up more than half of the catch in Shetland by weight and value, and there are significant landings of haddock, cod, herring, whiting, monkfish and shellfish.

A report published in October 2020 was optimistic about the future of this sector in: "With new fish markets in Lerwick and Scalloway, and plans to expand its aquaculture offerings in Yell, Shetland is preparing for more growth in its biggest industry".

As of February 2021, the Promote Shetland website stated that "more fish is landed in Shetland than in England, Wales and Northern Ireland combined', that "Shetland harvests 40,000 tonnes of salmon a year, worth £180 million" and that "6,500 tonnes of mussels are grown in Shetland, more than 80 per cent of the total Scottish production".

=== Energy and fossil fuels ===
Map of Shetland

Oil and gas were first landed in 1978 at Sullom Voe, which has subsequently become one of the largest terminals in Europe. Taxes from the oil have increased public sector spending on social welfare, art, sport, environmental measures and financial development. Three-quarters of the islands' workforce is employed in the service sector, and the Shetland Islands Council alone accounted for 27.9% of output in 2003. Shetland's access to oil revenues has funded the Shetland Charitable Trust, which in turn funds a wide variety of local programmes. The balance of the fund in 2011 was £217 million, i.e., about £9,500 per head. (Note: No other part of the United Kingdom has any such oil-related fund. By comparison, as of 31 December 2010, the total value of the Government Pension Fund of Norway was NOK 3 077 billion (US$525 billion), i.e., circa £68,000 per head.)

In January 2007, the Shetland Islands Council signed a partnership agreement with Scottish and Southern Energy for the Viking Wind Farm, a 200-turbine wind farm and subsea cable. This renewable energy project would produce about 600 megawatts and contribute about £20 million to the Shetland economy per year. The plan met with significant opposition within the islands, primarily resulting from the anticipated visual impact of the development. However, in August 2024 the completion of the first part of the project saw Shetland connected to the mainland National Grid for the first time via a 600 MW HVDC link.

The PURE project in Unst is a research centre which uses a combination of wind power and fuel cells to create a wind-hydrogen system. The project is run by the Unst Partnership, the local community's development trust.

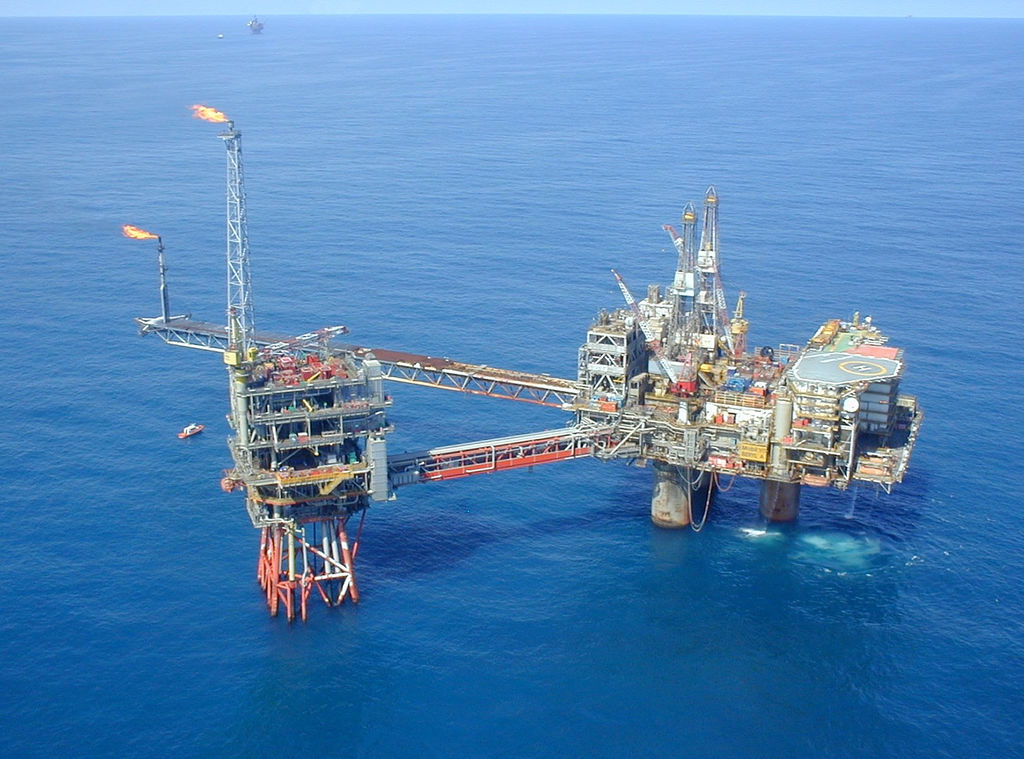
Apache Corporation's Beryl alpha oil platform in the East Shetland Basin

A status report on hydrogen production in Shetland, published in September 2020, stated that Shetland Islands Council (SIC) had "joined a number of organisations and projects to drive forward plans to establish hydrogen as a future energy source for the isles and beyond". For example, it was a member of the Scottish Hydrogen Fuel Cell Association (SHFCA). The ORION project, previously named the Shetland Energy Hub, was underway; the plan was to create an energy hub that would use clean electricity in the development of "new technologies such as blue and green hydrogen generation".

In December 2020 the Scottish government released a hydrogen policy statement with plans for incorporating both blue and green hydrogen for use in heating, transportation and industry. The government also planned an investment of £100 million in the hydrogen sector "for the £180 million Emerging Energy Technologies Fund". Shetland Islands Council planned to obtain further specifics about the availability of funding. The government had already agreed that the production of "green" hydrogen from wind power near Sullom Voe Terminal was a valid plan. A December 2020 report stated that "the extensive terminal could also be used for direct refuelling of hydrogen-powered ships" and suggested that the fourth jetty at Sullom Voe "could be suitable for ammonia export".

=== Farming and textiles ===
Farming is mostly concerned with the raising of Shetland sheep, known for their unusually fine wool. Knitwear is important both to the economy and culture of Shetland, and the Fair Isle design is well known. However, the industry faces challenges due to plagiarism of the word "Shetland" by manufacturers operating elsewhere; a certification trademark, "The Shetland Lady", has been registered.

Crofting, the farming of small plots of land on a legally restricted tenancy basis, is still practised and is viewed as a key Shetland tradition as well as an important source of income. Crops raised include oats and barley; however, the cold, windswept islands make for a harsh environment for most plants.

=== Media ===
Television signals in Shetland are received from the Bressay TV transmitter. Shetland is served by a weekly local newspaper, The Shetland Times and the online Shetland News with radio service being provided by BBC Radio Shetland and the commercial radio station SIBC.

=== Tourism ===
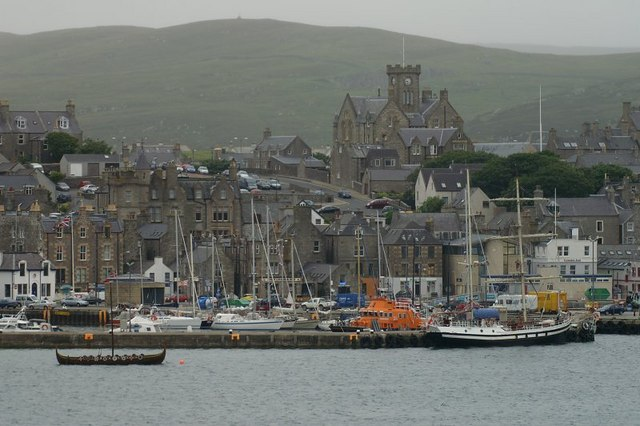
Victoria pier, Lerwick. The replica Viking longboat Dim Riv is bottom left and the town hall is on the hill. Taken from the Aberdeen ferry in Bressay Sound.

Shetland is a popular destination for cruise ships, and in 2010 the Lonely Planet guide named Shetland as the sixth best region in the world for tourists seeking unspoilt destinations. The islands were described as "beautiful and rewarding" and the Shetlanders as "a fiercely independent and self-reliant bunch". Overall visitor expenditure was £16.4 million in 2006, in which year just under 26,000 cruise liner passengers arrived at Lerwick Harbour. This business has grown substantially with 109 cruise ships booked in for 2019, representing over 107,000 passenger visits. In 2009, the most popular visitor attractions were the Shetland Museum, the RSPB reserve at Sumburgh Head, Bonhoga Gallery at Weisdale Mill and Jarlshof. Geopark Shetland (now Shetland UNESCO Global Geopark) was established by the Amenity Trust in 2009 to boost sustainable tourism to the islands.

According to the Promote Shetland organisation's website, tourism increased "by £12.6 million between 2017 and 2019 with more than half of visitors giving their trip a perfect rating".

An October 2018 report stated that 91,000 passengers from cruise ships arrived that year (a record high), an increase over the 70,000 in 2017. There was a drop in 2019 to "over 76,000 cruise ship passengers".

==== Effect of the COVID-19 pandemic ====
Tourism dropped significantly in 2020 (and into 2021) due to restrictions necessitated by the COVID-19 pandemic and the major decline in the number of cruise ships that continued to operate worldwide.

As of early February 2021, the Promote Shetland website was still stating this information: "At present, nobody should travel to Shetland from a Level 3 or Level 4 local authority area in Scotland, unless it's for essential purposes". That page reiterated the government recommendation "that people avoid any unnecessary travel between Scotland and England, Wales, or Northern Ireland".

A September 2020 report stated that "The Highlands and Islands region has been disproportionately impacted by the COVID-19 pandemic to date, when compared to Scotland and the UK as a whole". The tourism industry required short-term support for "business survival and recovery" and that was expected to continue as the sector was "severely impacted for as long as physical distancing and travel restrictions" remained in place. As of 31 December 2020, the usage of ferries and buses was restricted to those travelling for essential purposes. The Island Equivalent scheme was introduced in early 2021 by the Scottish government to financially assist hospitality and retail businesses "affected by Level 3 coronavirus restrictions". Previous schemes in 2020 included the Strategic Framework Business Fund and the Coronavirus Business Support Fund.

=== Transport ===
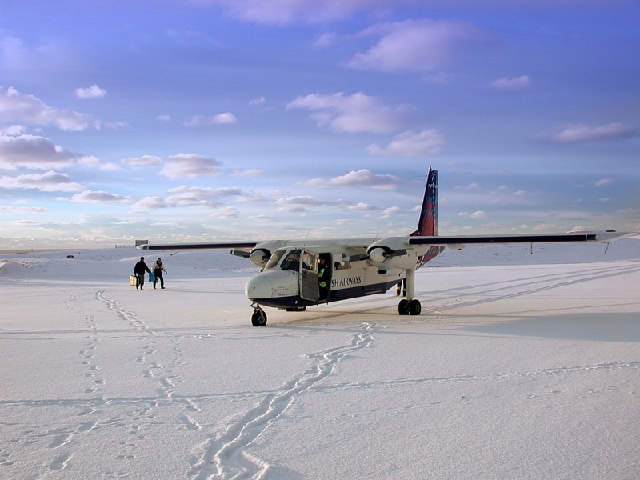
Loganair aircraft in Fair Isle, midway between Orkney and Shetland

Transport between islands is primarily by ferry, and Shetland Islands Council operates various inter-island services. Shetland is also served by a domestic connection from Lerwick to Aberdeen on mainland Scotland. This service, which takes about 12 hours, is operated by NorthLink Ferries. Some services also call at Kirkwall, Orkney, which increases the journey time between Aberdeen and Lerwick by 2 hours.

Sumburgh Airport, the main airport in Shetland, is located close to Sumburgh Head, 40 km (25 mi) south of Lerwick. Loganair operates flights to other parts of Scotland up to ten times a day, the destinations being Kirkwall, Aberdeen, Inverness, Glasgow and Edinburgh. Lerwick/Tingwall Airport is located 11 km (6.8 mi) west of Lerwick. Operated by Directflight in partnership with Shetland Islands Council, it is devoted to inter-island flights from the Shetland Mainland to Fair Isle and Foula.

Public bus services are operated in Mainland, Trondra, Burra, Unst and Yell, with scheduled dial-a-ride services available in Bressay and Fetlar. Buses also connect with ferries leading to Foula, Papa Stour, and Whalsay.

Given that the archipelago is exposed to wind and tide, there are numerous sites of wrecked ships. Lighthouses are sited as an aid to navigation at various locations.

In June 2026, Shetland council backed plans to build tunnels from Shetland's mainland to Yell and from Yell to Unst, to be followed by additional tunnels to Whalsay and Bressay. According to a feasibility study, these tunnels could be operational within 8 years at an estimated cost of £1.5bn, and in the long term would be cheaper than building new ferries and replacing harbours.

== Governance ==
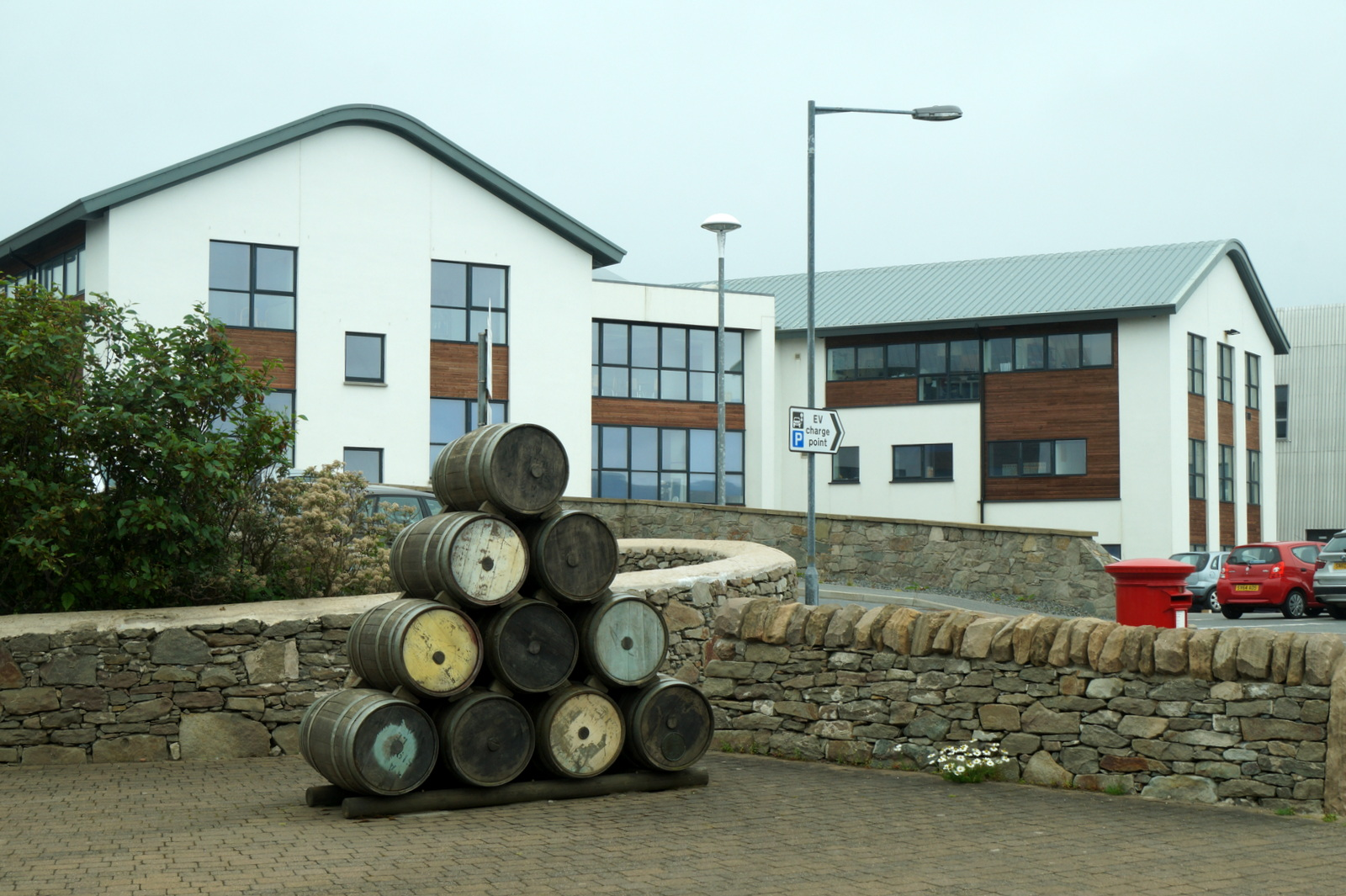
8 North Ness, Lerwick: Headquarters of Shetland Islands Council

The local authority is the Shetland Islands Council, based in Lerwick. It meets at the former St Ringan's Church and has its main offices at 8 North Ness, overlooking the harbour.

=== Administrative history ===
On its absorption into Scotland in 1472, the landholdings and jurisdictions of the old lordship of Shetland passed to the Scottish crown. The separate earldom of Orkney was absorbed into Scotland at the same time. More typically Scottish forms of administration were gradually introduced to the Northern Isles. The position of Sheriff of Orkney and Shetland was created in 1541. Shetland and Orkney retained their own legal systems until 1612, when the general laws of Scotland were applied.

Commissioners of Supply were established in 1667 for each shire across Scotland. Unusually, despite being one shire, Shetland and Orkney were given separate bodies of commissioners. More local government functions were gradually given to the commissioners over time. At a court case in 1829, the Court of Session declined to rule on whether Shetland and Orkney were one county or two. They operated as one county for the purposes of the administration of justice, lieutenancy, and parliamentary constituencies, but operated as two counties for local government functions.

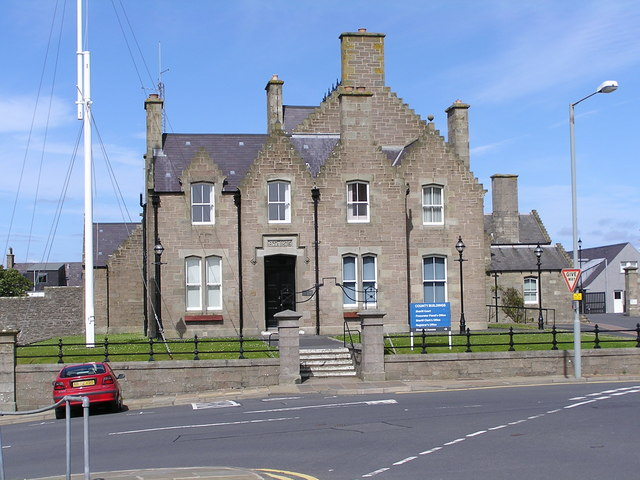
County Buildings, Lerwick, completed 1875: Shetland's main courthouse, also served as headquarters of Zetland County Council 1890–1975

Elected county councils were created in 1890 under the Local Government (Scotland) Act 1889, taking most of the functions of the commissioners (which were eventually abolished in 1930). The 1889 Act also directed that Shetland and Orkney were to be separate counties (with the act using the then-prevalent spelling of 'Zetland' for Shetland). Zetland County Council held its first meeting on 22 May 1890 at the County Buildings, Lerwick, which had been built in 1875 and served as Shetland's main courthouse and also served as the meeting place for the commissioners of supply.

Local government was reformed in 1975 under the Local Government (Scotland) Act 1973, which replaced Scotland's counties, burghs and landward districts. In most of Scotland a two-tier structure of upper-tier regions and lower-tier districts was used, but a single-tier structure of island areas was used for Shetland, Orkney and the Western Isles. Further local government reform in 1996 introduced single-tier council areas across all of Scotland. The councils of the three island areas created in 1975 continued to provide the same services after 1996, but their areas were re-designated as council areas.

== Parishes and communities ==
Parishes existed from medieval times. From 1845 to 1894 they had parish boards and from 1894 to 1930 they had parish councils. They have had no administrative functions since 1930, but continue to be used for the presentation of statistics.

Shetland's civil parishes are:

Civil Parish	Included areas	Area (km^{2})	Population (2011 Census)	Density
Bressay		27.8	368	13.2
Delting	Brae, Muckle Roe	131.7	1,917	14.6
Dunrossness	Cunningsburgh, Fair Isle, Sandwick	120.5	3,216	26.7
Fetlar		41.4	61	1.5
Lerwick	Gulberwick, Quarff, Burra	32.2	8,607	267.3
Nesting	Skerries, Whalsay	105.6	1,759	16.7
Northmavine		204.1	741	3.6
Sandsting		162.4	831	5.1
Tingwall	Scalloway, Trondra	118.9	3,091	26.0
Unst		122.2	632	5.2
Walls and Sandness	Foula, Papa Stour, Vaila	78.6	978	12.4
Yell		211.7	966	4.6
Shetland		1,357.1	23,167	17.1

=== Community councils ===
Community councils were created in 1975 as part of the wider reforms that year. They have no statutory powers, but serve as a representative body for their communities. Shetland Islands Council designates community council areas, but a community council is only formed if there is sufficient interest from the residents. Shetland comprises the following communities, all of which have community councils operating as at 2024:

- Bressay
- Burra and Trondra
- Delting
- Dunrossness
- Fetlar
- Gulberwick, Quarff and Cunningsburgh
- Lerwick
- Nesting and Lunnasting
- Northmavine
- Sandness and Walls
- Sandsting and Aithsting
- Sandwick
- Scalloway
- Skerries
- Tingwall, Whiteness and Weisdale
- Unst
- Whalsay
- Yell

== Education ==
As of early 2021, Shetland had 22 primary schools, five junior high schools, and two high schools: Anderson High School and Brae High School. Shetland College UHI is a partner of the University of the Highlands and Islands (UHI). UHI's Centre for Rural Creativity partners with Shetland Arts Development Agency to provide courses on film, music and media up to Masters level at Mareel. The North Atlantic Fisheries College (NAFC) also operates in partnership with UHI offering "a range of training courses relevant to the maritime industries".

== Sport ==
The Shetland Football Association oversees two divisions – a Premier League and a Reserve League – which are affiliated with the Scottish Amateur Football Association.

== Churches and religion ==
Religion in Shetland (2011):
1. Non-religious (45.4%)
2. Church of Scotland (29.9%)
3. Catholic Church (4.10%)
4. Other Christian (10.6%)
5. Islam (0.40%)
6. Other religions (1.10%)
7. Not stated (8.50%)

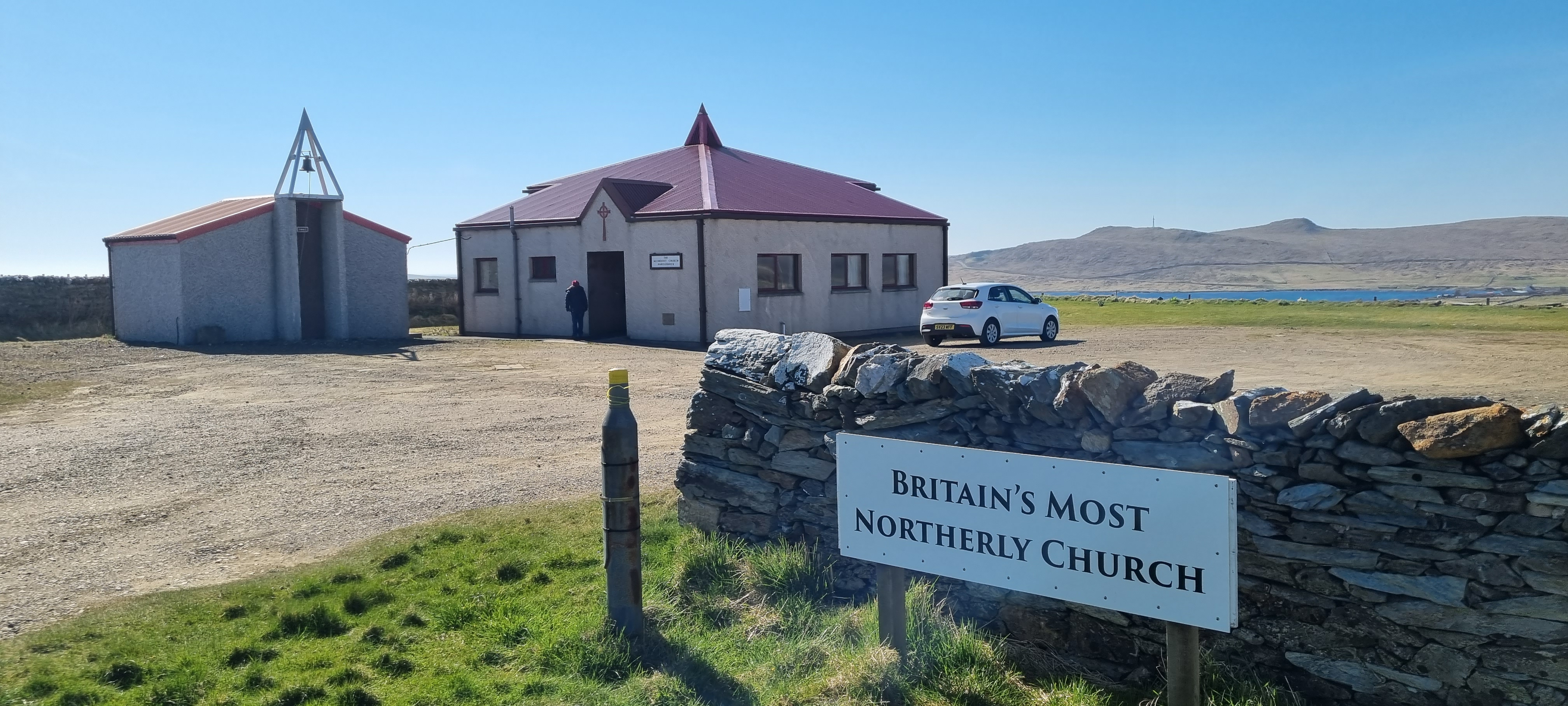
Haroldswick Church, the most northerly church building in the United Kingdom

The Reformation reached the archipelago in 1560. This was an apparently peaceful transition and there is little evidence of religious intolerance in Shetland's recorded history. In the 2011 census, Shetland registered a higher proportion of people with no religion than the Scottish average. Nevertheless, the Methodist Church has a relatively high membership in Shetland, which is a District of the Methodist Church (with the rest of Scotland comprising a separate District). The Church of Scotland had a Presbytery of Shetland that includes St. Columba's Church in Lerwick.

On 1 June 2020 the Presbytery of Shetland merged with the Presbytery of Aberdeen becoming the Presbytery of Aberdeen and Shetland. All 13 parishes in Shetland have been merged into one.

== Politics ==
Shetland is represented in the House of Commons as part of the Orkney and Shetland constituency, which elects one Member of Parliament (MP). As of May 2023, and since 2001, the MP is Alistair Carmichael, a Liberal Democrat. This seat has been held by the Liberal Democrats or their predecessors the Liberal Party since 1950, longer than any other seat in the United Kingdom.

In the Scottish Parliament the Shetland Islands constituency elects one Member of the Scottish Parliament (MSP) by the first past the post system. Tavish Scott of the Scottish Liberal Democrats had held the seat since the creation of the Scottish Parliament in 1999. Beatrice Wishart MSP, also of the Scottish Liberal Democrats, was elected to replace Tavish Scott in August 2019. Shetland is within the Highlands and Islands electoral region. A shock SNP gain for Hannah Mary Goodlad in the 2026 Scottish Parliament election marked the first time since the 1950s that a party other than the Liberal Democrats, or their predecessors the Liberal Party won Shetland.

The political composition of the Shetland Islands Council is 21 Independents and 1 Scottish National Party.

In the 2014 Scottish independence referendum, Shetland had the fourth highest 'No' vote of 63.7%. Orkney had the highest 'No' vote of 67.2%, second and third highest were Scottish Borders (66.6%) and Dumfries and Galloway (65.7%).

The Wir Shetland movement was set up in 2015 to campaign for greater autonomy. In September 2020, the Shetland Islands Council voted 18–2 to explore replacing the council with a new system of government, which controls a fairer share of the islands' revenue streams and has a greater influence over their own affairs, which could include very lucrative oil fields and fishing waters.

In the 2016 United Kingdom European Union membership referendum 56.5% voted Remain.

In 2022, as part of the Levelling Up White Paper, an "Island Forum" was proposed, which would allow local policymakers and residents in Shetland to work alongside their counterparts in Orkney, the Western Isles, Anglesey and the Isle of Wight on common issues, such as broadband connectivity, and provide a platform for them to communicate directly with the government on the challenges island communities face in terms of levelling up.

== Local culture and the arts ==
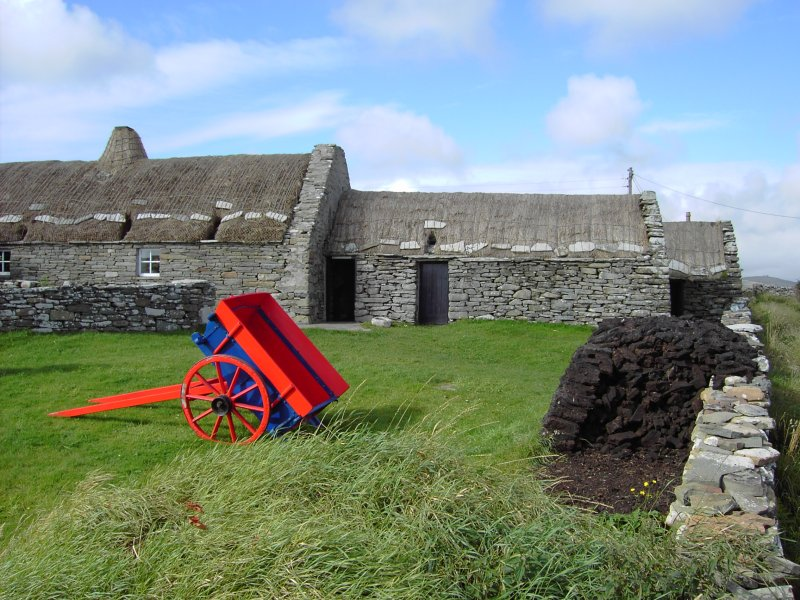
The Shetland Crofthouse museum

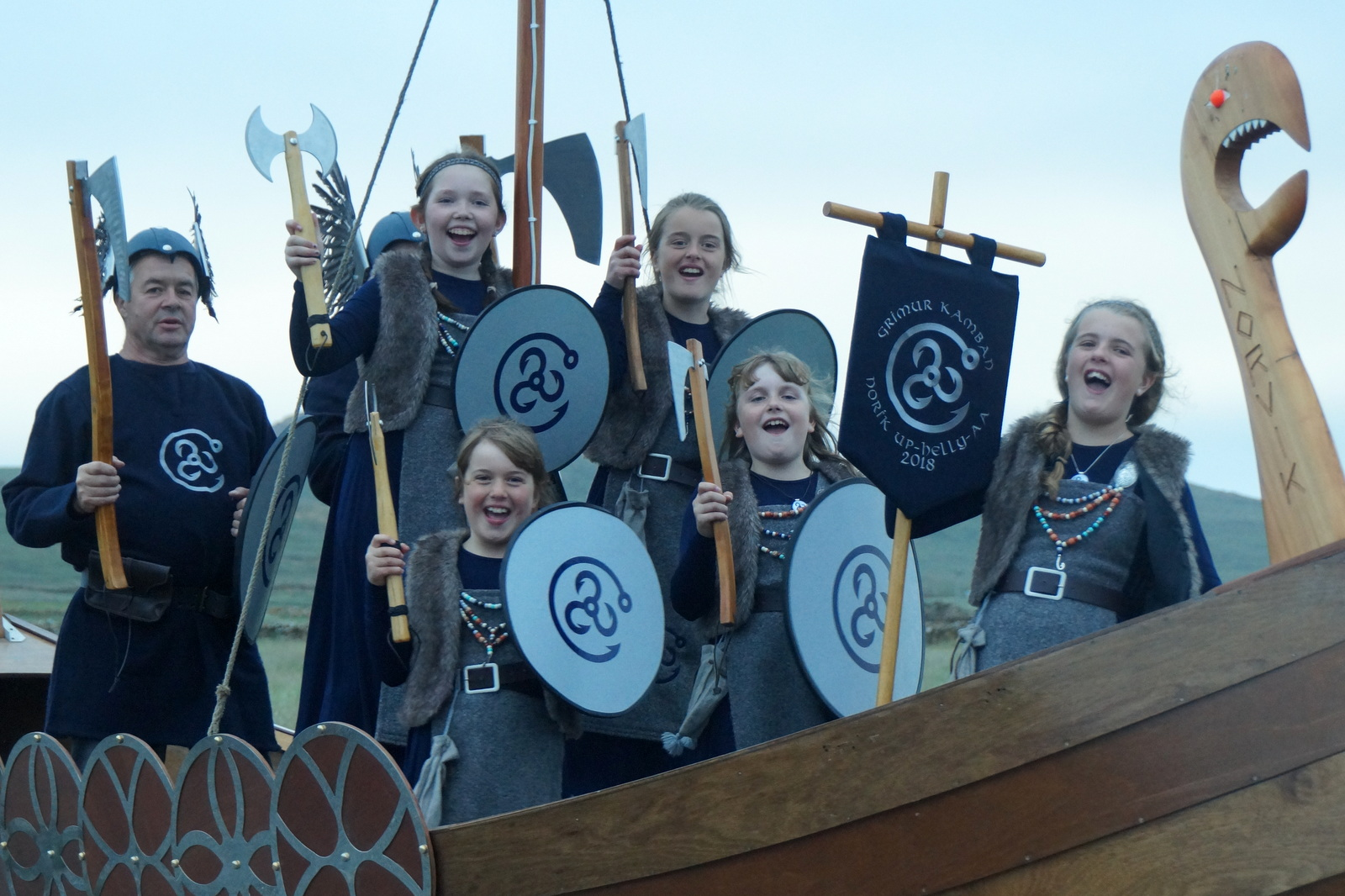
The Up Helly Aa

After the islands were officially transferred from Norway to Scotland in 1472, several Scots families from the Scottish Lowlands emigrated to Shetland in the 16th and 17th centuries. Studies of the genetic makeup of the islands' population, however, indicate that Shetlanders are just under half Scandinavian in origin, and sizeable amounts of Scandinavian ancestry, both patrilineal and matrilineal, have been reported in Orkney (55%) and Shetland (68%). This combination is reflected in many aspects of local life. For example, almost every place name in use can be traced back to the Vikings.

The Lerwick Up Helly Aa is one of several fire festivals held in Shetland annually in the middle of winter, starting on the last Tuesday of January. The festival is just over 100 years old in its present, highly organised form. Originally held to break up the long nights of winter and mark the end of Yule, the festival has become one celebrating the isles' heritage and includes a procession of men dressed as Vikings and the burning of a replica longship.

Shetland also competes in the biennial International Island Games, which it hosted in 2005.

The cuisine of Shetland is based on locally produced lamb, beef and seafood, some of it organic. The real ale-producing Valhalla Brewery is the most northerly in Britain. The Shetland Black is a variety of blue potato with a dark skin and indigo-coloured flesh markings.

=== Language ===
The Norn language was a form of Old Norse spoken in the Northern Isles, and continued to be spoken until the 18th century. It was gradually replaced in Shetland by an insular dialect of Scots, known as Shetlandic, which is in turn being replaced by Scottish English. Although Norn was spoken for hundreds of years, it is now extinct and few written sources remain, although influences remain in the Insular Scots dialects. The Shetland dialect is used in local radio and dialect writing, and is kept alive by organisations such as Shetland Forwirds, and the Shetland Folk Society.

The 2022 Scottish Census reported that out of 22,406 residents aged three and over, 9,179 (41%) considered themselves able to speak or read the Scots language.

The 2022 Scottish Census reported that out of 22,403 residents aged three and over, 137 (0.6%) considered themselves able to speak or read Gaelic.

=== Music ===
Shetland's culture and landscapes have inspired a variety of musicians, writers and film-makers. The Forty Fiddlers was formed in the 1950s to promote the traditional fiddle style, which is a vibrant part of local culture today. Notable exponents of Shetland folk music include Aly Bain, Jenna Reid, Fiddlers' Bid, and the late Tom Anderson and Peerie Willie Johnson. Thomas Fraser was a country musician who never released a commercial recording during his life, but whose work has become popular more than 20 years after his death in 1978.

The annual Shetland Folk Festival began in 1981 and is hosted on the first weekend of May.

=== Writers ===
Walter Scott's 1822 novel The Pirate is set in "a remote part of Shetland", and was inspired by his 1814 visit to the islands. The name Jarlshof meaning "Earl's Mansion" is a coinage of his. Robert Cowie, a doctor born in Lerwick published the 1874 work entitled Shetland: Descriptive and Historical; Being a Graduation Thesis on the Inhabitants of the Shetland Islands; and a Topographical Description of the Country. Menzies. 1874.

Hugh MacDiarmid, the Scots poet and writer, lived in Whalsay from the mid-1930s through 1942, and wrote many poems there, including a number that directly address or reflect the Shetland environment, such as "On A Raised Beach", which was inspired by a visit to West Linga. The 1975 novel North Star by Hammond Innes is largely set in Shetland and Raman Mundair's 2007 book of poetry A Choreographer's Cartography offers a British Asian perspective on the landscape. The Shetland Quartet by Ann Cleeves, who previously lived in Fair Isle, is a series of crime novels set around the islands. In 2013, her novel Red Bones became the basis of BBC crime drama television series Shetland.

Vagaland, who grew up in Walls, was arguably Shetland's finest poet of the 20th century. Haldane Burgess was a Shetland historian, poet, novelist, violinist, linguist and socialist, and Rhoda Bulter (1929–1994) is one of the best-known Shetland poets of recent times. Other 20th- and 21st-century poets and novelists include Christine De Luca, Robert Alan Jamieson who grew up in Sandness, the late Lollie Graham of Veensgarth, Stella Sutherland of Bressay, the late William J. Tait from Yell, Laureen Johnson, and Roseanne Watt.

There is one monthly magazine in production: Shetland. The quarterly The New Shetlander, founded in 1947, is said to be Scotland's longest-running literary magazine. For much of the later 20th century, it was the major vehicle for the work of local writers – and of others, including early work by George Mackay Brown.

=== Films and television ===
Michael Powell made The Edge of the World in 1937, a dramatisation based on the true story of the evacuation of the last 36 inhabitants of the remote island of St Kilda in 1930. Other films on or about Shetland include A Crofter's Life in Shetland (1932), A Shetland Lyric (1934), and It's Nice Up North (2006), a comedy documentary by Graham Fellows. The Screenplay film festival takes place annually in Mareel, a cinema, music and education venue.

The BBC One television series Shetland, a crime drama, is set in the islands and is based on the book series by Ann Cleeves. The programme is filmed partly in Shetland and partly on the Scottish mainland.

== Natural heritage ==
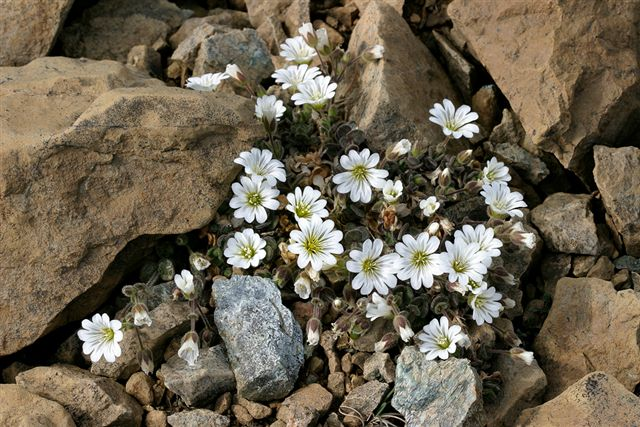
Shetland mouse-ear (Cerastium nigrescens), on the Keen of Hamar reserve, Unst

Shetland has three national nature reserves, at the seabird colonies of Hermaness and Noss, and at Keen of Hamar to preserve the serpentine flora. There are a further 81 SSSIs, which cover 66% or more of the land surfaces of Fair Isle, Papa Stour, Fetlar, Noss, and Foula. Mainland has 45 separate sites.

=== Flora ===
Before 3000 BC, Shetland was covered by extensive open woodland. Over the centuries, livestock farming combined with harsh climatic conditions led to the progressive loss of trees, leaving only isolated woodland remnants. Native trees such as rowan and crab apple are now only found in a few isolated places such as cliffs and loch islands.

The total number of plant species is about 400, the flora of the archipelago being dominated by Arctic-alpine plants, wild flowers, moss and lichen. Spring squill, buck's-horn plantain, Scots lovage, roseroot and sea campion are abundant, especially in sheltered places. Shetland mouse-ear (Cerastium nigrescens) is an endemic flowering plant found only in Shetland. It was first recorded in 1837 by botanist Thomas Edmondston. Although reported from two other sites in the nineteenth century, it currently grows only on two serpentine hills in the island of Unst. The nationally scarce oysterplant is found in several islands and the British Red Listed bryophyte Thamnobryum alopecurum has also been recorded. Listed marine algae include: Polysiphonia fibrillosa (Dillwyn) Sprengel and Polysiphonia atlantica Kapraun and J.Norris, Polysiphonia brodiaei (Dillwyn) Sprengel, Polysiphonia elongata (Hudson) Sprengel, Polysiphonia elongella, Harvey. The Shetland Monkeyflower is unique to Shetland and is a mutation of the Monkeyflower (mimulus guttatus) introduced to Shetland in the 19th century.

=== Fauna ===
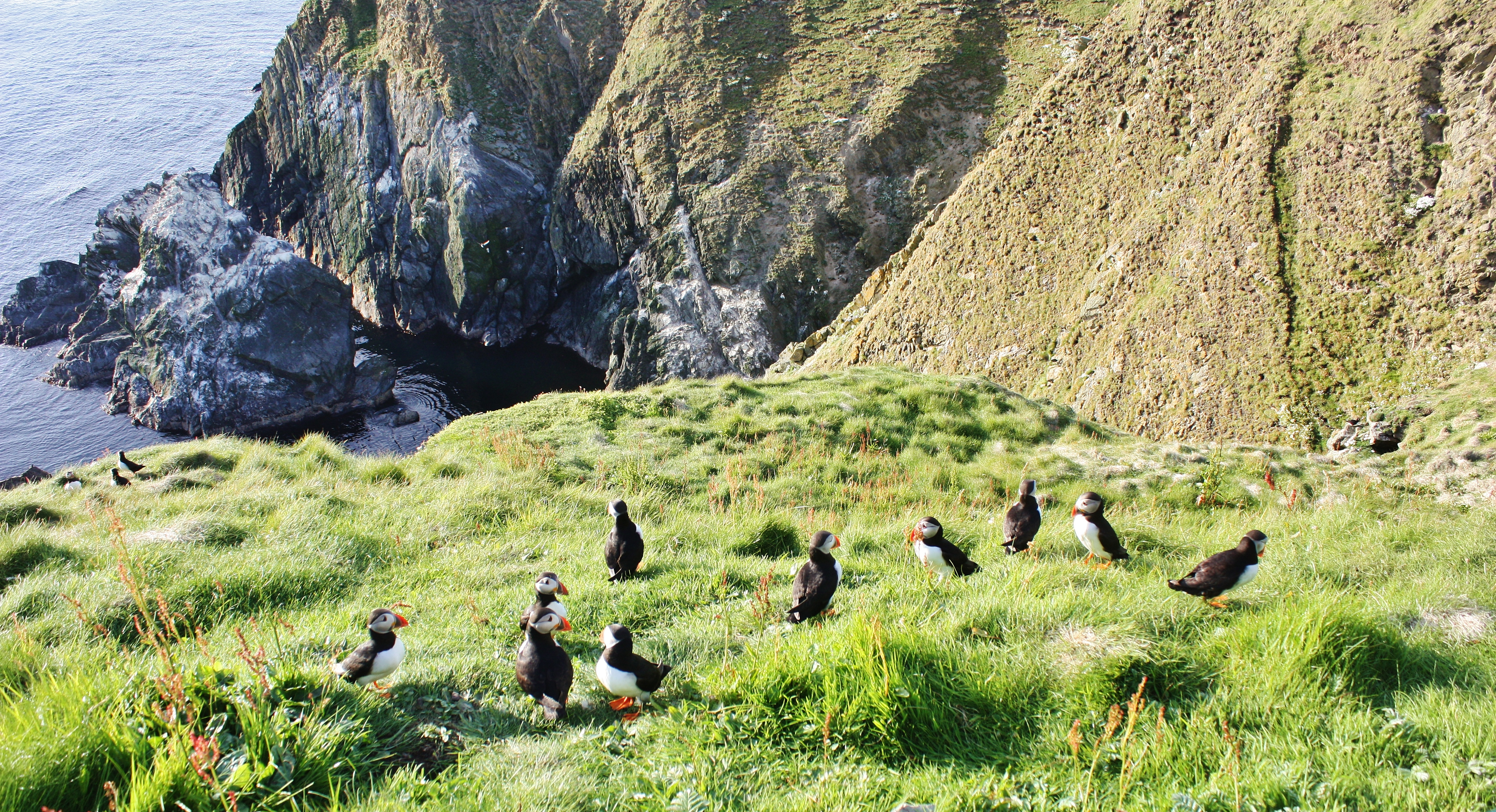
Atlantic puffin in the Shetland Islands

Shetland has numerous seabird colonies. Birds found in the islands include Atlantic puffin, storm-petrel, red-throated diver, northern gannet and great skua (locally called "bonxie"). Numerous rarities have also been recorded including black-browed albatross and snow goose. A single pair of snowy owls bred in Fetlar from 1967 to 1975. The Shetland wren, Fair Isle wren, and Shetland starling are subspecies endemic to Shetland. There are populations of various birds such as curlew, lapwing, snipe and golden plover.

An early ornithologist who wrote about the wealth of birdlife in Shetland was Edmund Selous (1857–1934) in his book The Bird Watcher in the Shetlands (1905).

The geographical isolation and recent glacial history of Shetland have resulted in a depleted mammalian fauna and the brown rat and house mouse are two of only three species of rodent present in the islands. The Shetland field mouse is the third and the archipelago's fourth endemic subspecies, of which there are three varieties in Yell, Foula, and Fair Isle. They are variants of Apodemus sylvaticus and archaeological evidence suggests that this species was present during the Middle Iron Age (around 200 BC to 400 CE). It is possible that Apodemus was introduced from Orkney where a population has existed since at the least the Bronze Age.

=== Domesticated animals ===
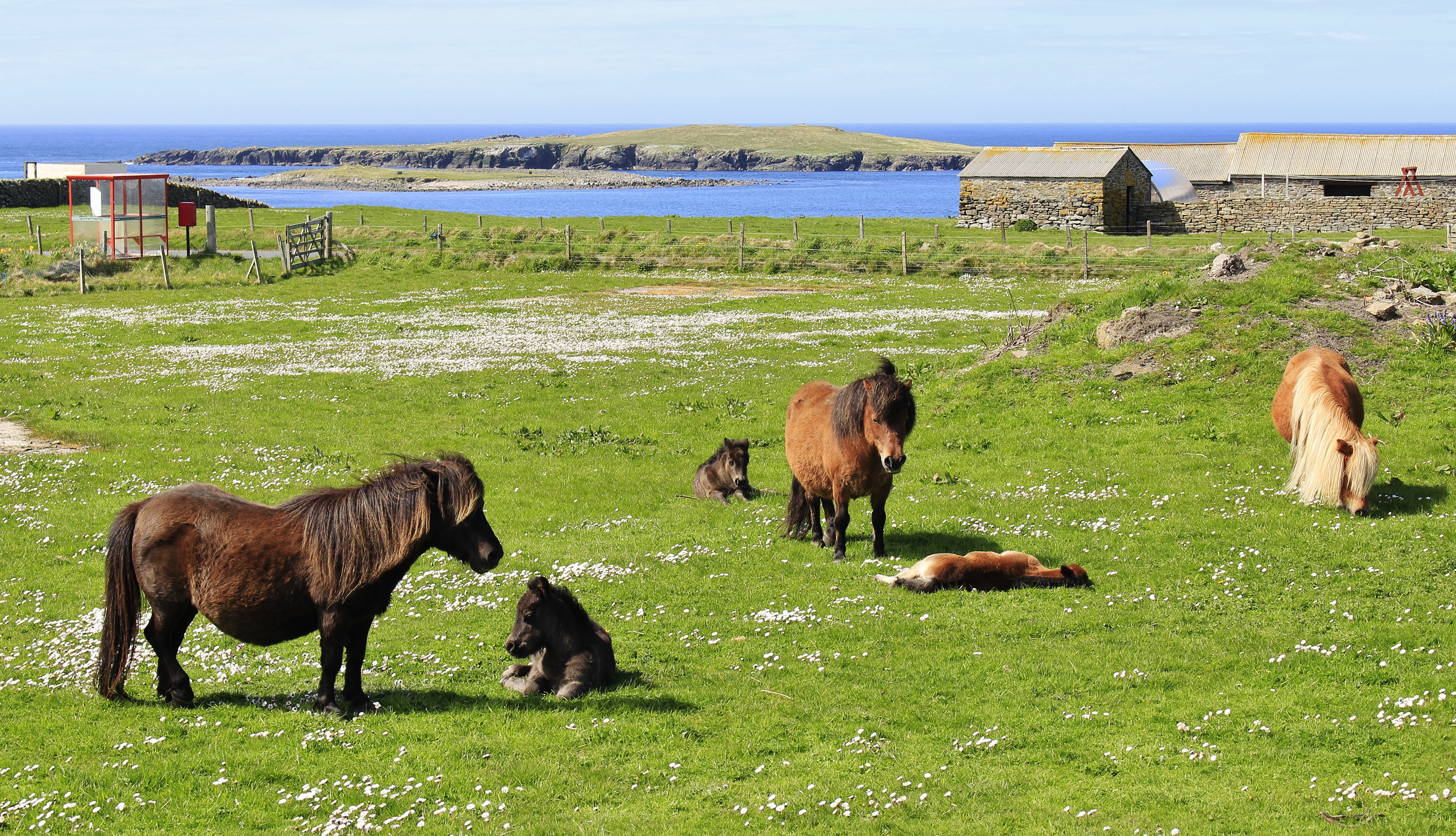
Shetland ponies

There is a variety of indigenous breeds, of which the diminutive Shetland pony is probably the best known, as well as being an important part of the Shetland farming tradition. The first written record of the pony was in 1603 in the Court Books of Shetland and, for its size, it is the strongest of all the horse breeds. Others are the Shetland Sheepdog or "Sheltie", the endangered Shetland cattle and Shetland goose and the Shetland sheep which is believed to have originated prior to 1000 AD. The Grice was a breed of semi-domesticated pig that had a habit of attacking lambs. It became extinct sometime between the middle of the nineteenth century and the 1930s.

== See also ==
=== Lists ===
- List of counties of the United Kingdom
- List of islands in Scotland
- List of populated places in Shetland

=== About Shetland ===
- Mavis Grind
- Udal law

=== Others ===
- Hjeltefjorden
- Battle of Florvåg
- Rögnvald Kali Kolsson
- Timeline of prehistoric Scotland
- Prehistoric Scotland
- Constitutional status of Orkney, Shetland and the Western Isles
