= SIC Ferries =

Scottish ferry company

Shetland Islands Council Ferries
- Type: Public (Council-owned)
- Industry: Transport
- Founded: 1972
- Headquarters: Sella Ness, Sullom Voe, Shetland
- Number of locations: 17 ports
- Area served: Inter-island Shetland
- Services: Ferries
- Owner: Shetland Islands Council
- Website: www.shetland.gov.uk/ferries
- Footnotes; Previously Zetland County Council Ferries (~1972 - 1975)

Shetland Islands Council Ferries (often named SIC Ferries) is a company operating inter-island ferry services in Shetland, a subarctic archipelago off the northeast coast of Scotland. The company operates 8 services across 9 of the Shetland islands using 12 vessels, one of which is operated by BK Marine.

== Services ==
Services of the SIC Ferries are:

- Bluemull service linking the North Isles at Gutcher, Yell; Belmont, Unst; and Hamars Ness, Fetlar. This is done in a triangular service, where one ferry mostly operates between Belmont and Gutcher, with a few trips to Fetlar, and other is based in Fetlar and makes a few daytime trips between Gutcher and Belmont. The Fetlar terminal was changed from Oddsta to Hamars Ness at the end of 2004 after damage to the pier.
- Bressay service to Maryfield on the Isle of Bressay from Lerwick on the Mainland.
- Fair Isle service to Fair Isle from Grutness or Lerwick on the Mainland.
- Foula service to the Isle of Foula from Walls on the Mainland. This service is operated by BK Marine, a Shetland-based workboat hire company.
- Out Skerries service to the Isle of Out Skerries from Symbister (on Whalsay), Vidlin or Lerwick or sometimes Laxo, depending on the timetable and weather conditions, all on the Mainland.
- Papa Stour service to the Isle of Papa Stour from West Burrafirth on the Mainland.
- Whalsay service to Symbister on the Isle of Whalsay from Laxo, or Vidlin depending on weather conditions, on the Mainland.
- Yell service to Ulsta on the southern point of the North Isle of Yell from Toft on the Mainland.

== History ==
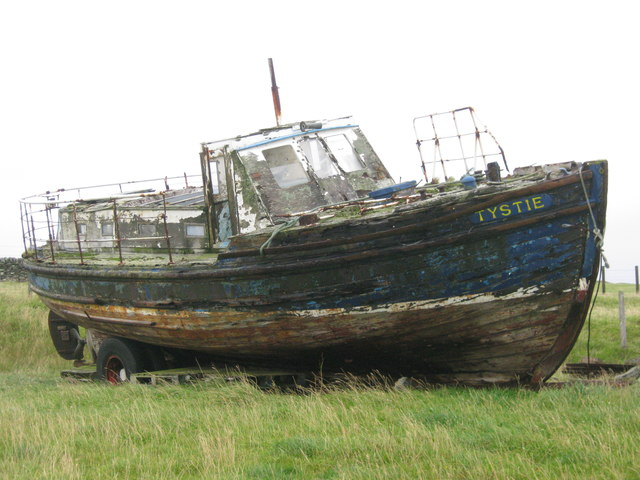
Former Yell, Unst and Bressay Flit boat, MV Tystie, laying derelict

Before RoRo ferries were brought to Shetland, people and cargo were transported to the islands in two different ways, by steamer from Lerwick and the overland route with flit boats across each of the sounds. Shetlanders also used their private fishing boats and private charter boats to get around the islands.

=== Steamer Service ===
The Shetland Steam Navigation Company was formed in 1868 to provide a service from Lerwick to Unst. The SS Chieftain's Bride was bought from the west coast for £2,100. This vessel proved to be too slow, nicknamed "the Crab", for the service, therefore a purpose built SS Earl of Zetland (I) was brought into service in 1877. She continued until 1946 with the new MV Earl of Zetland (II) coming into service in 1939. The new Earl provided 3 sailings per week to Whalsay, Yell and Unst, and once a week to Fetlar and Skerries. By the 1970's, she did 3 trips to Fetlar stopping at Brough with one stop every fortnight at Houbie.

=== Flit Boats Service ===
The flit boats across the sounds were mostly operated by locals and served Bressay; Ulsta, Yell from Mossbank until 1951, then Toft; Unst from Gutcher. The Bressay service was taken over by the Lerwick Harbour Trust in 1973 from local Bressay men. A list of known flit boats are below with mostly rough dates of service:

Vessel Name	Bressay Service	Yell Sound Service	Bluemull Service	Extra Information
MV Osprey			1930's - 1973	Relief
MV Donmile		c1935		
MV Viking		1930's - 1973		Built in Baltasound c1920's - 1930's
MV Tirrick / Norseman		1930's - 1973	1930's - 1973	
MV Puffin		1930's - 1973		Relief
MV Tystie	1973 - 12/10/1975	1930's - c1953	c1957 - 19/11/1973	Last vessel on Bluemull Sound and Bressay before RoRos
MV Shalder		c1966 - 16/5/1973		Last vessel on Yell Sound before RoRos
MV Thelma	1920's - 1933?			
MV Norna	1920's - 1960's			Old lifeboat from RMS Oceanic, which ran aground near Foula
MV Brenda	1933 - 1973			Old pinnacle from SMS Hindenburg, which was scuttled in Scapa Flow
MV Viking Queen	1965 - 1973			
MV Budding Rose	1973			First vessel bought by Lerwick Harbour Trust

=== Norwegian Ferry Trials ===
In 1965, with the growing traffic to the isles, Shetland Islands Council trialed a Norwegian ferry, MV Rovdehorn, to see how practical it would be to introduce roll on/ roll off ferries would be in Shetland. The Norwegian Government gifted the charter of the ferry for the duration of the trials. Due to the weather conditions across the North Sea, Norwegian submarine depot ship HNoMS Horten escorted MV Rovdehorn to Lerwick. Trials commenced on 23 August 1965, with stops at Symbister and Mid Yell and a makeshift wooden linkspan being built in Lerwick to test the loading of the vessel. A video of the news at the time can be viewed at the National Library of Scotland website. After this a large pier and linkspan building program begun alongside the building of 5 new ferries, most of which built in the Faroe Islands.

== Current fleet ==
The SIC Ferries fleet of 12 ferries consists of:

Image	Vessel Name	Cars	Passengers	Service	Launched	Shipbuilders
	MV Hendra	13	95	Whalsay (1982 - 2002, 2005 - ) Yell Sound (2002 - 2004); Bluemull (2004 - 2005)	1982	McTay Marine, Bromborough, Merseyside
	MV Snolda, ex Filla (I)	6	12	Out Skerries (1983 - 2003); Papa Stour (2004 - )	1983	Simek AS, Flekkefjord, Norway
	MV Fivla (II)	11	95	Bluemull (1985 - 2005); Relief (2005 - )	1985	Ferguson Ailsa, Troon
	MV Good Shepherd IV	2 (Craned on)	12	Fair Isle (1986 - )	1986	James N Miller & Son Ltd, St Monans, Fife
	MV Geira (II)	11	96	Yell Sound (1988 - 2002); Whalsay (2002 - 2005); Bluemull (2005 - )	1988	Dunstons, Hestle & Millers, Hessle, Yorkshire
	MV Bigga	14	96	Yell Sound (1991 - 2004); Relief (2004 - 2005); Bluemull (2005 - )	1991	James N Miller & Son Ltd, St Monans, Fife
	MV Leirna	19	124	Bressay (1992 - )	1992	Ferguson Marine, Port Glasgow
	MV New Advance (Operated by BK Marine)	1 (Craned on)	12	Foula (1996 - )	1996	Richardson's Boatyard, Stromness, Orkney
	MV Linga	18	95	Whalsay (2002 - )	2002	Stocznia Polnocna, Gdańsk
	MV Filla (II)	9	30	Out Skerries (2003 - )	2003	Northern Shipbuilders, Gdańsk
	MV Daggri	31	144	Yell Sound (2004 - )	2003	Northern Shipbuilders, Gdańsk
	MV Dagalien	31	144	Yell Sound (2004 - )	2004	Northern Shipbuilders, Gdańsk

== Proposed Future Fleet ==
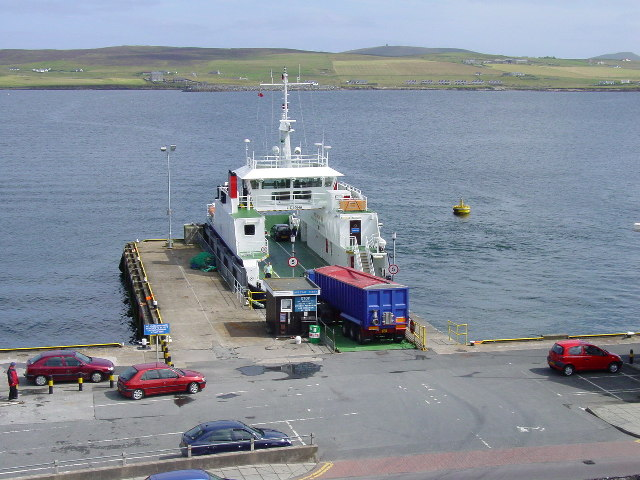
The Bressay Ferry, MV Leirna, at Lerwick

=== Fair Isle ===
In January 2023, £26.7 million was awarded by the UK Government, as part of the 'levelling up' fund, to the Shetland Islands Council for the purchase of a new ro-ro ferry for Fair Isle and new terminals at both the Grutness and Fair Isle ports, including linkspans. The new ferry is expected to be similar to the MV Snolda, with 25m length and capacity for about 4 cars and a crane. The work is due to be completed by April 2026. Works began at Grutness pier to facilitate this new vessel on 30 April 2025, with all Fair Isle sailings going to Lerwick until they are completed.

The contract was awarded to Parkol Marine Engineering, Whitby, Yorkshire on 10 June 2025, with an expected delivery date of October 2026. The vessel will be a faster and bigger monohull that will have additional lift on capability and ability to operate to the current linkspans. The design, which was done by Chartwell Marine, was presented on the news in September 2025, for delivery end of 2026. The first steel was cut for the ferry, to be named Good Shepherd V, on 13 November 2025.

=== New relief vessel ===
On 13 February 2025, the council revealed that they are looking into building a new vessel, which would possibly replace or operate alongside the current relief vessel, MV Fivla. This came after the Scottish Government gave the council £10 million funding for island connectivity, which will be used for this project. They put a due date for end of 2028, at which point the oldest vessel in the fleet will be 46 years old. Maritime unions and locals have expressed concerns over this fact due to ferries normally only having a lifespan of 25 years and half the fleet having a grandfather clause allowing them to have passenger accommodation below the waterline, making it inaccessible to many people. The council later came with a second option to make a vessel similar to MV Linga, which would operate alongside her at Whalsay, with MV Hendra then becoming a second spare vessel.

The tender for the new 33m max 500 GT relief vessel, designed by MacDuff ship design, went out on 29 January 2026. Delivery of the ferry is expected to be between 31 October 2028 and 31 March 2029. The full cost of the project is estimated to be £35.1 million. There is an option for two additional ferries however that is not being tendered at the moment.

=== Papa Stour (cancelled) ===
There is also a project involving Coastal Workboats and BK Marine to trial a fully electric ro-ro ferry between West Burrafirth and Papa Stour. The cost of project will be roughly £9 million, with £6 million of which funded by the UK Government's Clean Maritime Demonstration Competition. This trial is due to last 4 weeks from March 2025, in hope of it taking full time service, where it would take over from the regular vessel, MV Snolda, for the trial period. In April 2025, it was announced that the project will no longer take place on the Papa Stour route. The island community previously presented their concerns for the project going ahead with little to no consultation.

== Previous Fleet ==
The following vessels used to be part of the SIC ferries fleet, information left blank is unknown:

Image	Vessel Name	Cars	Passengers	Service	Launched	Left	Shipbuilders
	MV Westering Homewards (II)	N/A	12	Rejected Build, meant to be for Foula	1990	1990	Jones Buckie Slip & Shipyard Ltd, Buckie
	FV Ivy Leaf	N/A	12	Papa Stour (1981 - 1986 (Charter))		1986	
	MV Thora	10	93	Yell Sound (1976 - 1980 (summer), 1980 - 1991); Relief (1991 - 1998, 2002 - 2015); Whalsay (1998 - 2002)	1975	2015	Thorshavnor Skipasmidja, Faroe Isles
	MV Fylga	10	93	Yell Sound (1975 - 1976, 1982 - 1988); Whalsay (1976 - 1982); Bluemull (1988 - 2004)	1975	2005	Thorshavnor Skipasmidja, Faroe Isles
	MV Grima	10	93	Yell Sound (1974 - 1975 (summer spare)); Lerwick - Whalsay (1975 - 1976 (Charter)); Bressay (1976 - 1992); Whalsay (1993); Relief (1993 - 2004)	1974	2004	Bideford Shipyard, Devon
	MV Geira (I)	10	93	Yell - Unst (1973 - 1974); Bluemull (1974 - 1985)	1973	1986	Thorshavnor Skipasmidja, Faroe Isles
	MV Fivla (I)	10	93	Yell Sound (1973 - 1975, 1976 - 1982); Bressay (1975 - 1976)	1973	1982	Thorshavnor Skipasmidja, Faroe Isles
	MV Koada ex Good Shepherd III		12	Fair Isle (1972 - 1984 (local run), 1984 - 1986 (SIC)); Papa Stour (1986 - 2004); Foula (1990 - 1996)	1969	2004	Bideford Shipyard, Devon
	MV Westering Homewards (I)	N/A	12	Foula (1962 - 1978 (local run), 1978 - 1990 (SIC))	1962	1990	Shetland Isles
	MV Kjella	12	63	Whalsay (1980 - 1998); Relief (winter (normally Bressay & Yell Sound))	1957	1998	Kaarbos MY NS, Harstad, Norway
	MV Spes Clara		12	Out Skerries (1975 - 1983); Spare, Cargo to Isles (1983 - 2003)	1947	2003	Herd & McKenzie, Buckie
