= Good Shepherd IV =

Scottish ferry, connecting Fair Isle to Shetland Mainland

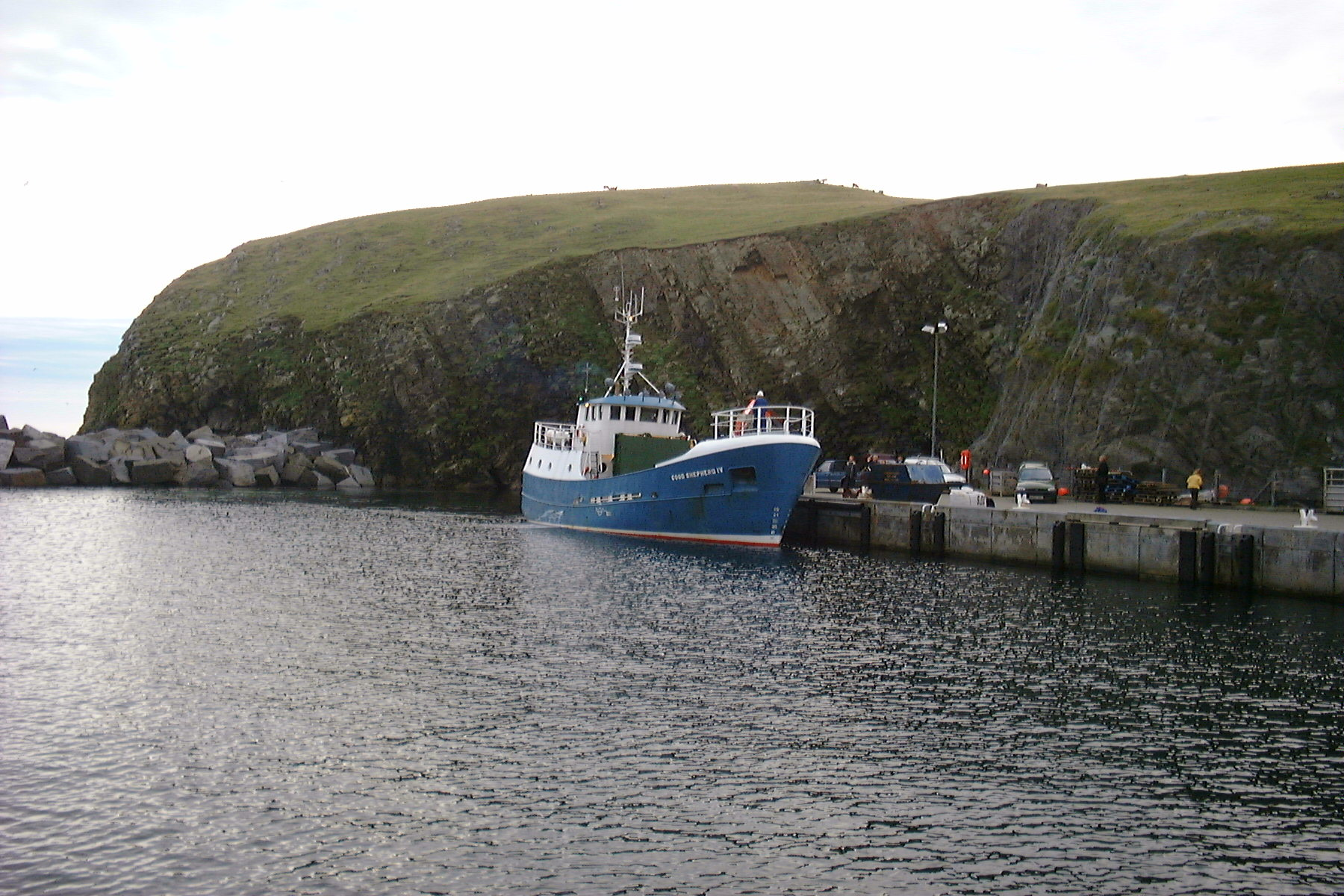
- Good Shepherd IV in Fair Isle harbour

History

United Kingdom
- Name: Good Shepherd IV
- Owner: Shetland Islands Council
- Operator: SIC Ferries
- Port of registry: Lerwick
- Route: Fair Isle
- Ordered: February 1985
- Builder: J W Miller & Sons, St Monans, Fife; Prefabricated by McTay Marine, Bromborough
- Yard number: 1024
- Launched: February 1986
- Maiden voyage: 24 May 1986
- Identification: MMSI number: 232003605; Callsign: GFXQ

General characteristics
- Tonnage: Gross Tonnage: 76.38; Net Tonnage: 45.33; Deadweight Tonnage: 54.2
- Displacement: 125.6 tonnes
- Length: 18.3 m (60 ft 0 in)
- Beam: 5.8 m (19 ft 0 in)
- Draught: 2.63 m (8 ft 8 in) (max)
- Depth: 3.168 m (10 ft 4.7 in)
- Propulsion: 1 × Volvo TMD 121C 6 cyl 12 litre 239kW / 315hp
- Speed: 9 knots (17 km/h; 10 mph)
- Capacity: 12 Passengers; 1 Car (Craned Onboard)

Good Shepherd IV is a Scottish ferry, connecting Fair Isle to Shetland Mainland. It is owned and operated by SIC Ferries.

== History ==
The ship, built in St Monans, Fife, has been in service since 1986 and is operated by the Shetland Islands Council.

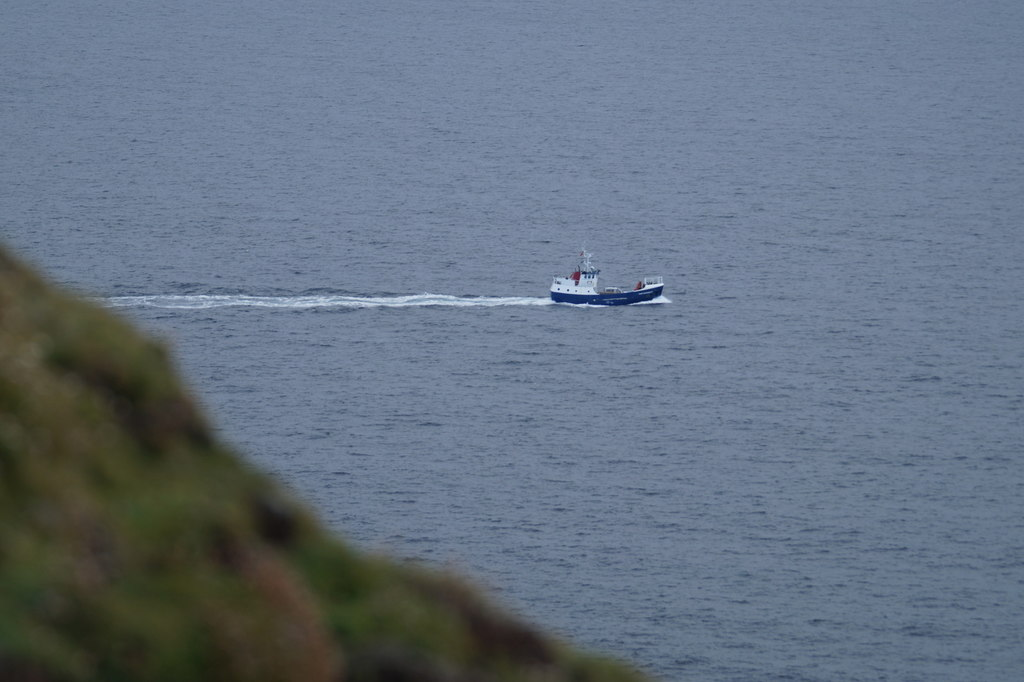
MV Good Shepherd IV passing Sumburgh Head.

The previous ferry on this route, Good Shepherd III, was a former inshore trawler, owned by the islanders since 1972.

== Service ==
The ferry carries up to 12 passengers and one car.

There are sailings three times a week from Grutness Pier near Sumburgh Head in summer and one per week in winter. In the summer only, there are fortnightly sailings to Lerwick, the capital of Shetland.

== Replacement Ferry ==
A news report in September 2020 indicated that some members of Council believed that the 31-year-old Good Shepherd IV was due for replacement but that Holyrood had not authorized that expenditure. Councillor Allison Duncan was quoted as saying, "I think it's despicable that they can't at least look after one of our remote islands by giving them the boat that they justly deserve."

In January 2023, £26.7 million was awarded by the UK Government, as part of the 'levelling up' fund, to the Shetland Islands Council for the purchase of a new ro-ro ferry for Fair Isle and new terminals at both the Grutness and Fair Isle ports, including linkspans. The new ferry is expected to be similar to the MV Snolda, with 25m length and capacity for about 4 cars and a crane. The work is due to be completed by April 2026.
