= MV Filla (2003) =

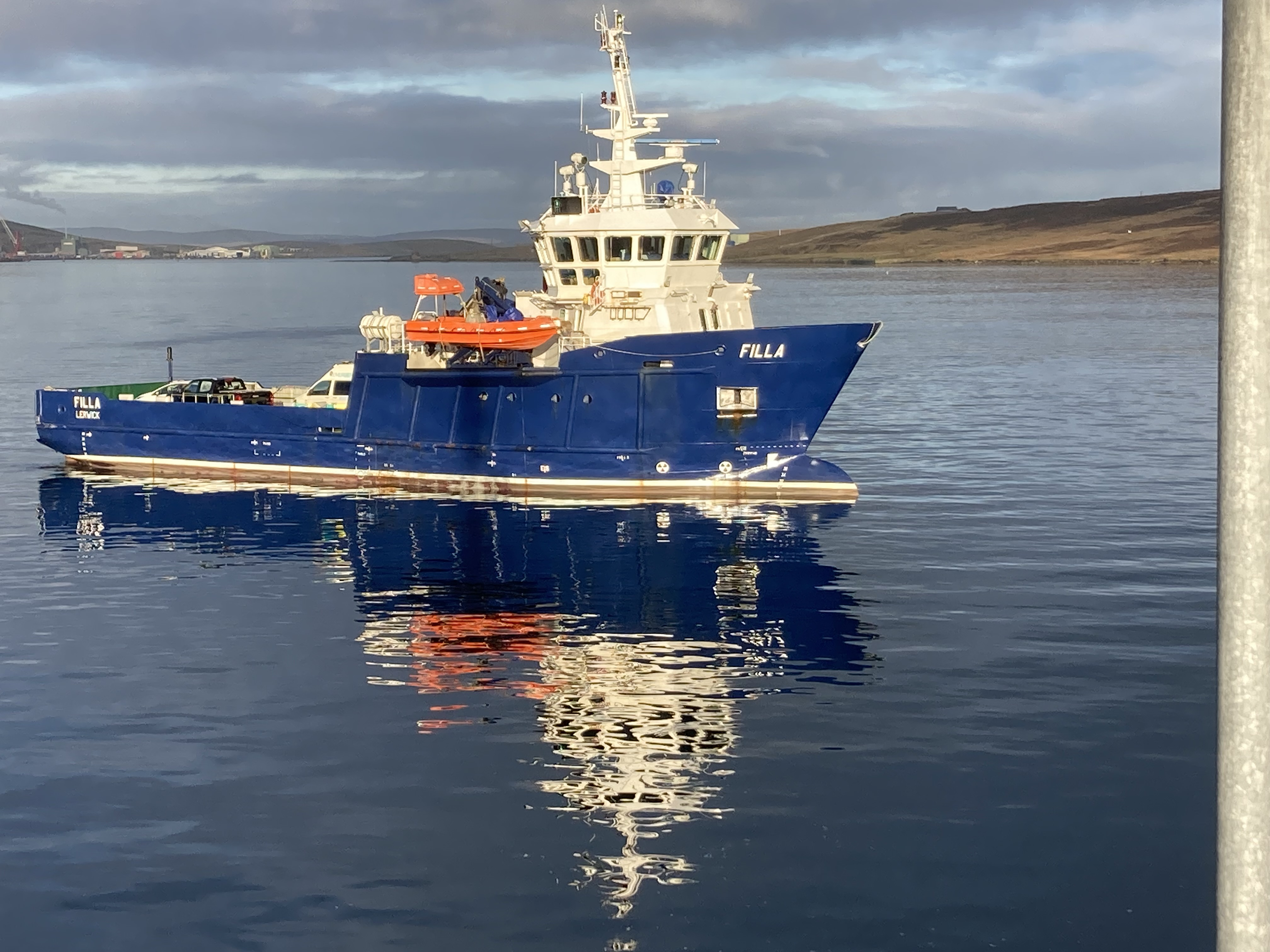
- MV Filla awaiting to berth at the linkspan in Lerwick

History

United Kingdom
- Name: Filla
- Namesake: Filla, Out Skerries
- Owner: Shetland Islands Council
- Operator: SIC Ferries
- Port of registry: Lerwick
- Route: Out Skerries (2003–)
- Builder: Northern Shipbuilders, Gdańsk, Poland
- Launched: 20 May 2003
- Completed: 2003
- In service: 2 October 2003
- Identification: IMO number: 9269192
- Status: In service

General characteristics
- Type: Ro-ro vehicle and passenger ferry
- Tonnage: 356 GT; 126 NT; 159 DWT
- Displacement: 559.4
- Length: 35.5 m (116 ft 6 in)
- Beam: 9.0 m (29 ft 6 in)
- Draught: 3.05 m (10 ft 0 in)
- Depth: 4.2 m (13 ft 9 in)
- Ramps: Aft ramp
- Installed power: 671 kW (900 hp) at 1,600 rpm; 2 × Mitsubishi SI2R MPTA Generators
- Propulsion: Diesel-electric; Twin screw; 2 × bow thruster
- Speed: 12 knots (22 km/h; 14 mph)
- Boats & landing craft carried: 1 × fast rescue boat
- Capacity: 30 passengers; 9 cars; 1 Artic
- Crew: 4

MV Filla is a ro-ro passenger ferry operated by the SIC Ferries. She operates on the Vidlin or Symbister, Whalsay or Lerwick to Out Skerries service.

== History ==
Filla was the second of four vessels built for the council at the turn of the century. She was named after the Island of Filla, which is within the archipelago of the Out Skerries.

== Layout ==
The Filla has three lanes on her car deck. Her passenger lounge and crew accommodation is all forward of the car deck. She only has one ramp, meaning cars have to reverse onto the ferry and then drive straight off. There is a Hiab crane fitted to her to allow easy loading of cargo.

== Service ==
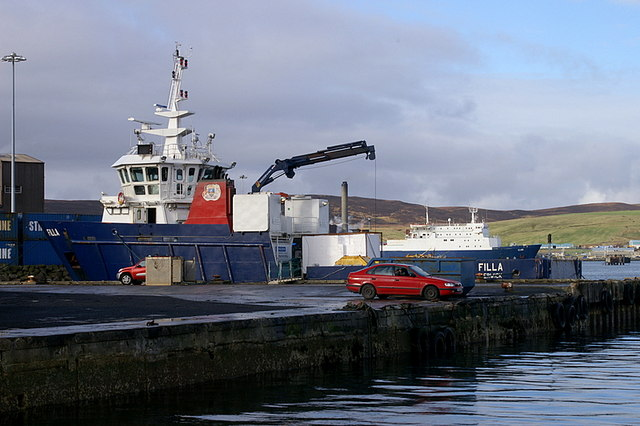
Filla berthed at Hay's Dock in Lerwick

Entering service on the 2 October 2003 on the Out Skerries service, Filla took over her predecessor, MV Filla , the current MV Snolda. She was then refitted and transferred to the Papa Stour service.

When carrying out sailings to Lerwick, she berths at the linkspan to discharge vehicles, then moves to a layby berth, depending on availability, to load cargo, before returning to the linkspan to load vehicles for the departure back to the Skerries. The timetable gives a few hours in Lerwick to allow the Skerries residents time ashore in the town before returning home the same day. She cannot lie at the linkspan for the whole time in Lerwick since it is the same linkspan that the Bressay ferry uses.

Filla makes the additional sailings on the Whalsay service from Laxo to Symbister, such as to cover the maintenance period on Mondays or during breakdowns. Filla used to make the occasional sailing to Fair Isle for cargo, outwith her normal published timetable.
