= MV Hendra =

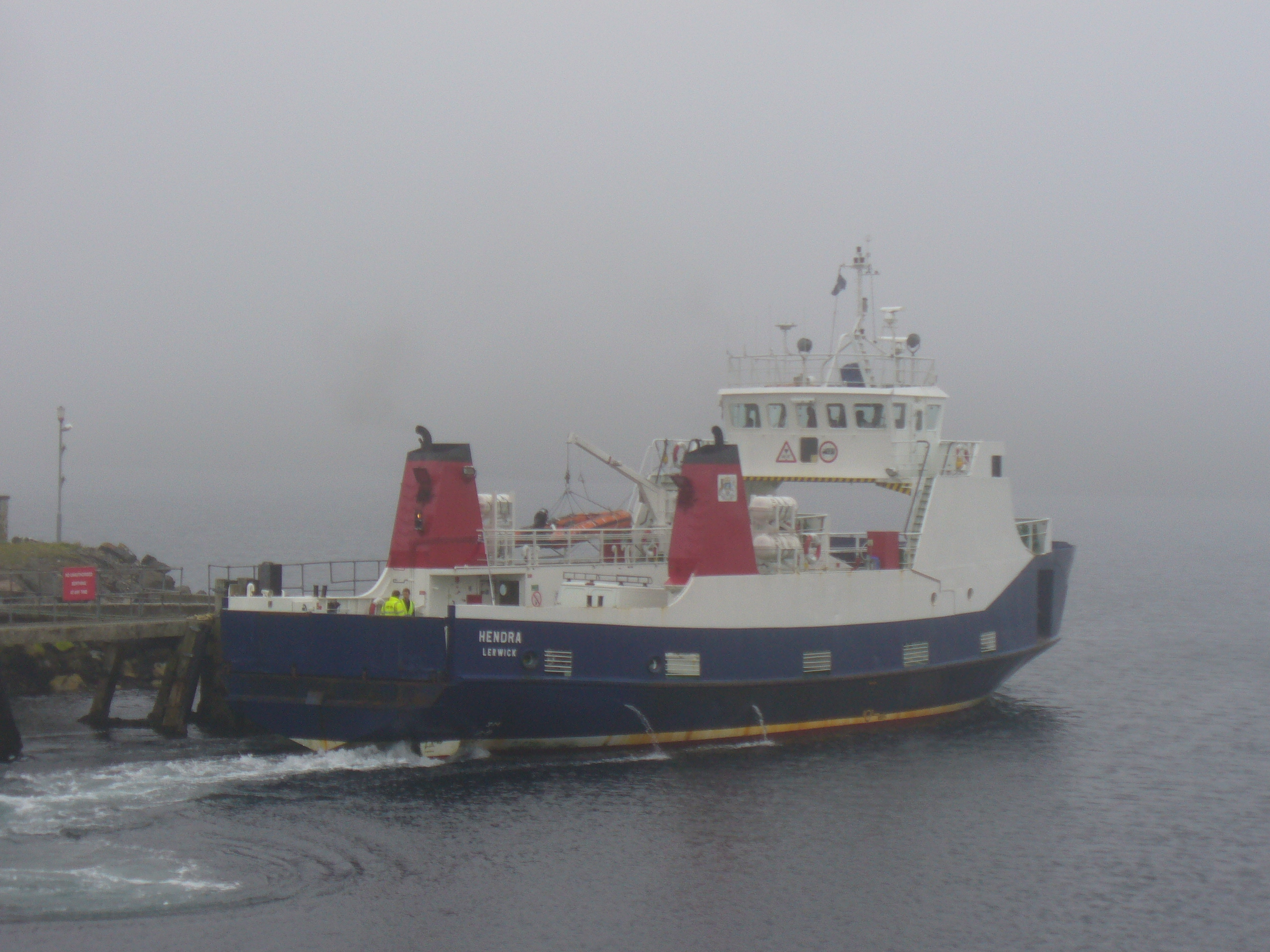
- MV Hendra departing from Laxo

History

United Kingdom
- Name: Hendra
- Owner: Shetland Islands Council
- Operator: SIC Ferries
- Port of registry: Lerwick
- Route: Whalsay (1982–2002, 2005–present ); Yell Sound (2002–2004); Bluemull (2004–2005)
- Builder: McTay Marine, Bromborough, Merseyside
- Yard number: 45
- Launched: September 1982
- Completed: 1982
- In service: 30 November 1982
- Identification: IMO number: 8200254
- Status: In service

General characteristics
- Class & type: MCA Class IV ro-ro vehicle and passenger ferry
- Tonnage: 248 GT; 74 NT; 111.65 DWT
- Displacement: 343.45
- Length: 33.63 m (110 ft 4 in)
- Beam: 9.68 m (31 ft 9 in)
- Draught: 2.61 m (8 ft 7 in)
- Depth: 3.66 m (12 ft 0 in)
- Ramps: Fore and aft ramps and bow visor
- Installed power: 2 × 328 kW (440 hp) at 1,200 rpm
- Propulsion: 2 x Volvo Penta TAMD 165C; 1 × bow thruster
- Speed: 11.5 knots (21.3 km/h; 13.2 mph)
- Boats & landing craft carried: 1 × rescue boat
- Capacity: 95/87 passengers summer; 50 passengers winter; 13 cars; 1 Artic
- Crew: 5

MV Hendra is a ro-ro passenger ferry operated by the SIC Ferries. She operates as the day vessel on the Laxo or Vidlin to Symbister, Whalsay service.

== History ==
Hendra was bought as the first of the second batch of new builds for the council since they took over the inter-island ferry services in the early 1970s. She currently is the oldest ferry in the council's fleet at 44 years old. Having been in local news due to this causing issues with passenger accessibility.

== Layout ==
The Hendra has two lanes on her car deck. Like most SIC Ferries her size she has a passenger lounge located beneath the car deck.

== Service ==
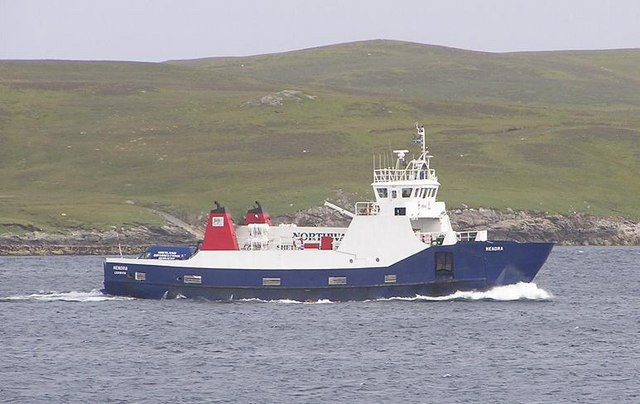
Hendra approaching Symbister

Entering service on 30 November 1982 on the Whalsay service, taking over from MV Fylga, which took over the Yell Sound service. Hendra operated alongside MV Kjella then MV Thora until 2002, when she was moved to Yell Sound. She operated alongside MV Bigga until the two new Yell ferries were introduced in 2004. Hendra then briefly operated on the Bluemull Sound before returning to Whalsay in 2005, where she still operates, as the day vessel, alongside MV Linga. MV Geira (II) had operated as second vessel at Whalsay while MV Hendra was operating elsewhere.

Hendra operated the whole week before 2014, when due to cuts she began to only operate Monday - Friday. Saturday service was reintroduced for the second vessel in Whalsay in 2022.

Due to an issue with the Toft linkspan, she operated a special service between Vidlin and Ulsta, Yell from 29 April and 4 May 2010.

Hendra has on occasion operated as relief such as to Bressay on 11 November 2015 and 23 October 2019.

She has also occasionally operated to Skerries when no other vessel was available, sometimes in between Whalsay sailings.
