= MV Geira =

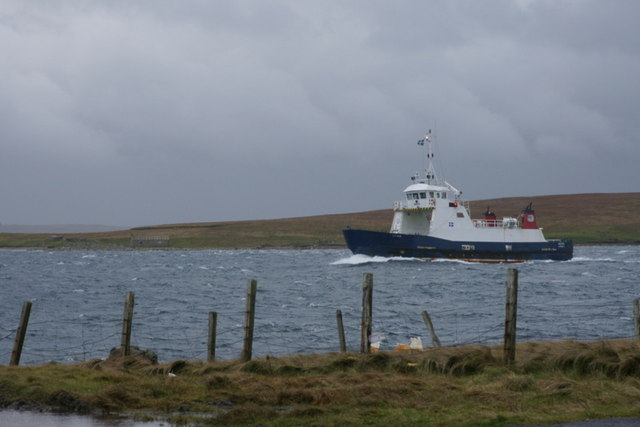
- MV Geira approaching Gutcher, Yell from Fetlar.

History

United Kingdom
- Name: MV Geira (II)
- Owner: Shetland Islands Council
- Operator: SIC Ferries
- Port of registry: Lerwick
- Route: Yell Sound (1988 - 2002); Whalsay (2002 - 2005); Bluemull Sound (2005 - )
- Builder: Richard_Dunston, Hessle, Yorkshire
- Completed: 1988
- In service: 2 July 1988
- Refit: Once a year
- Identification: IMO number: 8712489; MMSI number: 232003604; Callsign: MJPA7
- Status: In Service

General characteristics
- Type: Ro-Ro Vehicle & Passenger Ferry
- Tonnage: Gross Tonnage: 226; Net Tonnage: 69; Deadweight Tonnage: 103.7
- Displacement: 335.7
- Length: 30 m (98.4 ft)
- Beam: 9.0 m (29.5 ft)
- Draught: 2.612 m (8.6 ft)
- Depth: 3.85 m (12.6 ft)
- Decks: 4 (2 Passenger)
- Ramps: Bow and Stern ramps and a Bow Visor
- Installed power: 2 x Kelvin TASC8 @ 470kW each (until 2025); 2 x Volvo D13 (from 2026)
- Propulsion: Twin screw; 1x Bow Thruster
- Speed: 10 knots
- Capacity: 96 passengers; 11 cars; 1 Artic
- Crew: 4

MV Geira is a ro-ro passenger and car ferry that operates on the Bluemull sound service, operated by SIC Ferries. She is based in Hamars Ness, on Fetlar.

== History ==
She is the second MV Geira built for SIC Ferries, the first being built in 1973 as a part of the first batch of inter-island ferries for the council. Out of the four vessels built around the same time, at different yards and to slightly different specification, MV Geira is closest in design to MV Fivla (II).

== Layout ==
MV Geira has 2 lanes on her car deck. Like most SIC Ferries her size she has a passenger lounge located beneath the car deck.

== Service ==
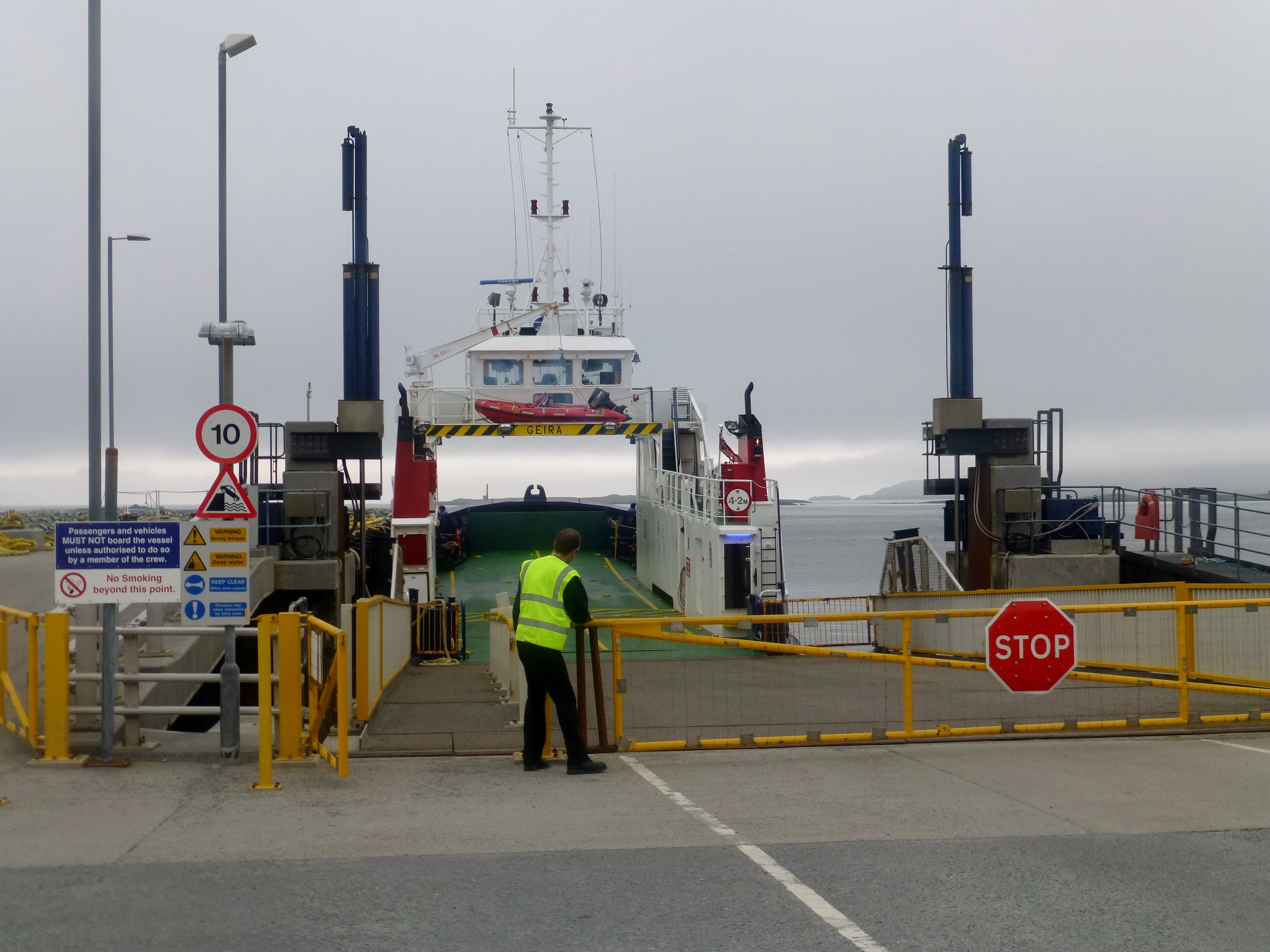
MV Geira berthed at Fetlar.

Between 1988 and 2002, MV Geira operated on the Yell Sound route. She operated alongside MV Thora, and the then new MV Bigga.

From 2002, MV Geira operated on the Whalsay route alongside MV Linga. Where they had replaced MV Hendra, which replaced her again in 2005, and MV Thora on the route.

In 2005, when replaced by MV Hendra, she was transferred to the Bluemull Sound route, operating as the day vessel based out of Fetlar. Geira operates 6 days a week, however there was no second vessel on Bluemull on Saturdays until 2006 and from 2014 until 2025, when it was reintroduced.

Due to an issue with the Toft linkspan, she operated a special service between Vidlin and Ulsta, Yell from 29 April to 4 May 2010.

Due to getting her engines changed Geira was out of service from 18 October 2025 until 23 May 2026, this was done on the Malakoff slip and Shearer's dock in Lerwick. Her shafts, propellers, gearboxes and generators are also being refurbished. Due to the extended length of the docking, Whalsay, Bluemull and Yell sound have had to go single vessel during different periods. She carried out many sea trials in and around Lerwick and had an extra dry dock visit before going back into service on 23 May 2026 taking over from MV Fivla.
