= MV Leirna =

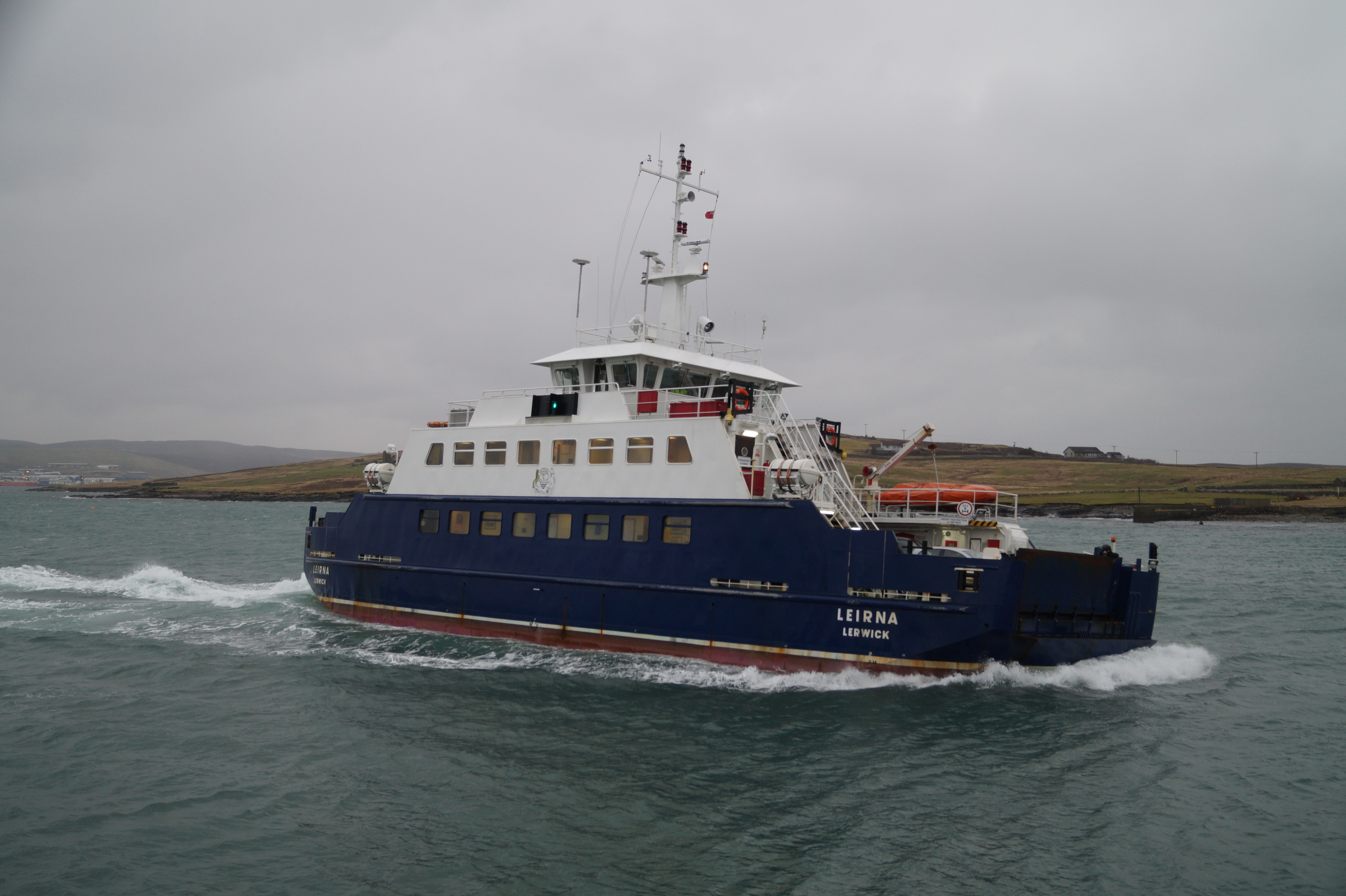
- MV Leirna turning to starboard arriving in Bressay.

History

United Kingdom
- Name: MV Leirna
- Namesake: Leiraness, Bressay
- Owner: Shetland Islands Council
- Operator: SIC Ferries
- Port of registry: Lerwick
- Route: Lerwick - Bressay
- Builder: Ferguson Shipbuilders, Port Glasgow
- Yard number: 605
- Laid down: 1991
- Launched: 27 August 1992
- Completed: 1992
- In service: 14 November 1992
- Refit: Once a year, normally June
- Identification: IMO number: 9050199
- Motto: "Handles Doon!"
- Status: In Service

General characteristics
- Class & type: MCA Class IV
- Type: Ro-Ro Vehicle & Passenger Ferry
- Tonnage: Gross Tonnage: 420; Net Tonnage: 126; Deadweight Tonnage: 158
- Length: 32.45 m (106.5 ft)
- Beam: 10.7 m (35.1 ft)
- Draft: 1.72 m (5.6 ft)
- Depth: 3.69 m (12.1 ft)
- Ramps: MacGregor bow and stern ramps
- Installed power: 2 x Kelvins (until 2013); 2 x Mitsubishi @ 313kW each (from 2013)
- Propulsion: 2x Voith Schneider Units
- Speed: 8 knots (15 km/h; 9.2 mph)
- Boats & landing craft carried: 1 Doti boat for 6 persons; 2 Liferafts for 100 persons each
- Capacity: 124 passengers (formerly 80 with 4 crew); 19 cars; 2 artics; 94.5 tonnes
- Crew: 5; 4 (with no passengers)

MV Leirna is a double ended ro-ro passenger ferry operated by SIC Ferries. She operates between Bressay and Lerwick.

== History ==
As vehicles grew in size and more and more islanders started to drive, the need for a larger ferry was identified. The previous Bressay ferry MV Grima was simply too small for Bressay's needs. Plans were drawn up for a larger modern ferry, the Leirna. MV Leirna was built by Ferguson Shipbuilders, Glasgow in 1992. As one of the first "New" ferries, and the first double ended ferry, in the SIC she is widely considered the flagship of the fleet.

She is operated by the local authority and provides the lifeline Bressay service between the Maryfield terminal on Bressay and the Esplanade terminal in Lerwick.

Leirna's engines were replaced during her docking in 2013, when it was stated that she could run for another 25 years and replace her before she is 50 or 60 years old.

== Layout ==
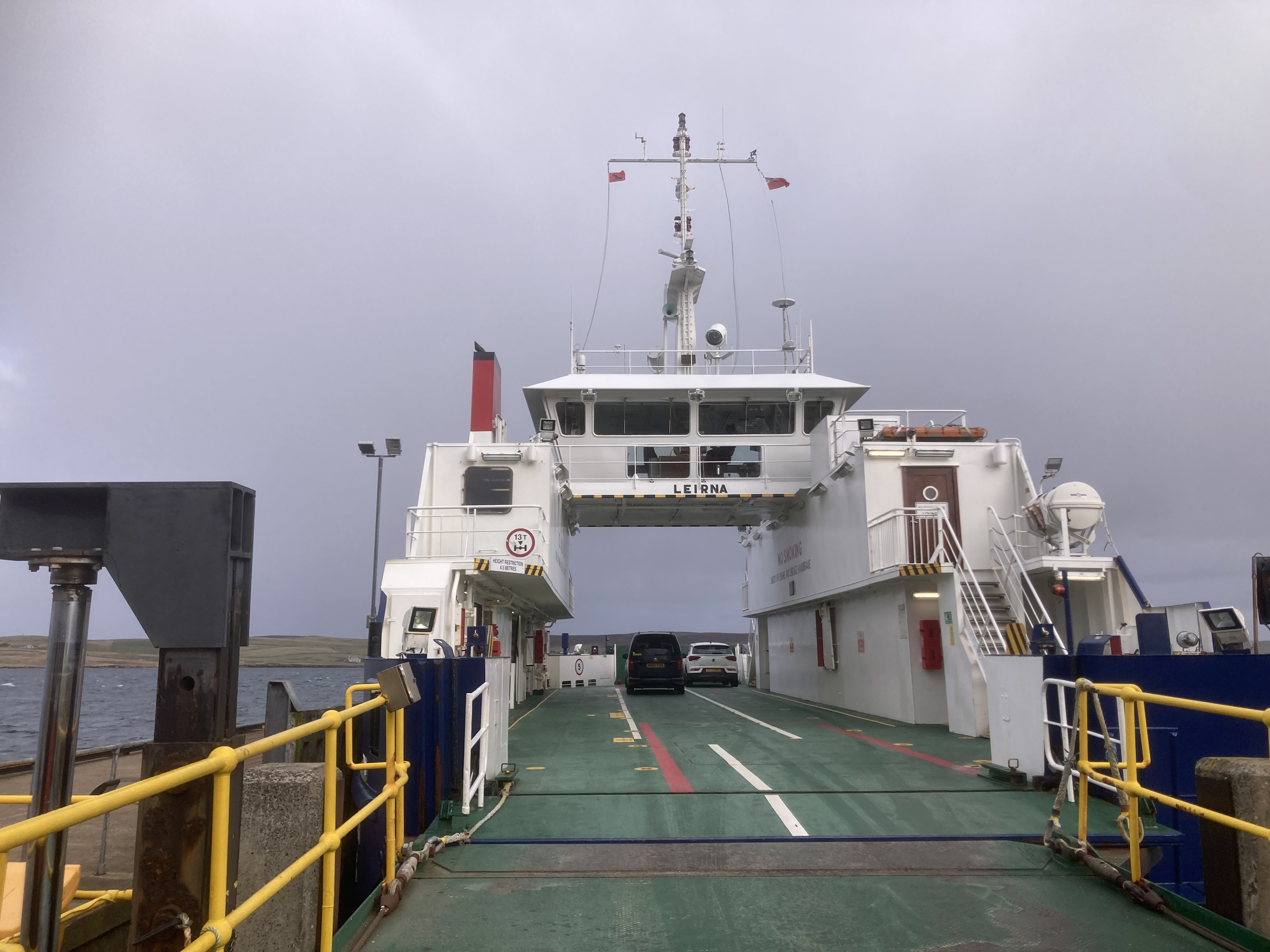
MV Leirna berthed in Lerwick.

MV Leirna has a main car deck with 3 lanes for vehicles. The crew and passenger accommodation overhangs on the outer two lanes and therefore high vehicles cannot be fully in those lanes.

There are two passenger saloons with excellent views across Lerwick harbour. Situated in the upper passenger saloon there is a non operational vending machine with a selection of hot and cold drinks. Each saloon has a toilet.

== Service ==
The Leirna operates the Bressay Ferry Service linking Lerwick on the Shetland Mainland to Maryfield, Bressay. She was purpose-built for this route.

In her whole career she hasn't been outside the Bressay Sound other than to go south for her annual docking, which takes place in Fraserburgh every year. It used to be every two years in Fraserburgh with the alternate year being alongside in Lerwick. She has in the past dry docked in Buckie and Lerwick, when the old floating dry dock was still there.

In recent years, during docking periods MV Fivla (II) is the relief vessel taking her place as the Bressay ferry. However, MV Bigga (2004, 2008), MV Hendra (2015, 2019) or, before their sale, MV Kjella (1997) and MV Grima (1992 - 2004), her predecessor, have taken MV Leirna's place during dockings or breakdowns. There has been a few times when MV Leirna or her relief breaks down with no other relief ferry available and the harbour pilot tug, MV Knab, is brought in to carry out some sailings so that people can get home. Though she can only take 12 passengers at a time.
