= MV Filla =

MV Filla is the name of the following ships:

- MV Filla (1983), renamed MV Snolda
- MV Filla (2003)

== See also ==
- Filla
