= MV Fivla =

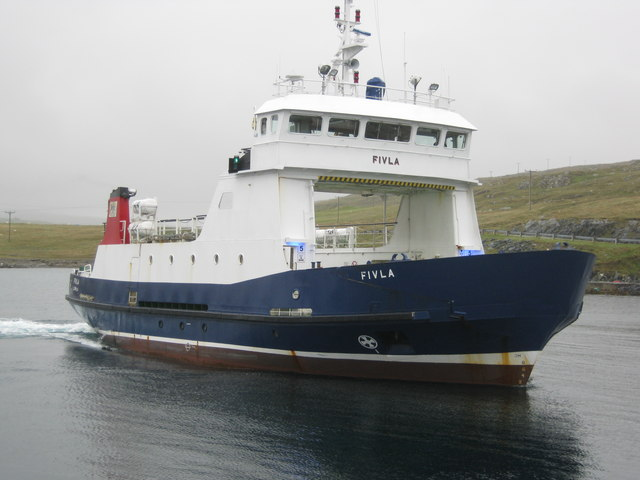
- MV Fivla arriving in Belmont, Unst

History

United Kingdom
- Name: Fivla
- Owner: Shetland Islands Council
- Operator: SIC Ferries
- Port of registry: Lerwick
- Route: Bluemull Sound (1985–2005); Relief (2005–present)
- Builder: Ferguson Ailsa, Troon
- Yard number: 566
- Launched: 12 February 1985
- Completed: 8 April 1985
- In service: 22 April 1985
- Identification: IMO number: 8410237
- Status: In service

General characteristics
- Class & type: MCA Class IV ro-ro vehicle and passenger ferry
- Tonnage: 230 GT; 69 NT; 107.7 DWT
- Displacement: 335.7
- Length: 30.0 m (98 ft 5 in)
- Beam: 9.0 m (29 ft 6 in)
- Draught: 2.612 m (8 ft 6.8 in)
- Depth: 3.85 m (12 ft 8 in)
- Ramps: Fore and aft ramps and bow visor
- Installed power: 2 × 373 kW (500 hp) at 1,600 rpm
- Propulsion: 2 × Kelvin TASC8 (until 2025); 2 x Volvo Penta D13 (from 2025); 1 × bow thruster
- Speed: 11.5 knots (21.3 km/h; 13.2 mph)
- Boats & landing craft carried: 1 × rescue boat
- Capacity: 95/75 passengers; 11 cars; 1 Artic
- Crew: 5/4

MV Fivla is a ro-ro passenger ferry operated by the SIC Ferries. She operates as the fleet relief vessel.

== History ==
Fivla was bought as the third of the second batch of new builds, the second of a similar style yet having different specifications, for the council since they took over the inter-island ferry services in the early 1970s. She is the second ship named Fivla built for the council, the first being the first of the first batch of inter-island ferries, operating from 1973 to 1982 for the council.

== Layout ==
The Fivla has two lanes on her car deck. Like most SIC Ferries her size she has a passenger lounge located beneath the car deck.

== Service ==
Entering service on 22 April 1985 on the Bluemull Sound service, taking over from the original MV Geira, which was then sold out of the fleet. She operated alone on the Gutcher, Yell - Belmont, Unst - Oddsta, Fetlar service until 1988 when she was joined by MV Fylga.

Once the two new Yell ferries were introduced in 2004, MV Hendra briefly replaced Fylga on the service, before MV Bigga joined her by May 2005. This is the same year that the Fetlar terminal changed from Oddsta to Hamars Ness.

Due to a vessel change, on 3 October 2005, Fivla was replaced by MV Geira (II) and relegated to the fleet relief vessel, which she still operates as today. Each month she covers a different ro-ro ferry in the fleet so that they can go for their annual refit. She also covers any breakdowns that occur across the fleet. The only rest the ferry gets is when she goes for her own annual refit, normally on the Malakoff slip in Lerwick.

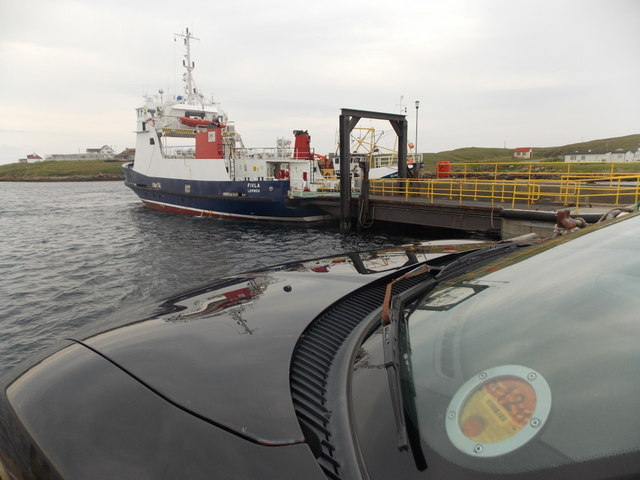
MV Fivla in Skerries

On 28 April 2010, while carrying out refit cover in Yell Sound, she was trapped underneath the linkspan in Toft. This was due to four preventer chains on the linkspan snapping simultaneously from the low spring tides and the lower freeboard of the relief vessel. Due to this, during the following days (29 April and 4 May 2010), she operated a special service between Vidlin and Ulsta, Yell.

Due to getting her engines changed Fivla was out of service from 16 September 2024 until 28 February 2025, this was done on the Malakoff slip and alongside in Lerwick. Her shafts, propellers, gearboxes and generators were also being refurbished. Due to the extended length of the docking, Whalsay, Bluemull and Yell sound have had to go single vessel during different periods.
