= MV Bigga =

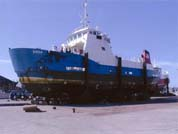
- MV Bigga in the ship's cradle at Fraserburgh

History

United Kingdom
- Name: Bigga
- Namesake: Island of Bigga
- Owner: Shetland Islands Council
- Operator: SIC Ferries
- Port of registry: Lerwick
- Route: Yell Sound (1991 - 2004); Relief (2004 - 2005); Bluemull Sound (2005 –)
- Builder: J W Miller & Sons, St Monans, Fife
- Yard number: 1043
- Completed: 1991
- In service: 19 April 1991
- Refit: Once a year, normally August - September
- Identification: IMO number: 9000821; MMSI number: 232003606; Callsign: MNXZ2
- Status: In service

General characteristics
- Type: Ro-ro vehicle/passenger ferry
- Tonnage: 274 GT; 82 NT; 104.3 DWT
- Displacement: 404
- Length: 33.45 m (109 ft 9 in)
- Beam: 10.1 m (33 ft 2 in)
- Draught: 2.612 m (8 ft 6.8 in)
- Depth: 3.85 m (12 ft 8 in)
- Decks: 4 (2 Passenger)
- Ramps: Fore and aft ramps and bow visor
- Installed power: 2 x 410 kW (550 hp) at 1,300 rpm 2 x Mitsubishi S6R2-MPTK
- Propulsion: Twin screw; 1 × bow thruster
- Speed: 11.5 knots (21.3 km/h; 13.2 mph)
- Boats & landing craft carried: 1 × rescue boat
- Capacity: 96/50 passengers; 16 cars (size-dependent); 1 Artic
- Crew: 5/4

MV Bigga is a ro-ro passenger ferry operated by the SIC Ferries. She operates as the shift vessel on the Bluemull Sound service.

== History ==
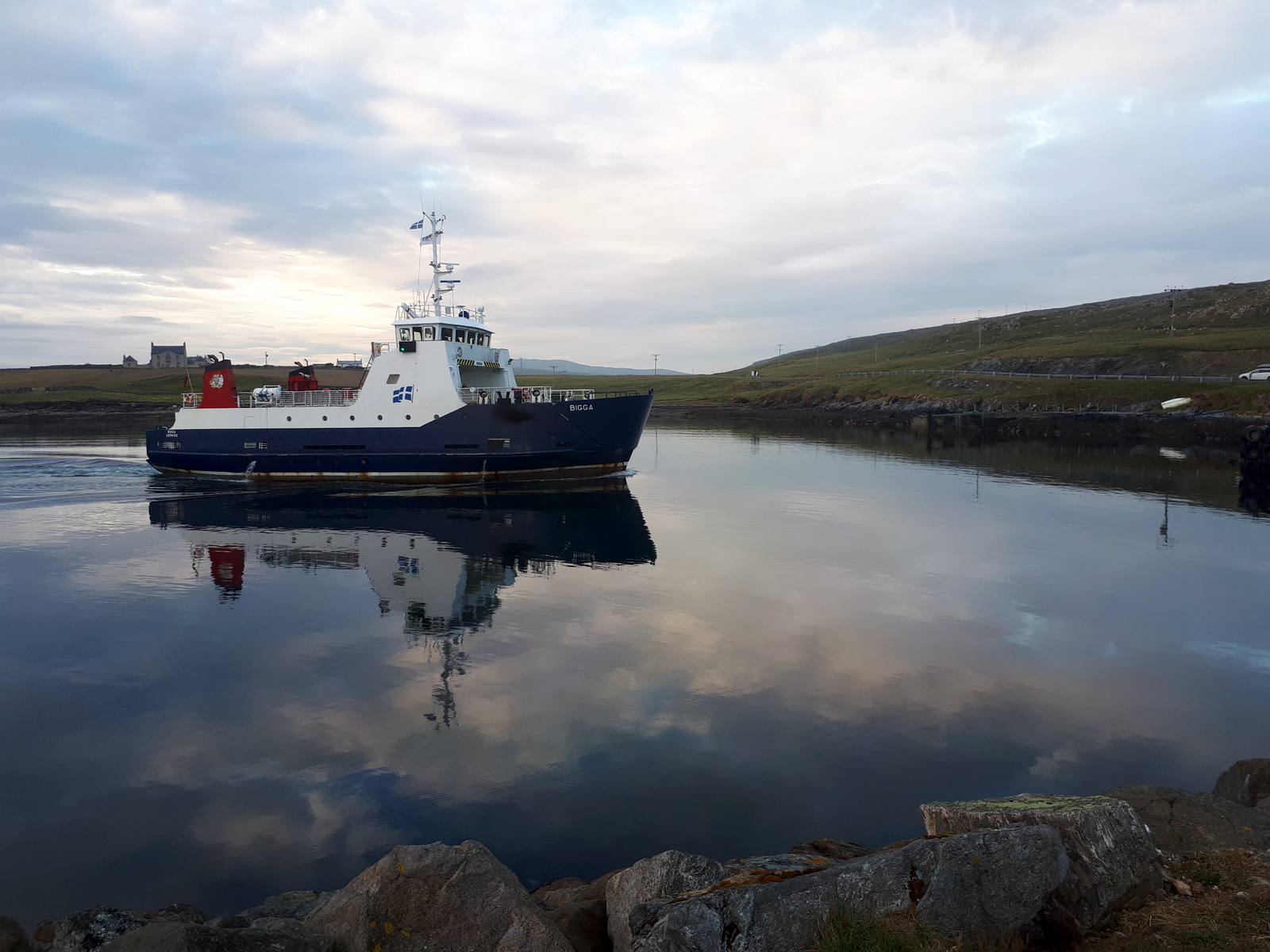
Bigga approaching Belmont, Unst.

Bigga is the last of four similar ferries built for the council in 1980s and 1990s. Out of the four vessels built around the same time, at different yards and to slightly different specification, Bigga is closest in design to MV Fivla with the same hull form, except a wider superstructure above the waterline allowing her to have more deck space.

== Layout ==
Bigga was the first true three-lane ferry built for the council. However, due to sizes of vehicles now, normally only two lanes are used on her car deck. Just like other SIC ferries her size, Bigga has a passenger lounge located beneath the car deck.

== Service ==
Entering service on 19 April 1991 on the Yell Sound route, Bigga, sailed alongside MV Geira (II) until 2002, when she was replaced by MV Hendra. They ran together until the two new Yell ferries came into service in 2004. She then acted as the relief vessel for a year before being transferred to the Bluemull Sound route, joining MV Fivla (II). However, due to a vessel reshuffle, on 3 October 2005 Geira joined her instead. These two ferries still operate the Bluemull Sound service today.

Bigga has done some relief across the SIC fleet, such as on the Bressay service in 2008.
