= Good Shepherd V =

Ferry boat in Scotalnd

History

United Kingdom
- Name: Good Shepherd V
- Owner: Shetland Islands Council
- Operator: SIC Ferries
- Port of registry: Lerwick
- Route: Fair Isle
- Awarded: June 2025
- Builder: Parkol Marine Engineering
- Yard number: 070

General characteristics
- Length: 26 m (85 ft)
- Capacity: 12 Passengers

Good Shepherd V is a future Scottish ferry, that will be used to connect Fair Isle to the Shetland Mainland in Scotland. It will be owned and operated by SIC Ferries and will replace the ferry Good Shepherd IV. As the name suggests, the boat will be the fifth vessel to ply the route between Fair Isle and the mainland of Shetland.

== History ==
A business case to deliver a new ferry for Fair Isle and associated works with an extended ferry terminal and new breakwater at Grutness, including the ability to left the vessel out of the water during very bad weather, was developed in 2024. The total cost of the works was costed at £45 million in 2024, with £26.7 million coming from the UK Government's Levelling Up Fund and £18.7 million from the Shetland Islands Council. Work on the boat started in November 2026 at the Parkol Marine shipyard in Whitby, North Yorkshire, England. By November 2026, when the boat was unveiled in the Parkol Marine shipyard, the project was costed at £45.4 million, with the boat itself costing £5.6 million.

Good Shepherd V will be a replacement for Good Shepherd IV, which has been in service to and from Fair Isle since 1986; and as the name suggests, the new boat will be the fifth vessel to be used on the route between Fair Isle and the mainland of Shetland. The Good Shepherd IV has been described as "..unreliable, noisy, slow and uncomfortable...[but] has been a loyal and valuable servant." The ferry connects Fair isle with the mainland of Shetland, which is some 24 miles (39 km) away to the north. It had been hoped to build a ro-ro ferry and terminal, but the "constraints of the vessel and harbour" meant that the same crane/lift operation as the previous vessel was retained.

Parkol Marine Engineering have stated that the boat will be 26 metres (85 ft) long, (Note: All news reports state the boat to be 24 metres (79 ft) long.) and has a yard number of 070. Detailed design work for the vessel was undertaken by Chartwell Marine. The boat will feature a bulbous bow, an enhanced hull, and a controllable-pitch propeller system that enables the vessel to operate in rough seas around the island and the ferry crossing route. It will also have a large storage hold, a ship-mounted crane to enable cargo and vehicles to lifted on and off the boat, and accommodation for four crew. The boat will have the capacity to carry 12 passengers.
