= Snabrough broch =

Iron Age ruin in Scotland

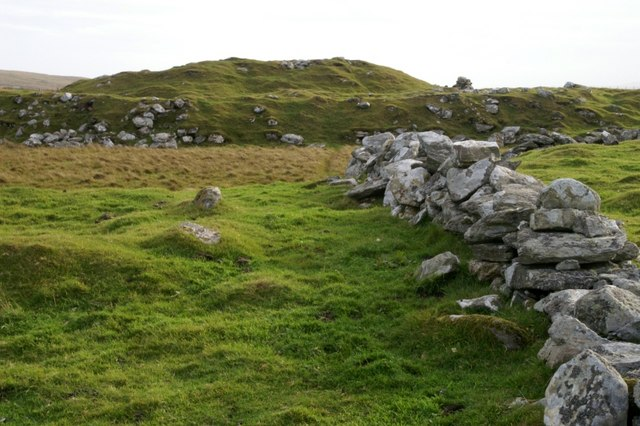
- Snabrough broch in the background

- Location within Shetland
- 60.703433°N 0.961347°W
- Type: Broch
- Periods: Iron Age
- Location: Unst, Shetland

Snabrough broch is a ruined broch located on the island of Unst in Shetland, Scotland. It overlooks Snabrough Loch.

== Location ==
Snabrough Broch overlooks Snabrough Loch, south of Burragarth on Unst. It is about 0.5 kilometres (0.31 mi) east of Bluemull Sound. It stands on a short, low promontory on the loch shore, and is surrounded to the north by rolling cultivable land.

== Description ==
Snabrough Broch has an external diameter of around 18 metres (60 ft). Little of its structure can be seen, but traces of the inner and outer faces of the broch wall are on the southeast side. The entrance is on the northwest side, but is filled with debris. The broch was visited in the 18th century by antiquarian George Low, who noted "large hollow apartments ... following the curve of the wall"; these are no longer visible.

On the landward side of the broch there was an outer wall or rampart with a ditch, which curved across the broad neck of the promontory. Between the outer wall and the broch there may have been some out-buildings.
