= Symbister House =

Symbister House Whalsay Secondary School
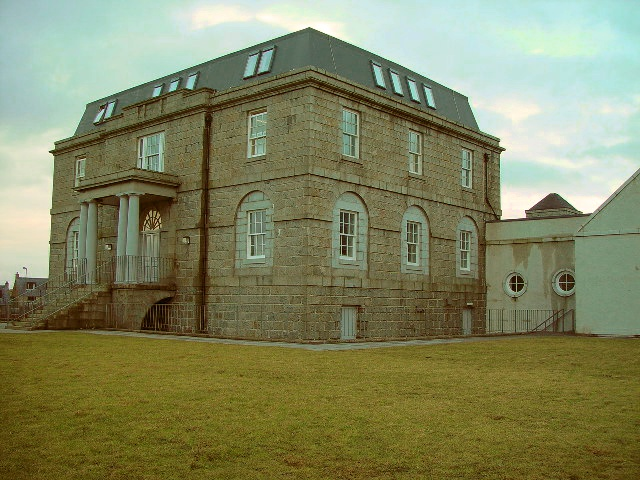
- Symbister House in 2008

- Location within Shetland Location within Scotland
- 60°20′20″N 1°1′13″W
- Location: Whalsay, Scotland, United Kingdom

History
- Built: 1823

Site notes
- Architectural style: Georgian architecture

Listed Building – Category B
- Official name: Symbister House

Symbister House is a former country house in Symbister, Whalsay island, in the Shetland islands of Scotland. It was built in 1823 by the Bruce family who were lairds (landlords) of the island for about 300 years from the 16th century. Since 1964 it has been the Whalsay Secondary School, after it fell into disuse following the death of the last of the landlord occupants of the house in 1944. Built in an elegant Georgian architectural style, it is categorized officially as a category B Listed Building and heritage structure.

== History ==
The Bruce family who came to Whalsay in the 17th century owned the entire island. They owned the island for nearly 300 years. They employed local people to carry out fishing operations for commercial purposes. This remains part of the island's folklore. Ghost stories are also narrated of this place, including that of an old sailor who was murdered for arguing with the gardener of the house during a game of cards.

The Bruce family took up the ambitious project of building Symbister House in 1823 in a grand Georgian architectural style with brown coloured granite stones chiseled into square blocks. They employed local labour for the construction, yet it cost the huge sum of £30,000, as they brought quarried granite stones from the tidal affected area of North Nesting. The house, which was the largest building complex on the island of the time, is also known as New Haa. Local stories mention that the landlord who built it did not want ownership to pass to his son, with whom he had strained relationship. This resulted in hard times for the Bruce family who inherited the property. Even to maintain it they had to take on boarders in the 1920s and 30s. The last of the lairds died here in 1944. The building then remained vacant for some years and was subject to deterioration. It was only in 1963 that the local council took possession of the building and refurbished part of the complex into a school. After renovation, the school opened in 1964 as the Whalsay Junior High School. It has been renovated in recent years by the council.

The New Haa as originally built, had courtyards, a writing room, outbuildings, stables, byres, a farmhouse, a grinding mill (run by a water wheel of 16 ft diameter), a dovecote and a "high-rise", three-seater toilet outside. The local history group has plans to develop these buildings into a museum and a heritage complex. Water supply to the complex was from a reservoir.
