= MV Snolda =

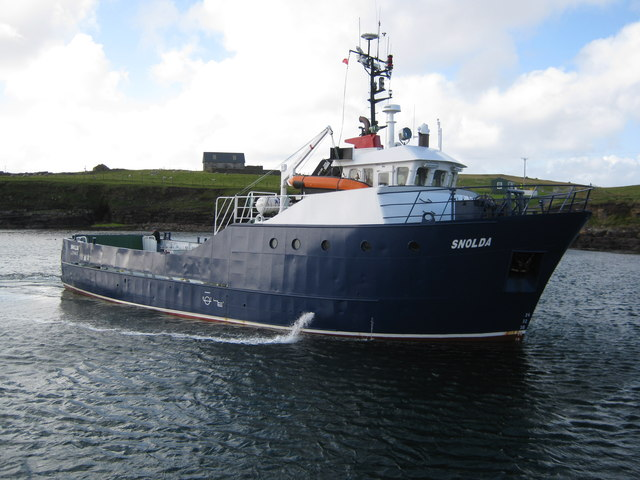
- MV Snolda arriving at Papa Stour pier

History

United Kingdom
- Name: Snolda (2003–present); Filla (1983–2003)
- Owner: Shetland Islands Council
- Operator: SIC Ferries
- Port of registry: Lerwick
- Route: Out Skerries (1983–2003); Papa Stour (2004–present)
- Builder: Sibbjorn Iversen, Flakkefjord, Norway
- Yard number: 49
- Launched: 1983
- Completed: 1983
- In service: 28 November 1983
- Identification: IMO number: 8302090
- Status: In service

General characteristics
- Type: Ro-ro vehicle and passenger ferry
- Tonnage: 130.6 GT; 49.56 NT; 150.6 DWT
- Displacement: 292.9
- Length: 24.4 m (80 ft 1 in)
- Beam: 7.0 m (23 ft 0 in)
- Draught: 3.362 m (11 ft 0.4 in)
- Depth: 3.8 m (12 ft 6 in)
- Ramps: Aft ramp
- Installed power: 1 × 445 kW (597 hp) at 1,350 rpm
- Propulsion: 1 × Volvo Penta D30A M5
- Speed: 9 knots (17 km/h; 10 mph)
- Boats & landing craft carried: 1 × rescue boat
- Capacity: 20 passengers (summer); 12 passengers (winter); 6 cars; 1 Artic
- Crew: 4

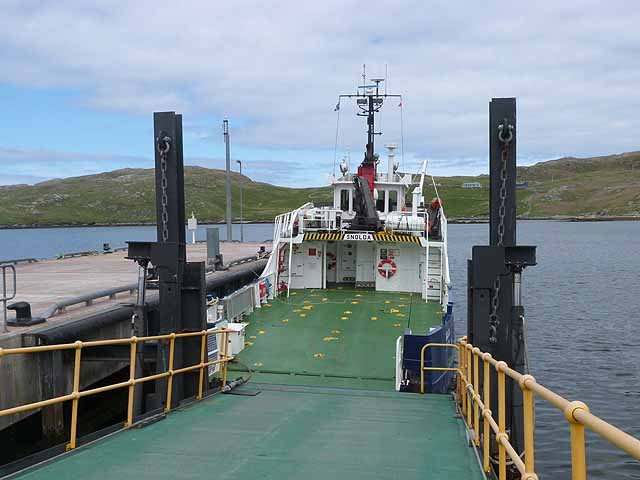
Snolda alongside in West Burrafirth

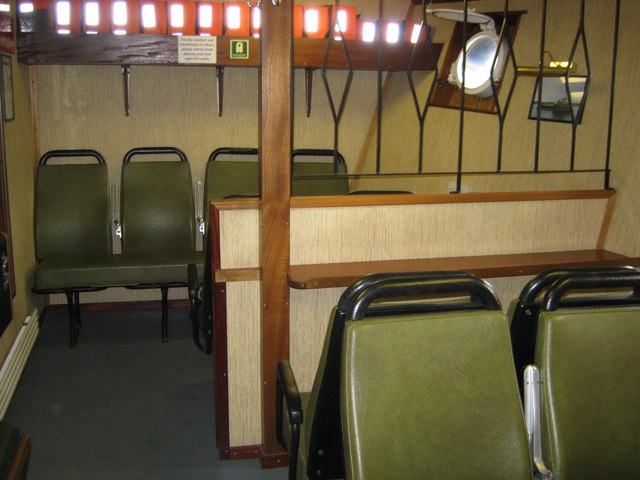
Snolda's passenger lounge

MV Snolda is a ro-ro passenger ferry operated by the SIC Ferries. She operates as the West Burrafirth to Papa Stour service. The ship was originally named MV Filla until 2003.

== History ==
Filla was bought as the second of the second batch of new builds for the Council since they took over the inter-island ferry services in the early 1970s. She was renamed to Snolda when transferred from the Out Skerries route to the Papa Stour route to make way for the new MV Filla (2003). This new ferry was based on the original Filla's design but larger, with cargo tanks and refrigerated units and diesel electric driven propulsion.

== Layout ==
The Snolda has a stern loading only car deck, which, in the SIC fleet, is only on her and her successor, Filla. She has a small passenger lounge forward of the car deck.

== Service ==
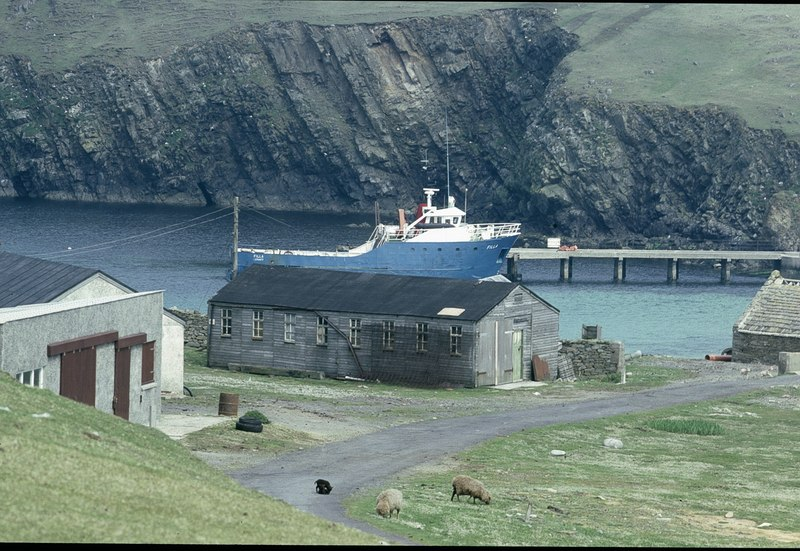
As Filla off Fair Isle in June 1986

Entering service on 28 November 1983 on the Symbister or Vidlin or Lerwick to Out Skerries service, Filla took over from the old renovated fishing vessel MV Spes Clara. She became the spare and additional cargo duties vessel. Filla continued on this route until replaced by the new Filla in October 2003.

After being renamed Snolda, she was refitted ready to take up service on the Papa Stour service in April 2004, replacing MV Koada, the old MV Good Shepherd III. However, ro-ro service to Papa Stour did not start until 17 September 2005. She continues to serve this route today.

Snolda has carried out the occasional cargo sailing to Foula and Fair Isle out with her scheduled sailings.
