= Monan (saint) =

Saint Monan (fl. 6th century) was a Christian missionary in Fife, probably a Gael. Little is known of him. Monan is believed to have lived at a monastery at Pittenweem before leaving to take up residence in a small cave near the site of the present St Monans Church.

The only description of his life comes from the Brevarium Aberdonense, which was published in Edinburgh in 1509–1510. This account has numerous demonstrable errors, but it claims that St. Monan was a companion of Saint Adrian, who was with him on the Isle of May when he suffered martyrdom, and then went on to Inverey in Fife and set up a chapel. This chapel was rebuilt by David II of Scotland between 1329 and 1371, after he recovered from battle wounds thanks to the intercession of the saint. This place is the modern-day St Monans in Fife, Scotland.

Alban Butler follows the Aberdeen Breviary, making Monan a colleague of Adrian, and surviving the Viking attack in 874, only to be killed at Inverey. Still other accounts have him martyred with Adrian on May.

William Forbes Skene rejects the account in the Aberdeen Breviary, and suggests that Monan is no other than the Bishop of Clonfert, Moinenn. Due to the devastation wrought by the Dane Thorgest, many Scots clerics left Ireland to find refuge with Kenneth MacAlpin, bringing Monan's relics with them. Skene further notes that they share the same feast day, 1 March.

There was a chapel of the Culdees, dedicated to St. Monan at Portmoak, sometime before the mid-11th century. The name derives from the Port of St Moak (an alternative name for St Monan), being a port on Loch Leven.

== Sources ==
- Macquarrie, Alan. "Monan" in Matthew, H.C.G. and Brian Harrison, eds. The Oxford Dictionary of National Biography. vol. 38, 574–575. London: OUP, 2004
