= Whalsay Airstrip =

Airport in Shetland Islands, Scotland

Coordinates: 60.376648°N 0.927356°W

Whalsay Airstrip is located at the village of Skaw in the northern end of the island of Whalsay, Shetland, Scotland. It is the only airfield serving the island and is available for charter flights. The landing surface, which is 18 metres (59 ft) wide and 457 metres (1,499 ft) long, is constructed from rolled gravel.
