= Burrafirth =

Coordinates: 60.80251°N 0.87981°W

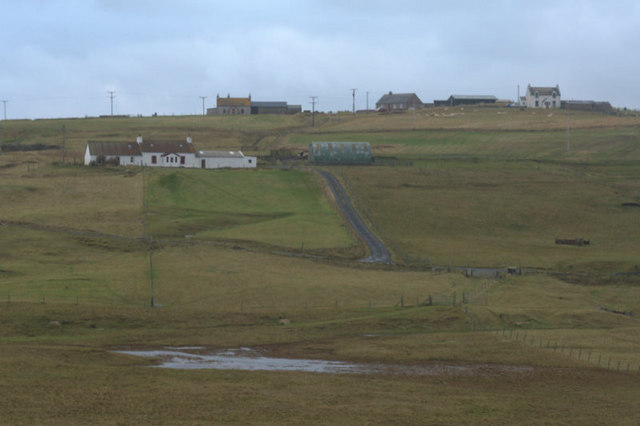
- Burrafirth links

- Location within Shetland
- OS grid reference: HP610133
- Civil parish: Unst
- Council area: Shetland
- Lieutenancy area: Shetland
- Country: Scotland
- Sovereign state: United Kingdom
- Post town: SHETLAND
- Postcode district: ZE2
- Dialling code: 01957
- Police: Scotland
- Fire: Scottish
- Ambulance: Scottish
- UK Parliament: Orkney and Shetland
- Scottish Parliament: Shetland

Burrafirth (Shaetlan pronunciation: [ˈbɔrəfɪrt] BURR-ə-firrt, Old Norse: Borgarfjorðr, meaning "the fjord with a castle") is a settlement on the island of Unst, Shetland, Scotland. It separates the fjord Burra Firth from the Loch of Cliff.

Burrafirth is said to have once been home to a giant called Saxi, who, together with another giant, was lured away by a mermaid.
