= Filla =

Filla (Czech feminine: Fillová) is a Czech and Spanish surname. In Czech, it was derived from the given name Filip. Notable people with the surname include:

- Emil Filla (1882–1953), Czech painter
- Marcelo Filla (born 1998), Chilean footballer
- Michal Filla (born 1981), Czech motorcycle racer

== See also ==
- Polyfilla
