= Laxo =

Coordinates: 60.354°N 1.197°W

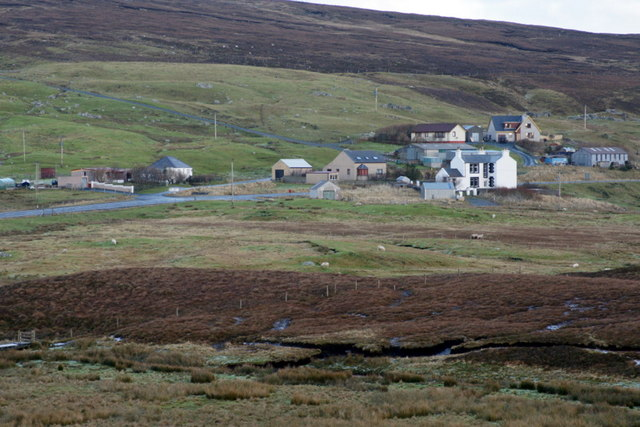
- Laxo

- Location within Shetland
- OS grid reference: HU443635
- Civil parish: Nesting
- Council area: Shetland
- Lieutenancy area: Shetland
- Country: Scotland
- Sovereign state: United Kingdom
- Post town: SHETLAND
- Postcode district: ZE2
- Dialling code: 01595
- Police: Scotland
- Fire: Scottish
- Ambulance: Scottish
- UK Parliament: Orkney and Shetland
- Scottish Parliament: Shetland

Laxo (Shaetlan pronunciation: [ˈlakso] LAKS-o) is a small settlement at the end of Laxo Voe in Vidlin, Shetland, Scotland.

A ferry from the Mainland to Symbister in Whalsay operates from the nearby Laxo Ferry Terminal, and is operated by the Shetland Islands Council. North of Laxo is the Hill of Laxowater and a 1 km long loch called Laxo Water which is an excellent trout fishing location.

Laxo Cottage, a distinctive white house with black corner stones, used to be the water bailiff's house.
