= Symbister =

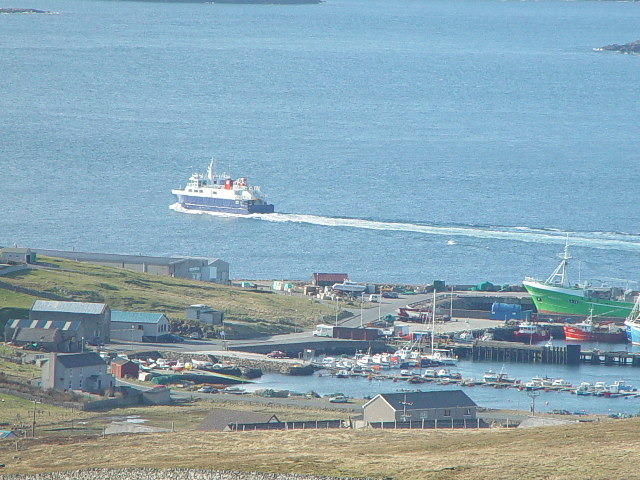
- Symbister Harbour, viewed from Ward of Clate

- Location within Shetland
- Population: 797
- OS grid reference: HU539622
- Civil parish: Nesting
- Council area: Shetland
- Lieutenancy area: Shetland
- Country: Scotland
- Sovereign state: United Kingdom
- Post town: SHETLAND
- Postcode district: ZE2
- Dialling code: 01806
- Police: Scotland
- Fire: Scottish
- Ambulance: Scottish
- UK Parliament: Orkney and Shetland
- Scottish Parliament: Shetland
- Symbister Ness Lighthouse
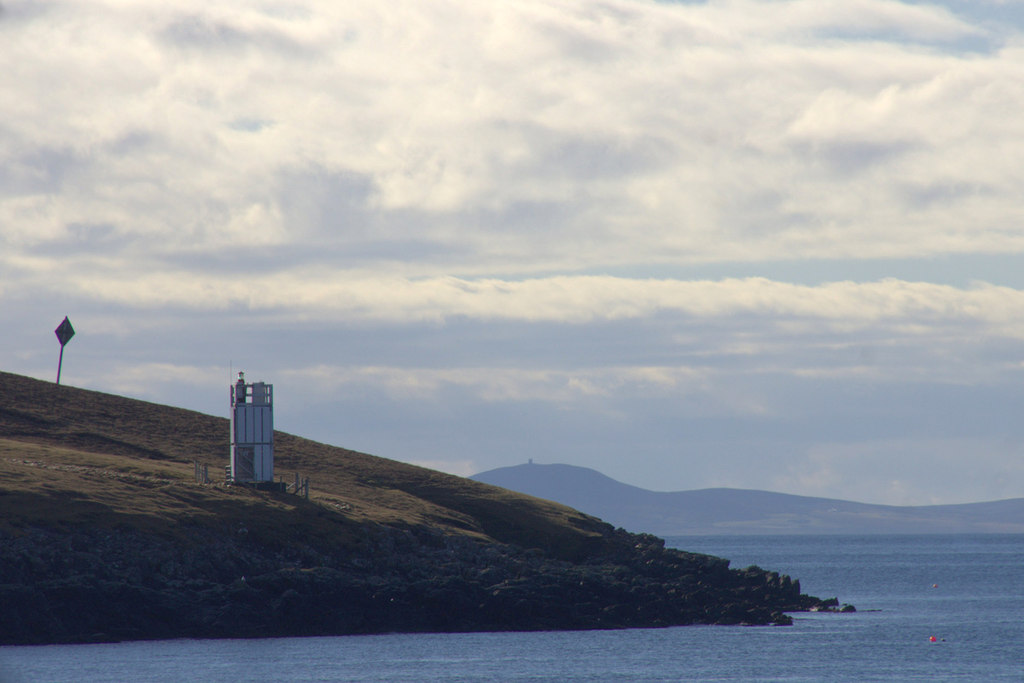
- Coordinates: 60.340482°N 1.038066°W
- Constructed: 1904 (first)
- Foundation: concrete basement
- Construction: metal skeletal tower (current) cast iron tower (first)
- Height: 7 metres (23 ft)
- Shape: quadrangular tower covered by aluminium panels with light on the top (current) octagonal prism tower with balcony and lantern
- Markings: white tower
- Power source: solar power
- Operator: Northern Lighthouse Board
- First lit: 2000s
- Focal height: 11 metres (36 ft)
- Range: white: 8 nautical miles (15 km; 9.2 mi) green: 6 nautical miles (11 km; 6.9 mi)
- Characteristic: Fl (2) WG 12s.

Symbister (Shaetlan pronunciation: [ˈsɪmbistər] SIM-bee-stər) is the largest village and port on Whalsay, an island in the Shetland archipelago of Scotland. The population in 1991 was 797. The focus of the village is the harbour, which is home to small fishing boats as well as large deep sea trawlers. The village is overlooked by the granite mansion Symbister House, built by the Sixth Robert Bruce of Symbister in 1823. The harbour is also known by the names Bay Of Symbister, Symbister Harbour and Symbister Old Harbour.

The Pier House, now a museum, was once the centre for the export of dried and salted fish to the Hanseatic League, an alliance of trading guilds that established and maintained a trade monopoly over much of Northern Europe between the 13th and 17th centuries.

== History ==
The island has been inhabited for more than 4000 years as witnessed by the Neolithic houses of Yoxie and Benie. An Iron Age block house to the northeast overlooks the Loch of Huxter. In the 14th century, the Huxters took over the island and held it until they went bankrupt in the 1830s. Germans also sailed to Symbister for trading and brought their goods, iron tools, seeds, salt and cloth to barter for dried and salted fish from the island. The old Hanseatic house which had been used by the Germans for several centuries until 1707, was refurbished into the museum.

William Bruce of Symbister, who had migrated from Fife to Symbister, was a deputy to Laurence Bruce of Cultamalindie. In 1571, he was the Great Foude of Shetland, under Lord Robert Stewart. He married Marjorie Stewart, a daughter of John Stewart, Commendator of Coldingham. After his retirement, he moved back to his home country but he left his properties at Symbister to his eldest son and Fife to a son by his second wife. William Bruce, his grandson, the third in the lineage left his properties to a son by his second wife. The family lived in Symbister until recently and had considerable power on the island.

Tobset Bruce built the Symbister House at a cost of more than £30,000 using granite in 1823. In the 1850s, Robert Bruce of Symbister leased part of his estate to Robert Mouatvery, a merchant who ill‑treated his tenants and exploited the four estates. Symbister estate's fishing tenure under his lease was still run in a primitive form even in the 1860s, as William Stewart testified before a Royal Commission in 1872.

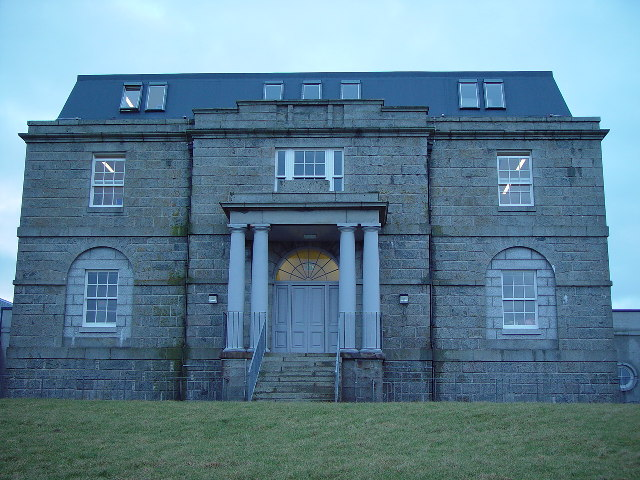
Symbister House

The last resident of the Symbister House died in 1944. Since the 1960s, Symbister House has been used as Whalsay Junior High School, providing education to students of age 4–16. The land around the Symbister House has an old wooden boat sculpture. Ghost stories are also narrated about this place, including that of an old sailor who was murdered for arguing with the gardener of the house during a game of cards.

== Facilities and economy ==
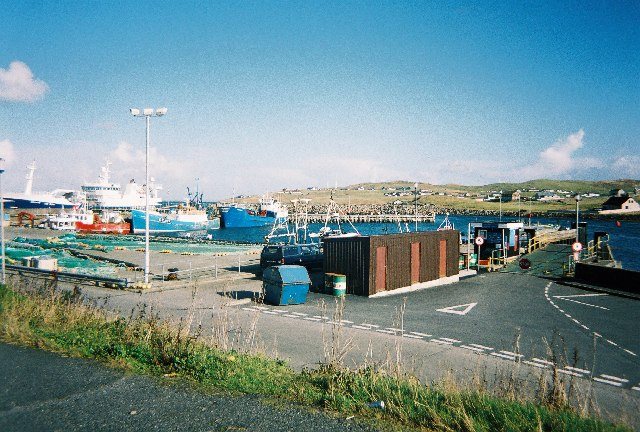
Symbister harbour and ferry terminal

Symbister is a sheltered harbour and is busy with small fishing boats and recreational craft plying alongside large ocean-going trawlers. The marina here is a seventy-berth facility and also accommodates ferries travelling between the islands. A ferry to Laxo on the Shetland mainland operates from Symbister. Apart from ferry services, Symbister is also accessible by road from Whalsay airstrip, located in the island at its northeastern end at Skaw.

As a village, Symbister has infrastructure facilities and basic amenities such as a post-office, many shops, a community hall, police station and a medical hospital with surgical facilities. Whalsay Leisure Centre, Grieve House camping Böd and Harbison Park, home of Whalsay Football Club, are also of note. Symbister Harbour is now a modern harbour with a large fleet of fishing craft which have contributed to the economic progress of the island and making it one of the most prosperous in the region. Whalsay Boating and Sports Club is based at the harbour.

Fishing has been the mainstay of the island of Whalsay and its harbour housed the fishing community. During the earlier centuries herring was the main fishing focus with catches peaking in 1834. However, this industry suffered due to drastic decline of yield within a few years. Fishing picked up again in the late 1800s and in the mid-1900s.

== Aquatic fauna ==
Sea mammals such as porpoise, dolphin, minke whale, and orca can be seen from the rocks offshore over the harbour. Many migrants birds, like wheatear, meadow pipit, snow bunting and buff breasted sandpiper have been sighted.

== See also ==
- List of lighthouses in Scotland
- List of Northern Lighthouse Board lighthouses
