= Grutness =

Coordinates: 59.873°N 1.279°W

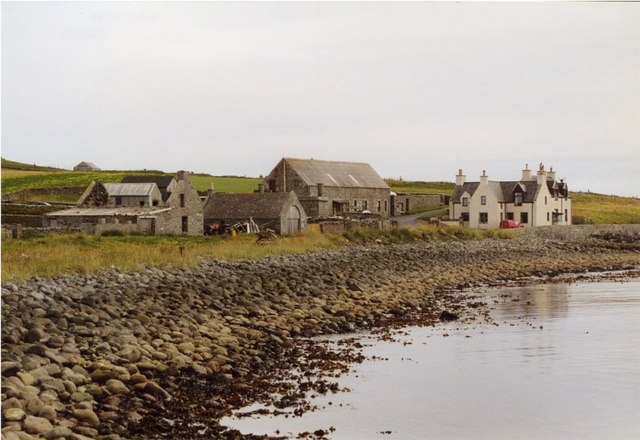
- Grutness from the Fair Isle ferry jetty

- Location within Shetland
- OS grid reference: HU403099
- Civil parish: Dunrossness
- Council area: Shetland
- Lieutenancy area: Shetland
- Country: Scotland
- Sovereign state: United Kingdom
- Post town: SHETLAND
- Postcode district: ZE3
- Dialling code: 01950
- Police: Scotland
- Fire: Scottish
- Ambulance: Scottish
- UK Parliament: Orkney and Shetland
- Scottish Parliament: Shetland

Grutness is a small settlement and headland at the southern tip of the main island of the Shetland Islands, Scotland. The settlement is within the parish of Dunrossness. It is located close to Sumburgh Head and is the terminus of the ferry service between the Shetland Mainland and Fair Isle. It has a pebbly beach and seals, whales and orcas can be seen in the sea nearby.

== In popular culture ==
In Douglas Adams' and John Lloyd's spoof dictionary The Deeper Meaning of Liff wherein place names are given comical definitions, Grutness is defined as 'The resolve with which the queen sits through five days of Polynesian folk dancing'
