= St Monans =

Coordinates: 56.206036°N 2.766582°W

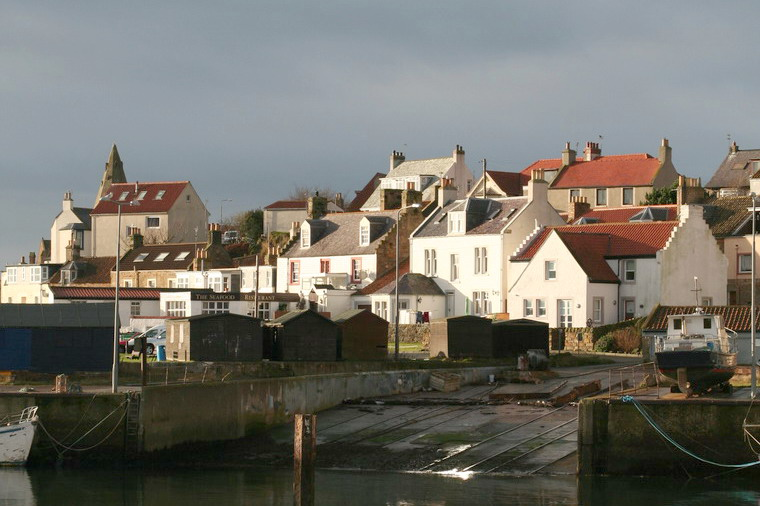
- St Monans (west end of harbour)

- Location within Fife
- Population: 1,130 (2020)
- OS grid reference: NO524017
- Council area: Fife
- Lieutenancy area: Fife
- Country: Scotland
- Sovereign state: United Kingdom
- Post town: Anstruther
- Postcode district: KY10
- Dialling code: 01333
- Police: Scotland
- Fire: Scottish
- Ambulance: Scottish
- UK Parliament: North East Fife
- Scottish Parliament: North East Fife

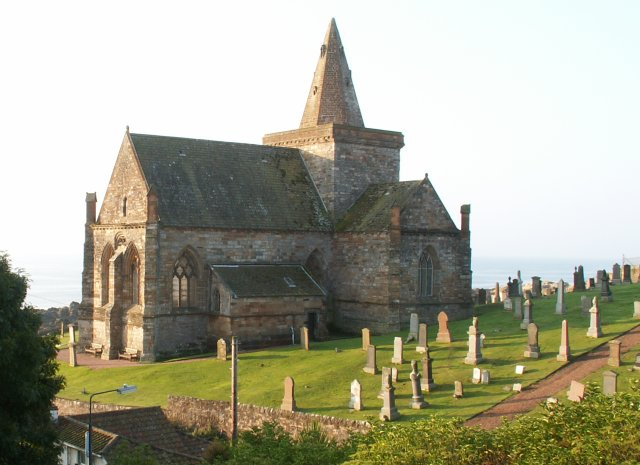
St Monans Church

St Monans (/ˈmoʊnənz/, locally /ˈsɪmənənz/), sometimes spelt St Monance, is a village and parish in the East Neuk of Fife and is named after the legendary Saint Monan.

Situated approximately three miles (five kilometres) west of Anstruther, the small community, whose inhabitants used to make their living mainly from fishing, is now a tourist destination situated on the Fife Coastal Path. The former burgh rests on a hill overlooking the Firth of Forth, with views to North Berwick, the Bass Rock and the Isle of May. Like other East Neuk villages, it is rich in vernacular fisher and merchant houses of the 17th to early 19th centuries, with characteristic old Scots features such as forestairs, crow-stepped gables, datestones and pantiled roofs. Its historic buildings include a now defunct windmill that once powered a salt panning industry, and a 14th-century church that sits on the rocks above the water on the western side.

Approximately 1/2 mile (800 metres) west of St Monans are the remains of Newark Castle, a 16th-century manor that has since fallen to ruin through cliff erosion and disrepair. In 2002, with the permission of Historic Scotland, an unsuccessful attempt to restore the castle was made.

The civil parish had a population of 1,357 in 2011; the population at the 2021 Census was 1,120.

== History ==
The village takes its name from St Monan, who was killed by invading Danes in about 875. St Adrian was killed on the Isle of May in the same raid, and 6,000 Fife Christians are said to have died.

According to author Leonard Low, an account written for Mary Queen of Scots indicates that in 1548 a significant battle occurred a short distance from St Monans church. The Scottish army, pulling away from losses in Musselburgh and Edinburgh, turned to fight, and defeat, the invading English army at St Monans. All other written records of this battle appear to have been lost when Oliver Cromwell ordered all Scottish records be shipped to the Tower of London, and several barrels filled with documents were lost at sea en route.

== Harbour ==
As with many of the East Neuk villages the harbour began as a simple natural inlet protected by natural rock outcrops. The first structures were the slipways for launching small boats. The first mention of a manmade harbour is in 1649 (west of the existing harbour). The east pier dates from 1865 and was designed by David Stevenson and Thomas Stevenson. The west pier was created in 1902 by their nephew Charles Alexander Stevenson who also deepened the harbour to take larger vessels. Plans for various stages in the Stevenson's development of the harbour are available on the National Library of Scotland website.In 1883 the Fishery Board reported how the fishermen had erected a good harbour at a cost to themselves of about £15,000, and how the Board had provided some assistance to carry out further works. A comparison of the First and Second Editions of the Six-Inch Ordnance Survey Map of St. Monance clearly shows how the harbour and the town developed.

=== Fishing ===
While the catch fluctuated from year to year, the following statistics show that in the years prior to the First World War fishing from St Monans was successful.

Fishery Statistics

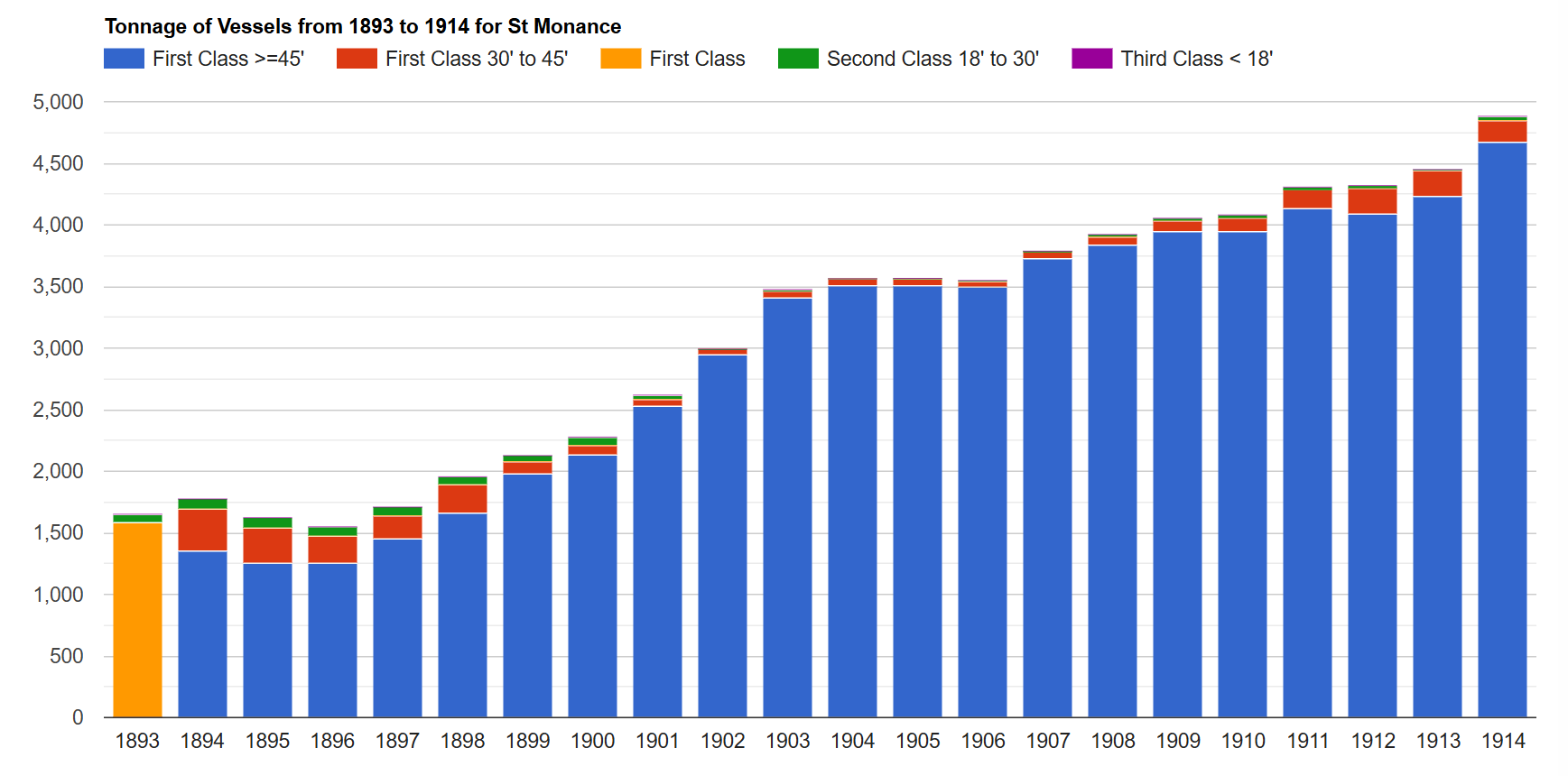
Tonnage of vessels

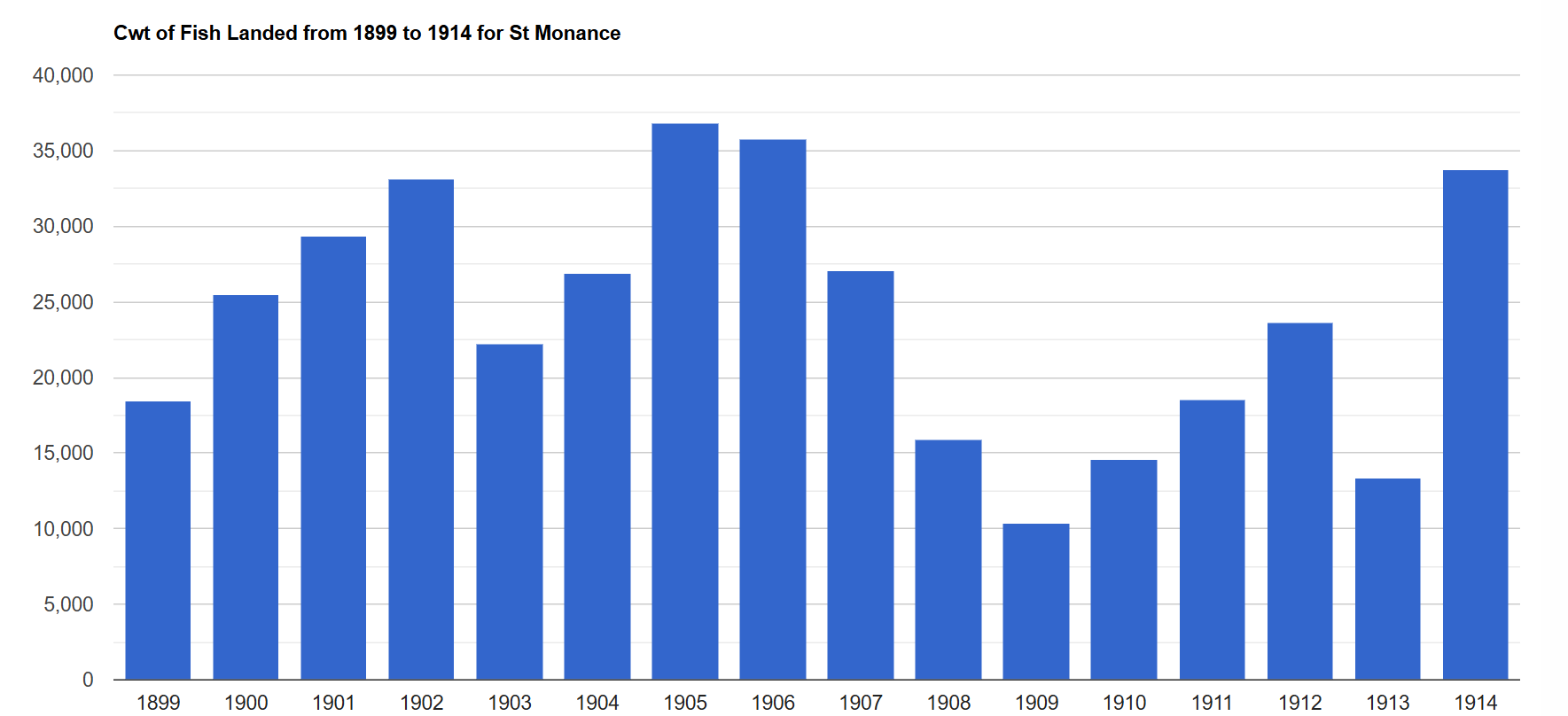
Cwt of fish landed

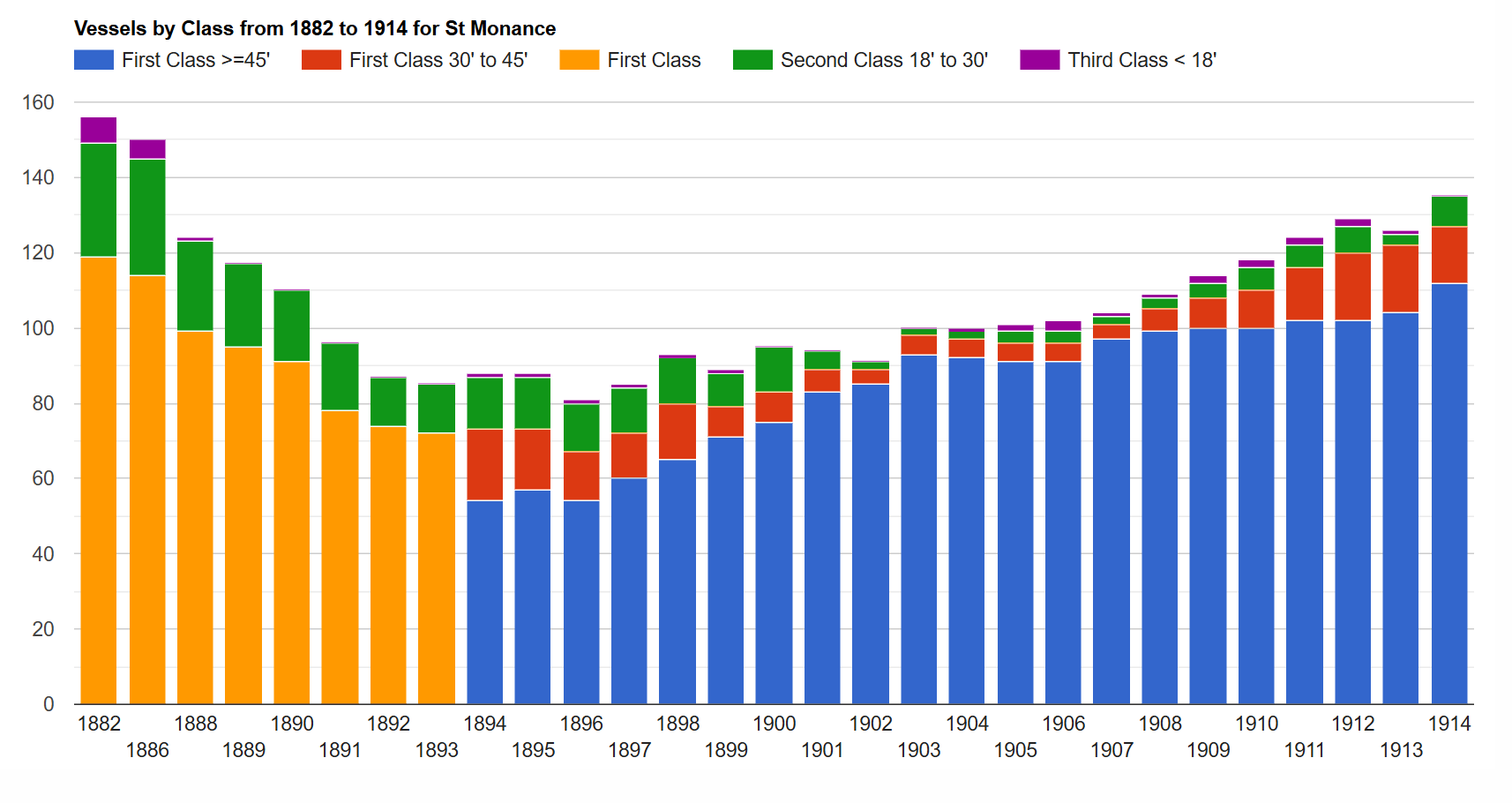
Vessels by class

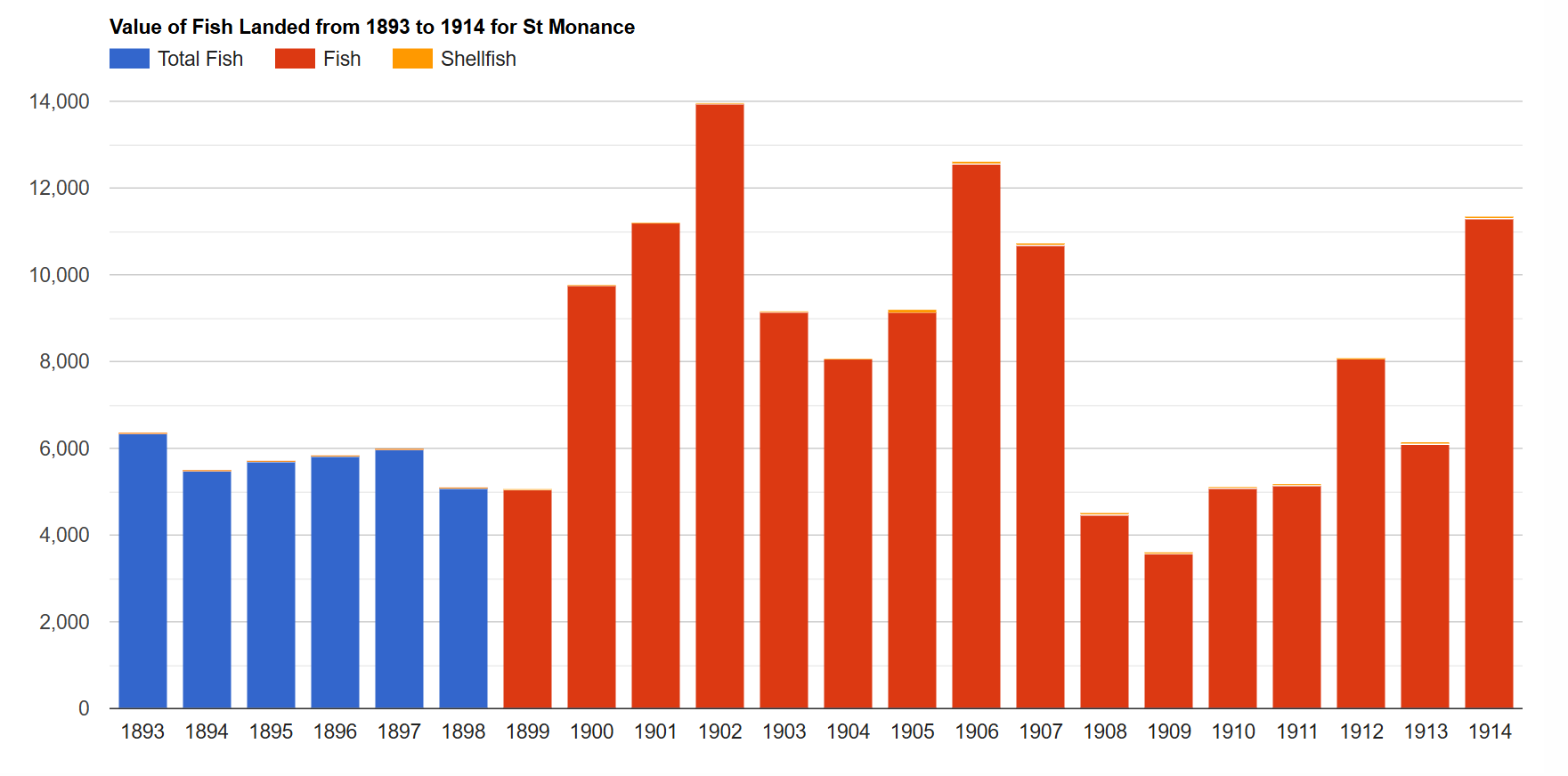
Value (£] of fish landed

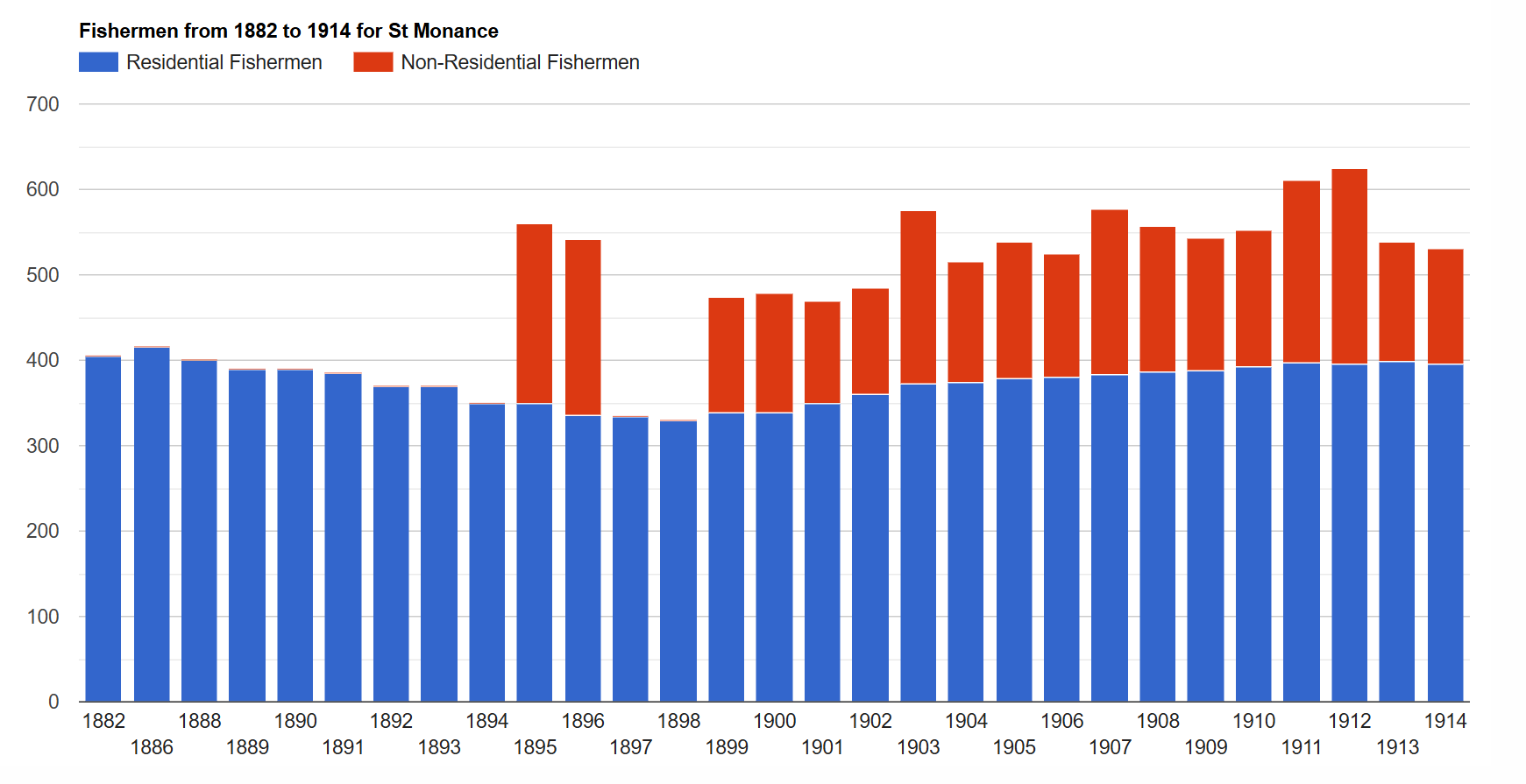
Fishermen

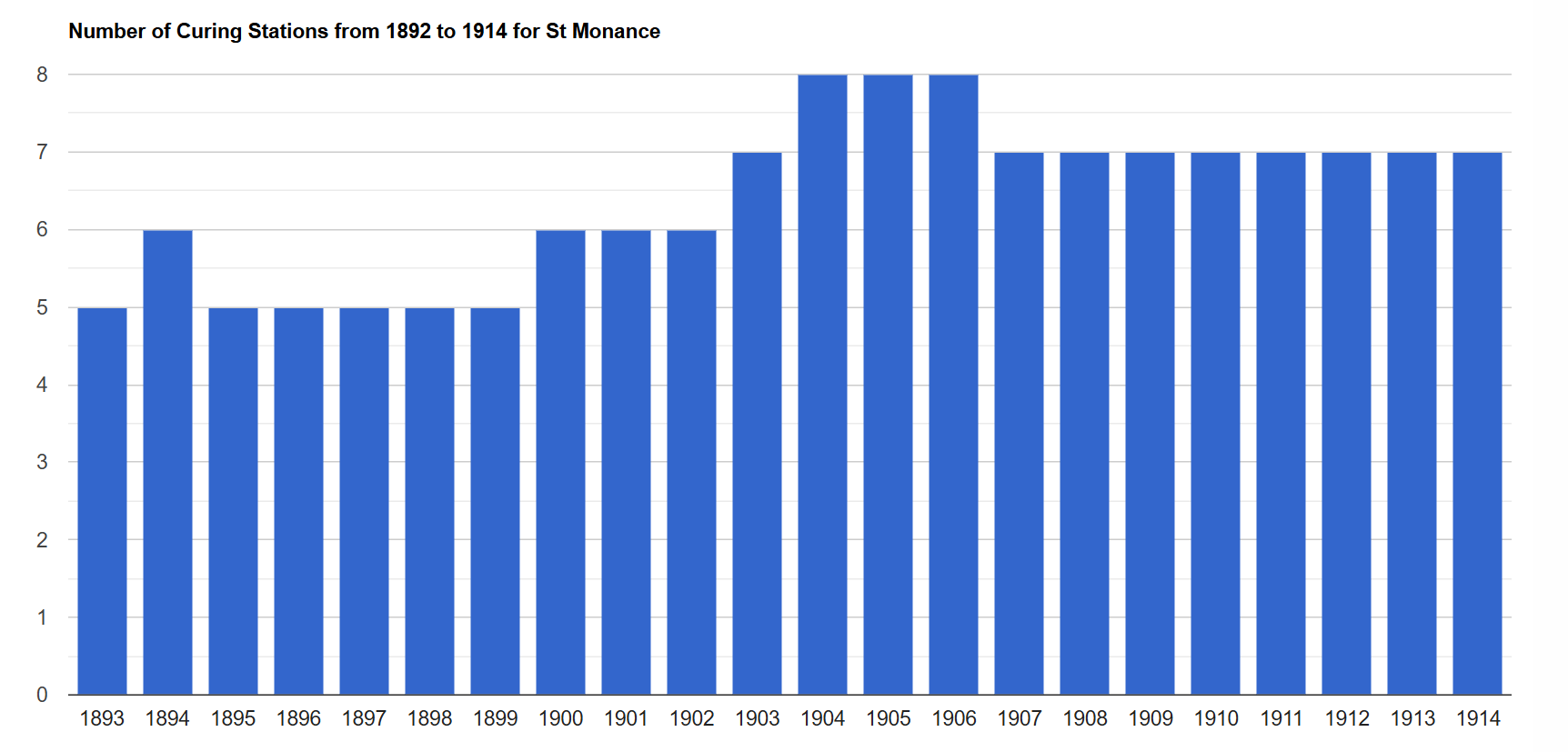
Number of curing stations

== Parish church ==
St Monans Church dates from 1369 and is situated in an isolated position to the west of the village on the very edge of the sea. It is perched on a low rock, over a small valley with a burn. As seen from most directions it has the sea as a backdrop. The original graveyard surrounds the church and a more modern cemetery stands further westwards on the upper slopes of the little hill. This contains the local war memorial. Standing at the extreme west end of this the ruin of an earlier church can be viewed across fields, again perched on the sea edge.

It is often said that, in the whole of Scotland, St Monans Church is the church nearest the sea, and this may well be the case, being only around 20 m from the edge. The church, one of the finest remaining from the Middle Ages in Scotland, was built by King David II Bruce (1329–71), initially for a small house of Dominican friars. It later became the Church of Scotland parish church. Though the church may never have been finished (it has a choir and transepts, with a short spire over the crossing, but lacks a nave), it has many features of architectural interest, notably the fine stone vaulting in the choir and the plain but handsome sedilia. White-washed throughout internally, the church is particularly light and attractive among ancient Scottish churches.

The church was greatly restored in 1899 by the Glasgow architect Peter MacGregor Chalmers. The church hall was added in 1913 to a design by Sir Robert Lorimer.

Major restoration to the windows and masonry was completed in March 2007. The church is open to visitors daily from April to October.

The church and churchyard feature in a number of films including the 2016 remake of Whisky Galore! and the funeral, wedding and pier scenes in The Railway Man. It was also used in the 1981 Johnny Cash Christmas Special.

The Church entered into the category of Guardianship in the early 2020's. However, the Church was due to close as a formal place of worship by the end of 2025. The Service of Closure, which celebrates the life and witness of St Monans Church took place on 19 October 2025 at the morning service.

== St. Monans Gospel Hall ==
The Hall was built in 1970 and is a modern building, harled with a slate roof, situated in a raised location facing broadly west over Hope Park on the northern edge of St. Monans. Prior to its construction, it was not uncommon for fishermen from St Monans to cycle to St Andrews to attend meetings at the Gospel Hall there.

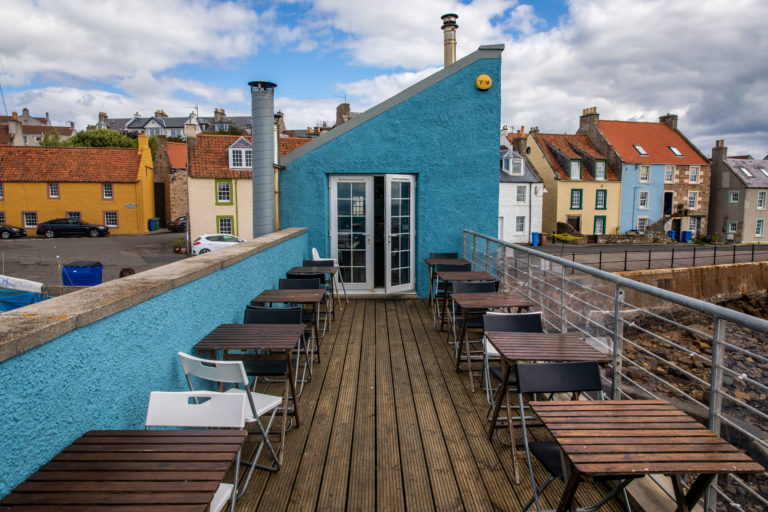
Buildings in St. Monans, typical of the East Neuk

== Shops, hotels, cafés and businesses ==
St Monans has a fish merchants and a fish-smokehouse. The village has several restaurants and cafes and many privately owned holiday homes. There is also a caravan park which attracts many visitors, a tradition that has continued from when the village was on the East Neuk Rail Line, part of the Fife Coast Railway which was shut down in the 1960s after the Beeching cuts.

St. Monance railway station (spelt St. Monans from 1875 to 1936) was at the entrance to the village, where there is now an industrial estate. All that remains is the south platform, which is overgrown with grass, and the station master's house, now a private residence.

Salt production by evaporation was a traditional industry in the East Neuk. The East Neuk Salt Company has revived this industry in St Monans.

For over 200 years the boat builder J W Miller & Sons Ltd produced fifie fishing boats, yachts and motor launches in St Monans. There is no longer boat building in the village.

== In popular culture ==
In 2026, Glasgow-based development studio Screen Burn announced that their upcoming video game Silent Hill: Townfall is set in fictional Scottish coastal town 'St. Amelia', which they revealed is based upon St Monans. They explained that they toured the village for inspiration, and directly based many of St. Amelia's locations on real places in St Monans.

== Bus services ==
The two main bus services that run through St Monans are operated by Stagecoach South Scotland. These are:

- 95 from Leven to St Andrews via Anstruther and Crail
- X61 from Edinburgh to St Andrews via Kirkcaldy, Leven

== Notable residents ==
- Charlie Cooke, professional footballer
- Christopher Rush, author; his autobiography Hellfire and Herring describes the community as he knew it as a boy and as described by his grandfather and other relatives.
