= James N Miller & Sons =

Scottish boatbuilder

J W Miller & Sons Ltd
- Type: Private
- Industry: Boat building
- Founded: incorporated 1929
- Fate: Closed
- Headquarters: St Monans, Fife, Scotland

J W Miller & Sons Ltd was a boatbuilder in St Monans, Fife, Scotland for over 200 years. They produced a variety of fishing boats, yachts and motor launches. The firm built 110 Fifie yachts and was known worldwide for the quality and craftsmanship of their vessels. The yard is now closed.

== History ==
The firm of James N. Miller & Sons was established in 1747, by John Miller, wheelwright and joiner of Over Kellie. Up to 1888, the firm built fishing boats for St Monans, Pittenweem and Anstruther. As well as being boat builders, the firm were the local joiners and undertakers, making the coffins themselves.

James Thomson Niven Miller opened a second yard in Anstruther, where he was able to build larger Fifie fishing boats, and steam trawlers and drifters, fitted with compound steam engines. He diversified into building cargo boats, launches, fishery inspection vessels and yachts. Later, he was a pioneer for the marine internal combustion engine, installing a diesel two-stroke engine in a 62 ft Fifie fishing boat. In 1908 he fitted a four-cylinder Kelvin paraffin engine in a 40 ft yacht and became an agent for Kelvin engines, an agency which lasted for the lifetime of the business.

Miller's played their part in the two world wars, building motor launches for the Royal Navy for use in the Near East during World War I. Between the wars, while still producing fishing boats, yacht building came into its own. From 1920 to 1939, 66 yachts were built, many to Miller's own design. Others were designed by naval architects including G L Watson and W G McBryde. A total of 59 vessels, motor torpedo boats and motor launches were built during and immediately after World War II. Post-war, a number of new fishing fleets and several large luxury yachts were built. In 1957, James's grandson, Jimmy, designed the Fifie yachts, on fishing boat lines. The first, a 31 footer Royle Fifer, was taken to the 1958 Boat Show at Olympia and was sold on preview day. Up to 1969, 110 Fifer yachts were built, the largest being 45 feet, with several making Round the World trips.

Miller's remained a family business, passing through several generations. The firm was known worldwide for the quality and craftsmanship of their vessels. In 1934, brothers Tom and Willie took over the business. Their father, James, continued to run the ship chandlers - grocery store until his death in 1944. Willie designed and patented a motor driven capstan that was named 'Fifer'. It was assembled in an enlarged engineer's shop, previously used to build smaller boats. Tom's son, Jimmy, served time in the boatyard, studied naval architecture, and designed many of the fishing boats built. Willie's son, Jim, like his father before him, went to Bergius in Glasgow to serve time as an engineer. However, he made his name as the Scottish and classical singer, Niven Miller and did not pursue a career in the boatyard. After Tom's death, Jimmy took his father's place in the business, with his youngest sister, Jessie working in the office. The business continued to flourish.

With the introduction of steam and motor power, fishing gear became more complex. An advertising pamphlet from 1967 has a list of the gear that Miller's made, including net winches, trawl winches and rope coilers. Willie retired to New Zealand, leaving Jimmy and Jessie to carry on, but with no sons, it was the end of the Miller line. In 1972, Jimmy constructed a steel-hulled fishing boat for George Moodie of Port Seton. James McBurney of McTay Marine built the hull and Millers fitted the engine and steering gear and completed fitting out at St Monans. This was followed by the Ocean Herald for John McBain of Pittenweem, Ocean Triumph a 76 footer, for Ian Murray of Anstruther and another 76 footer for Robert Clark of North Berwick.

In 1976, the company was taken over by McTay Marine, a member of the Mowlem group. Jimmy and Jessie continued to manage it for a while, but after Jimmy retired, things began to change. McTay switched to the construction of steel-hulled fishing boats. The yard closed in 1992 after the launch of the second of two small ferries for Caledonian MacBrayne. The shed remained derelict until demolished in late 2009, having been damaged by a storm the year before.

== Boats built ==
The first yacht was steam driven with a clipper bow and an overhanging stern.

Yard No	Name	Type	Launch	Notes
	Boy Andrew	Fishing vessel	1958	
1041	Kebister		1990	For Lerwick Port Authority
1045	MV Loch Buie	Loch class ferry	1992	For Caledonian MacBrayne
1046	MV Loch Tarbert	Loch class ferry	1992	For Caledonian MacBrayne
	Bruce's	motor Fifie	1926	For Bruce family of Arbroath
	Halcyone	Sailing yacht	1934	Still sailing in Antwerp/Belgium https://www.nationalhistoricships.org.uk/register/2638/halcyone
	"Tresca"	Sailing yacht	1937	wood made. . Still sailing 2014
	Shianne	yacht	1938	ex-Bethamar. Still sailing on the Thames
	Kalistra	yacht	1939	wood made. . Still sailing Liverpool 2021
	Bluebird	motor yacht	1932	For Sir Malcolm Campbell; now Chico
	Crystal W		1956	
	Lassiette	Sailing Yacht	1947	Robert Clark design - plans held at National Maritime Museum - Keel Laid 1939 - Presently undergoing restoration on the Medway
	Johan	Fishing vessel	1949	
	Largo Law	Pilot vessel	1924	
	Memphis	Ketch	1928	For A E Holder of Totnes
	MV Guide	Passenger/survey vessel	1954	
	Nostaw		1957	
	Seacraig	Pilot vessel	1952	
	Shon Mora		1956	
	Fortune II	Fishing vessel	1958	
	Sunbeam		1959	
	Wild Venture	Motor sailor	1964	For E E Marsh of Marsh & Baxter
	Ëlsandra	33' Miller Fifer Ketch	1960	For Lt. Col C.P. Rigby, T.D., J.P of Whitby; now Thistle, ex Tafna
Source: National Historic Register, Lloyd's Register of Yachts (1973)
