= Whalsay =

Island of the Shetland Islands, Scotland

Location

- Whalsay shown within the Shetland Islands
- OS grid reference: HU560638
- Coordinates: 60.3333°N 0.983333°W

Name
- Name meaning: whale island
- Old Norse name: Hvalsøy

Physical geography
- Island group: Shetland
- Area: 1,970 hectares (7.6 sq mi)
- Area rank: 36
- Highest elevation: Ward of Clett 119 metres (390 ft)

Administration
- Council area: Shetland Islands
- Country: Scotland
- Sovereign state: United Kingdom

Demographics
- Population: 1,005
- Population rank: 14
- Population density: 51 people/km^{2}
- Largest settlement: Symbister

Whalsay (Shaetlan pronunciation: ['hwaɫzə] WHALZ-ə; Old Norse: Hvalsey or Hvals-øy, meaning 'Whale Island') is the sixth largest in area ·of the Shetland Islands in the north of Scotland.

== Geography ==
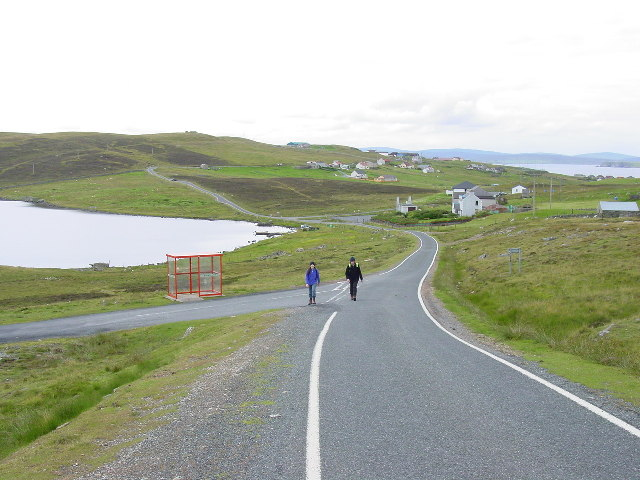
Road between Symbister and Isbister

Whalsay, also known as "The Bonnie Isle", is a peat-covered island in the Shetland Islands. It is situated east of the Shetland Mainland and has an area of 7.6 square miles (20 km^{2}). The main settlement is Symbister, where the fishing fleet is based. The fleet is composed of both pelagic and demersal vessels. Other main settlements include Clate, Isbister, Sandwick, Saltness, Huxter, Challister, Marrister, North Park and furthest north is Skaw.

The island is fertile and fairly densely populated, with crofting taking second place to fishing as the main local industries.

== Transport ==
Ferries sail from Symbister to Laxo and Vidlin on the Shetland Mainland. When normal service is in operation two ferries run a tandem service between Symbister and Laxo. Departure times from the two terminals are normally around every 35 minutes according to a timetable, with the crossing taking approximately 30 minutes. The two ferries currently in service are the Hendra and the Linga. The Vidlin terminal is used when the weather causes the crossing to Laxo to become too rough. The journey between Symbister and Laxo takes around 30 minutes, but can take slightly longer depending on the weather and tides.

The island also has an airstrip, Whalsay Airstrip, at Skaw which is used only for emergencies.

== Recreation ==
Skaw is home to the most northerly 18 hole golf course in the UK. There is a club house with adequate parking. Other sporting facilities on the isle are the Whalsay Leisure Centre, a snooker club and Harbison Park artificial sports field.

Sailing dinghies and Shetland model boats are popular, with an annual Whalsay Regatta, usually taking place in the last week of July. In recent times, the popularity of sailing has declined, with the number of participating boats decreasing with each passing year.

Whalsay has an amateur football club, as well as hockey and netball teams. These teams participate in Shetland leagues. Whalsay F.C.'s home ground is Harbison Park. In 2005, Whalsay F.C. took part in the Highland Amateur Cup, reaching the fourth knockout round. They beat Halkirk FC 2–0 in the 3rd round, but lost to Pentland Utd 2–1 in the 4th.

== Attractions ==
Attractions on the island include the Neolithic ruin of Benie Hoose and the settlement of Sudheim where Hugh MacDiarmid lived in the 1930s and early 1940s. Grieve House is now one of Shetland Amenity Trust's Böds which offers economic, self-catering accommodation in a traditional building. Scotland's great poet Hugh MacDiarmid (Christopher Grieve) lived for nine years in this croft house, where he wrote some of his best work.

== Media and the arts ==
Whalsay is the location for the 2011 novel Dancing with the Ferryman by Frankie Valente and is the main location of Ann Cleeves's novel Red Bones (Macmillan, 2009), the third of her Shetland quartet.

== 'Black fish' scandal ==
In 2012, a number of Whalsay fishermen were fined for a 'cynical and sophisticated' fishing scam involving the landing of tens of millions of pounds of illegally caught fish.

== See also ==
- List of islands of Scotland
