= Bluemull Sound =

Coordinates: 60°41′01″N 00°59′12″W

Location of Bluemull Sound between Unst and Yell islands

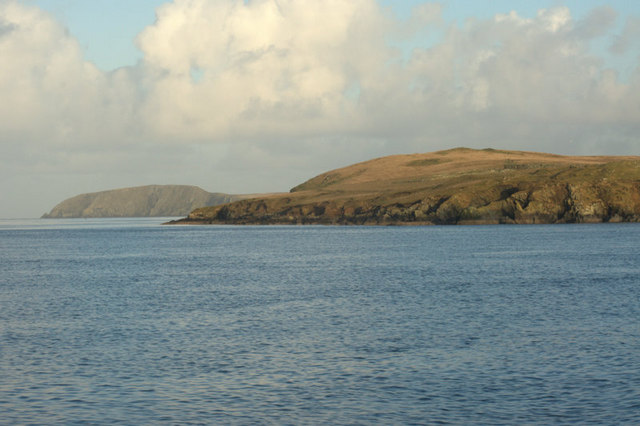
Hoga Ness to Blue Mull

Bluemull Sound (Shaetlan pronunciation: [ˈbluməɫ ˌsund] BLOO-məl-SOOND) is the strait between Unst and Yell in Shetland's North Isles. A ferry service crosses it regularly. Cullivoe is on the Yell side, and the island of Linga lies in the strait.

The Sound was referred to as "Blumel sound" in early 1800 nautical references It was later referred to as Bluemull Sound in 1865.

== Tidal power ==
The "world's first community-owned tidal power generator" became operational in Bluemull Sound in April 2014. The turbine is a 30 kW Nova Innovation device, owned by the North Yell Development Council and was connected to the local grid by 1 km subsea cable; helping power an ice house and up to 30 local homes. It has since been decommissioned.

Nova Innovation installed a 100 kW tidal turbine that was grid connected in August 2016, followed by two further turbines later that year. A fourth turbine was added in 2020, and two further turbines in January 2023 making it the largest number of turbines in a tidal-stream array. However, the three oldest turbines were removed just months later at the end of the EnFAIT project leaving the array at just 0.3 MW.
