= Vidlin =

Coordinates: 60.371°N 1.134°W

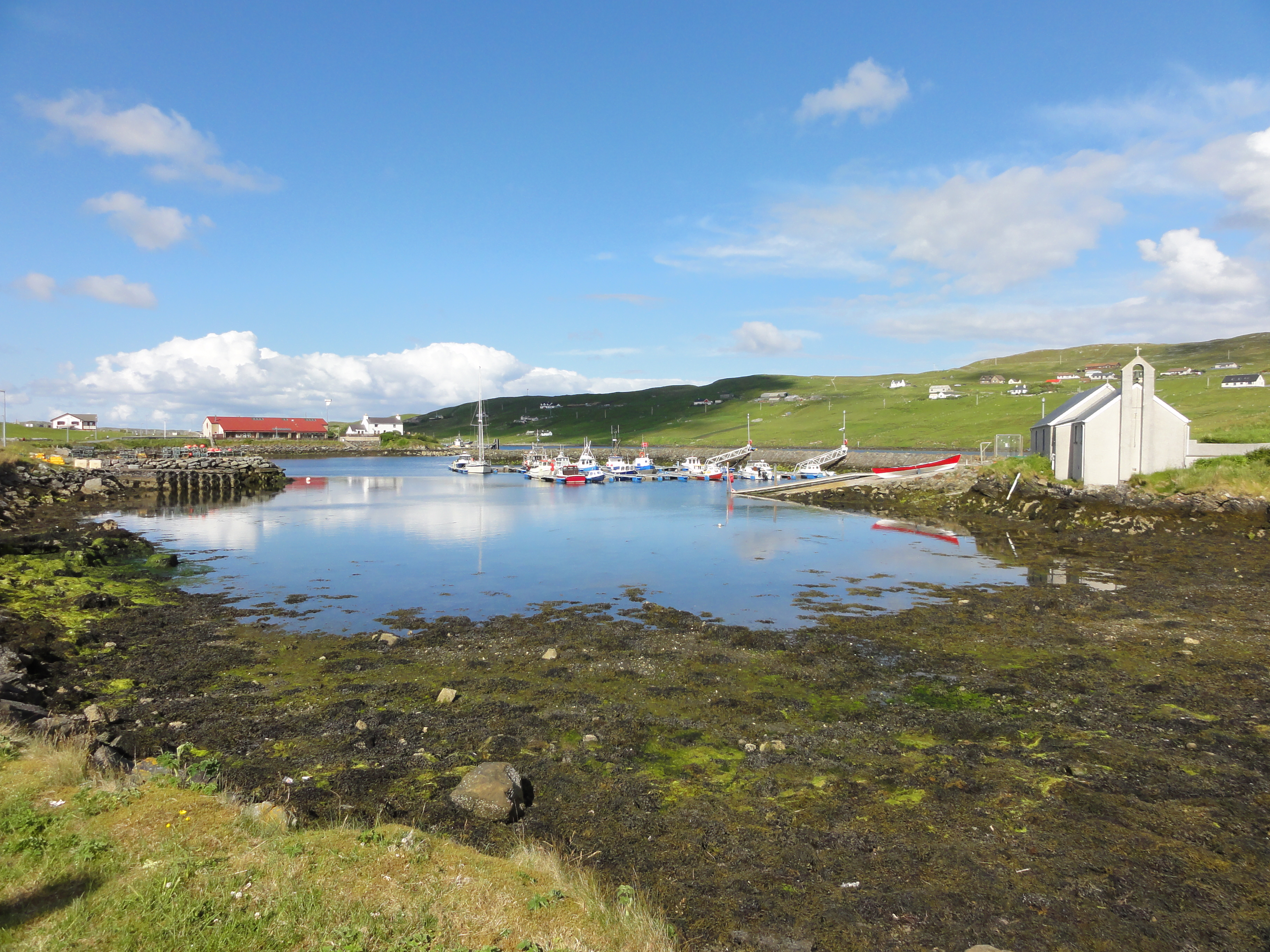
- Vidlin

- Location within Shetland
- OS grid reference: HU477654
- Civil parish: Nesting
- Council area: Shetland
- Lieutenancy area: Shetland
- Country: Scotland
- Sovereign state: United Kingdom
- Post town: SHETLAND
- Postcode district: ZE2
- Dialling code: 01806
- Police: Scotland
- Fire: Scottish
- Ambulance: Scottish
- UK Parliament: Orkney and Shetland
- Scottish Parliament: Shetland

Vidlin (Shaetlan pronunciation: ['vɪdlən] VID-lən; from Old Norse: Vaðill meaning a ford) is a small village located on Mainland, Shetland, Scotland. The settlement is within the parish of Nesting.

== History ==
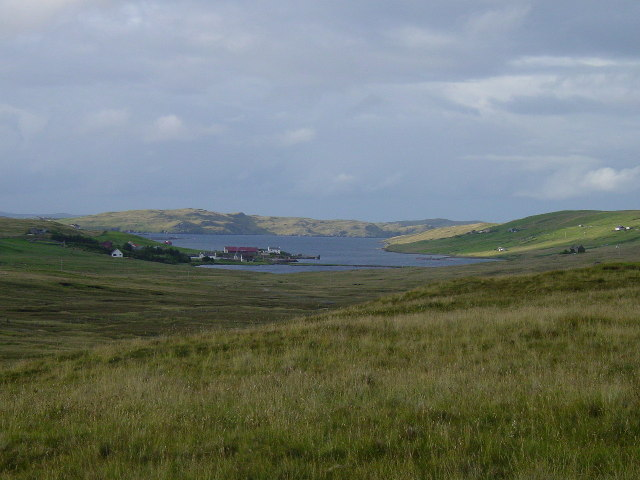
Vidlin and Vidlin Voe

It is at the head of Vidlin Voe, and is the modern heart of the old parish of Lunnasting, which centred on the early church at Lunna on Lunna Ness.

The Lunnasting stone, which bears an undeciphered Pictish ogham inscription was found nearby and donated to the National Museum of Antiquities of Scotland in 1876.

== Notable people ==
Steven Robertson is a theatre and film actor who has appeared in a number of successful films. He was born in Vidlin and attended the local school.

The poet Rhoda Bulter's mother came from Skelberry in Lunnasting, and she herself lived there for two crucially formative years when young.

The Walls poet Christine de Luca has written a memoir and a series of poems about the branch of her family which hailed from Vidlin, on her father Alexander Pearson's side, entitled Dreams in Time's Ocean (2004).

== Transport ==
Vidlin is served by service 19 that runs in the morning, at noon, and rush hour run by a J&DS Halcrow minibus. The Whalsay ferry sometimes departs from Vidlin Ferry Terminal in adverse weather conditions instead of its usual Laxo departure. The Out Skerries ferry departs from here on a bookings-only basis.
