= List of bays of the Shetland Islands =

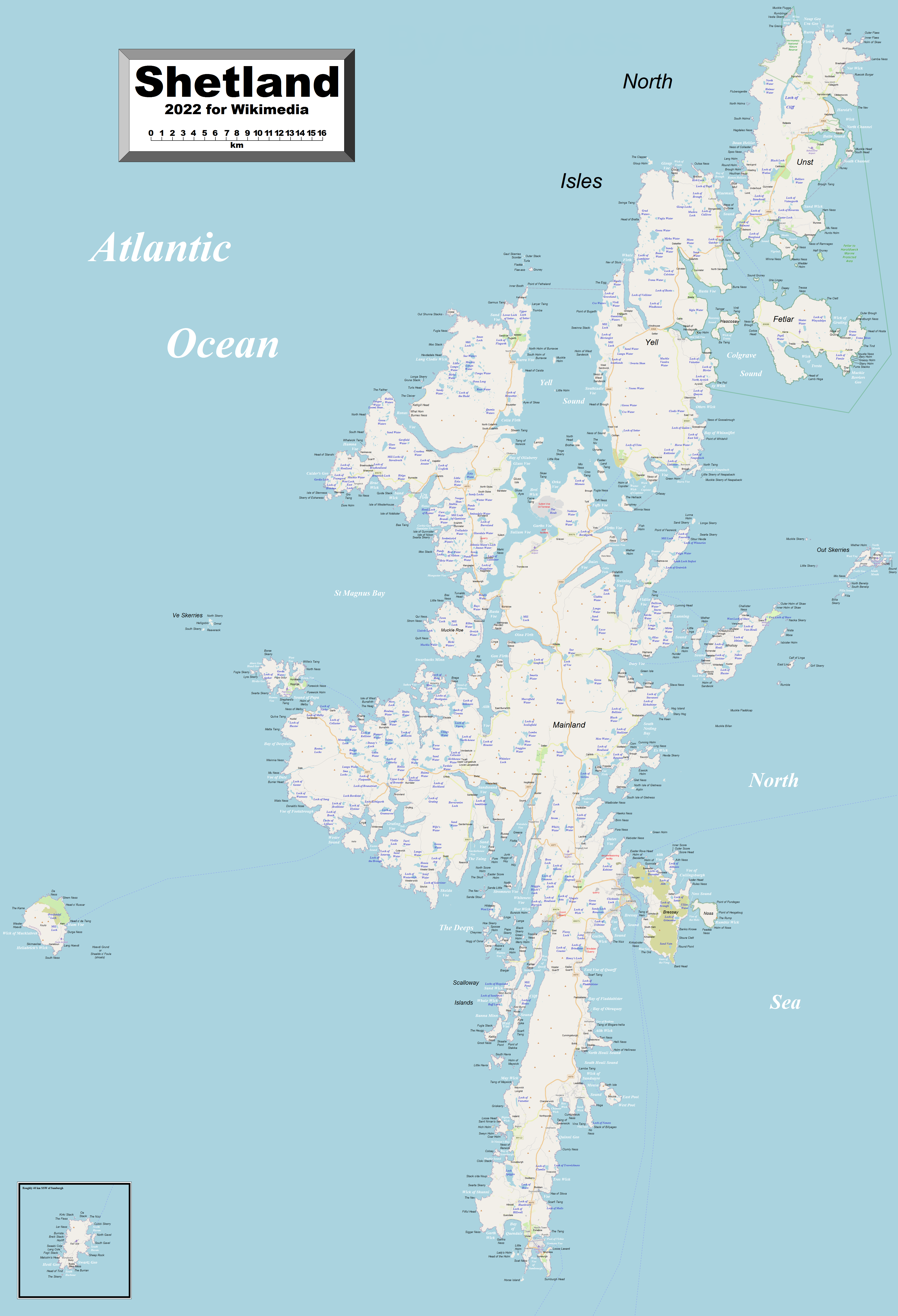
Detailed map of Shetland

This List of Bays of Shetland Islands summarises the bays that are located on the islands of the Shetland Islands in Scotland.

== Balta ==
The small island of Balta has no bays.

== Bigga ==
Name	County	Nearest Village	Coordinates	Image	Notes
Wester Hevda Wick	Zetland		60°29′50″N 1°11′58″W		
Eastern Hevda Wick	Zetland		60°29′56″N 1°11′30″W		

== Bressay ==
Name	County	Nearest Village	Coordinates	Image	Notes
Aith Voe	Zetland	Bressay	60°10′32″N 1°05′17″W		
Bay of Cuppa	Zetland	Heogan	60°09′48″N 1°03′29″W		
Bay of Heogan	Zetland	Heogan	60°10′17″N 1°08′42″W		
Bight of Ham	Zetland	Bressay	60°08′29″N 1°07′14″W		
Elvis Voe	Zetland	Bressay	60°11′06″N 1°05′15″W		
Minni of Aith	Zetland	Bressay	60°10′35″N 1°04′27″W		
Voe of Cullingsburgh	Zetland	Bressay	60°10′13″N 1°02′56″W		
Voe of Leiraness	Zetland	Bressay	60°09′11″N 1°07′06″W		

== Brother Isle ==
Brother Isle has no bays.

== East Burra ==
Name	County	Nearest Village	Coordinates	Image	Notes
Clivland Bay	Zetland	Grunasound	60°02′52″N 1°20′25″W		
Houb	Zetland	Grunasound	60°03′12″N 1°19′57″W		
Millburn Bay	Zetland	Grunasound	60°04′53″N 1°18′12″W		
South Voe	Zetland	Grunasound	60°04′21″N 1°19′57″W		
Voe of North House	Zetland	Grunasound	60°03′57″N 1°19′14″W		
Wick of Blumbister	Zetland	Grunasound	60°03′58″N 1°19′42″W		

== Fair Isle ==
Name	County	Nearest Village	Coordinates	Image	Notes
Bight of South Haven	Zetland		59°32′00″N 1°36′30″W		
North Haven	Zetland		59°32′23″N 1°36′11″W		
South Harbour	Zetland		59°30′40″N 1°38′41″W		
South Haven	Zetland		59°32′06″N 1°36′22″W		
Wick of Furse	Zetland		59°32′33″N 1°36′32″W		
Wick of Hestigeo	Zetland		59°30′53″N 1°39′24″W		

== Fetlar ==
Name	County	Nearest Village	Coordinates	Image	Notes
Filla Wick	Zetland		60°37′27″N 0°49′42″W		
Funzie Bay	Zetland	Houbie	60°35′02″N 0°47′23″W		
Wick of Aith	Zetland	Aith	60°35′13″N 0°49′56″W		
Wick of Houbie	Zetland	Houbie	60°35′23″N 0°51′43″W		
Wick of Gruting	Zetland	Houbie	60°36′28″N 0°48′33″W		
Wick of Tresta	Zetland	Houbie	60°34′41″N 0°50′57″W		

== Foula ==
Name	County	Nearest Village	Coordinates	Image	Notes
Da Voe	Zetland		60°08′05″N 2°02′46″W		
Ham Little	Zetland		60°07′48″N 2°02′50″W		
Hellabrik's Wick	Zetland		60°06′55″N 2°04′30″W		
Hiorawick	Zetland		60°09′21″N 2°04′11″W		
Mucklebrik's Wick	Zetland		60°07′41″N 2°05′58″W		

== Hascosay ==
Name	County	Nearest Village	Coordinates	Image	Notes
Djuba Wick	Zetland		60°37′02″N 0°59′02″W		
Housa Wick	Zetland		60°36′15″N 0°59′51″W		
The Bow of Hascosay	Zetland		60°36′36″N 1°00′18″W		

== Hildasay ==
Name	CountyHildasay	Nearest Village	Coordinates	Image	Notes
Cusa Voe	Zetland		60°08′29″N 1°22′02″W		
Djuba Voe	Zetland		60°08′20″N 1°21′39″W		
Tangi Voe	Zetland		60°08′25″N 1°21′47″W		

== Lamba ==
Name	CountyHildasay	Nearest Village	Coordinates	Image	Notes
Wick of Lamba	Zetland		60°30′47″N 1°17′28″W		

== Linga ==
The small island of Linga has no bays.

== Mainland ==
Name	County	Nearest Village	Coordinates	Image	Notes
Aith Voe	Zetland	Aith	60°18′16″N 1°22′24″W		
Aith Wick	Zetland	Brae	60°02′55″N 1°11′52″W		
Aith Wick	Zetland	Bremirehoull	60°02′14″N 1°12′44″W		
As Wick	Zetland	Garth	60°15′31″N 1°08′34″W		
Ayre of Brae	Zetland	Brae	60°23′38″N 1°21′19″W		
Bay of Brenwell	Zetland	Sandness	60°17′50″N 1°35′28″W		
Bay of Deepdale	Zetland	Sandness	60°16′43″N 1°41′17″W		
Bay of Fladdabister	Zetland	Sandness	60°04′30″N 1°12′41″W		
Bay of Garth	Zetland	Sandness	60°18′24″N 1°36′49″W		
Bay of Okraquoy	Zetland	Bremirehoull	60°03′55″N 1°12′37″W		
Bay of Ollaberry	Zetland	Ollaberry	60°30′15″N 1°20′13″W		
Bay of Quendale	Zetland	Boddam	59°53′35″N 1°19′57″W		
Bay of Scousburgh	Zetland	Scousburgh	59°56′56″N 1°20′10″W		
Bight of Bellister	Zetland	Bellister	60°19′32″N 1°07′27″W		
Bight of Boga	Zetland	North Roe	60°36′43″N 1°20′39″W		
Bight of Brimness	Zetland	Gott	60°13′10″N 1°10′06″W		
Bight of Gremista	Zetland	Lerwick	60°10′12″N 1°09′45″W		
Bight of Haggrister	Zetland	Brae	60°24′37″N 1°22′08″W		
Bight of Niddister	Zetland	Hillswick	60°27′43″N 1°29′09″W		
Bight of Stavaness	Zetland	Bellister	60°19′29″N 1°06′04″W		
Bight of Valayre	Zetland	Brae	60°24′30″N 1°22′24″W		
Bight of Vatsland	Zetland	Lerwick	60°11′37″N 1°09′08″W		
Boatsroom Voe	Zetland	Vidlin	60°25′11″N 1°06′22″W		
Brae Wick	Zetland	Braehoulland	60°29′02″N 1°33′11″W		
Brei Wick	Zetland	Lerwick	60°08′42″N 1°08′55″W		
Brei Wick	Zetland	Gott	60°12′14″N 1°11′06″W		
Brindister Voe	Zetland	Braehoulland	60°17′58″N 1°29′07″W		
Bur Wick	Zetland	Scalloway	60°08′47″N 1°17′44″W		
Burra Voe	Zetland	North Roe	60°34′59″N 1°19′39″W		
Burrier Wick	Zetland	North Roe	60°36′41″N 1°25′45″W		
Busta Voe	Zetland	Brae	60°23′38″N 1°21′19″W		
Cat Firth	Zetland	Nesting	60°14′45″N 1°11′18″W		
Channer Wick	Zetland	Hoswick	59°59′21″N 1°16′17″W		
Colla Firth	Zetland	Grutin	60°24′39″N 1°11′29″W		
Colla Firth	Zetland	Ollaberry	60°32′03″N 1°20′07″W		
Coppa Wick	Zetland	Sandness	60°15′41″N 1°41′38″W		
Dale Voe	Zetland	Brae	60°27′50″N 1°19′41″W		
Dales Voe	Zetland	Grutin	60°24′57″N 1°13′14″W		
Dales Voe	Zetland	Twatt	60°12′19″N 1°10′55″W		
Dock of Lingness	Zetland	Brough	60°16′24″N 1°07′18″W		
Dury Voe	Zetland	Laxo	60°20′19″N 1°07′29″W		
Easter Wick	Zetland	North Roe	60°37′45″N 1°18′51″W		
East Lunna Voe	Zetland	Vidlin	60°24′03″N 1°07′03″W		
East Voe of Quarff	Zetland	Quarff	60°05′57″N 1°13′11″W		
East Voe of Skellister	Zetland	Brough	60°16′30″N 1°08′39″W		
Effirth Voe	Zetland	Twatt	60°15′15″N 1°25′27″W		
Ell Wick	Zetland	Brae	60°23′44″N 1°22′37″W		
Es Wick	Zetland	Brough	60°16′14″N 1°06′22″W		
Feor Wick	Zetland	Vidlin	60°26′48″N 1°04′06″W		
Firths Voe	Zetland	Mossbank	60°26′57″N 1°10′54″W		
Foraness Voe	Zetland	Gott	60°12′48″N 1°10′28″W		
Garderhouse Voe	Zetland	Leeans	60°12′31″N 1°23′54″W		
Garths Voe	Zetland	Mossbank	60°26′48″N 1°16′07″W		
Gluss Voe	Zetland	Ollaberry	60°29′29″N 1°20′09″W		
Grunna Voe	Zetland	Vidlin	60°22′58″N 1°08′19″W		
Gruting Voe	Zetland	Gruting	60°13′06″N 1°30′58″W		
Grutness Voe	Zetland	Sumburgh	59°52′31″N 1°16′49″W		
Gulber Wick	Zetland	Gulberwick	59°52′32″N 1°16′51″W		
Gunnister Voe	Zetland	Gunnister	60°26′56″N 1°26′10″W		
Hamar Voe	Zetland	Urafirth	60°28′00″N 1°26′50″W		
Hamna Voe	Zetland	Braehoulland	60°30′17″N 1°34′15″W		
Hamna Voe	Zetland	Vidlin	60°25′30″N 1°06′17″W		
Hos Wick	Zetland	Hoswick	59°59′39″N 1°15′17″W		
Houb of Burravoe	Zetland	Brae	60°23′01″N 1°20′48″W		
Ireland Wick	Zetland	Bigton	59°58′36″N 1°19′52″W		
Kaila	Zetland	Sandness	60°18′25″N 1°39′07″W		
Kels Wick	Zetland	Vidlin	60°24′17″N 1°06′14″W		
Lang Clodie Wick	Zetland	Ollaberry	60°34′44″N 1°26′32″W		
Laxo Voe	Zetland	Laxo	60°21′01″N 1°10′34″W		
Lax Firth	Zetland	Gott	60°12′49″N 1°12′11″W		
Lera Voe	Zetland	Walls	60°13′03″N 1°36′01″W		
Leven Wick	Zetland	Hoswick	59°58′34″N 1°15′43″W		
Longa Voe	Zetland	Aith	60°19′21″N 1°25′24″W		
Loura Voe	Zetland	Laxfirth	60°15′33″N 1°11′23″W		
May Wick	Zetland	May Wick	60°00′24″N 1°19′38″W		
Nor Wick	Zetland	Ollaberry	60°30′57″N 1°19′55″W		
North Bight of Rovahead	Zetland	Lerwick	60°11′28″N 1°08′51″W		
North Voe of Gletness	Zetland	Gletness	60°14′57″N 1°08′52″W		
North Wick	Zetland	North Roe	60°37′00″N 1°24′42″W		
Olas Voe	Zetland	Selivoe	60°12′23″N 1°29′38″W		
Orka Voe	Zetland	Mossbank	60°28′51″N 1°15′45″W		
Orr Wick	Zetland	Ollaberry	60°30′48″N 1°23′52″W		
Orra Wick	Zetland	Vidlin	60°23′18″N 1°04′56″W		
Pund Voe	Zetland	Scalloway	60°07′58″N 1°18′06″W		
Quey Firth	Zetland	Ollaberry	60°31′10″N 1°20′11″W		
Raa Wick	Zetland	North Roe	60°28′51″N 1°15′43″W		
Rea Wick	Zetland	Skeld	60°11′07″N 1°24′17″W		
Riven Noust	Zetland	Vidlin	60°26′21″N 1°04′53″W		
Sand Voe	Zetland	Leeans	60°36′04″N 1°20′15″W		
Sand Wick	Zetland	Sandwick	59°59′24″N 1°13′28″W		
Scutta Voe	Zetland	Gruting	60°13′49″N 1°30′07″W		
Seli Voe	Zetland	Gruting	60°12′59″N 1°29′05″W		
Sil Wick	Zetland	Silwick	60°09′34″N 1°28′20″W		
Skelda Voe	Zetland	Skeld	60°10′30″N 1°26′33″W		
Skipadock	Zetland	Brae	60°24′09″N 1°22′53″W		
Skletta Bay	Zetland	Vidlin	60°23′35″N 1°06′13″W		
South Bay of Eswick	Zetland	Benston	60°15′41″N 1°07′21″W		
South Bight of Rovahead	Zetland	Lerwick	60°11′20″N 1°08′44″W		
South Nesting Bay	Zetland	Skellister	60°17′14″N 1°06′52″W		
South Voe of Gletness	Zetland	Gletness	60°14′28″N 1°09′46″W		
South Wick	Zetland	North Roe	60°36′01″N 1°25′50″W		
Stead of Aithsness	Zetland	Aith	60°19′06″N 1°25′02″W		
Stead of Culswick	Zetland	Culswick	60°10′55″N 1°30′47″W		
Swining Voe	Zetland	Vidlin	60°23′54″N 1°09′37″W		
Swinister Voe	Zetland	Mossbank	60°26′06″N 1°10′35″W		
St Ninian's Bay	Zetland	Culswick	59°57′59″N 1°20′12″W		
The Crook	Zetland	Aith	60°19′02″N 1°05′15″W		
The Groot	Zetland	Laxfirth	60°18′18″N 1°38′57″W		
The Vadills	Zetland	Vidlin	60°25′07″N 1°06′05″W		
Tang Wick	Zetland	Braehoulland	60°28′43″N 1°34′56″W		
The Houb	Zetland	Walls	60°13′16″N 1°33′11″W		
The Houb	Zetland	Walls	60°12′14″N 1°12′24″W	Bay in Lax Firth	
Tofts Voe	Zetland	Mossbank	60°27′53″N 1°11′56″W		
Trea Wick	Zetland	Vidlin	60°24′24″N 1°10′00″W		
Tresta Voe	Zetland	Tresta	60°14′33″N 1°21′36″W		
Tros Wick	Zetland	Boddam	59°55′57″N 1°16′06″W		
Vassa Voe	Zetland	Nesting	60°15′23″N 1°10′21″W		
Vidlin Voe	Zetland	Vidlin	60°23′02″N 1°07′29″W		
Voe	Zetland	Boddam	59°55′08″N 1°17′03″W		
Voe of Browland	Zetland	Walls	60°14′12″N 1°31′19″W		
Voe of the Brig	Zetland	Housetter	60°32′19″N 1°20′58″W		
Voe of Clousta	Zetland	Twatt	60°18′00″N 1°27′17″W		
Voe of Dale	Zetland	Walls	60°15′05″N 1°41′37″W		
Voe of Footabrough	Zetland	Walls	60°13′31″N 1°38′53″W		
Voe of Littlure	Zetland	Walls	60°12′45″N 1°37′56″W		
Voe of Scatsta	Zetland	Mossbank	60°26′35″N 1°16′59″W		
Voe of Snarraness	Zetland	Mossbank	60°17′41″N 1°34′41″W		
Voe of Sound	Zetland	Lerwick	60°08′02″N 1°10′05″W		
Voxter Voe	Zetland	Brae	60°24′35″N 1°20′12″W		
Wadbister Voe	Zetland	girlsta	60°14′10″N 1°12′34″W		
Wick of Housabister	Zetland	Brettabister	60°18′09″N 1°06′46″W		
Weisdale Voe	Zetland	Hellister	60°12′58″N 1°18′58″W		
West Lunna Voe	Zetland	Vidlin	60°24′19″N 1°07′43″W		
Wester Wick	Zetland	Westerwick	60°37′52″N 1°19′03″W		
West Voe of Skellister	Zetland	Skellister	60°16′55″N 1°08′57″W		
West Voe of Sumburgh	Zetland	Sumburgh	59°51′43″N 1°17′36″W		
West Voe of Quarff	Zetland	Quarff	60°05′56″N 1°16′34″W		
Whal Wick	Zetland	Braehoulland	60°30′52″N 1°34′09″W		
Whiteness Voe	Zetland	Wadbister	60°11′27″N 1°17′32″W		
Wick of Breibister	Zetland	Gulberwick	60°37′33″N 1°18′53″W		
Wick of Burland	Zetland	North Roe	60°06′24″N 1°12′13″W		
Wick of Glachon	Zetland	Vidlin	60°26′40″N 1°02′57″W		
Wick of Neap	Zetland	Neap	60°18′26″N 1°05′17″W		
Wick of Sandsayre	Zetland	North Roe	60°00′32″N 1°13′12″W		
Wick of Shunni	Zetland	Boddam	59°55′14″N 1°22′17″W		
Wick of Virdibreck	Zetland	North Roe	60°36′10″N 1°18′24″W		
Wick of Watsness	Zetland	Watsness	60°14′06″N 1°40′56″W		
Yarfils Wick	Zetland	Brae	60°29′25″N 1°18′44″W		

== Mousa ==
Name	CountyHildasay	Nearest Village	Coordinates	Image	Notes
East Ham	Zetland		60°00′13″N 1°10′36″W		
West Ham	Zetland		60°00′04″N 1°11′13″W		

== Muckle Roe ==
Name	County	Nearest Village	Coordinates	Image	Notes
Mucke Ayre	Zetland		60°20′51″N 1°25′30″W		
North Ham	Zetland		60°22′47″N 1°27′10″W		
Otter Ayre	Zetland		60°22′53″N 1°24′49″W		
South Ham	Zetland		60°22′28″N 1°27′44″W		

== Isle of Noss ==
Name	County	Nearest Village	Coordinates	Image	Notes
Nesti Voe	Zetland		60°08′54″N 1°02′40″W		
Voe of the Mels	Zetland		60°08′41″N 1°02′16″W		

== Oxna Shetland ==
Name	County	Nearest Village	Coordinates	Image	Notes
Little Voe	Zetland		60°07′02″N 1°21′46″W		
Sandy Voe	Zetland		60°07′13″N 1°21′48″W		

== Papa ==
Name	County	Nearest Village	Coordinates	Image	Notes
Caishie Voe	Zetland		60°07′23″N 1°21′28″W		
Croo Bight	Zetland		60°07′26″N 1°20′48″W		
North Voe	Zetland		60°07′24″N 1°20′17″W		
South Voe	Zetland		60°07′10″N 1°20′31″W		
Tangi Voe	Zetland		60°07′17″N 1°21′06″W		

== Papa Little ==
Name	County	Nearest Village	Coordinates	Image	Notes
Bight of Warwick	Zetland	Brae	60°19′58″N 1°22′43″W		

== Papa Stour ==
Name	County	Nearest Village	Coordinates	Image	Notes
Culla Voe	Zetland	Biggings	60°20′20″N 1°41′49″W		
Hamna Voe	Zetland	Biggings	60°19′19″N 1°42′29″W		
Housa Voe	Zetland	Biggings	60°19′43″N 1°40′15″W		
Scopa Wick	Zetland	Biggings	60°20′11″N 1°39′50″W		
Sholma Wick	Zetland	Biggings	60°20′31″N 1°42′27″W		
West Voe	Zetland	Biggings	60°20′12″N 1°41′08″W		

== Samphrey ==
The small island of Samphrey has no bays.

== South Havra ==
Name	County	Nearest Village	Coordinates	Image	Notes
The Harbour	Zetland		60°01′14″N 1°21′14″W		
West Ham	Zetland		60°01′22″N 1°21′21″W		

== Trondra ==
The tiny island of Trondra has no bays.

== Unst ==
Name	County	Nearest Village	Coordinates	Image	Notes
Brei Wick	Zetland		60°49′56″N 0°49′33″W		
Burga Wick	Zetland	Haroldswick	60°42′29″N 0°51′46″W		
Burra Firth	Zetland	Valsgarth	60°49′37″N 0°51′44″W		
Fiska Wick	Zetland	Valsgarth	60°48′49″N 0°52′23″W		
Girr Wick	Zetland	Valsgarth	60°48′01″N 0°46′54″W		
Harold's Wick	Zetland	Haroldswick	60°46′56″N 0°48′51″W		
Looss Wick	Zetland	Baltasound	60°50′36″N 0°53′25″W		
Lunda Wick	Zetland	Baltasound	60°43′17″N 0°58′04″W		
Ham of Muness	Zetland	Baltasound	60°41′45″N 0°50′44″W		
Nor Wick	Zetland	Haroldswick	60°48′33″N 0°47′24″W		
Sand Wick	Zetland	Muness	60°42′01″N 0°51′41″W		
Scolla Wick	Zetland	Haroldswick	60°40′56″N 0°50′33″W		
Snarra Voe	Zetland	Baltasound	60°41′49″N 0°58′11″W		
Wick of Belmont	Zetland	Belmont	60°40′58″N 0°58′17″W	cennter	
Wick of Collaster	Zetland	Baltasound	60°44′43″N 0°56′58″W		
Wick of Hagdale	Zetland	Baltasound	60°46′21″N 0°49′02″W		
Wick of Smirgirt	Zetland	Muness	60°42′21″N 0°51′51″W		
Wick of Skaw	Zetland	Valsgarth	60°49′32″N 0°47′07″W		
Wood Wick	Zetland	Valsgarth	60°46′57″N 0°56′03″W		

== Uyea, Unst ==
Name	County	Nearest Village	Coordinates	Image	Notes
Brei Wick	Zetland		60°40′00″N 0°52′54″W		
Staeta Wick	Zetland		60°39′54″N 0°53′08″W		

== Vaila ==
Name	County	Nearest Village	Coordinates	Image	Notes
Muckle Bight	Zetland		60°11′35″N 1°34′44″W		
Voe of Vaila	Zetland		60°12′26″N 1°35′46″W		

== Vementry ==
Name	County	Nearest Village	Coordinates	Image	Notes
Lamba Wick	Zetland		60°19′50″N 1°27′02″W		
North Voe	Zetland		60°19′52″N 1°26′42″W		
Northra Voe	Zetland		60°20′05″N 1°28′22″W		
Peerie Voe	Zetland		60°19′27″N 1°26′59″W		
Seggi Bight	Zetland		60°19′06″N 1°27′53″W		
South Voe	Zetland		60°19′36″N 1°26′46″W		
Suthra Voe	Zetland		60°19′32″N 1°28′28″W		
Trea Wick	Zetland		60°30′44″N 1°34′24″W		

== West Burra ==
Name	County	Nearest Village	Coordinates	Image	Notes
Banna Minn	Zetland		60°03′36″N 1°20′49″W		
Bight of the Sandy Geos	Zetland		60°02′49″N 1°21′18″W		
Hamna Voe	Zetland		60°06′18″N 1°20′29″W		
Sand Wick	Zetland		60°04′56″N 1°20′41″W		
Whale Wick	Zetland		60°04′24″N 1°21′10″W		

== West Linga ==
Name	County	Nearest Village	Coordinates	Image	Notes
Bight of Cudda	Zetland		60°21′33″N 1°01′56″W		
Croo Wick	Zetland		60°21′09″N 1°02′37″W		

== Whalsay ==
Name	County	Nearest Village	Coordinates	Image	Notes
North Voe	Zetland	Symbister	60°20′49″N 1°01′11″W		
Sand Wick	Zetland	Sandwick	60°19′59″N 1°01′29″W		
Skaw Voe	Zetland	Skaw	60°22′42″N 0°56′10″W		
Symbister Bay	Zetland	Symbister	60°20′31″N 1°01′40″W		
Vai Voe	Zetland	Skaw	60°22′49″N 0°57′19″W		

== Yell ==
Name	County	Nearest Village	Coordinates	Image	Notes
Ay Wick	Zetland	Aywick	60°33′39″N 1°01′12″W		
Basta Voe	Zetland	Sellafirth	60°38′27″N 1°02′30″W		
Bay of Brough	Zetland	Cullivoe	60°43′18″N 1°00′36″W		
Bay of Ulsta	Zetland	Ulsta	60°29′42″N 1°09′25″W		
Bay of Whinnifirt	Zetland	Gossabrough	60°31′29″N 1°01′37″W		
Burra Voe	Zetland	Burravoe	60°29′37″N 1°03′21″W		
Culli Voe	Zetland	Cullivoe	60°42′03″N 1°00′01″W		
Gloup Voe	Zetland	Gloup	60°43′22″N 1°04′45″W		
Hamna Voe	Zetland	Hamnavoe	60°29′53″N 1°06′55″W		
Ladies Hole	Zetland	Burravoe	60°30′07″N 1°02′10″W		
Ler Wick	Zetland	West Sandwick	60°36′40″N 1°11′50″W		
Mid Yell Voe	Zetland	Mid Yell	60°36′11″N 1°03′30″W		
North Wick of Sound	Zetland	West Sandwick	60°31′37″N 1°10′52″W		
Otters Wick	Zetland	Otterswick	60°32′48″N 1°02′36″W		
Papil Bay	Zetland	Cullivoe	60°42′55″N 1°00′11″W		
Sand Wick	Zetland	Gutcher	60°38′57″N 0°59′52″W		
Salt Wick	Zetland	Otterswick	60°34′59″N 1°00′56″W		
Salt Wick	Zetland	Otterswick	60°35′01″N 1°00′54″W		The north Salt Wick
Southladie Voe	Zetland	West Sandwick	60°34′01″N 1°11′04″W		
South Wick of Sound	Zetland	West Sandwick	60°31′14″N 1°10′44″W		
Vats Wick	Zetland	Burravoe	60°29′28″N 1°03′05″W		
West Sand Wick	Zetland	West Sandwick	60°34′57″N 1°11′24″W		
Wester Wick of Copister	Zetland	Ulsta	60°29′11″N 1°08′24″W		
Whale Firth	Zetland	Grimister	60°38′00″N 1°08′57″W		
Wick of Breckon	Zetland	Breckon	60°43′41″N 1°02′39″W		
Wick of Copister	Zetland	Copister	60°29′09″N 1°08′01″W		
Wick of Gossabrough	Zetland	Gossabrough	60°32′03″N 1°02′00″W		
Wick of Gutcher	Zetland	Gutcher	60°40′26″N 0°59′49″W		
Wick of North Garth	Zetland	Gutcher	60°41′02″N 0°59′56″W		
Wick of Trutis	Zetland	Gloup	60°43′52″N 1°04′01″W		
Wick of Vatsetter	Zetland	Mid Yell	60°35′20″N 1°01′35″W		
Wick of Whallerie	Zetland	Gloup	60°43′35″N 1°04′34″W		

== See also ==
- List of bays of the Firth of Clyde
- List of bays of Scotland
- List of bays of the Outer Hebrides
- List of bays of the Inner Hebrides
- List of bays of the Orkney Islands
