= Aith =

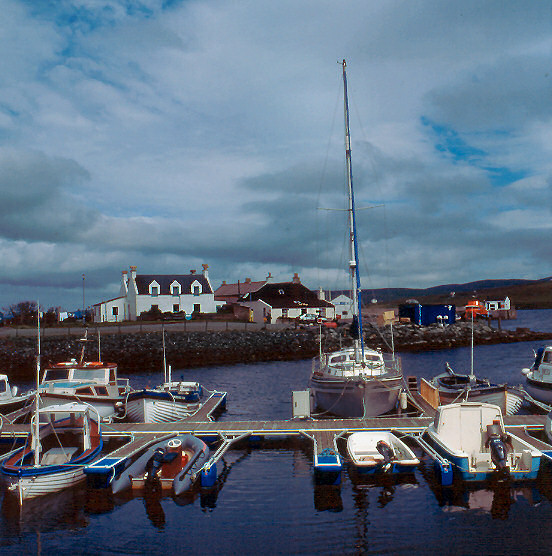
- Aith Marina, shop & lifeboat

- Location within Shetland
- OS grid reference: HU344557
- Civil parish: Sandsting
- Council area: Shetland
- Lieutenancy area: Shetland
- Country: Scotland
- Sovereign state: United Kingdom
- Post town: SHETLAND
- Postcode district: ZE2
- Dialling code: 01595
- Police: Scotland
- Fire: Scottish
- Ambulance: Scottish
- UK Parliament: Orkney and Shetland
- Scottish Parliament: Shetland

Aith (Shaetlan: Eid, pronounced [eːd], Old Norse: Eið, meaning Isthmus, cf Eday), is a village on the Northern coast of the West Shetland Mainland, Scotland at the southern end of Aith Voe, some 21 miles (34 kilometres) west of Lerwick.

Aith lies on the B9071 that runs south to the junction with the A971 (which links Lerwick to the west of Shetland) at the village of Bixter and North East via East Burrafirth to the junction with the A970 (which links Lerwick to the North) at the village of Voe. A single track road leads north from Aith along the west shoreline of Aith Voe to Vementry.

Every year in early June the Aith Lifeboat Gala is held to raise money for the Royal National Lifeboat Institution, featuring a jarl squad and displays by the Shetland Coastguard among other activities.

== History ==
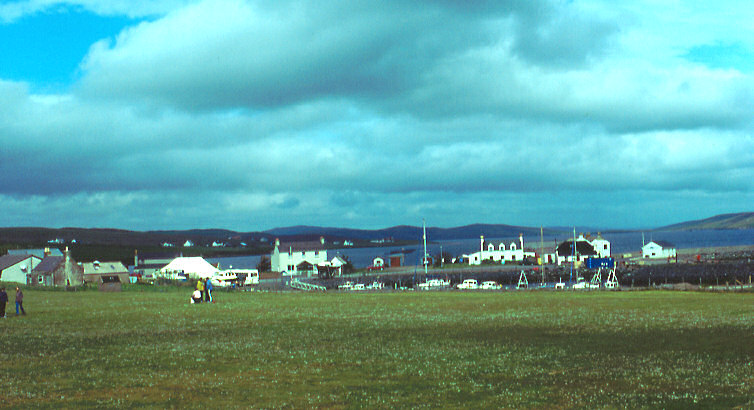
Aith village

The modern settlement occupies an area originally named Aithsting during the period of Norse occupation. The surrounding parish is still known as Aithsting.

== Buildings and structures ==
- Aith Lifeboat Station is the most northerly in Britain, established in 1933.
- Aith Junior High School is situated in the centre of the village. The school has nursery, primary, and secondary departments with a combined roll of around 190–200. The secondary roll includes pupils from Sandness, Skeld, Happyhansel and Aith primary schools. The original school building, which opened in 1922 and became a Junior High in 1970, was located on the east of the main settlement, below the junction of the B9071 and Whitelaw Road. The school relocated to a new building in the more central location in 1982 60°17′02″N 1°22′39″W
- West Mainland Leisure Centre, opened on 7 September 2002 and is operated by Shetland Recreational Trust. Facilities include a main hall, squash court, swimming pool with paddling pool, fitness suite and health suite.
- Aith Marina
- Aith Community Hall, incorporating the Rankin Lounge.

== Notable events ==
On 20 February 2008 several houses in Aith were evacuated due to a fire in the local garage prompting fears that oxyacetylene canisters stored there might explode. The garage was destroyed and the site later cleared.
