= Stanydale =

Coordinates: 60.242°N 1.486°W

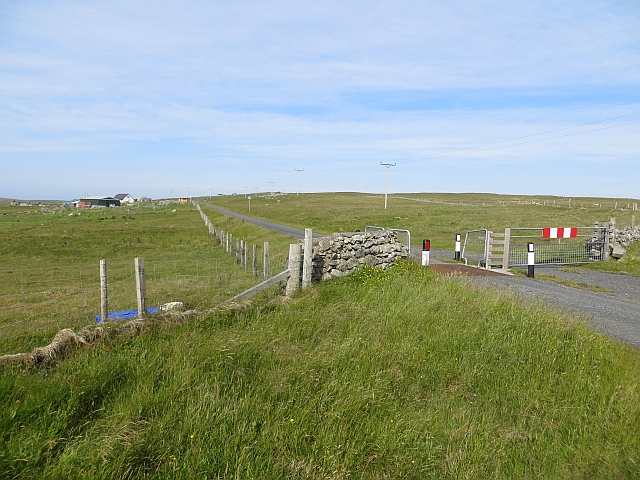
- The road towards the hamlet of Stanydale

- Location within Shetland
- OS grid reference: HU285505
- Civil parish: Sandsting
- Council area: Shetland
- Country: Scotland
- Sovereign state: United Kingdom
- Post town: SHETLAND
- Postcode district: ZE2
- Dialling code: 01595
- Police: Scotland
- Fire: Scottish
- Ambulance: Scottish
- UK Parliament: Orkney and Shetland
- Scottish Parliament: Shetland

Stanydale is a hamlet on the island of Mainland, Shetland, Scotland. The archaeological site of Stanydale Temple is less than 0.5 miles (0.80 km) to the south of the crofters' houses. There are three cairns on the ridge to the north of the hamlet, just over 100 feet (30 m) above the sea. The west cairn was described in 1931 as "A round cairn, about 50' in diameter and 3' high, which has been much destroyed."
