= Cuppa =

Cuppa may refer to:

- UK slang for a prepared cup of black tea
- Cuppa Coffee Studios, an animation studio in Toronto
- Bay of Cuppa in the Shetland Islands, Scotland

== See also ==
- Cuppae, an ancient Roman city in Illyria; now in Serbia
- Cuppas, a suit of cards in Italian playing cards
- Cuppa Joe
- Copper (disambiguation)
- Cup (disambiguation)
