= Thomas Finlay =

Thomas Finlay may refer to:

- Thomas Finlay (Cumann na nGaedheal politician) (1893–1932), Irish Cumann na nGaedhael politician and lawyer
- Thomas Finlay (judge) (1922–2017), Irish Fine Gael politician and former Supreme Court Chief Justice
- Thomas A. Finlay (1848–1940), Irish Catholic priest, economist, philosopher and editor
- Tom Finlay (1897–1967), Irish hurler
- Thomas Matthew Finlay (1879–1954), Scottish geologist

== See also ==
- Tom Finley (1903–1933), American baseball player
