= Broch of Cullingsburgh =

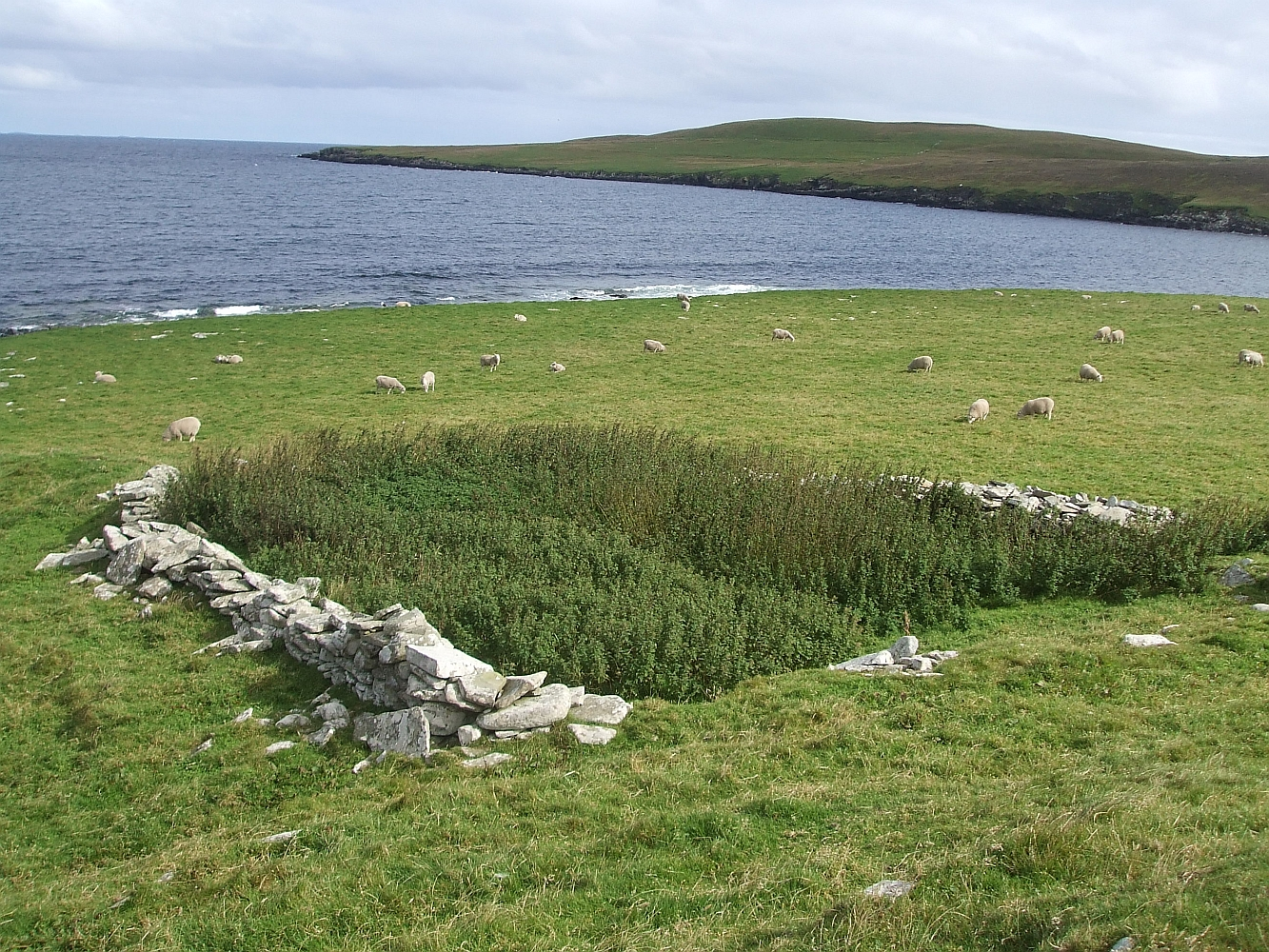
- Broch of Cullingsburgh

- Location in Shetland, Scotland
- 60°09′43″N 1°03′47″W
- Type: Broch
- Periods: Iron Age, Roman
- Location: Shetland

The Broch of Cullingsburgh is an Iron Age broch located in the Shetland islands.

== Location ==
Located on Bressay, off the east coast of mainland Shetland, Cullingsburgh Broch is situated on an elevated area of ground overlooking the Bay of Cuppa on the east coast of the island.

== History ==
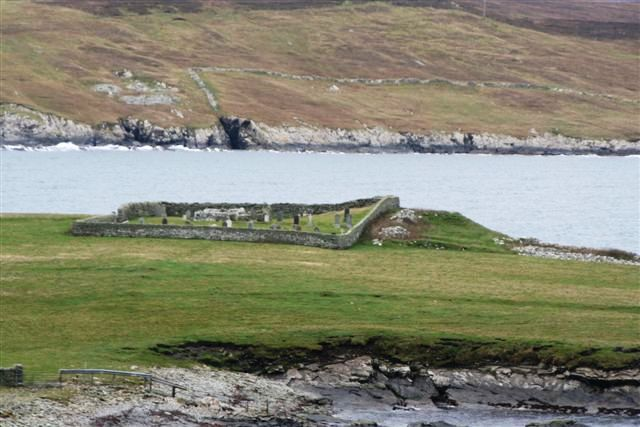
St Mary's church and yard with the ruined broch to the side at right

Very little is left of the broch. The later (now ruined) church of St. Mary was likely built of stones mined from it. The church of St. Mary had an associated settlement and cemetery. The site is a Scheduled Monument.

== Archaeological Finds ==
The Pictish Bressay Stone was found near St. Mary's Church in 1852. This is an upright, schist slab with relief designs on the two broad sides and ogham inscriptions on the narrow sides. The inscription is reported to be a memorial for the daughter of a chieftain. The Bressay Stone is now on display in the National Museum of Scotland in Edinburgh, however a replica of the stone is located inside the cemetery.
