= William Elgin Swinton =

Scottish paleontologist

William Elgin Swinton FRSE FLS (30 September 1900 in Kirkcaldy – 12 June 1994 in Toronto), was a Scottish paleontologist.

== Life ==
William Swinton was born in Kirkcaldy in Fife, the son of William Wilson Swinton, a clerk, and Rachel Cargill; he had one sibling, his younger sister Mary. He received his secondary education in Dundee and Glenalmond College. From 1917, he studied Sciences at the University of Glasgow, graduating BSc in 1922. In 1920, he partook in an expedition to Spitsbergen. Between 1922 and 1924, he was an assistant at the geology department of the British Museum (Natural History) in London. Subsequently, Swinton was appointed as a curator of fossil amphibians, reptiles and birds. In 1933, he received his first doctorate (Ph.D) from the University of Glasgow.

In 1932 he was elected a Fellow of the Royal Society of Edinburgh. His proposers were Douglas Alexander Allan, Robert Campbell, Herbert Harold Read and Thomas Matthew Finlay.

He enlisted in the Royal Navy in 1937, and served during the entire Second World War with Navy intelligence, eventually reaching the rank of Lieutenant commander. In the late 1950s he joined an expedition to climb Mount Everest, but he failed to reach the summit. He received the Darwin Medal from the USSR Academy of Sciences in 1959. Two years later, he emigrated to Canada to take up a post in Toronto.

== Career at the British Museum (Natural History) ==
At the museum, Swinton was responsible for writing a large number of museum guides and books; the latter mainly popularizing works about paleontology. One of his most famous works was The Dinosaurs from 1934. These books were translated into many languages, making him influential in determining the public perception of dinosaurs in the middle of the twentieth century. However, his ideas on dinosaur anatomy, ecology and systematics were already old-fashioned in the 1930s, while his evolutionary concepts were formed during the eclipse of Darwinism. These problems became worse as the books were being reprinted for decades.

== Career in Canada ==
Swinton left the BMNH in 1961, to accept a post as professor of zoology at the University of Toronto, Canada. He combined this post with the directorship of the department of biology at the Royal Ontario Museum, and was soon appointed a Fellow of the Royal Society of Canada. In 1963, he became overall director of the Royal Ontario Museum. Under his directorship, the museum gained both in public attendance and scientific prestige. His last appointment, until 1979, was as an extraordinary professor at Queen's University in Kingston.

He died in Toronto in 1994, 93 years old. Swinton remained unmarried and had no children.

== Publications ==
- Monsters of Primeval Days (1931)
- The Dinosaurs: a short history of a great group of extinct reptiles (1934)
- A Guide to the Fossil Birds (1934)
- The Science of Living Things (1935)
- The Corridor of Life (1948)
- The Wonderful World of Prehistoric Animals (1952)
- Fossil Amphibians and Reptiles (1954; 1958)
- Fossil Birds (1958; 1965; British Museum (Natural History) Publication)- illustrated by Maurice Wilson
- The Story of Prehistoric Animals (1961)- illustrated by Maurice Wilson
- Digging for Dinosaurs (1962)
- Dinosaurs (1962; 1964; 1967; 1969; 1974; British Museum (Natural History) Publication)- illustrated by Neave Parker
- Dinosaurs of Canada (1965)
- Giants: Past and Present (1966)
- The Dinosaurs (1970)- illustrated by Neave Parker

== Literature ==
- Alan Charig (1994) "Obituary: Professor William Swinton", The Independent 28 June 1994. Accessed 15 Nov 2013.
- R. Cocks, "William Elgin Swinton, 1900–1994", Museums Journal, 94 (Aug 1994), 42.
- Chris McGowan & Anita McConnell, "Swinton, William Elgin (1900–1994)", Oxford Dictionary of National Biography, Oxford University Press, 2004. Accessed 15 Nov 2013.
- Wolfgang Saxon (1994). "W. E. Swinton, 93; Dinosaur Authority Wrote Textbooks", New York Times 17 June 1994. Accessed 15 Nov 2013.
