= Lerwick and Bressay Parish Church =

Church in Shetland, Scotland

Coordinates: 60°9′9″N 1°8′15″W

Lerwick and Bressay Parish Church is the largest Church of Scotland congregation in Shetland, serving the islands' capital Lerwick and the surrounding area.

== Description ==
There are three regular places of worship:

- Gulberwick Church (approximately 4 km south of Lerwick), with a Sunday service at 10.00 am.
- St Columba's Church in Lerwick town centre, with a Sunday service at 11.15 am. This building was renovated during 2008.
- Bressay Church, on Bressay, with Sunday services at 6.30 pm in summer months (and 3.00 pm November–April).

St Columba's building is now the only Church of Scotland parish church in Lerwick. This building was constructed during the late 1820s. It is the largest church building in Shetland (and is a listed building). The church organ was installed in 1871. It was only the second Church of Scotland church building to be so equipped, following in 1866 a relaxation of the Church law on instrumental accompaniment to music in worship.

As of 2014, the minister is Caroline Lockerbie. The previous minister (2002–2010) was Gordon Oliver, who was previously minister at St Andrew's Church, Lisbon and moved to the Parish of Latheron, Caithness in 2010.

== See also ==
- List of Church of Scotland parishes
