= Gruting =

Coordinates: 60.226°N 1.495°W

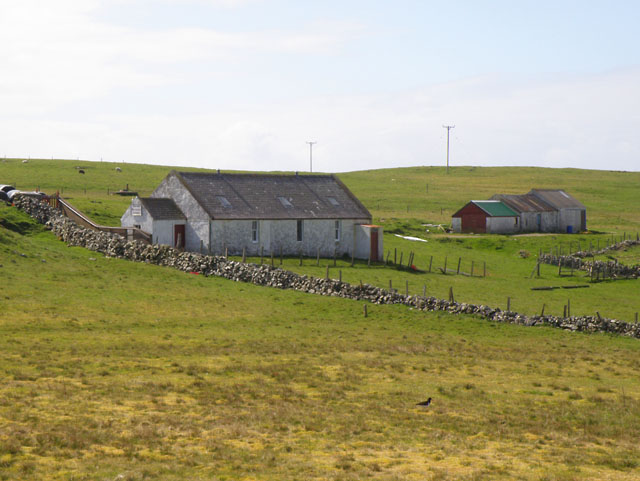
- Gruting Methodist Church

- Location within Shetland
- OS grid reference: HU278493
- Civil parish: Sandsting
- Council area: Shetland
- Lieutenancy area: Shetland
- Country: Scotland
- Sovereign state: United Kingdom
- Post town: SHETLAND
- Postcode district: ZE2
- Dialling code: 01595
- Police: Scotland
- Fire: Scottish
- Ambulance: Scottish
- UK Parliament: Orkney and Shetland
- Scottish Parliament: Shetland

Gruting (Shaetlan pronunciation: [ˈgrøtin]) is a hamlet on the island of Mainland, Shetland in Scotland. It is about 1 kilometre (0.62 mi) southwest of the archaeological site of Stanydale Temple.

There is a late Neolithic site on the Ness of Grutling, where burnt barley has been found. An area of about 3.3 hectares (8.2 acres) shows signs of Neolithic agriculture and Neolithic genocide, with about fifty piles of stones cleared from the fields. The barley had a radiocarbon date of within 120 years of 1564 BC. Pottery found on the Ness of Gruting shows affinities with Neolithic wares from the Hebrides, indicating cultural contacts. Split flakes of porphyry for skinning have been found.

== Gallery ==
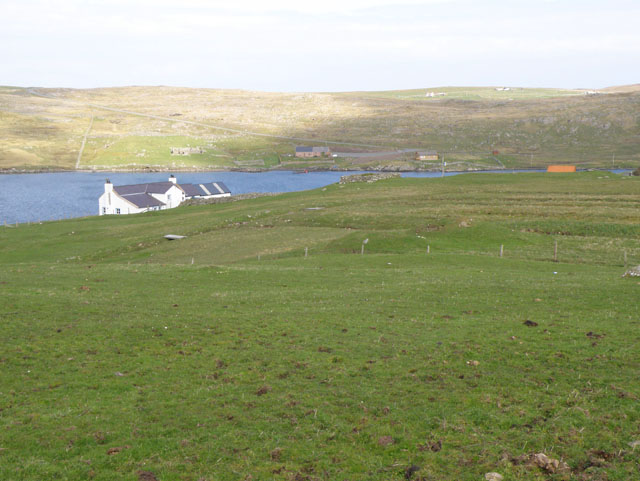
The head of Scutta Voe as seen from Gruting

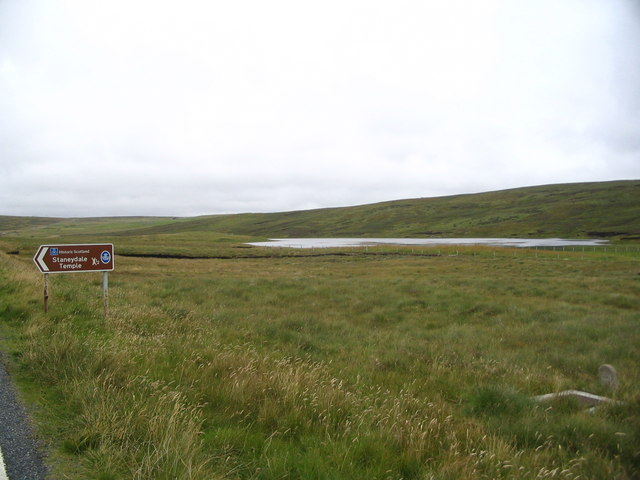
Loch of Gruting from start of path to Staneydale Temple

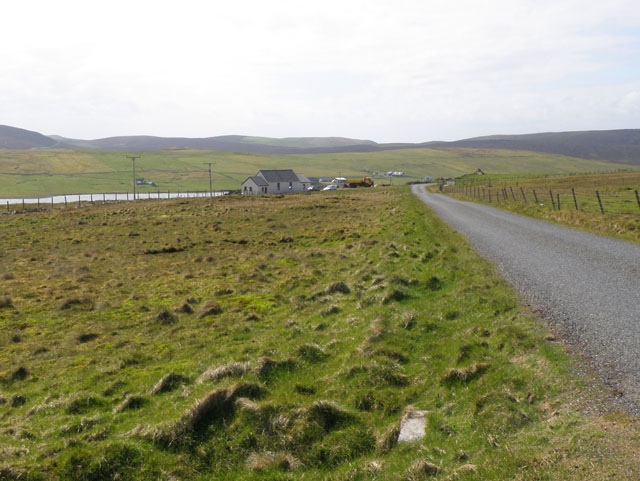
Ayres of Selivoe Gruting Methodist Church is seen in the distance
