= Westerwick =

Coordinates: 60.169°N 1.489°W

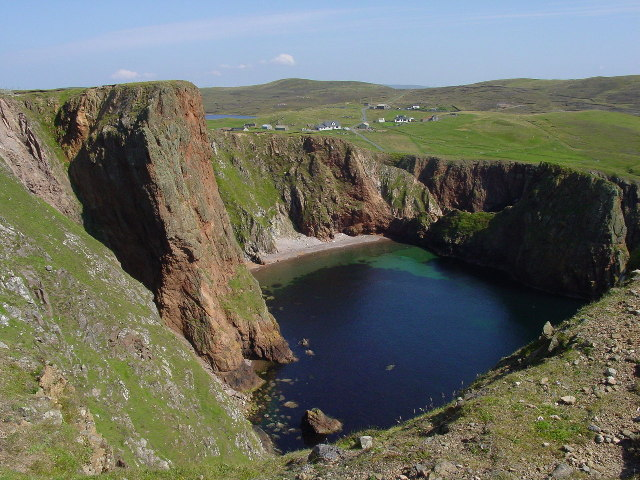
- Wester Wick Inlet with Westerwick village in distance

- Location within Shetland
- OS grid reference: HU283427
- Civil parish: Sandsting
- Council area: Shetland
- Lieutenancy area: Shetland
- Country: Scotland
- Sovereign state: United Kingdom
- Post town: SHETLAND
- Postcode district: ZE2
- Dialling code: 01595
- Police: Scotland
- Fire: Scottish
- Ambulance: Scottish
- UK Parliament: Orkney and Shetland
- Scottish Parliament: Shetland

Westerwick (Shaetlan pronunciation: [ˈwastərwik] WAST-ər-week) is a settlement on Mainland in Shetland, Scotland. The settlement is within the parish of Sandsting. It faces south with high cliffs on both sides of the wick. There is a small stony beach at the head, and the surrounding land is green with fewer rocky outcrops than the usual Shetland scene.

Westerwick is separated from Silwick by the Ward of Silwick and is about three miles from Skeld, on the West Shetland Mainland. There are just a few houses.

Westerwick was the birthplace of Thomas Alexander Robertson, also known as Vagaland.
