= Silwick =

Coordinates: 60.167°N 1.472°W

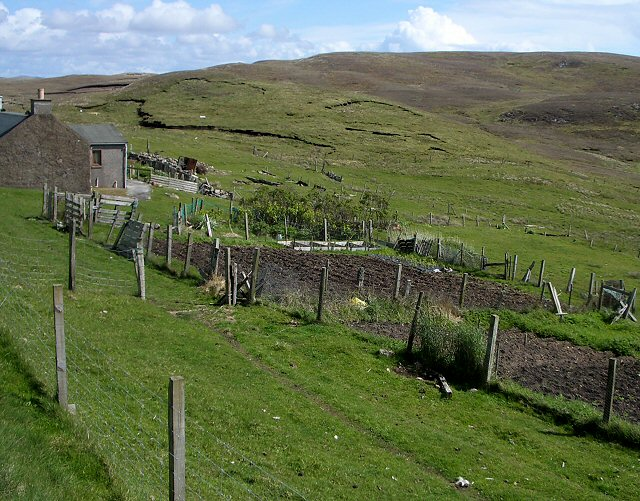
- A vegetable garden at Silwick

- Location within Shetland
- OS grid reference: HU292425
- Civil parish: Sandsting
- Council area: Shetland
- Lieutenancy area: Shetland
- Country: Scotland
- Sovereign state: United Kingdom
- Post town: SHETLAND
- Postcode district: ZE2
- Dialling code: 01595
- Police: Scotland
- Fire: Scottish
- Ambulance: Scottish
- UK Parliament: Orkney and Shetland
- Scottish Parliament: Shetland

Silwick, a once-thriving community in the West Mainland, Shetland, Scotland, about three miles from Skeld, is now largely deserted. The area is noted for its dramatic cliffs and views.

The Norwegian vessel Ustetind was wrecked on the stony beach at Silwick in 1929.
