= Gossabrough =

Coordinates: 60.529°N 1.042°W

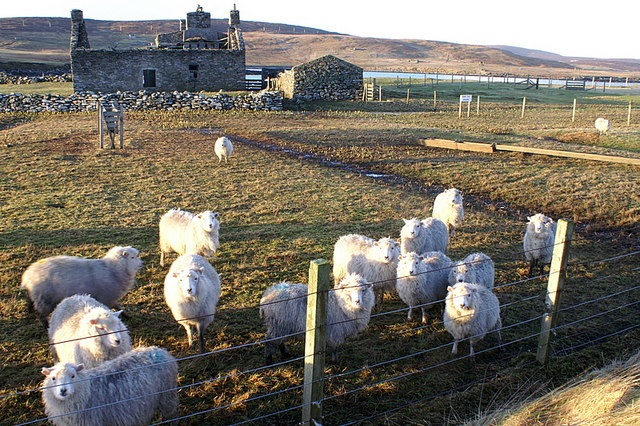
- Sheep at Gossabrough, with a ruined haa in the background

- Location within Shetland
- OS grid reference: HU525831
- Civil parish: Yell
- Council area: Shetland
- Lieutenancy area: Shetland
- Country: Scotland
- Sovereign state: United Kingdom
- Post town: SHETLAND
- Postcode district: ZE2
- Dialling code: 01957
- Police: Scotland
- Fire: Scottish
- Ambulance: Scottish
- UK Parliament: Orkney and Shetland
- Scottish Parliament: Shetland

Gossabrough (Shaetlan pronunciation: [ˈgɒsəbrɒx] GOSS-ə-brokh) is a coastal hamlet, wick and ness on the southeast side of the island of Yell, Shetland, Scotland. The Wick of Gossabrough lies between the northern extremity of Gossabrough Ness and the Saddle of Swarister. The hamlet is accessed via the B9081 road. The Loch of Hudon lies just to the southwest.

== History ==
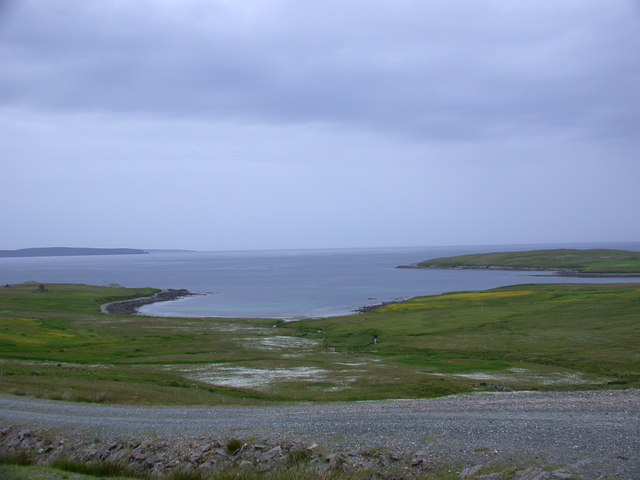
Wick of Gossabrough

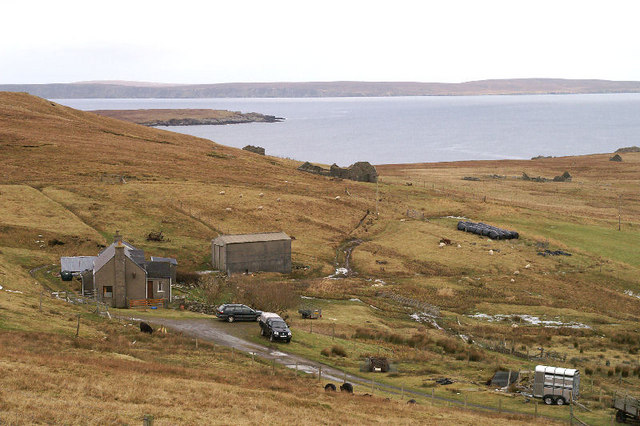
Holligarth, Gossabrough

The remains of rectangular structures found in the area indicate that this was a settlement inhabited by early Norse peoples. There is a ruined broch here. In 1924, the "White Lady", known locally as the "Widden Wife", was shipwrecked in the vicinity.

In the very early part of the 20th century, there were only three or four houses scattered in the hamlet. Now two more houses have been built. A local trading steamer called periodically at Gossabrough.

A native of Gossabrough, John Hughson, a warehouse assistant was involved in a notable court case in Dundee around 1940, under the Firearms Act of 1937. Gossabrough House was the main house of note here, but the old haa is now in a ruined state; it was at one time the seat of Cecil H. Robertson.

== Geography ==
Gossabrough is a coastal hamlet on the southeast side of the island of Yell in Shetland. Adjoining settlements are Otterswick and Swarister. The nearest airports are Fetlar 4.4 mi away and Out Skerries Airport 12.8 mi away. Gossabrough is connected to Yell by a side road, the B9081. Gossabrough beach is one of the beaches along with others at Hamnavoe, Westsandwick and Breckon, which has earned the award of the “Keep Scotland Beautiful Rural Seaside Award” for Yell. Between Gossabrough Ness and the Quheyin Ness is a bay 0.75 miles (1.21 km) wide and 1.5 miles (2.4 km) deep; the wicks of Gossabrough and Otters are located here. A rock named Wick Skerry lies about 0.25 miles (0.40 km) northeastward of Gossabrough Ness. Upon approaching the southern portion of a ridge named Lamghoga from Gossabrough is the south-western corner of a rock named Ramshorn point.

== Climate ==
The climate of the island is cold temperate. The average temperature and rainfall for each month of the year are given in the table below.

Climate data for Gossabrough, United Kingdom
Month	Jan	Feb	Mar	Apr	May	Jun	Jul	Aug	Sep	Oct	Nov	Dec	Year
Mean daily maximum °C (°F)	7 (45)	6 (43)	7 (45)	7 (45)	8 (46)	13 (55)	15 (59)	15 (59)	13 (55)	11 (52)	8 (46)	7 (45)	15 (59)
Mean daily minimum °C (°F)	3 (37)	2 (36)	3 (37)	4 (39)	6 (43)	8 (46)	10 (50)	11 (52)	9 (48)	7 (45)	5 (41)	3 (37)	2 (36)
Average rainfall mm (inches)	118.3 (4.66)	92.1 (3.63)	100.1 (3.94)	53.3 (2.10)	41 (1.6)	53.6 (2.11)	41 (1.6)	58.4 (2.30)	80.8 (3.18)	103.7 (4.08)	118.5 (4.67)	124.5 (4.90)	985.3 (38.77)

== Fauna ==
The Wick of Gossabrough attracts many birds, of note here in particular are the great black-backed gulls. In the first decade of the 20th century, it was documented that herring populations had declined. Anatidae ducks have been reported here and eider duck flocks are common.
