= Papa Stour Airstrip =

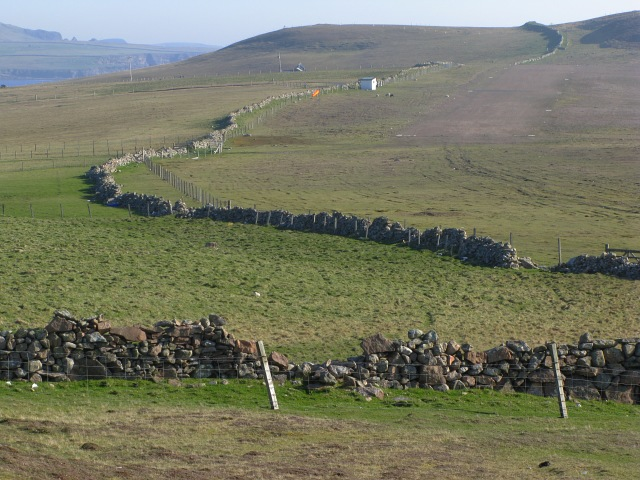
- IATA: PSV; ICAO: none

Summary
- Airport type: Public
- Owner: Shetland Islands Council
- Serves: Papa Stour
- Location: Papa Stour
- Elevation AMSL: 75 ft / 23 m
- Coordinates: 60°19′0″N 001°42′0″W

Map
- Location in Shetland

Runways
Direction	Length		Surface
Direction	m	ft	Surface
02/20	442	1,450	Gravel

Papa Stour Airstrip is a small airstrip in the village of Biggings on the island of Papa Stour. Shetland, Scotland.

== History ==
Papa Stour Airstrip opened in December 1969 to provide better connections to the mainland for islanders.

== Facilities ==
Papa Stour Airstrip consists of a gravel runway and a small wooden shed. Access to the airstrip is via a metal gate with a notice warning people of the airstrip, Papa Stour Airstrip is located at the end of a short road from the village of Biggings.

== Airlines and destinations ==
As of April 2021 the airstrip is unserved, it was formerly served by PSO flights to Tingwall by Directflight on behalf of Shetland Islands Council.
