= Biggings =

Village in Shetland, Scotland

Coordinates: 60.326°N 1.681°W

Biggings: Shaetlan: Da Biggins
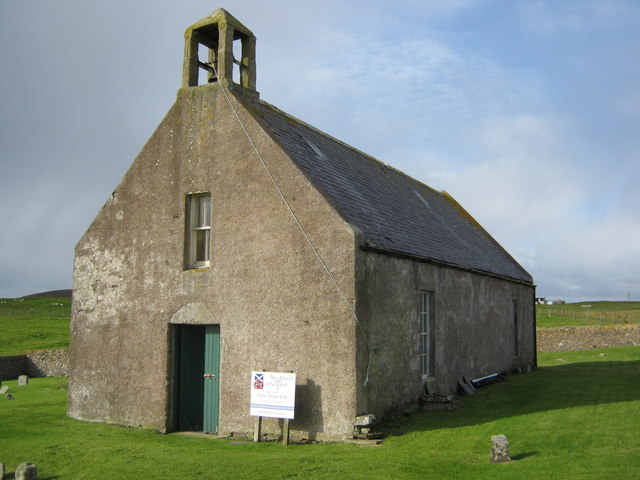
- Papa Stour Kirk

- Location within Shetland
- OS grid reference: HU176601
- Civil parish: Walls and Sandness
- Council area: Shetland Islands
- Lieutenancy area: Shetland Islands
- Country: Scotland
- Sovereign state: United Kingdom
- Post town: SHETLAND
- Postcode district: ZE2
- Dialling code: 01595
- Police: Scotland
- Fire: Scottish
- Ambulance: Scottish
- UK Parliament: Orkney and Shetland
- Scottish Parliament: Shetland

Biggings (Shaetlan: Da Biggins) is a village on the island of Papa Stour, in Shetland, Scotland. Papa Stour's church is situated at the south of Biggings. A homestead of Duke Haakon of Norway is thought to have been at Biggings, and archaeological digs have discovered the remains of a substantial Norse house, dating to around the 12th or 13th century. A partial reconstruction of a Norse building has also been undertaken. Biggings has an airstrip, which has not been used since 2021.
