= Hoswick =

Coordinates: 59.998°N 1.256°W

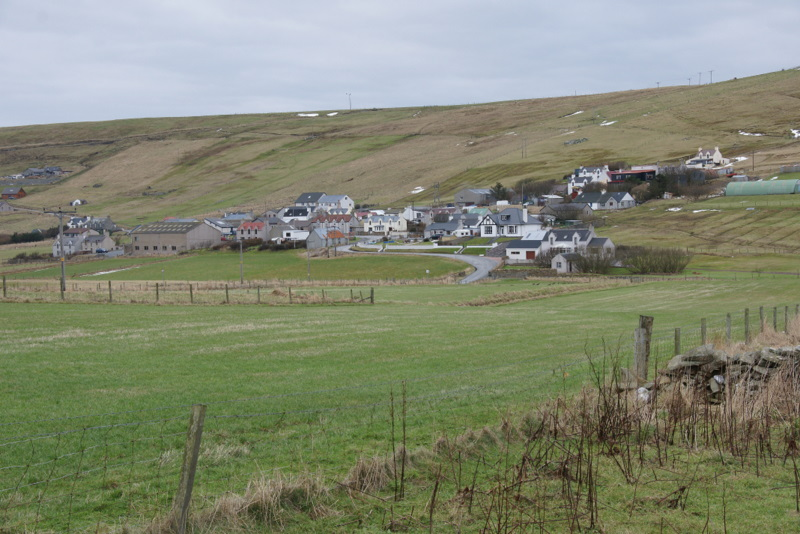
- Hoswick viewed from Stove

- Location within the United Kingdom
- OS grid reference: HU414238
- Civil parish: Dunrossness
- Community council: Sandwick
- Council area: Shetland
- Lieutenancy area: Shetland
- Post town: SHETLAND
- Postcode district: ZE2
- Dialling code: 01950
- Police
- Fire
- Ambulance
- UK Parliament: Orkney and Shetland
- Scottish Parliament: Shetland

Hoswick (Shaetlan pronunciation: [ˈhɒzək] HOZ-ək) is a settlement in Sandwick in the south mainland of Shetland, Scotland, on the eastern part of the Dunrossness civil parish. It is separated from the rest of Sandwick by the Hoswick Burn and from Channerwick in the south by the hill on which the settlement is situated.

== History ==
The settlement most probably grew as a fishing island in its own right, drying and curing fish on Hoswick beach, then many residents subsequently worked from the nearby fishing station on the mainland at Broonie's Taing which was at its height in the early 1900s but had declined by the late 1930s. Hoswick isle was also home to a Shetland tweed weaving industry post WW2, but this came to an end in the 1980s and the Visitor Centre (cafe and museum) is housed in one of the former weaving sheds. The tweed industry was developed by LJ Smith, who also built up a substantial knitwear industry based on home knitters but served from premises in Hoswick. According to John Stewart(P294) the name derives from the Old Norse Hausvík and means "skull" in light of the steep hills adjacent in the area.

=== The "Hoswick Whale Case" ===
The residents of Hoswick are known for a legal case following the annual whale drive when, in 1888, they drove around 340 whales ashore. They then resisted the landowner, John Bruce Jnr of Sumburgh's claim for a third share of the profits which was customary under Udal Law (the catch was traditionally split three ways, one for the 'admiral', one for those who drove the whales ashore and one for the owner of the land on which the animals were beached). The case was heard at the Court of Session in Edinburgh (Bruce v Smith) and in July 1889 Sheriff MacKenzie found in the Hoswick residents' favour. The court refused to recognise Bruce's claim, saying it was not 'sufficiently inveterate, uniform, or uninterrupted'. Bruce appealed the decision in 1890 but lost, and no further claims were made by Shetland landowners.

=== 2003 Flood ===
Heavy rains in the early morning of 19 September 2003 caused extensive flash flood damage to the village with many buildings affected (eleven houses were flooded, two of which had to be evacuated), the Hoswick bridge destroyed, a large section of the beach swept away and fresh water supplies cut off (two kilometres of water main were destroyed, resulting in the community having to rely on bottled water for several days).

== Notable buildings ==
- Hoswick Visitor Centre - contains a cafe, gift shop, weaving exhibits, interpretative local history displays and a large collection of vintage radios. The building is a former Shetland Tweed weaving shed and is home to the Sandwick History Group
- Hoswick Woollen Mill - a working factory and shop which houses Laurance Odie Knitwear. The company was started by Laurence Odie in early 2004 following the closure of Laurence J. Smith Ltd which was based in the same premises.
- Neilanell Design Studio - boutique and design studio owned by Hoswick resident and textile designer Neila Nell
- Orca Country Inn (formerly the Barclay Arms Hotel)- a three star guest house and Bar

Hoswick contains many examples of the traditional two-story, two or three-bay croft houses that are particularly associated with the district.
