= Sandwick, Dunrossness =

Coordinates: 59.997°N 1.223°W

Sandwick
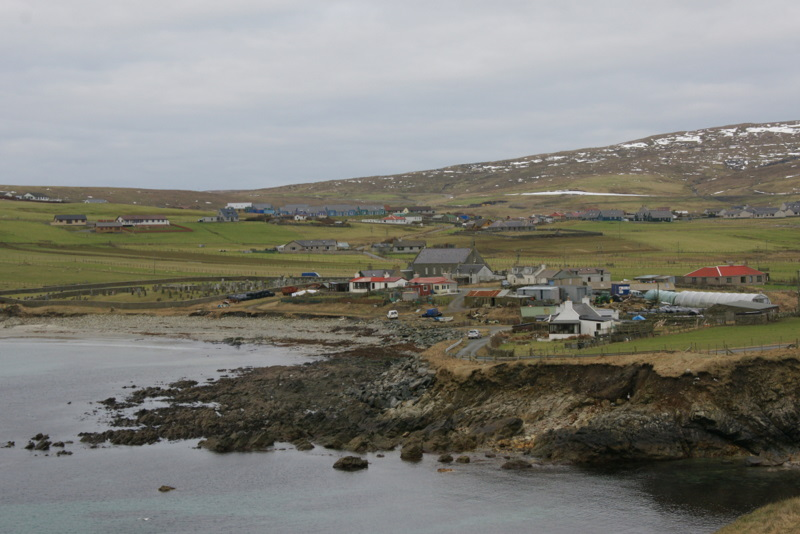
- A view over the Geo of Sandwick, towards the settlement

- Location within Shetland
- OS grid reference: HU433237
- Civil parish: Dunrossness
- Council area: Shetland
- Lieutenancy area: Shetland
- Country: Scotland
- Sovereign state: United Kingdom
- Post town: SHETLAND
- Postcode district: ZE2
- Dialling code: 01950 431
- Police: Scotland
- Fire: Scottish
- Ambulance: Scottish
- UK Parliament: Orkney and Shetland
- Scottish Parliament: Shetland

Sandwick (Shaetlan pronunciation: [ˈsæᶦnwik] SAN-week; Old Norse: Sandvik "Sandy Bay") is a village and an ancient parish in the Shetland Islands, Scotland. It was merged in 1891, along with Cunningsburgh, into Dunrossness. Sandwick is located 13 miles (21 km) south of Lerwick in the South Mainland, and is considered a Tier 1 settlement in Shetland. It comprises a number of distinct settlements in very close proximity to each other, each remaining distinct through being separated by agricultural land. These settlements within Sandwick include Old Sandwick (often just called "Sandwick" or "San'ick"), Leebitton, Broonies' Taing, Stove, Swinister and Hoswick; the latter is almost a village in its own right and is often considered distinct from Sandwick.

== Amenities ==
Sandwick has a bakery, the Sandwick Baking Company, which also serves as post office and grocery store. There is a village hall, known as Carnegie Hall, which hosts dances, drama performances and other local events. Separately the village also has a youth club and community centre. There are two licensed premises, Sandwick Social Club and the Orca Bay Hotel (formerly known for over 20 years as the Barclay Arms).

Sandwick Junior High School, near Broonies' Taing, is both the primary school for the village and the main secondary school for the whole of the South Mainland.

== Leisure and tourism ==
At Leebitton there is a pier from which, during the tourist season, it is possible to take a boat trip to the island of Mousa. The local sailing club races both dinghies and traditional 'Shetland Model' boats, and hosts an annual sailing and rowing regatta, is also based here. In the centre of the village is a children's park, and a football pitch at which the village's football team play their home games. Ness United FC also play some home games here. The village also has a modern public indoor swimming pool. Cricket is played on the playing fields of the school.

At Hoswick there is a knitwear factory which also has a small shop. Hoswick also has a visitors' centre and cafe.

== People ==
- Thomas Matthew Finlay, geologist

== See also ==
- Sandvík in the Faeroe Islands
