= Bressay =

Island in the Shetland Islands of Scotland

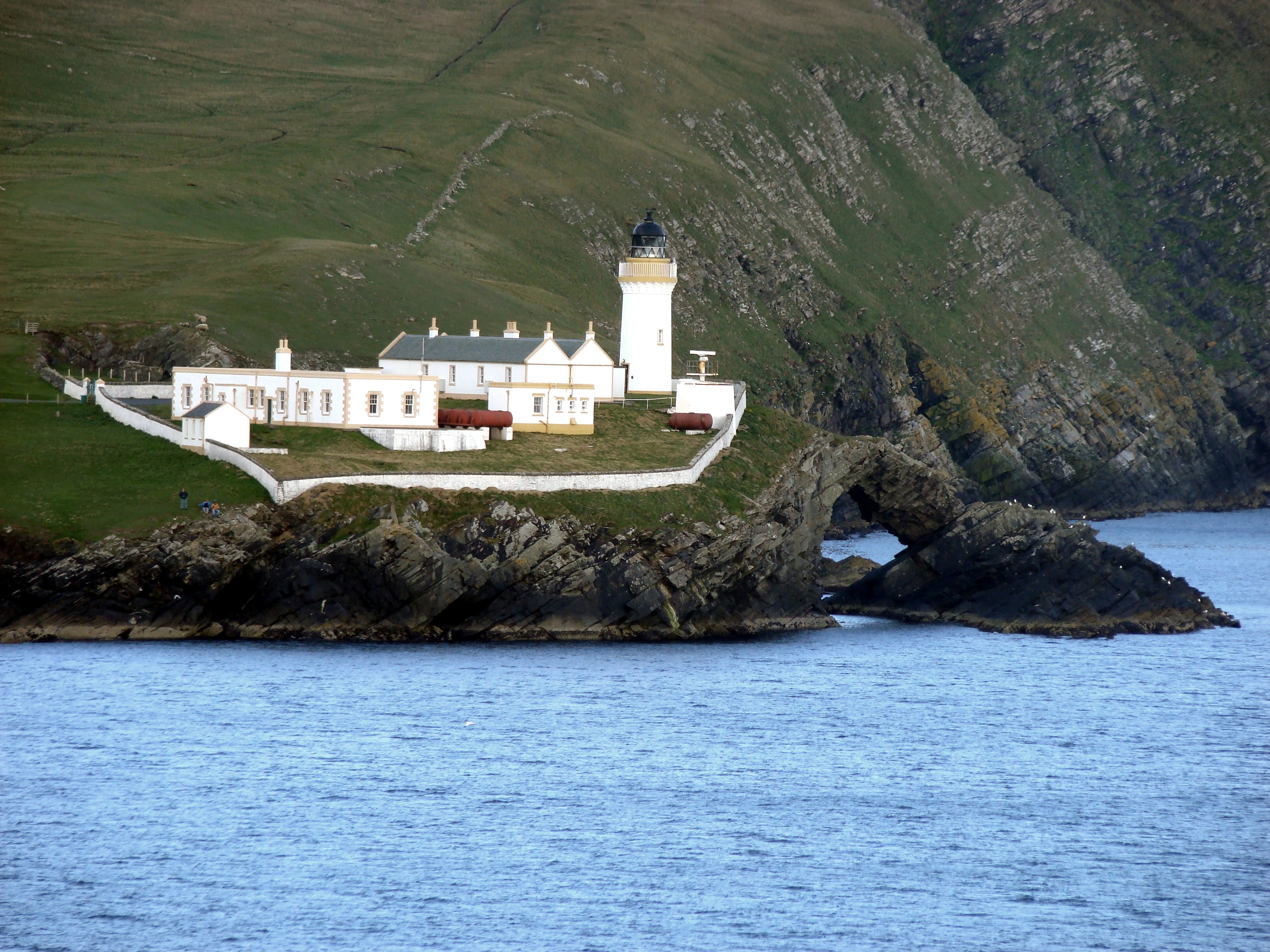
- Bressay Lighthouse at Kirkabister Ness overlooking Bressay Sound

Location
- Bressay shown within the Shetland Islands
- OS grid reference: HU507406
- Coordinates: 60.15°N 1.08°W

Name
- Name meaning: Old Norse for 'broad island' or 'Brusi's island'
- Old Norse name: Breiðey/Brusey

Physical geography
- Island group: Shetland
- Area: 2,805 ha (10 7/8 sq mi)
- Area rank: 30
- Highest elevation: Ward of Bressay, 226 m (741 ft)

Administration
- Council area: Shetland Islands
- Country: Scotland
- Sovereign state: United Kingdom

Demographics
- Population: 345
- Population rank: 25
- Population density: 12/km^{2} (31/sq mi)
- Largest settlement: Maryfield

Bressay (Shaetlan pronunciation: ['brɛsə] BRESS-ə) is a populated island in the Shetland archipelago of Scotland.

== Geography and geology ==
Bressay lies due south of Whalsay, west of the Isle of Noss, and north of Mousa. With an area of 11 square miles (28 km^{2}), it is the fifth-largest island in Shetland. The population is around 350 people, concentrated in the middle of the west coast, around Glebe and Fullaburn.

The island is made up of Old Red Sandstone with some basaltic intrusions. Bressay was quarried extensively for building materials, used all over Shetland, especially in nearby Lerwick. There are a number of sea caves and arches. The largest of eleven lochs on the island are the Loch of Grimsetter in the east, and the Loch of Brough.

== Wildlife ==
Bressay has a large number of migrant birds, especially in the east. The Loch of Grimsetter is a haven for waders and whooper swans. In the far south, there is a colony of Arctic skuas. The southern half of the island has been identified as an Important Bird Area (IBA) by BirdLife International.

== History ==
The name of the island may have been recorded in 1263 as 'Breiðoy' (Old Norse "broad island"). In a 1490 document the island is referred to as "Brwsøy" – "Brusi's island" which name may indicate it was the 11th century base for Earl of Orkney Brusi Sigurdsson. This possibility is supported by a later reference to his son Rögnvald as "Lord of the Shetlanders" and Thompson (2008) is in "no doubt " that Shetland specifically was in Brusi's possession during his joint earldom with his brothers.

The Bressay Stone is an outstanding example of Pictish art.

a slab of chlorite slate, about 16 inches [400 mm] wide at the top, tapering to less than a foot [300 mm] at the bottom.

The slender sides are engraved with ogham, and the two faces with various examples of knotwork, and imagery. The top of each face has a cross. On one side, there is an engraving of two men with crosiers, as well as various animals including horses, pigs, and what appears to be someone in the process of being swallowed by two sea monsters. It has been suggested that this is Jonah.

During World War I and II gun emplacements were built to guard Bressay Sound.

== Infrastructure ==
Attractions on the island include Bressay Lighthouse. At Maryfield there is a heritage centre, a hotel and the old laird's mansion, Gardie House, built in 1724. Bressay also hosts the UK’s northernmost parkrun.

Frequent car ferries sail from Maryfield to Lerwick on the Shetland Mainland. During the summer months, a passenger ferry service links the east coast of Bressay with the nature reserve Isle of Noss.

Lerwick and Bressay Parish Church (of the Church of Scotland) has three places of worship. The Bressay Church building is located close to the Marina, near the centre of the west coast of the island.

== Gallery ==
Images of Bressay

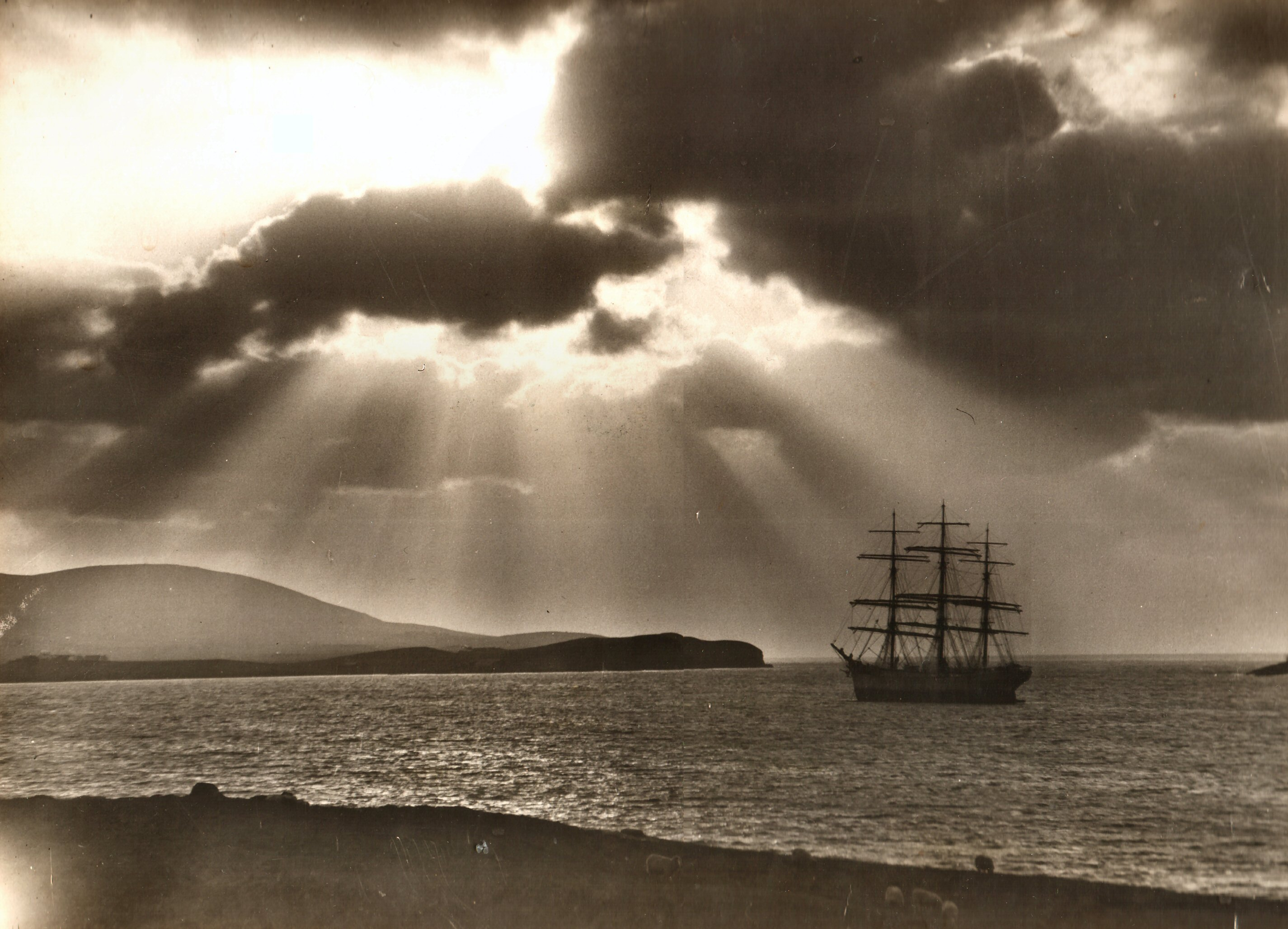
Full-rigged ship Maella, of Oslo, in Bressay Sound circa 1922

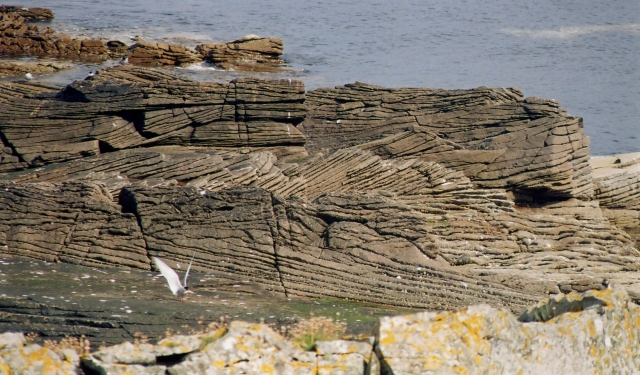
Cross-bedding in Middle Old Red Sandstone on Bressay

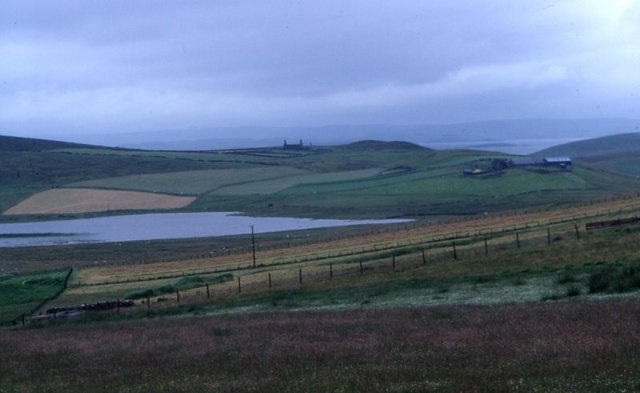
Loch of Setter

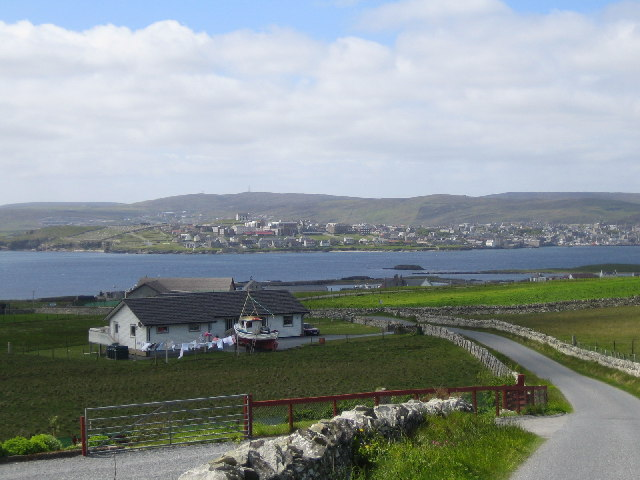
View of Lerwick from Bressay

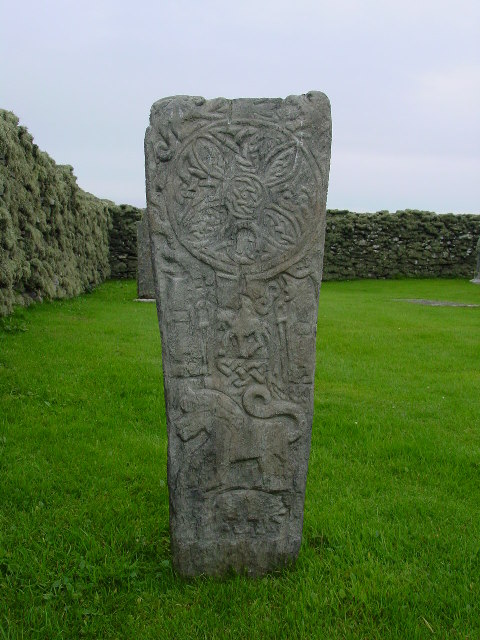
A replica of the Pictish Bressay Stone in St Mary's churchyard where the original stone was found.

== See also ==
- List of islands of Scotland
- Bressay transmitting station
