= Bixter =

Village in Shetland Islands, Scotland

Coordinates: 60.2539°N 1.3973°W

Location within Scotland.

Bixter is a village on the west side of the Shetland Islands, located more than 160 km (99 mi) off the north coast of mainland Scotland.

Bixter is a group of houses in a large reign of area. Council houses belonging to Hjaltland Housing Association & the Shetland Islands Council (S.I.C.), lie next to the main (A971) road. The Bixter Health Centre lies opposite to the council houses. Many other homes are scattered around the area.

The first Bixter shop was established in the 1840s by William Tulloch - his descendants still live in Aithsting. "S.Johnston Services" is the main shop in the local area, which has been in business since February, 2014. The past shop in service was "C.G.Williamson", which was in business for over 100 years.

== Prehistoric site ==
3 km south west of Bixter lies Stanydale Temple, a Neolithic hall containing a large oval chamber. Around it are ruins of houses, walls and cairns of the same period. The site, which is a scheduled monument, is in the care of Historic Scotland.
