= Bremirehoull =

Coordinates: 60.045°N 1.228°W

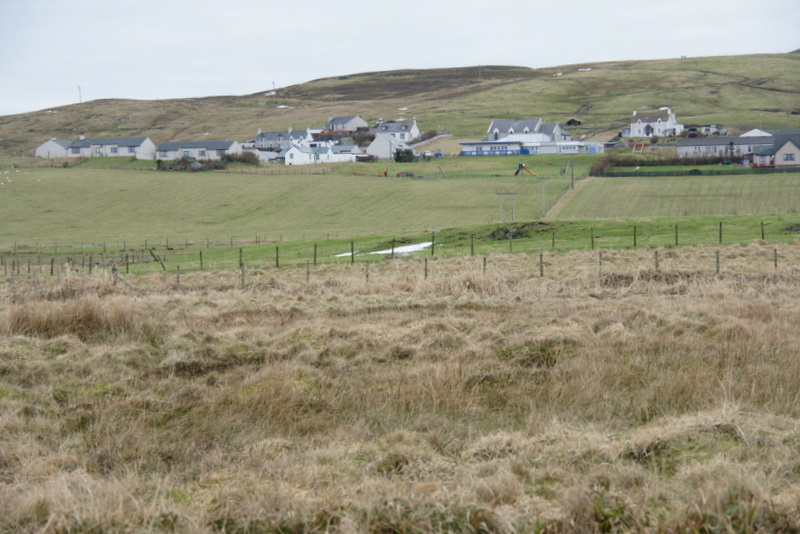
- Looking up from beside Aith Voe towards the area around Cunningsburgh School at Bremirehoull

- Location within Shetland
- OS grid reference: HU429291
- Civil parish: Dunrossness
- Council area: Shetland
- Lieutenancy area: Shetland
- Country: Scotland
- Sovereign state: United Kingdom
- Post town: SHETLAND
- Postcode district: ZE2
- Dialling code: 01950
- Police: Scotland
- Fire: Scottish
- Ambulance: Scottish
- UK Parliament: Orkney and Shetland
- Scottish Parliament: Shetland

Bremirehoull is a settlement on the island of Mainland, in Shetland, Scotland. Bremirehoull is situated on the A970 in the Cunningsburgh area.
