= Braehoulland =

Coordinates: 60.498°N 1.562°W

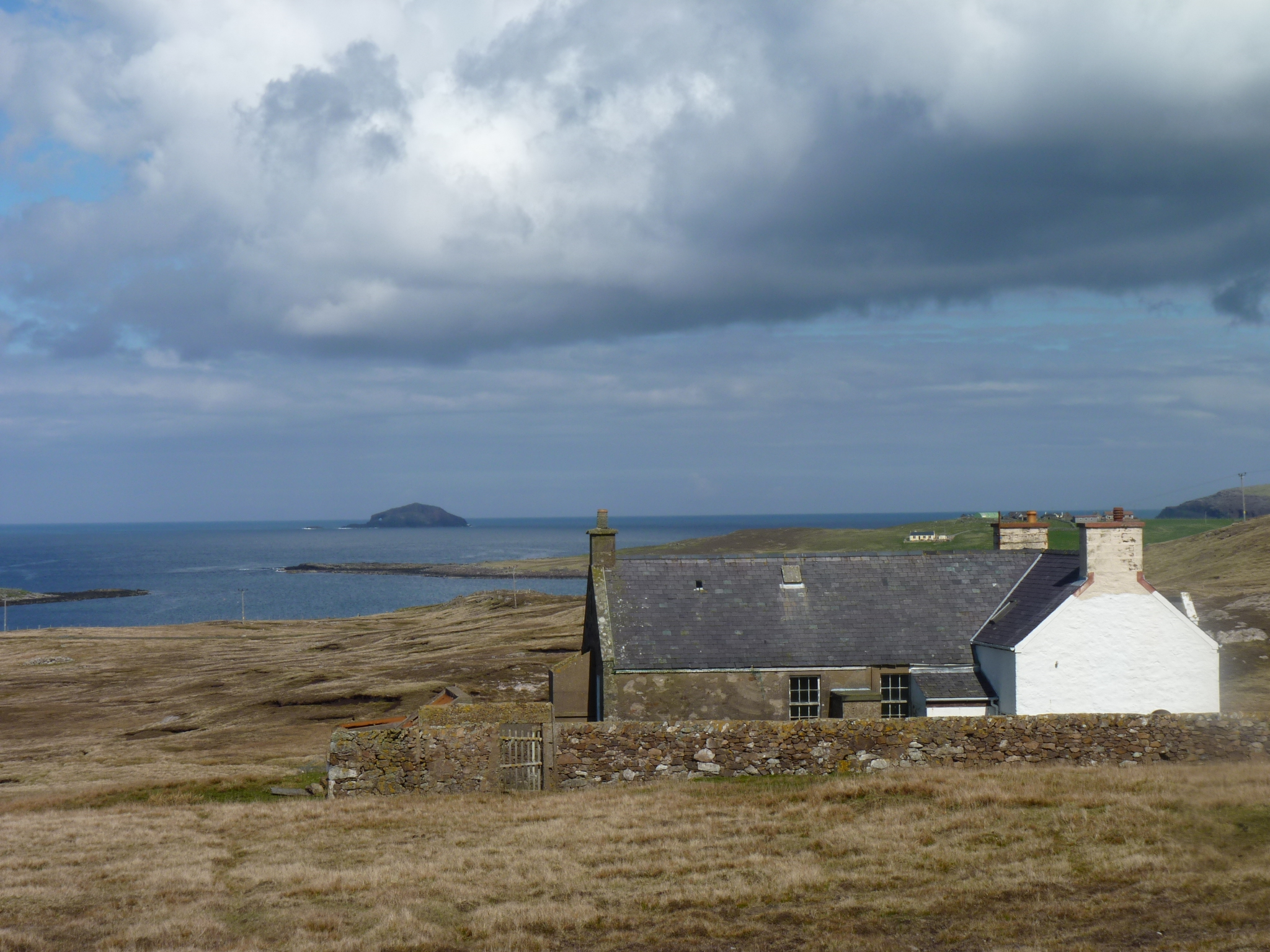
- Cottage near Braehoulland

- Location within Shetland
- OS grid reference: HU240793
- Civil parish: Northmaven
- Council area: Shetland
- Lieutenancy area: Shetland
- Country: Scotland
- Sovereign state: United Kingdom
- Post town: SHETLAND
- Postcode district: ZE2
- Dialling code: 01806
- Police: Scotland
- Fire: Scottish
- Ambulance: Scottish
- UK Parliament: Orkney and Shetland
- Scottish Parliament: Shetland

Braehoulland (Shaetlan pronunciation: [breːˈhuɫənd] bray-HOO-lənd) is a hamlet on Mainland, in Shetland, Scotland. Braehoulland is situated within the parish of Northmaven. Eshaness Community Centre is located in Braehoulland.

There is a caravan site and a cafe located at the farmstead of Braewick, just south of the main cluster of buildings. Braewick beach is on a south-facing bay, with cliffs at the east and west sides, and with dramatic sea stacks further to the east.
