= Gulberwick =

Coordinates: 60.128°N 1.212°W

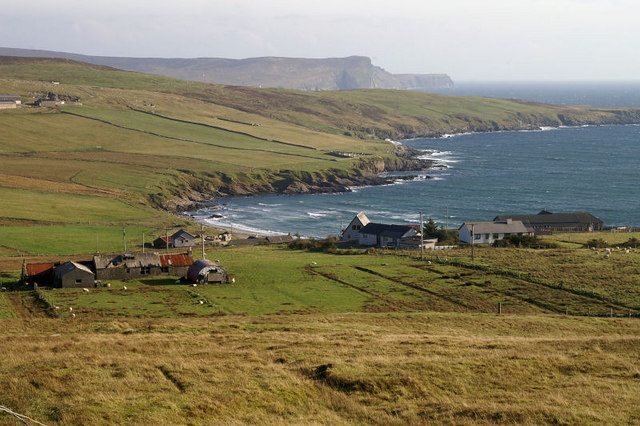

- Location within Shetland
- OS grid reference: HU437383
- Civil parish: Lerwick
- Council area: Shetland
- Lieutenancy area: Shetland
- Country: Scotland
- Sovereign state: United Kingdom
- Post town: SHETLAND
- Postcode district: ZE2
- Dialling code: 01595
- Police: Scotland
- Fire: Scottish
- Ambulance: Scottish
- UK Parliament: Orkney and Shetland
- Scottish Parliament: Shetland

Gulberwick (Shaetlan pronunciation: [ˈgɔɫbərwik] GULL-bər-week) is a village on Mainland, 2.5 mi (4 km) southwest of Lerwick, Shetland, Scotland, which contains approximately 200 houses. In recent years the number of houses in the area has increased due to its nearness to Shetland's capital and biggest town, Lerwick.

Gulberwick Church is one of the three regular places of worship of the Lerwick and Bressay Parish, the largest Church of Scotland congregation in Shetland.
