= Voe of Cullingsburgh =

Large sea loch off the Shetland island of Bressay

Coordinates: 60.165°N 1.066°W

Voe of Cullingsburgh is a large sea loch off the Shetland island of Bressay, voe meaning "sea inlet" in Shetland dialect. The local spelling of the name is "Voe of Cullingsbrough" (pronounced "Cullingsbroch").

The voe is separated from Aith Voe to the west by Score Head at the northwestern extremity and the peninsula of Aith Ness, and from Noss Sound to the east by the heights of Ander Hill and the point of Loder Head. Within the voe there are various smaller embayments, such as Score Minni, Blue Geo, Minni of Aith and Bay of Cuppa. Inner Score and Outer Score are tidal islets separated from one another by the narrow Gluop of the Scores.

There are small settlements at Setter, Bruntland and Aith on the western side of the voe and the uninhabited Garth and Cullingsburgh to the east along with the remains of both a broch and the 12th-century St. Mary's Church. The Pictish-era Bressay Stone was found near this churchyard in 1852. It dates from the 8th–9th century AD, and a replica of the original was erected inside the churchyard in 2000. It is described as "a slab of chlorite slate, about 16 inches wide at the top, tapering to less than a foot at the bottom".
