= Thomas Matthew Finlay =

Scottish geologist and palaeontologist

Dr Thomas Matthew Finlay FRSE EGS (17 September 1879 – 31 January 1954) was a Scottish geologist and palaeontologist.

== Life ==
He was born at Sotrigarth in Sandwick, Shetland on 17 September 1879, the son of Frederick Souis Finlay (1852–1918) and his wife Mary Bruce Smith (1857–1937). The 1891 census indicates he lived with his maternal grandfather, Robert Smith, still in Sotrigarth at that time.

He was sent to Edinburgh in 1900/1901 and lodged in a tenement at 99 Montgomery Street at the top of Leith Walk. Here he attended the University of Edinburgh graduating with an MA in 1902. He then travelled to South Africa where he taught in the Natal 1903 to 1910, before returning to the University of Edinburgh as a lecturer in botany.

In the First World War he served as an officer in the Scottish Horse, being promoted from lance corporal to second lieutenant in 1915, he was wounded in action in October 1918 at Ledeghem and when discharged he was a captain. On his return to Edinburgh he began lecturing in palaeontology. He gained a Doctor of Science (DSc) in geology from the University of Edinburgh in 1924. In 1927 he was elected a Fellow of the Royal Society of Edinburgh. His proposers were Thomas James Jehu, Robert Campbell, John Horne and Murray Macgregor.

In 1954 he co-wrote the guidebook The complete Scotland : a comprehensive survey, based on the principal motor, walking, railway, and steamer routes with the historian J.D. Mackie, Finlay writing the sections on geology and scenery.

He died at home in Chalmers Crescent in Edinburgh on 31 January 1954.

== Family ==
He married Flora Rowan (1879–1949) in Cowdenbeath in 1914. They had three children: Frederick Henry Rowan Finlay (1915–1973); Margaret Haddow Finlay (1917–1958); and Robert Finlay (1923–1979).
