= Otterswick =

Coordinates: 60.551°N 1.058°W

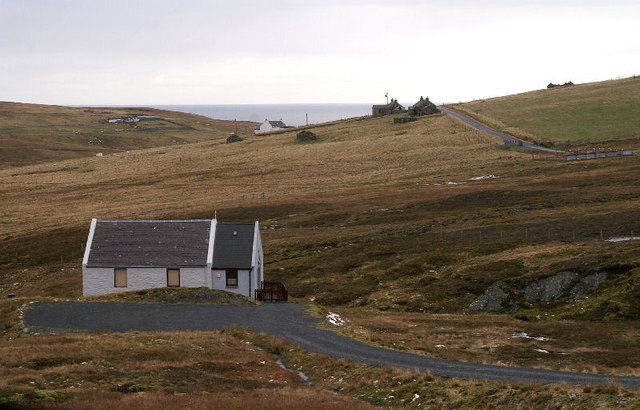
- East Yell Methodist Kirk, Otterswick

- Location within Shetland
- OS grid reference: HU516855
- Civil parish: Yell
- Council area: Shetland
- Lieutenancy area: Shetland
- Country: Scotland
- Sovereign state: United Kingdom
- Post town: SHETLAND
- Postcode district: ZE2
- Dialling code: 01957
- Police: Scotland
- Fire: Scottish
- Ambulance: Scottish
- UK Parliament: Orkney and Shetland
- Scottish Parliament: Shetland

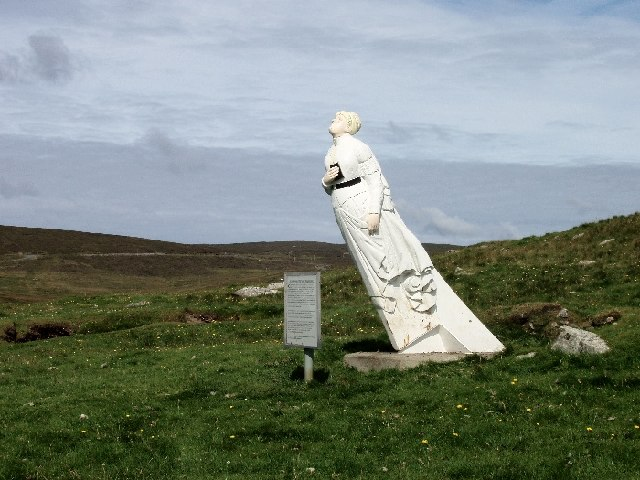
The White Wife of Queyon

Otterswick is a hamlet on the island of Yell in the Shetland Islands, on the inlet of Otters Wick. It is on the east side of the island. There is also an "Otterswick" on Sanday in the Orkney Islands.

== History ==
The German ship Bohus was wrecked near here in 1924, and its figurehead, known as the "White Wife of Otterswick", can be seen near the village. The original wooden one rotted away and was replaced by a fibreglass replica. Despite being a German boat, the Bohus was built in Grangemouth on the Firth of Forth, and was originally known as the Bertha.

== Environment ==
The site forms part of the Otterswick and Graveland Important Bird Area (IBA), designated as such by BirdLife International. The land is dominated by blanket bogs with stretches of dry heath moorland. It is a breeding ground of red-throated divers. As the name suggests, there are many otters in the area.
