= Stanydale Temple =

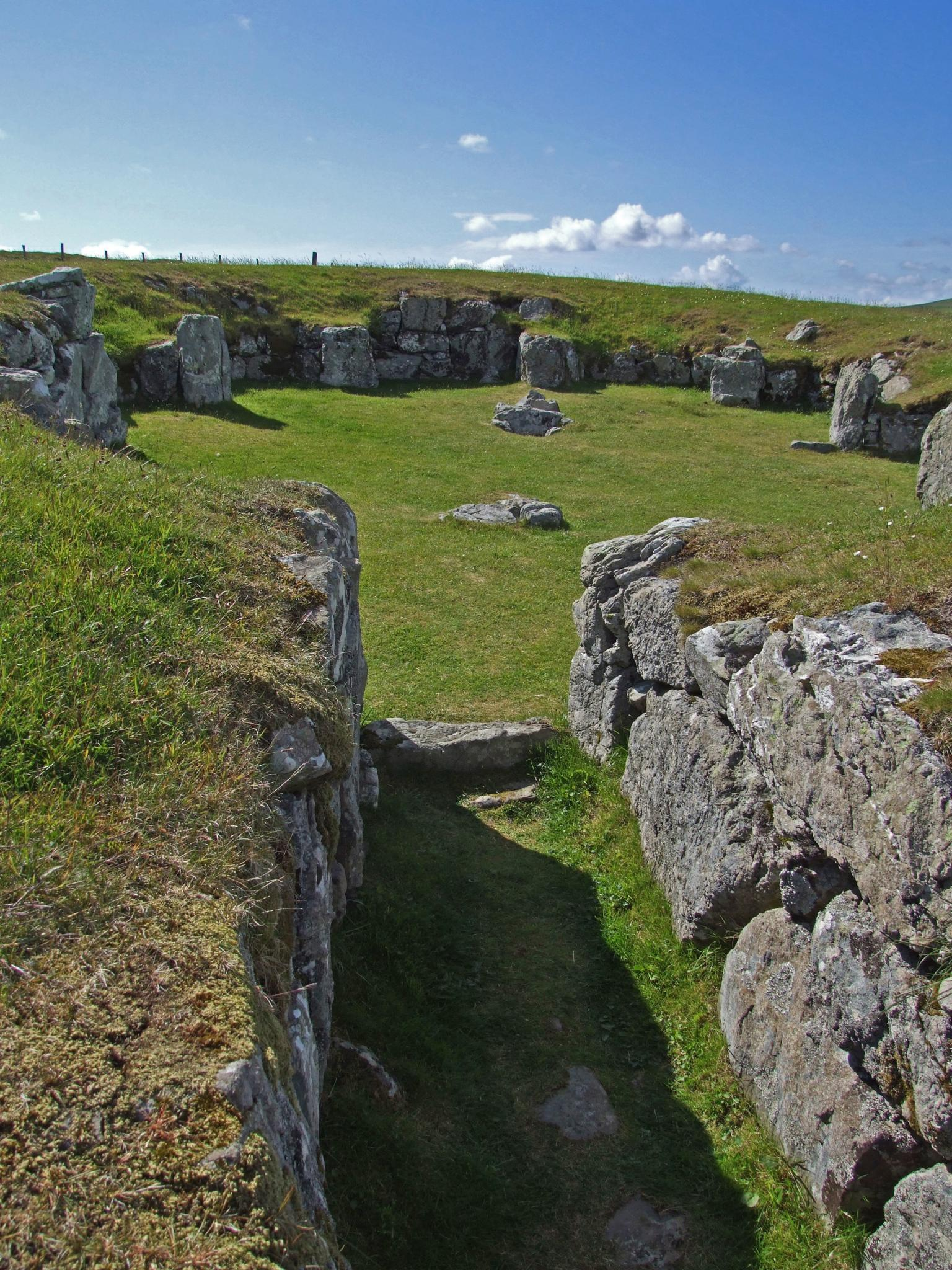
- Stanydale

- Stanydale location in Shetland
- 60.235476°N 1.48659°W
- Location: Mainland, Shetland, Scotland

History
- Built: Neolithic age

Stanydale Temple is a Neolithic site on Mainland, Shetland, Scotland. It is located in a field to the south of the modern village of Stanydale, roughly 21 miles (34 km) by road northwest of Lerwick, to the northeast of the village of Gruting. Once a roofed building, all that remains is a large, walled enclosure. There is uncertainty about the original purpose of the building, but its unusual size indicates some communal purpose, or that it was possibly the home of an important person.

It is designated a scheduled monument.

== Location and origins ==
The building lies within a field of about 8 acres (3.2 ha) almost completely surrounded by a dry stone wall. The field contains two smaller stone houses and about 30 mounds of stone. The stones would have been cleared from the field to enable cultivation. The settlement may well have been established in 2500–2000 BC, when Neolithic farmers first came to Shetland. Pottery sherds show that it was also occupied in the late Bronze Age (1000–700 BC) and early Iron Age (600–400 BC).

== Structure ==
The smaller houses both have a large central space and some small rooms. The main building is heel-shaped with a concave facade, as are other neolithic buildings in Shetland. It has a shallow crescent-shaped forecourt. An alcove outside the door may have been a guardroom. The building is entered from the forecourt via a short, dog-legged passage. The building's walls enclose an oval area about 40 by 22 feet (12.2 by 6.7 m) with six shallow recesses.

Excavations have found two post holes along the axis of the oval that each contained the carbonized remains of a spruce post 10 inches (250 mm) in width. The species of spruce, Picea abies (Norway spruce), is not native to Scotland; the posts were presumably driftwood carried across from Scandinavia. The floor of the building also contained charcoal from Scots Pine. The building most likely had a wooden ridge roof. There would have been few if any trees on the island when Stanydale was built, but driftwood must have been plentiful since it would have taken 700 metres (2,300 ft) of timber to construct the roof.

== Usage ==
Charles S. T. Calder explored the site in 1949. He thought that Stanydale was a temple, a name that has stuck, with a design originating from Mediterranean temples. He saw a strong resemblance to these structures, saying, "It is almost impossible not to assume that the Maltese temples are the prototypes from which Stanydale is derived and which solve the question of its purpose." Other archaeologists have cast doubt on the "temple" theory, but agree that the building is unique in Shetland of the period in apparently being designed for communal use or for a high-status person.

Excavations have found sherds of Beaker pottery and flat-based pots. Burnt barley grains have been found, as well as the remains of sheep and cattle. One of the buildings at Stanydale contained saddle-querns and grain-rubbers, which would have been used to grind the barley.

== Gallery ==
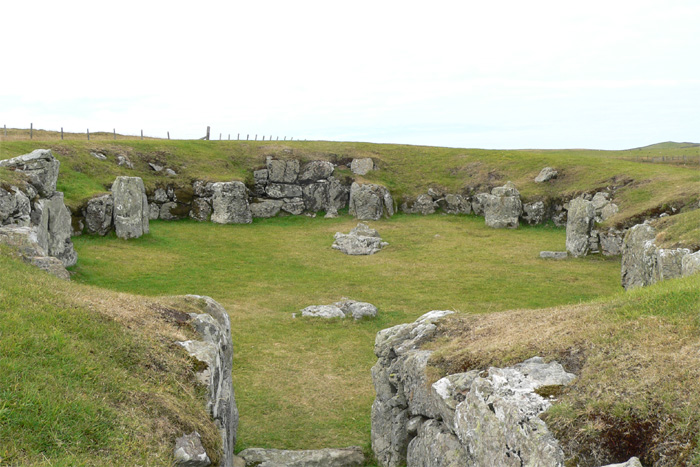

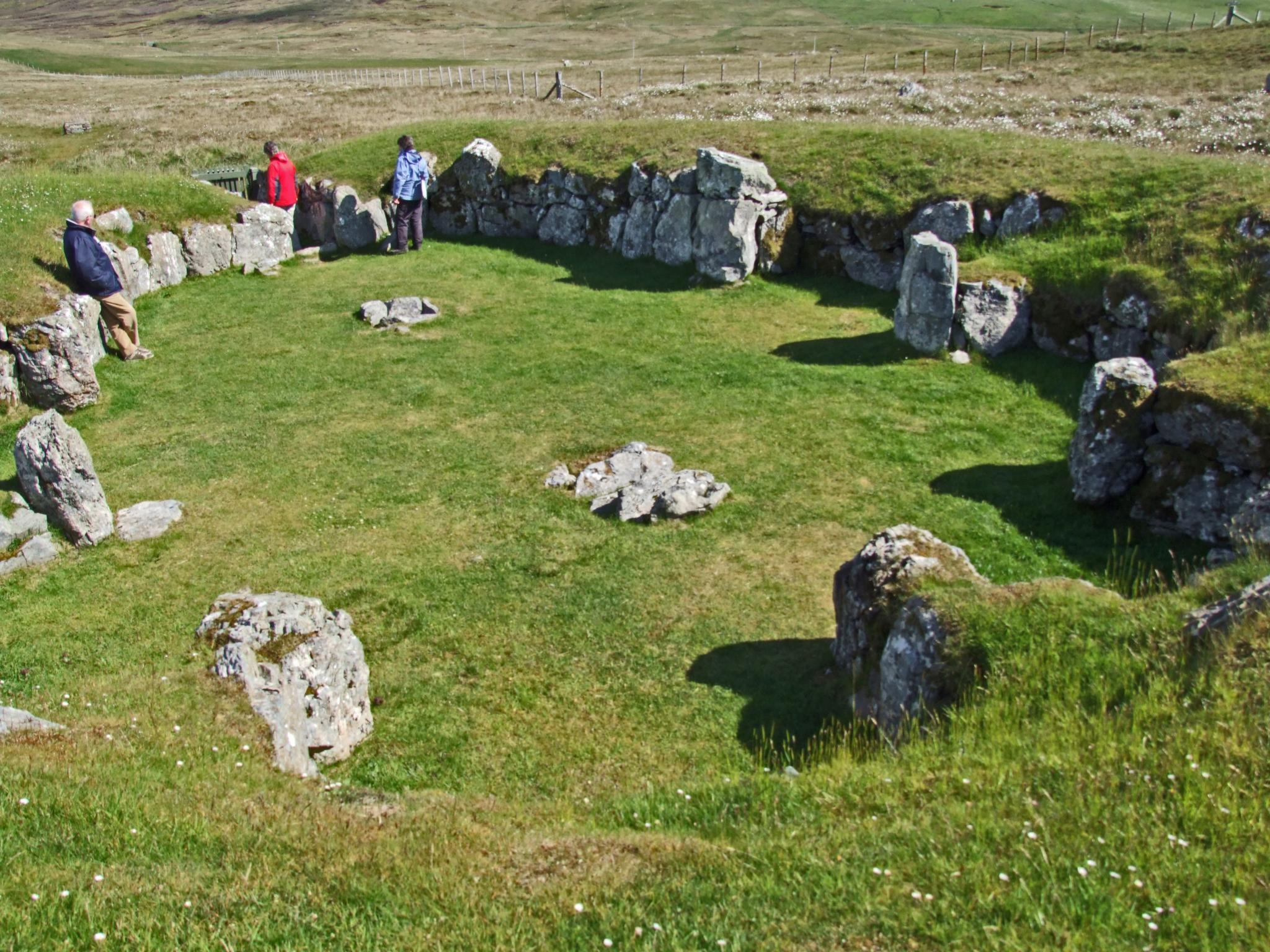

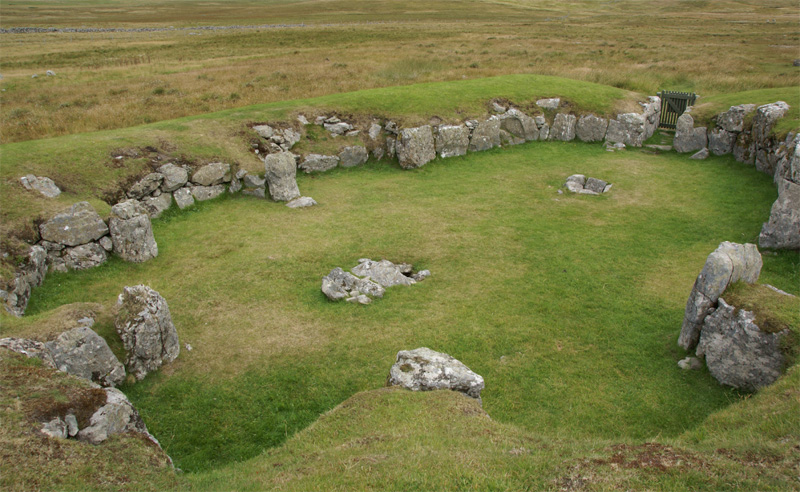

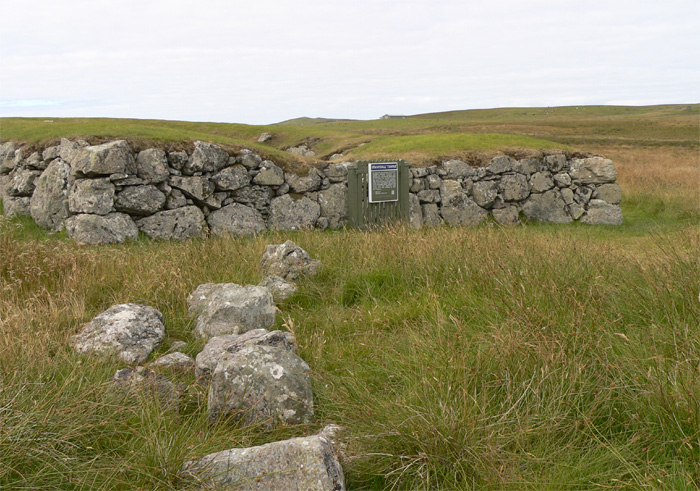
