= Skeld =

Coordinates: 60.188°N 1.441°W

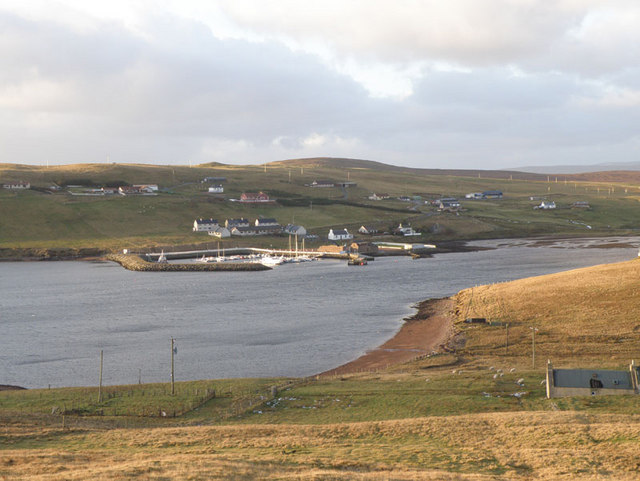
- The harbour at Skeld

- Location within Shetland
- OS grid reference: HU309449
- Civil parish: Sandsting
- Council area: Shetland
- Lieutenancy area: Shetland
- Country: Scotland
- Sovereign state: United Kingdom
- Post town: SHETLAND
- Postcode district: ZE2
- Dialling code: 01595
- Police: Scotland
- Fire: Scottish
- Ambulance: Scottish
- UK Parliament: Orkney and Shetland
- Scottish Parliament: Shetland

Skeld (Old Norse: Skjolðr, Shield or shelter) refers to two villages on the south side of the West Mainland of Shetland, Scotland. The main village is called Easter Skeld, while the western end of the settlement, about a mile away, is known as Wester Skeld. The council housing estate in Skeld is called Grindybrecks. It also has a school on a hill.

== Notable residents ==
The great 20th-century poet Vagaland's father was from Skeld, and he was born Thomas Alexander Robertson at nearby Westerwick. Vagaland retained a love for and a sense of belonging to this part of Shetland, though he moved to Walls as a small child.

Erraid Davies, swimmer and bronze medallist at the 2014 Commonwealth Games, lives in Skeld.
