= Sandsting =

Parish in Shetland, Scotland

Coordinates: 60°13′N 1°24′W

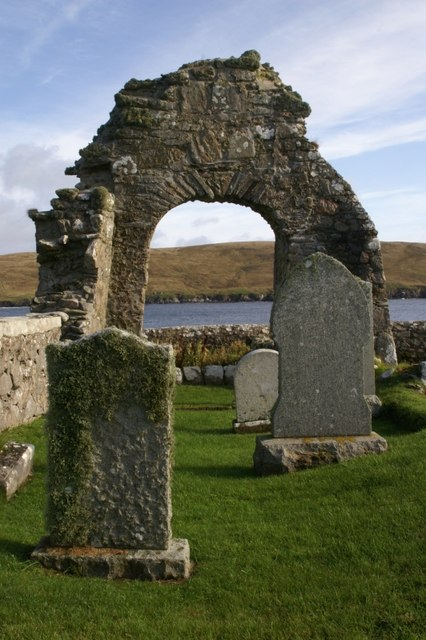
Ruins of St Mary's Chapel by Sand

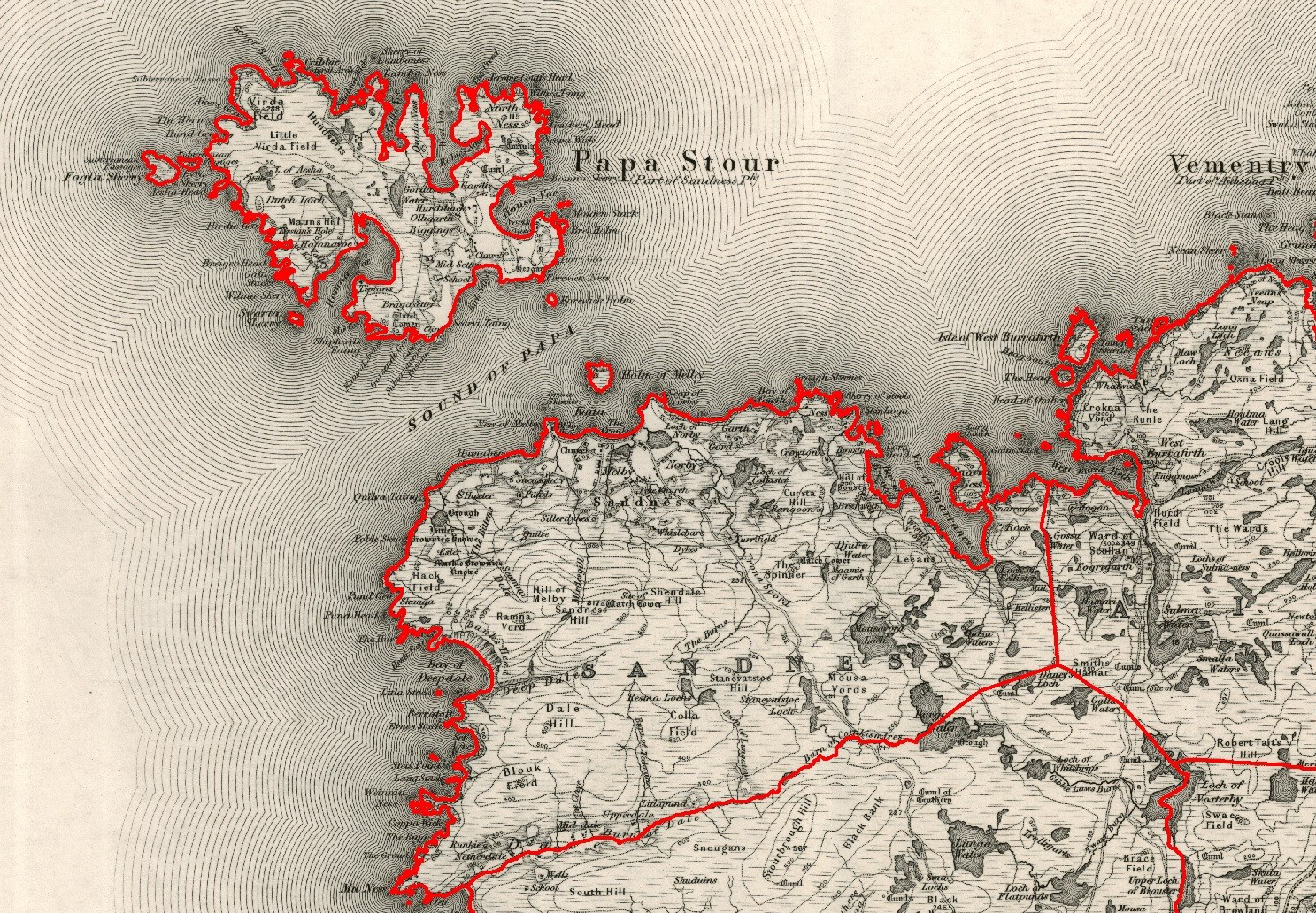
1878 map of Sandness Parish (west of Sandsting/Aithsting)

Sandsting is a parish in the West Mainland of Shetland, Scotland, forming a southern arm of the Walls Peninsula. After the parish of Aithsting was annexed into Sandsting in the sixteenth century, it became known as Sandsting and Aithsting parish.

== Summary ==
The parish includes the settlements of Skeld, Westerwick and Culswick. It contains the islands of Vementry and Papa Little together with a number of smaller islets, on the south side of St Magnus Bay, and comprehends a mainland district of about ten miles by eight between that bay and Scalloway Bay. The coast is partly bold, and cavernous; the seaboard is cut into sections by long bays; and the interior is mostly an assemblage of knolls and hillocks, with a profusion of heath and interspersions of moss.

The area of the parish is given as 162.4 km^{2}.

Antiquities include standing stones, burial monds and Old Norse fortifications, as well as church ruins and burial grounds. St Mary's Chapel in Sandsting was once the main church for the parish of Sandsting. The medieval church, which was built no later than the sixteenth century, now stands in ruin.

== Etymology ==
Sandsting is a place name derived from the farm of Sand. Ting, from the Old Norse Thing, is a reference to an assembly site or meeting place believed to have once been located within the area.

== Note ==
- This article is based in part on The Gazetteer of Scotland by Rev. John Wilson (1882) Published by W. & A.K. Johnstone, Edinburgh

== Related Reading ==
- Graham-Campbell, James and Batey, Colleen E. (1998) Vikings in Scotland: An Archaeological Survey (Edinburgh University Press.) ISBN 978-0-7486-0641-2
- Jakobsen Jakob (1936) The Dialect and Place Names of Shetland (David Nutt, London)
- Stewart, John (1987) Shetland Collection of Place-names (Shetland Library and Museum, Lerwick)
