= List of coastal features of Whalsay =

A list of coastal features of Whalsay island, Shetland Islands, Scotland:

== Bays, cliffs, and headlands ==
- Challister Ness
- Brough Head
- Clett Head
- Cobrie Geo
- Conni Geo
- Flukings Bight
- Gardie Geo
- Gorsendi Geo
- Grut Ness
- Guttald Geos
- The Haa
- Haa Ness
- Helli Geo
- Hemri Geo
- Hevda
- Kirk Ness
- Linga Sound
- Longi Geo
- Meo Ness
- Roo Ness
- Sefta Point
- Skaw Taing
- Skaw Voe
- Sponger Point
- Stivi Geo
- Suther Ness
- Symbister Ness
- Vai Voe
- Yoxie Geo

== Islets and stacks ==
- Andooing Skerry
- East Linga
- Flaeshans of Sandwick
- Grif Skerry
- Grunnels Stack
- Holm of Sandwick
- Inner Holm of Skaw
- Isbister Holm
- Mooa
- Nista
- Outer Holm of Skaw
- Rumble
- Sava Skerry
- Skate of Marrister
- Trota Stack
- West Linga
- Veeda Stack
- Whelsiegeo Stacks
