= North Park, Whalsay =

Coordinates: 60.352°N 1.017°W

North Park
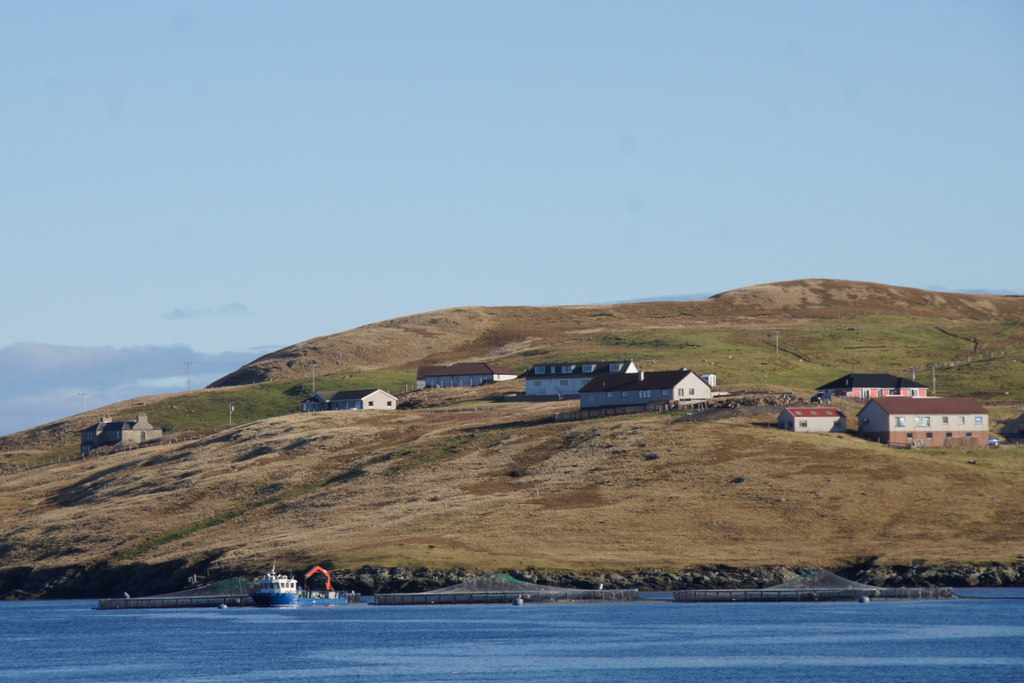
- North Point and North Park, Whalsay

- Location within Shetland
- OS grid reference: HU542634
- Civil parish: Nesting
- Council area: Shetland
- Lieutenancy area: Shetland
- Country: Scotland
- Sovereign state: United Kingdom
- Post town: SHETLAND
- Postcode district: ZE2
- Dialling code: 01806
- Police: Scotland
- Fire: Scottish
- Ambulance: Scottish
- UK Parliament: Orkney and Shetland
- Scottish Parliament: Shetland

North Park is a hamlet in southwestern Whalsay in the parish of Nesting in the Shetland Islands of Scotland. It lies to the north of Saltness and Symbister, just to the northwest of Hamister.
