= Nuckro Water =

Shetland loch

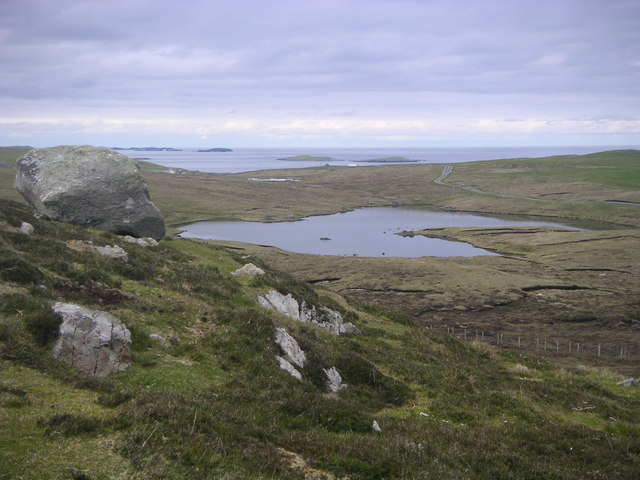
- Nuckro Water

- Location within Scotland
- Location: Whalsay, Shetland Islands, Scotland
- Coordinates: 60.35143°N 0.970983°W
- Type: loch

Nuckro Water is a loch of southeastern Whalsay, Shetland Islands, Scotland. It is located to the east of the Loch of Stanefield, northwest of Treawick and southwest of Isbister, and passes by the main road on its eastern side. Also known as Nuckra, Nyker, or Nyuggle, the name comes from the water spirit said to haunt lonely places. There is a disused quarry just to the northeast and the remains of a prehistoric house nearby. On the southeastern side, across the road near the source of Falsa Burn is an unroofed building, which was probably used as a mill; it was shown on the 1st OS map of Orkney and Shetland in 1882. In the southeastern corner of the loch there are stepping stones across the water.

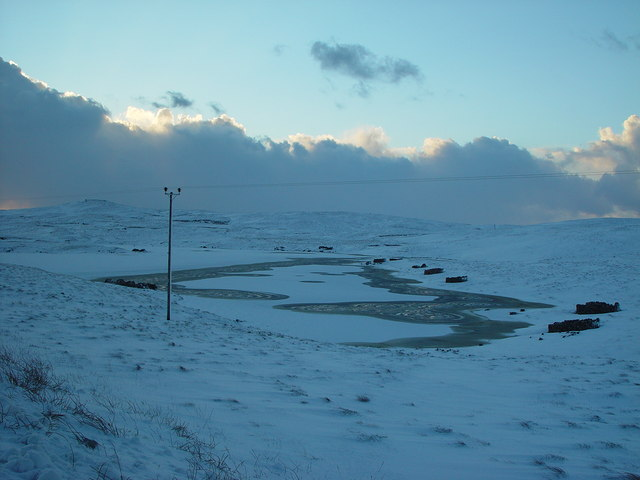
Looking west across the frozen Nuckro Water

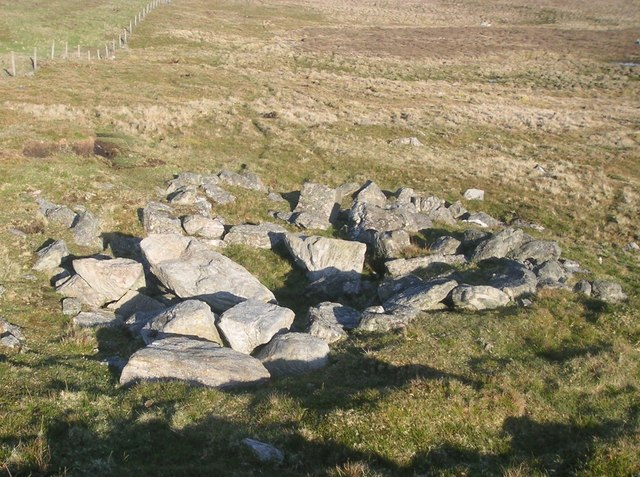
Prehistoric house
