= Treawick =

Coordinates: 60.348°N 0.962°W

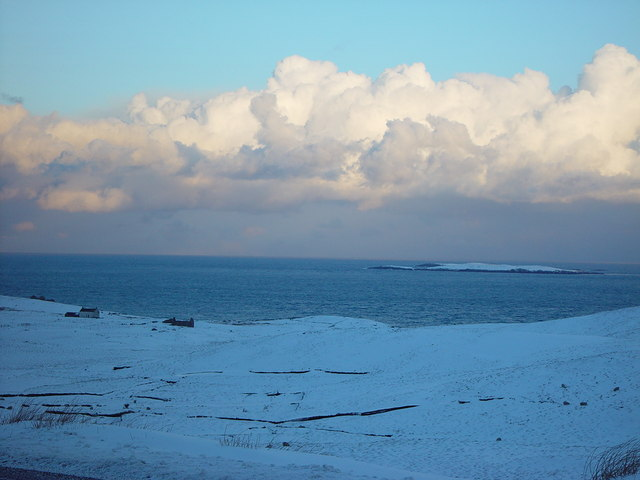
- Treawick

- Location within Shetland
- OS grid reference: HU572630
- Civil parish: Nesting
- Council area: Shetland
- Lieutenancy area: Shetland
- Country: Scotland
- Sovereign state: United Kingdom
- Post town: SHETLAND
- Postcode district: ZE2
- Police: Scotland
- Fire: Scottish
- Ambulance: Scottish
- UK Parliament: Orkney and Shetland
- Scottish Parliament: Shetland

Treawick, also Traewick, is an uninhabited crofting village in eastern Whalsay in the parish of Nesting in the Shetland Islands of Scotland. It is located to the south of Isbister and northeast of Huxter. Falsa Burn flows into the sea just to the south. The name of the village is Old Norse for tree. In the 1930s, when the road from Symbister to Isbister was being planned, the villagers protested against it passing through the village so it passed to the west of the village. The old crofting houses here have long been abandoned. Offshore is Rumble.
