= Hamister =

Coordinates: 60.348°N 1.012°W

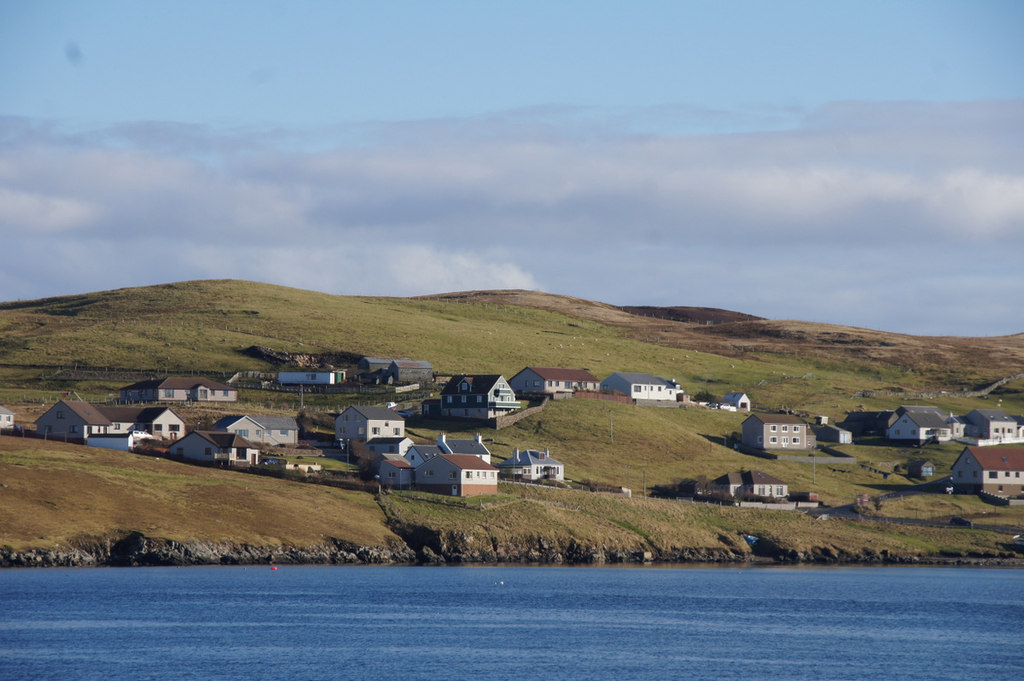
- Hamister viewed from Linga Sound

- Location within Shetland
- OS grid reference: HU545629
- Civil parish: Nesting
- Council area: Shetland
- Lieutenancy area: Shetland
- Country: Scotland
- Sovereign state: United Kingdom
- Post town: SHETLAND
- Postcode district: ZE2
- Dialling code: 01806
- Police: Scotland
- Fire: Scottish
- Ambulance: Scottish
- UK Parliament: Orkney and Shetland
- Scottish Parliament: Shetland

Hamister is a village in southwestern Whalsay in the parish of Nesting in the Shetland Islands of Scotland. It lies to the north of Symbister, just to the northeast of Saltness and southeast of North Park.
