= Little Water, Whalsay =

Coordinates: 60.351037°N 0.992661°W

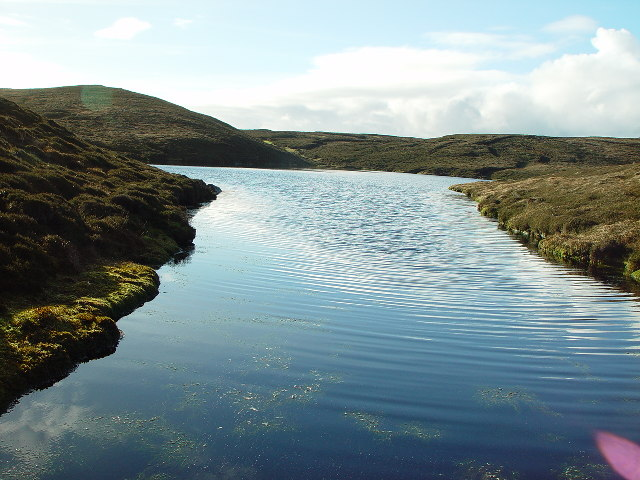
Little Water, looking west

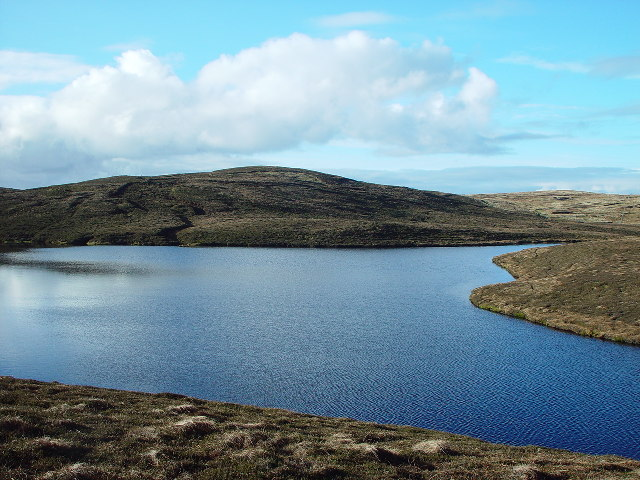
Little Water, looking southwest

Little Water is a small loch of southern-central Whalsay, Shetland Islands, Scotland. It is located to the north of the Loch of Livister, south of the Loch of Houll, and west of the Loch of Stanefield.

== See also ==
- List of lochs in Scotland
