= Clate =

Coordinates: 60.335°N 1.021°W

Clate: Clett
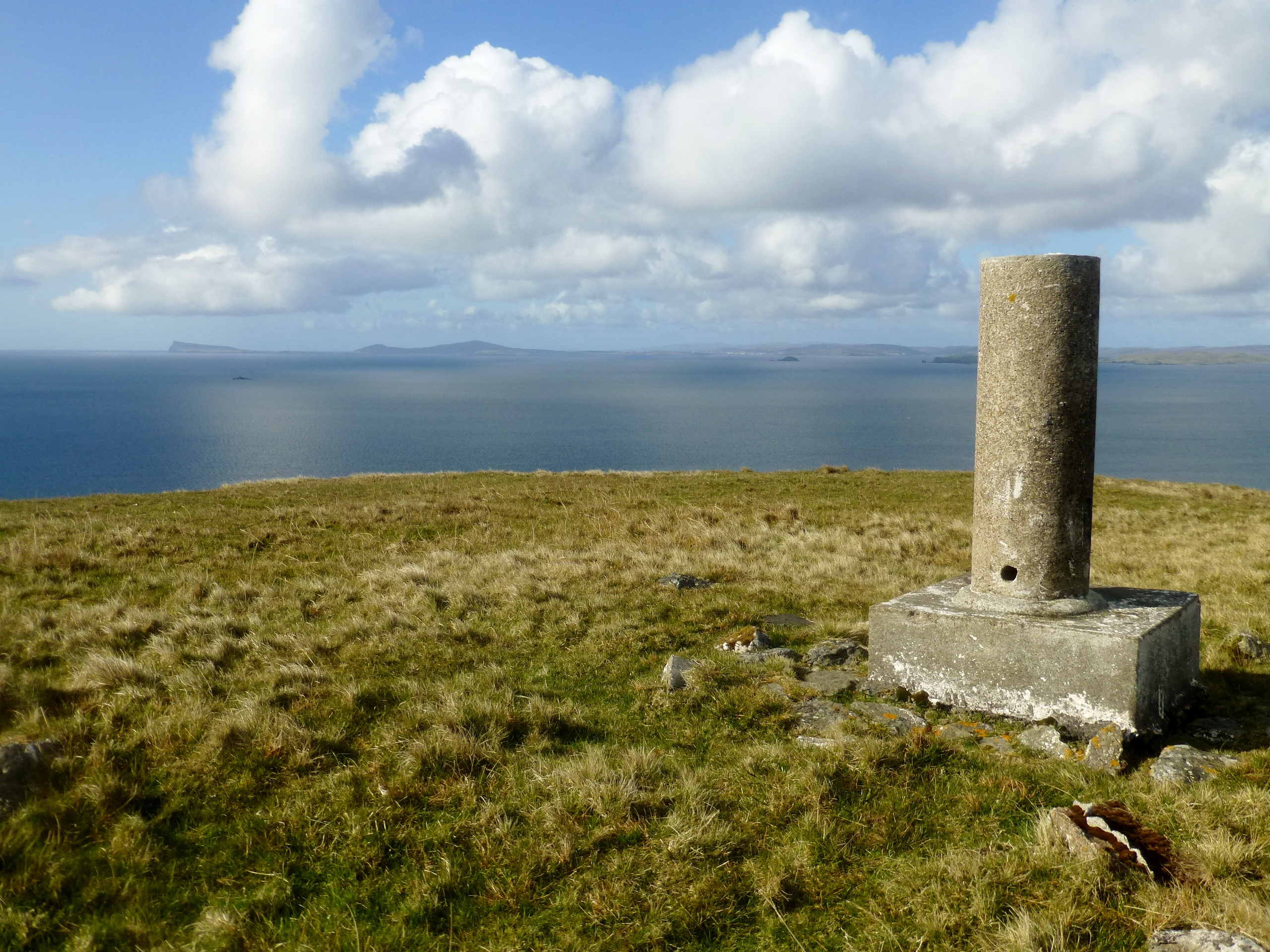
- Vanessa Trig On Ward of Clett

- Location within Shetland
- OS grid reference: HU544612
- Civil parish: Nesting
- Council area: Shetland
- Lieutenancy area: Shetland
- Country: Scotland
- Sovereign state: United Kingdom
- Post town: SHETLAND
- Postcode district: ZE2
- Dialling code: 01806
- Police: Scotland
- Fire: Scottish
- Ambulance: Scottish
- UK Parliament: Orkney and Shetland
- Scottish Parliament: Shetland

Clate (also known as Clett) is a hamlet and ward in southwestern Whalsay in the parish of Nesting in the Shetland Islands of Scotland.

== Geography ==
Clate is located south of the largest village of the island, Symbister, along the main road out of the village, just south of Sandwick. Haa Ness and Dimni Geo are coastal features at Clate, and the Holm of Sandwick lies off the coast. There are several caves to the southeast. From Clate, a track leads to the southeast, up to a quarry, then leads uphill, passing the southwestern ridge of the Ward of Clett.

== History ==
The British military established a radar camp in Clate during wartime. Tanks and sheds built by the military were still in use in 1986. A Catalina bomber crashed in the vicinity in the early part of World War II.
