= Skaw, Whalsay =

Coordinates: 60.379°N 0.927°W

Skaw
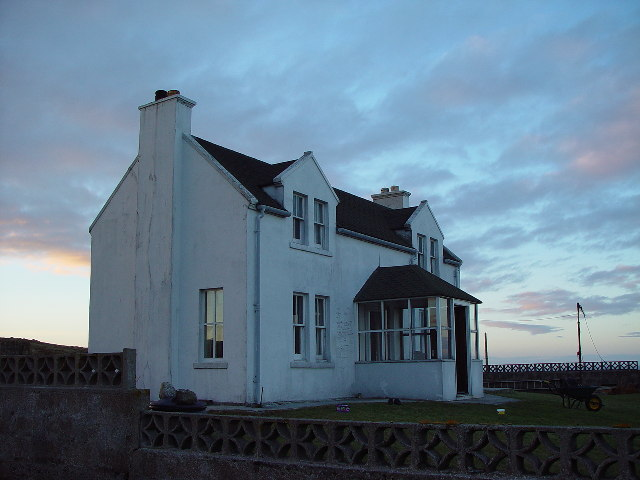
- Old Westhoose, Skaw

- Location within Shetland
- OS grid reference: HU591665
- Civil parish: Nesting
- Council area: Shetland
- Lieutenancy area: Shetland
- Country: Scotland
- Sovereign state: United Kingdom
- Post town: SHETLAND
- Postcode district: ZE2
- Dialling code: 01806
- Police: Scotland
- Fire: Scottish
- Ambulance: Scottish
- UK Parliament: Orkney and Shetland
- Scottish Parliament: Shetland

Skaw is a village in the extreme northeast of Whalsay in the parish of Nesting in the Shetland Islands of Scotland. It is mainly a crofting area. Whalsay airstrip and Whalsay Golf Club, the most northerly golf club in the British Isles, lie in the vicinity. The East Loch of Skaw lies to the east of the village, and the West Loch of Skaw to the southwest. A house here, named Westhoose, has been rebuilt three times. Skaw Voe is a standing stone, 1.5 metres high, which stands 50 metres from the shore. Off Skaw Taing there are the islets of the Outer Holm of Skaw and the Inner Holm of Skaw, the latter of which contains a ruined chapel.
