= Tripwell =

Coordinates: 60.361°N 0.999°W

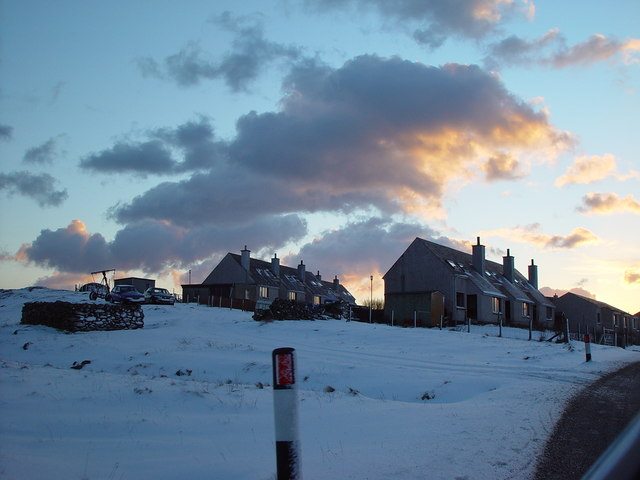
- Council Houses, Tripwell

- Location within Shetland
- OS grid reference: HU552644
- Civil parish: Nesting
- Council area: Shetland
- Lieutenancy area: Shetland
- Country: Scotland
- Sovereign state: United Kingdom
- Post town: SHETLAND
- Postcode district: ZE2
- Dialling code: 01806
- Police: Scotland
- Fire: Scottish
- Ambulance: Scottish
- UK Parliament: Orkney and Shetland
- Scottish Parliament: Shetland

Tripwell is a hamlet in western Whalsay in the parish of Nesting in the Shetland islands of Scotland. It is located to the south of the village of Brough, northeast of Marrister. Scarfmoor Burn passes on the eastern side of the settlement, passing an old mill in Tripwell. Council houses were built in Tripwell in the late 1970, consisting of sheltered housing for senior citizens and 2 and 3 bedroom family houses.

In 1993, Ship's Monthly reported that a Joseph Kay of 18 Tripwell was researching the life history of Captain Thomas Kay, master of the sailing vessel Earl of Dunmore (1891-1903), contributing to the local history of Shetland.
