= Sandwick, Whalsay =

Coordinates: 60.337°N 1.021°W

Sandwick
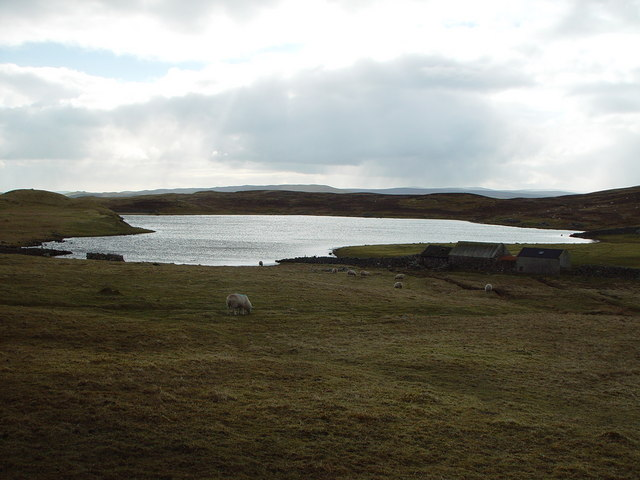
- Loch of Sandwick, Whalsay, Shetland

- Location within Shetland
- OS grid reference: HU540618
- Civil parish: Nesting
- Council area: Shetland
- Lieutenancy area: Shetland
- Country: Scotland
- Sovereign state: United Kingdom
- Post town: SHETLAND
- Postcode district: ZE2
- Dialling code: 01806
- Police: Scotland
- Fire: Scottish
- Ambulance: Scottish
- UK Parliament: Orkney and Shetland
- Scottish Parliament: Shetland

Sandwick is a hamlet, often considered part of the main village of Symbister along with adjacent Harlsdale, in the parish of Nesting in southwestern Whalsay in the Shetland Islands of Scotland. It is located to the south of the main centre of Symbister; Clate lies just to the south. The Holm of Sandwick lies off the coast. The British military established a radar camp in the vicinity during wartime and tanks and sheds built by the military were still in use in 1986. A Catalina bomber crashed in the vicinity in the early part of World War II. The Loch of Sandwick lies to the west of the village. There are burnt mounds in the lake area and caves along the coast here.
