= Pettigarths Field Cairns =

Neolithic archaeological site

- Pettigarths Field Cairns location in Whalsay, Shetland
- 60.367548°N 0.941227°W
- Location: Shetland, Scotland

History
- Built: Neolithic age

The Pettigarths Field Cairns is a Neolithic site in the parish of Nesting, northeastern Whalsay, in the Shetland islands of Scotland. It is located approximately 140 metres (460 ft) to the northwest of Benie Hoose. The site contains upright stones as well as masonry. The south cairn is roughly 6 metres (20 ft) square, with an eastern entrance passage and circular chamber about 2 metres (6 ft 7 in) across. 4 metres (13 ft) to the north is a round cairn, 4.5 metres (15 ft) in diameter, with a rectangular cist. The two cairns are located on a rise, about 140 metres (460 ft) northwest of Benie Hoose.

The first archaeological explorations were carried out in 1936 and 1938. They were then inferred to be tombs belonging to the Late Stone Age and Early Bronze Age. It was excavated in 1963 by C. S. T. Calder and visited by OS (NKB) on 30 May 1968.

== Layout ==
The large cairn has a paved chamber and passage. The chamber is small and is heel-shaped; it is different in layout from three other cairns found in Shetland. The passage into the cairn is through two standing boulders. It is an expanding passage where stones are seen at its inner end. Parts of the jambs are described as the "terminal and lateral recesses of the trefoil." Some remnants of pottery were found here which could not be identified because of the fragmentary nature.

The smaller, circular cairn was excavated up to its foundations. A slab covering was found in the cavity as grave robbers appeared to have tried robbing the tomb's interior. It revealed a trapezoidal slab-built cist of 4 feet (1.2 m) in length with a paved bottom. The cist has a rubble stone lining, partly surviving. The ring is 15 feet (4.6 m) in diameter; compared to the large sized boulder setting, it is indicative that an outer circular enclosure wall existed at one time.
