= Neap (disambiguation) =

Neap is a village in Scotland.

Neap may also refer to:

- Near Earth Asteroid Prospector, a spacecraft
- Neaps or neap tide, where the tide's range is at its minimum
