= List of listed buildings in Nesting, Shetland Islands =

This is a list of listed buildings in the parish of Nesting in the Shetland islands of Scotland.

== List ==
| Name | Location | Date Listed | Grid Ref. (Note: Sometimes known as OSGB36, the grid reference (where provided) is based on the British national grid reference system used by the Ordnance Survey. • "Guide to National Grid". Ordnance Survey. • "Get-a-map". Ordnance Survey.) | Geo-coordinates | Notes | LB Number (Note: Historic Environment Scotland assign a unique alphanumeric identifier to each designated site in Scotland, for listed buildings this always begins with "LB", for example "LB12345".) | Image |
|---|---|---|---|---|---|---|---|
| Lunnasting, Lunna, Fishing Booth, Including Drying Beach | | | | 60°24′09″N 1°07′07″W | Category B | 45273 | Upload Photo |
| Whalsay, Symbister, Symbister House (Now School), Including Area Walls, Stables, Dovecote, Boundary Walls, And Gatepiers | | | | 60°20′24″N 1°01′05″W | Category B | 18596 | Upload Photo |
| Brettabister, Neap Old Manse, Including Stable, Steading, Boundary Walls And Gatepiers | | | | 60°18′22″N 1°05′35″W | Category C(S) | 45272 | Upload Photo |
| Lunnasting, Lunna, Lunna Harbour, Including Pier Building And Piers, Wall, Steps, And Lime Kiln | | | | 60°24′15″N 1°07′19″W | Category B | 45277 | Upload Photo |
| Lunnasting, Lunna, West Gates, Including Walls | | | | 60°24′13″N 1°07′13″W | Category B | 45280 | Upload Photo |
| Whalsay, Symbister, South West Dock, Including New Hoose, Fish House, And Carpenter's Shed | | | | 60°20′28″N 1°01′44″W | Category C(S) | 45285 | Upload Photo |
| Whalsay, Kirk Ness, Whalsay Kirk, Including Boundary Walls And Gatepiers | | | | 60°22′10″N 0°59′43″W | Category B | 18592 | Upload Photo |
| Lunnasting, Lunna, Steading, Including Walls And Gatepier | | | | 60°24′17″N 1°07′05″W | Category C(S) | 45278 | Upload Photo |
| Brettabister, St Ola's (Nesting) Kirk (Church Of Scotland), Including Memorial Enclosure | | | | 60°18′06″N 1°07′12″W | Category B | 18589 | Upload Photo |
| Lunnasting, Lunna, Walled Garden | | | | 60°24′16″N 1°07′00″W | Category B | 45279 | Upload Photo |
| Outskerries, Bound Skerry, Bound Skerry Lighthouse | | | | 60°25′28″N 0°43′41″W | Category B | 19894 | Upload Photo |
| Whalsay, Symbister, Pier House And Hem Dock | | | | 60°20′31″N 1°01′30″W | Category B | 18593 | Upload Photo |
| Whalsay, Symbister, Harbour View (Formerly Bremen Booth), Including Garden And Retaining Walls, And Outbuilding | | | | 60°20′32″N 1°01′28″W | Category C(S) | 18594 | Upload Photo |
| Outskerries, Bruray, Harbour Shop And Store | | | | 60°25′24″N 0°45′03″W | Category C(S) | 45282 | Upload Photo |
| Whalsay, Symbister, Skeo | | | | 60°20′28″N 1°01′32″W | Category C(S) | 45284 | Upload Photo |
| Lunnasting, Lunna, St Margaret's (Lunnasting) Kirk (Church Of Scotland), Including Kirkyard Wall | | | | 60°24′10″N 1°07′12″W | Category B | 18590 | Upload Photo |
| Lunnasting, Lunna, Folly | | | | 60°24′04″N 1°07′29″W | Category B | 45274 | Upload Photo |
| Lunnasting, Lunna, Former Schoolhouse | | | | 60°24′24″N 1°06′52″W | Category B | 45275 | Upload Photo |
| Lunnasting, Lunna, Gothick Cottage | | | | 60°24′08″N 1°07′21″W | Category B | 45276 | Upload Photo |
| Lunnasting, Outrabister, Including Outbuilding | | | | 60°26′03″N 1°05′17″W | Category C(S) | 45281 | Upload Photo |
| Outskerries, Grunay, Lighthouse Keeper' Houses, Including Water Tanks, Walled Garden, And Sundial | | | | 60°25′19″N 0°44′17″W | Category C(S) | 45283 | Upload Photo |
| Lunnasting, Lunna, Lunna House, Including Garden And Retaining Walls, Gatepiers, Outbuilding, Sundial And Avenue Walls | | | | 60°24′15″N 1°07′07″W | Category B | 18591 | Upload Photo |

== Key ==
The scheme for classifying buildings in Scotland is:

- Category A: "buildings of national or international importance, either architectural or historic; or fine, little-altered examples of some particular period, style or building type."
- Category B: "buildings of regional or more than local importance; or major examples of some particular period, style or building type, which may have been altered."
- Category C: "buildings of local importance; lesser examples of any period, style, or building type, as originally constructed or moderately altered; and simple traditional buildings which group well with other listed buildings."

In March 2016 there were 47,288 listed buildings in Scotland. Of these, 8% were Category A, and 50% were Category B, with the remaining 42% being Category C.
