= Marrister =

Coordinates: 60.357°N 1.016°W

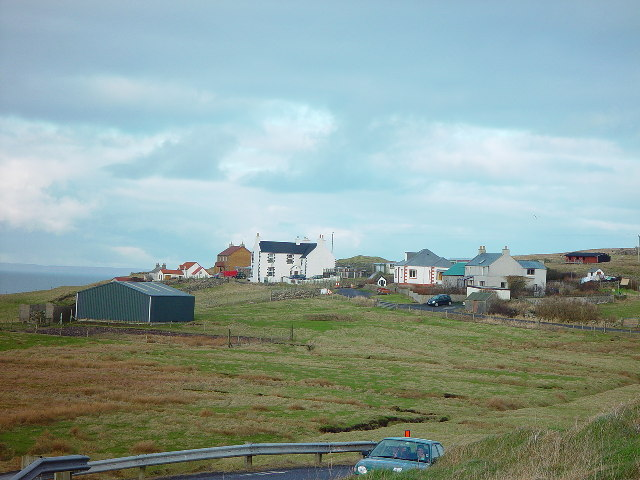
- Marrister, Whalsay. The two storey white building is the auld manse.

- Location within Shetland
- OS grid reference: HU542640
- Civil parish: Nesting
- Council area: Shetland
- Lieutenancy area: Shetland
- Country: Scotland
- Sovereign state: United Kingdom
- Post town: SHETLAND
- Postcode district: ZE2
- Dialling code: 01806
- Police: Scotland
- Fire: Scottish
- Ambulance: Scottish
- UK Parliament: Orkney and Shetland
- Scottish Parliament: Shetland

Marrister is a settlement on the west coast of Whalsay in the parish of Nesting in the Shetland islands of Scotland. It looks across Linga Sound to the island of West Linga.

== History ==
Marrister was occupied in Viking times, and a gold Viking ring was unearthed there. In the 19th century and early 20th century, it was associated with the Smith family. A large flat rock off Marrister is known as the Skate of Marrister. In the 1870s, Robert Cowie mentioned the "neat manse and still neater church" of Marrister, which had been recently built.
