= Setter Hill, Whalsay =

Coordinates: 60.355°N 1.008°W

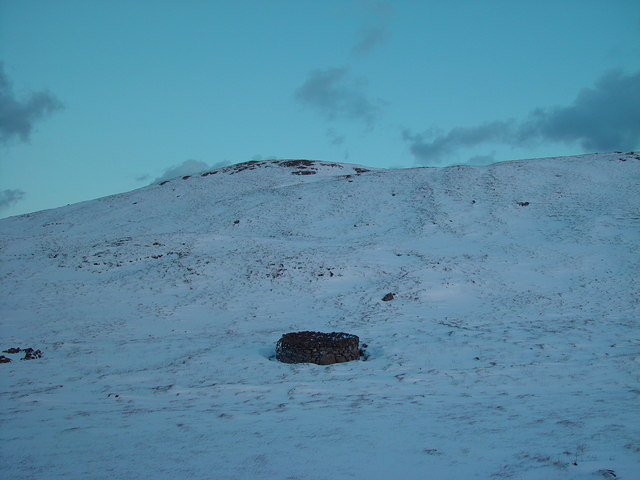
The west flank of Setter Hill

Setter Hill is a hill in western Whalsay, Shetland Islands, Scotland. It lies to the southeast of the village of Marrister and northeast of the main village on the island, Symbister. The source of Scarfmoor Burn is on the southeastern side of Setter Hill. On its eastern side is the Loch of Houll. There is an old quarry in the vicinity. Since the spring of 2001, the hill has been part of Shetland's Past Project, a project geared towards encouraging and training individuals to undertake archaeological surveys of their local landscapes in the Shetland Islands.
