= Scarfmoor Burn =

Stream in Whalsay, Shetland Islands, Scotland

Coordinates: 60.357°N 0.999°W

Scarfmoor Burn is a burn (stream) in western Whalsay, Shetland Islands, Scotland. The source of the stream is on the southeastern side of Setter Hill. It flows in a northeasterly then north direction. A right tributary flows into the Loch of Houll. The stream continues north, passing the eastern side of the hamlet of Tripwell and an old mill, before curving and passing northwest, south of the village of Brough. It enters the sea, not far from Brough Head.
