= Charles Calder =

Charles Calder may refer to:

- Charles Calder (politician) (1858–1920), Ontario farmer and political figure
- Charles S. T. Calder (c. 1891–1972), Scottish archaeologist
