= Loch of Stanefield =

Shetland loch

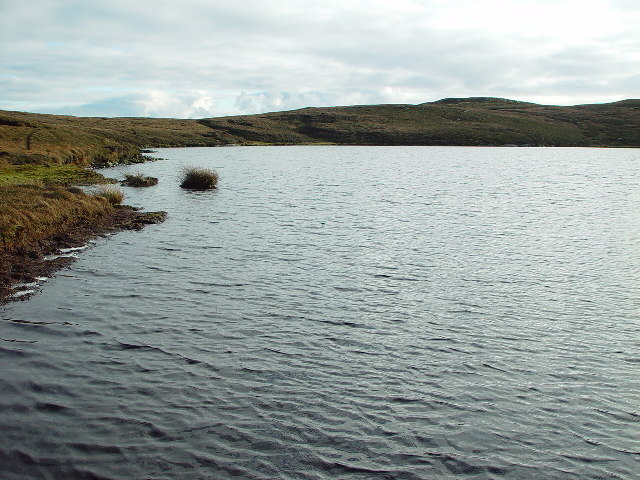
- Looking southeast across the shore of the Loch of Stanefield

- Location within Shetland
- Location: Whalsay, Shetland Islands, Scotland
- Coordinates: 60.351954°N 0.980859°W
- Type: loch

Loch of Stanefield is a small loch of southern-central Whalsay, Shetland Islands, Scotland. It is located to the northeast of the Loch of Livister, west of Nuckro Water, and east of Little Water.
