= Isbister Holm =

Islet in the Shetland Islands

Coordinates: 60.358425°N 0.907465°W

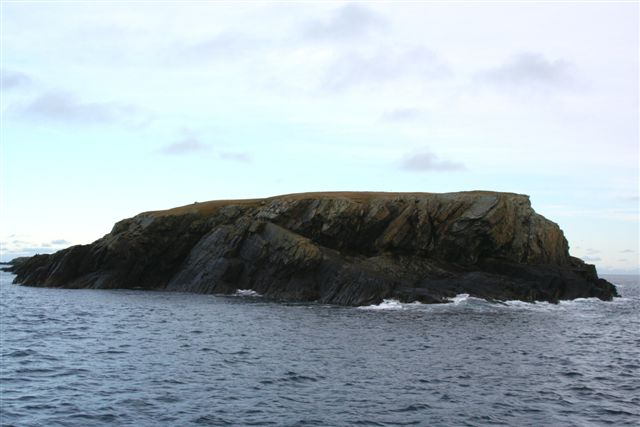
Isbister Holm

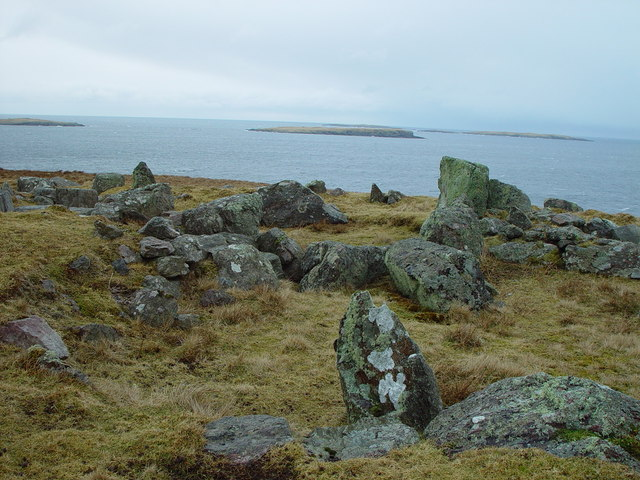
Isbister Holm (directly ahead), viewed from the Standing Stones of Yoxie

Isbister Holm is a small islet in the Shetland islands of Scotland, situated roughly 2 kilometres (1.2 mi) east off the coast of Isbister, Whalsay. The highest point of the islet is about 65 feet (20 m) and it measures roughly 500 metres (1,600 ft) by 250 metres (820 ft). To the north are the islets of Mooa and Nista.

On 12 November 1778 Jufron Ingester was shipwrecked, probably on the holm, the precise location not being certain. It was carrying some 260 tons of skins, tallow and coarse hose from Ireland to Copenhagen. One crew member died and the cargo was not salvaged.
