= Whalsay Parish Church =

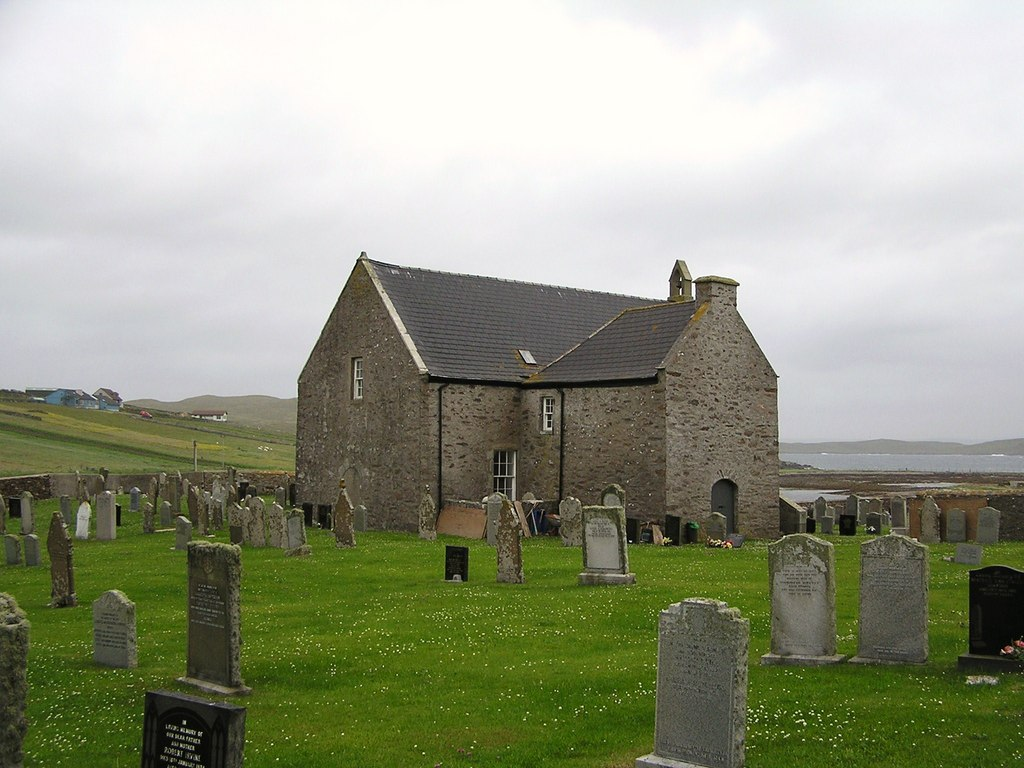
- Whalsay Kirk

- Location on Whalsay Whalsay Parish Church (Scotland)
- 60°22′10″N 0°59′43″W
- Location: Whalsay
- Country: Scotland
- Denomination: Church of Scotland
- Churchmanship: Presbyterian

History
- Dedication: Holy Rood

Whalsay Parish Church or Whalsay Kirk is a Church of Scotland parish church on the island of Whalsay, Shetland Islands, Scotland. It lies to the north of the village of Brough, on the southern part of a promontory known as Kirk Ness, connected to the mainland by a neck of land. It is the main burial ground for villagers of Whalsay. It is one of three churches in the Parish of Nesting, the others being at Nesting and Lunnesting. The church is a category B Listed Building.

== History ==
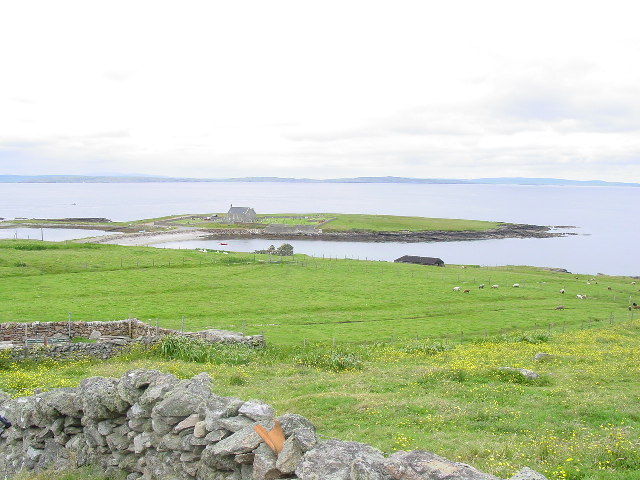
Distant view of Whalsay Parish Church, Kirk Ness

The church, dedicated to the Holy Rood, was within a quoad sacra parish. In 1845, Whalsay Church was reportedly visited by the parish minister eleven times in the year. It was intended that the church to be endowed as a Parliamentary church, but that did not occur. At the time, a new roof was added, and the seating was noted to be uncomfortable. Whalsay Kirk became a Category B listed building in 1974.

== Architecture and fittings ==
This ancient church is located over the North Ness. The kirk is on the site of an earlier church (1733), apparently a simple T-shaped construction with arched doors and a galleried interior. The pulpit probably stood between the central windows of the south wall. The church was remodelled in 1867, in fieldstone with sandstone trimmings, as a galleried hall with a two-storey northern wing. It has a modern grey tile roof. There are four bays on the south wall, two with large highly positioned windows at the centre, flanked by two with smaller windows at a lower level. Projecting cills have been provided over the windows. The round-arched door on the western facade is topped by a polished ashlar bellcote. The north wing, which serves as a vestry, contains a memorial to Alexander Shand. The former doorway on the east wall is topped by a central window dated 1767. The interior is fitted with 19th-century wainscoting, horizontally boarded pews, a gallery, and a panelled pulpit on the north side accessed by stairs.

== Grounds ==
The church is enclosed within a boundary wall which is built in rubble masonry. The walls have a coping in semicircular shape made in concrete. The entrance gate is fitted between pillars. The pillars are also made of cement concrete with pyramidal caps fitted with wrought-iron gate which is embedded with medallions. The kirkyard is a modern wall around the extensions to the north and west. There are war memorials (First and Second World Wars) in the kirkyard.
