= Falsa Burn =

Stream on Whalsay, Shetland Islands, Scotland

Coordinates: 60.346°N 0.970°W

Falsa Burn is a burn (stream) of southeastern Whalsay, Shetland Islands, Scotland. Roughly 600 metres (2,000 ft) in length, it ends near the sea to the south of Treawick, near Falsa Geo. Near the source, across the road from Nuckro Water is an unroofed building, which was probably used as a mill; it was shown on the 1st OS map of Orkney and Shetland in 1882.
