= Loch of Houll =

Coordinates: 60.359242°N 0.993337°W

- Location within Shetland
- Location: Whalsay, Shetland Islands
- Type: natural loch
- Primary inflows: several burns (streams)
- Basin countries: Scotland, Great Britain
- Max. length: 2,250 ft (690 m)
- Max. width: 1,115 ft (340 m)

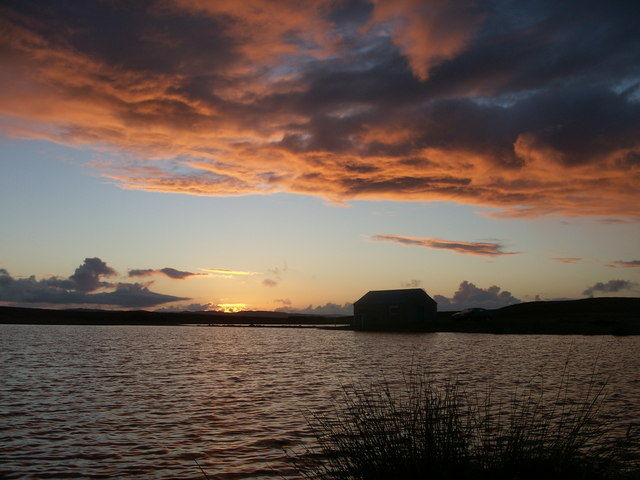
Loch of Houll at sunset

Loch of Houll is a loch on Whalsay, one of the Shetland islands of Scotland. It is located to the southeast of Brough and on the eastern side of Setter Hill. An eastern tributary of the Scarfmoor Burn passes into the western side of the loch. It is described as a "large shallow loch with brown trout averaging 8-10 oz and some over 2 lbs." On the western side of the loch is Peerie Roonie House, a ruined stone house, which still has traces of the inner face of a drystone wall and drain. Archaeologists excavating at the site discovered stone tools dated to the Neolithic period and peat ash.

== Whalsay Model Yacht Club ==
The Loch of Houll is home to the Whalsay Model Yacht Club, which has a boathouse on the shore. Members of the club sail yachts with a waterline length of 60 cm in twos throughout the winter, and stage an event on Christmas Day, known as the "Yule Dee model yacht race". Locals join in with the festivities during which sailing is followed by Christmas dinner, and a bonfire and fireworks are lit later.
