= Saltness =

Hamlet in the Shetland Islands, Scotland

Coordinates: 60.344°N 1.019°W

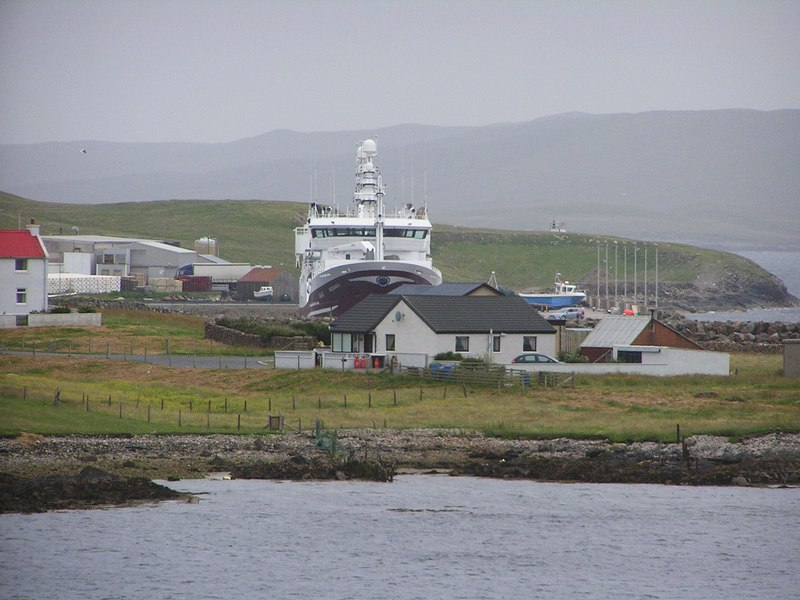
- Saltness, with a pelagic trawler at Symbister Harbour, in the background

- Location within Shetland
- OS grid reference: HU540626
- Civil parish: Nesting
- Council area: Shetland
- Lieutenancy area: Shetland
- Country: Scotland
- Sovereign state: United Kingdom
- Post town: SHETLAND
- Postcode district: ZE2
- Dialling code: 01806
- Police: Scotland
- Fire: Scottish
- Ambulance: Scottish
- UK Parliament: Orkney and Shetland
- Scottish Parliament: Shetland

Saltness is a hamlet in southwestern Whalsay in the parish of Nesting in the Shetland Islands of Scotland. It lies in the northern part of Symbister, just to the southwest of Hamister.
