= Loch of Isbister =

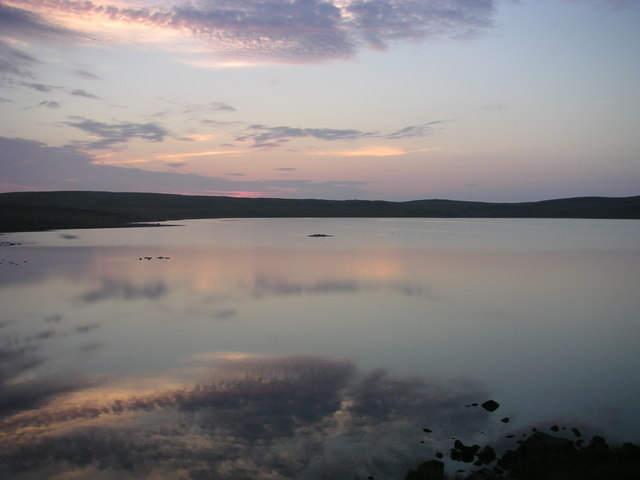
- Waters of the Loch of Isbister

- Location within Scotland
- Location: Whalsay, Shetland Islands, Scotland
- Coordinates: 60.358707°N 0.956734°W
- Type: loch

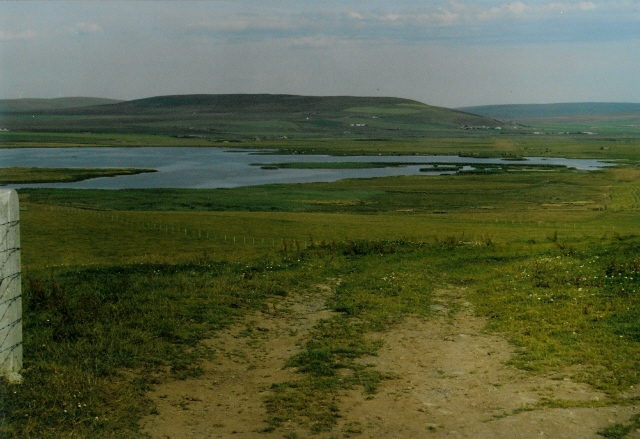
Loch of Isbister, from the west

Loch of Isbister is a loch of Whalsay, Shetland Islands, Scotland, located on the northern side of Isbister on the eastern side of the island.
