= Little Linga =

Small island in the Shetland Islands

Coordinates: 60°22′3″N 1°3′2″W

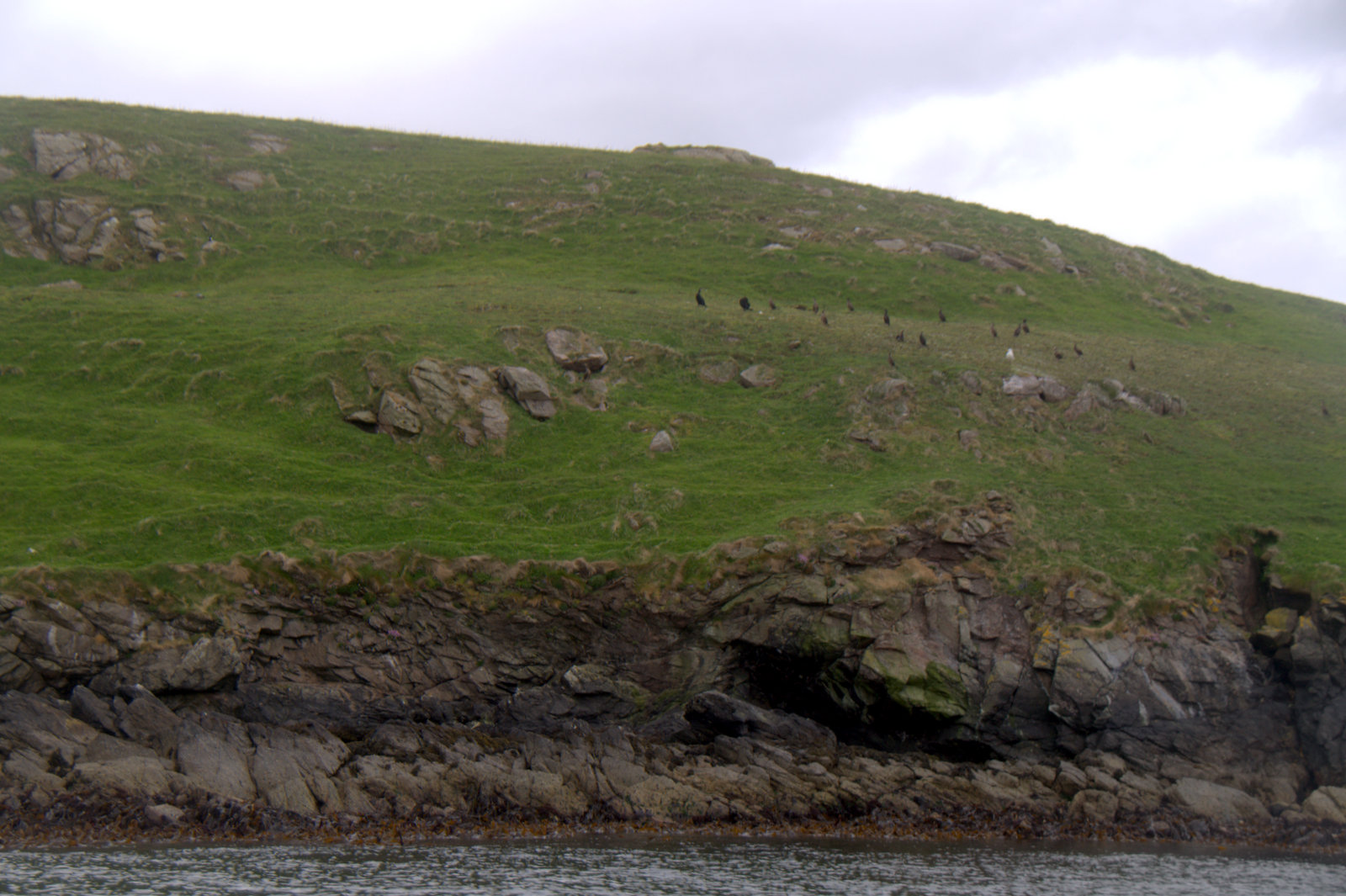

Location
- Little Linga shown within Shetland

Administration
- Council area: Shetland Islands
- Country: Scotland
- Sovereign state: United Kingdom

Demographics
- Population: 0

Little Linga is a small uninhabited island in the Shetland Islands. It lies near West Linga and Vidlin, off Mainland, Shetland. It reaches 20 metres (66 ft) at its highest point and measures 500 metres (550 yd) from north to south.

Surrounding islands include the Calf of Little Linga, Score Holm, and Beilla Skerry.

== See also ==
- List of islands of Scotland
