= Pier House Museum =

Museum in the Shetland Islands, Scotland

Coordinates: 60.34206°N 1.02508°W

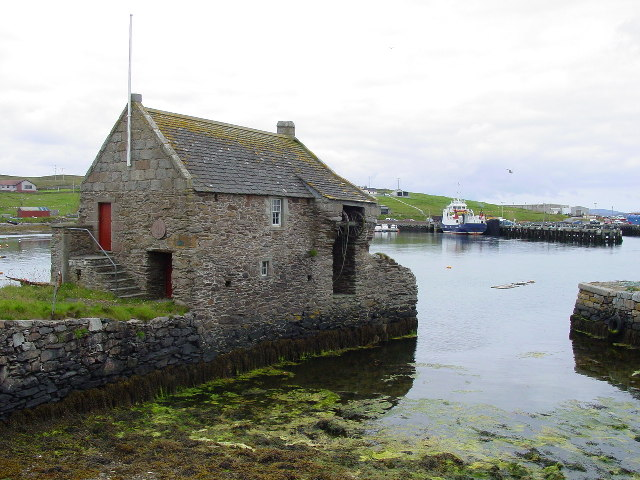
Pier House

The Pier House Museum is a museum in Symbister, Whalsay, in the Shetland Islands of Scotland. The museum is located in the old Pier House, which was once the centre for trade with the Germans and the export of dried and salted fish to the Hanseatic League, an alliance of trading guilds that established and maintained a trade monopoly over much of Northern Europe between the 13th and 17th centuries. The Germans brought their goods, iron tools, seeds, salt and cloth to barter for dried and salted fish from the island. The old Hanseatic house which had been used by the Germans for several centuries until 1707, was refurbished for the museum, housing artefacts which date from the earlier trading period and providing an important insight into the economy of Shetland at the time. Architecturally it is described as "two-storeyed with crowstepped gables, and an external stone staircase." The house and port nearby are categorised officially as a category B Listed Building.
