= Alexander Levie =

Scottish veterinary surgeon (1865–1955)

Alexander ("Alsie") Levie FRSE FRCVS (1865–1955) was a Scottish veterinary surgeon.

== Life ==
He was born on 31 August 1865 in the manse at Nesting, Shetland the son of Rev William Levie of Aberdeen (1831–1901) and his wife Eliza Greig Pole (1835–1886). He studied Veterinary Science in Edinburgh. On qualifying he taught in Nottingham and then for 32 years in Derby.

In 1910 he was elected a Fellow of the Royal Society of Edinburgh. His proposers were Orlando Charnock Bradley, John Glaister, Robert Wallace and McLauchlan Young.

He died at Overfields, Quarndon in Derbyshire on 5 December 1955.

== Family ==
In 1893 he married Mary Anna Osborne Campbell (1870–1956) at the Commercial Hotel in Kirkcudbright. She was the daughter of Thomas Campbell, vet. They had one daughter, Annie Osborne Levie.
