= West Loch of Skaw =

Coordinates: 60.374702°N 0.950335°W

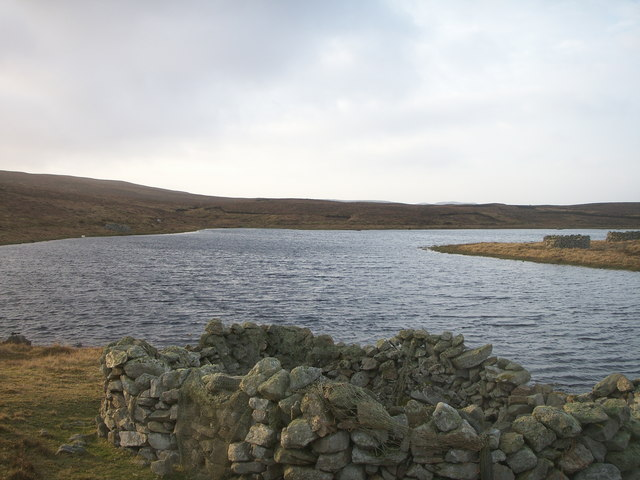
East side of the West Loch of Skaw

West Loch of Skaw is a loch of northern-central Whalsay, Shetland Islands, Scotland, to the southwest of the village of Skaw, Whalsay.
