= Inner Holm of Skaw =

Small, uninhabited islet in the Shetland Islands of Scotland

Location
- Location within Shetland
- Coordinates: 60.3868°N 0.9129°W

Physical geography
- Island group: Shetland
- Highest elevation: 32 feet (9.8 m)

Administration
- Council area: Shetland Islands
- Country: Scotland
- Sovereign state: United Kingdom

Demographics
- Population: 0

The Inner Holm of Skaw is a small, uninhabited islet off the northern tip of the island of Whalsay, in the Shetland Islands of Scotland, north of the village of Skaw.

== Location ==
A kayaker may find their way through the rocks between the islet and the headland of Skaw Taing on Whalsay. Further out to sea there is another rocky islet, the Outer Holm of Skaw. The islet has a ruined chapel. In 1955 a pair of Sandwich terns nested on the islet.

== See also ==
- Holm of Skaw
- Outer Holm of Skaw

== Gallery ==
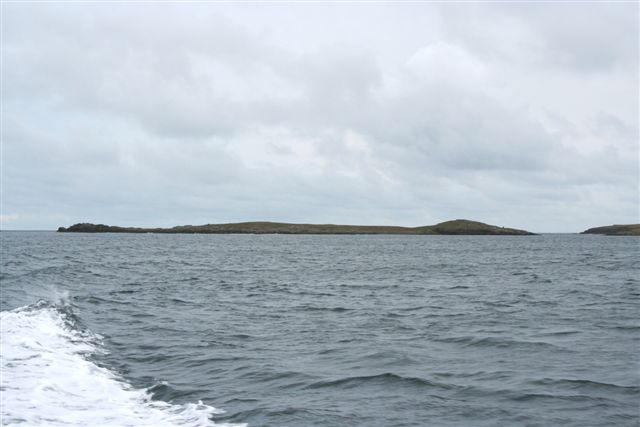
Inner Holm of Skaw

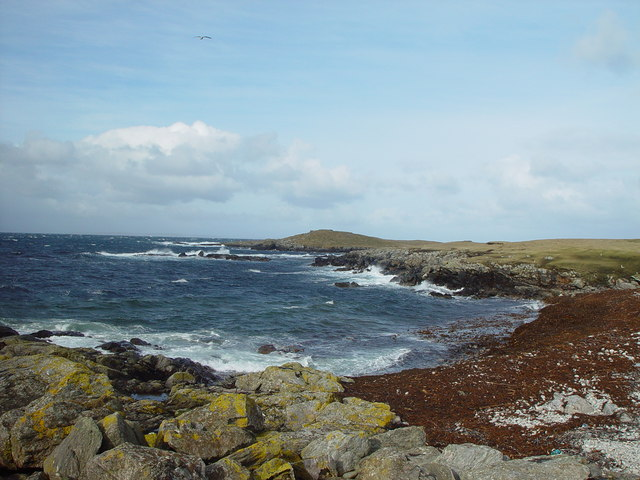
Looking across Wester Netlar to Sponger Point with the Inner Holm of Skaw beyond.
