= Freester =

Coordinates: 60.259°N 1.175°W

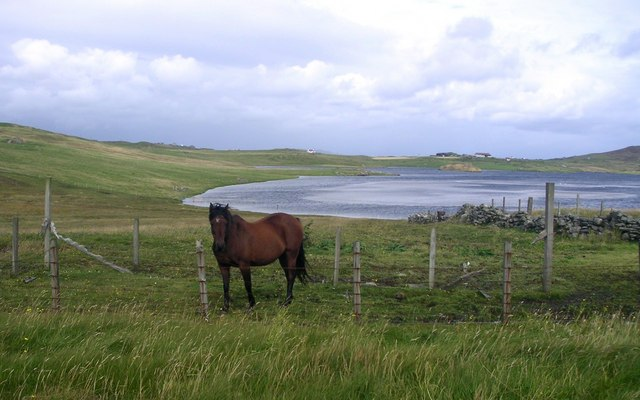
- The west bay of the Loch of Benston viewed from Freester, with a horse in the foreground

- Location within Shetland
- OS grid reference: HU456529
- Civil parish: Nesting
- Council area: Shetland
- Lieutenancy area: Shetland
- Country: Scotland
- Sovereign state: United Kingdom
- Post town: SHETLAND
- Postcode district: ZE2
- Dialling code: 01595
- Police: Scotland
- Fire: Scottish
- Ambulance: Scottish
- UK Parliament: Orkney and Shetland
- Scottish Parliament: Shetland

Freester is a settlement on Mainland, Shetland, Scotland. It is in the parish of Nesting.
