= Brettabister =

Coordinates: 60.299°N 1.131°W

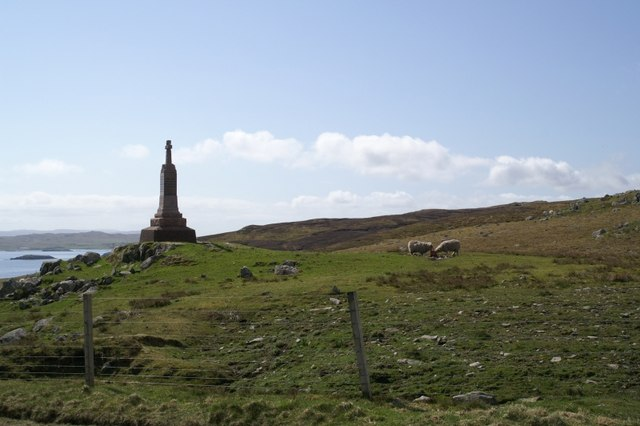
- Nesting War Memorial at Brettabister

- Location within Shetland
- OS grid reference: HU480574
- Civil parish: Nesting
- Council area: Shetland
- Lieutenancy area: Shetland
- Country: Scotland
- Sovereign state: United Kingdom
- Post town: SHETLAND
- Postcode district: ZE2
- Dialling code: 01595
- Police: Scotland
- Fire: Scottish
- Ambulance: Scottish
- UK Parliament: Orkney and Shetland
- Scottish Parliament: Shetland

Brettabister is a settlement on the island of Mainland in Shetland, Scotland. It is in the parish of Nesting. St. Ola's parish church lies to the east, near Houstabister. The war memorial for North Nesting parish is at the centre of Brettabister, adjacent to the B9075 road, opposite the junction with the road to Neap.
