= Billister =

Coordinates: 60.323°N 1.131°W

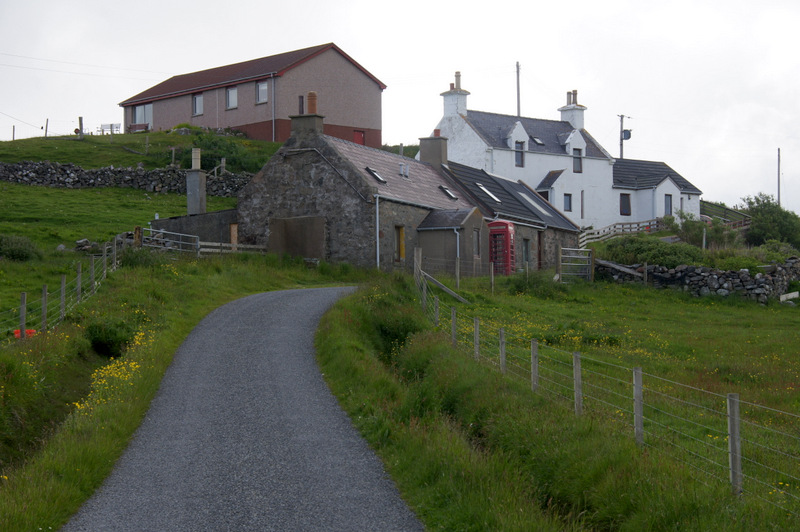
- Three houses of different ages, possibly even built in different centuries

- Location within Shetland
- OS grid reference: HU479601
- Civil parish: Nesting
- Council area: Shetland
- Lieutenancy area: Shetland
- Country: Scotland
- Sovereign state: United Kingdom
- Post town: SHETLAND
- Postcode district: ZE2
- Dialling code: 01595
- Police: Scotland
- Fire: Scottish
- Ambulance: Scottish
- UK Parliament: Orkney and Shetland
- Scottish Parliament: Shetland

Billister (Shaetlan pronunciation: [ˈbɪɫistər] BILL-ee-stər) is a settlement in the parish of Nesting, on the island of Mainland, in Shetland, Scotland. It is on Lax Firth.

Billister was formerly the terminal for the ferry to Whalsay, although this has now moved to Laxo. The pier was built by the council in 1956.
