= Neap =

Coordinates: 60.308°N 1.086°W

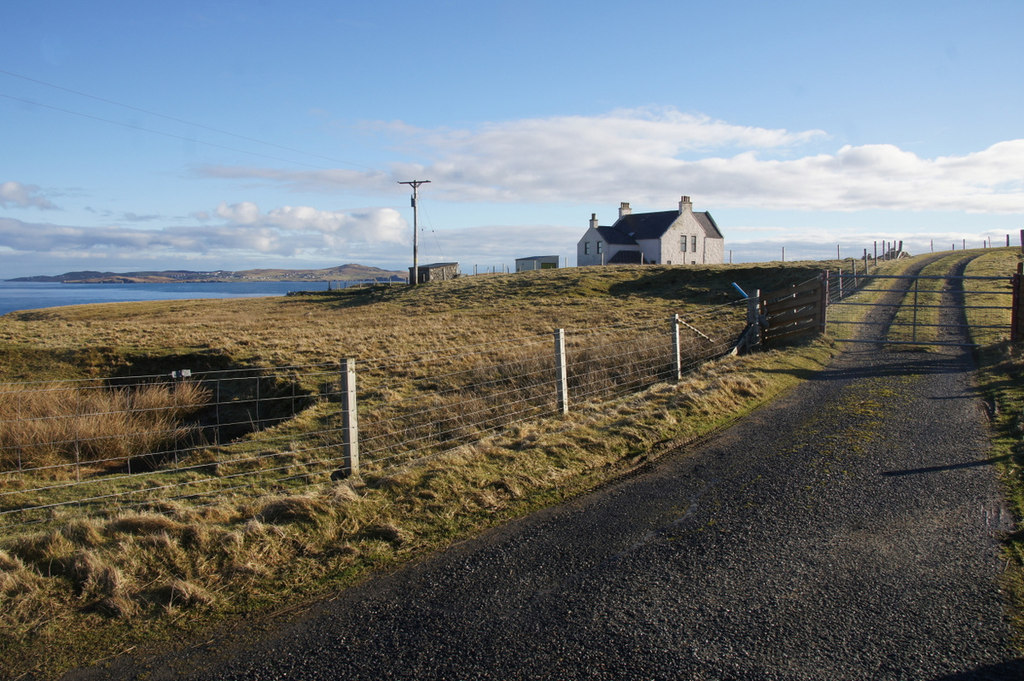
- The road end at Neap

- Location within Shetland
- OS grid reference: HU505584
- Civil parish: Nesting
- Council area: Shetland
- Lieutenancy area: Shetland
- Country: Scotland
- Sovereign state: United Kingdom
- Post town: SHETLAND
- Postcode district: ZE2
- Dialling code: 01595
- Police: Scotland
- Fire: Scottish
- Ambulance: Scottish
- UK Parliament: Orkney and Shetland
- Scottish Parliament: Shetland

Neap is a small village in the east coast of the Mainland of the Shetland Islands, Scotland. Neap is situated at the end of the road from Brettabister, through Housabister and Kirkabister.
