= Benie Hoose =

Neolithic site on Whalsay, Shetland Islands, Scotland

- Benie Hoose location in Whalsay, Shetland
- 60.366721°N 0.938896°W
- Location: Shetland, Scotland

History
- Built: Neolithic age

Benie Hoose, also Bunyie Hoose, is a Neolithic site in the parish of Nesting, northeastern Whalsay, in the Shetland Islands of Scotland. It is located approximately 100 yards (91 m) to the northwest of the Standing Stones of Yoxie, and about 140 metres (460 ft) southeast of the Pettigarths Field Cairns. Benie' is believed to be a local term for 'Bone House' or graveyard or a transliteration of the Old Norse 'Boenhus', which means 'a house of prayer' or chapel. Based on architectural details and its location with respect to Yoxie, a nearby site, it is conjectured that the Benie Hoose was the residence of the priests who were associated with performing worship at the temple at Yoxie. Benie Hoose and Yoxie demonstrate characteristics of 'paired houses'. OS (NKB) visited the site on 30 May 1968. The one-room site measures 24.4 by 12.8 metres (80 ft × 42 ft), and features a horned forecourt.

== Layout ==
The site was excavated in 1954–1955 by Charles S. T. Calder who gave the items to the National Museum of Antiquities of Scotland in 1955–1956.

The Benie Hoose is laid out in the form of a figure of eight, to the southeast of Pettigarths Field, about 30m from the lower hill slopes of Gamla Vord. The front elevation is curved and with a horn shaped courtyard. It has no similarity with other dwelling units but shares identifying features with the Yoxie monument.

The main block is of 80 feet (24 m) length and 40 feet (12 m) width while the forecourt is 32 feet (9.8 m) wide. The main block is set towards the hill. The walls are made of dry stones of 4 metres (13 ft) thickness. There is a 4 metres (13 ft) passage leading from the entrance. The complex has an elaborate drainage system which ensured that the interior remained dry. The floor of the chamber had stone flooring. The forecourt is D-shaped and is conjectured as an animal pen. No stone-made furniture was found, which has led to the conclusion that the furniture must have been made of wood.

== Artifacts ==
The large number of artifacts found at the site attests to the domestic nature of the Benie Hoose. Calder unearthed an unusual quantity of tools indicating there was a dwelling here, possibly a vicary. Artifacts include 33 trough querns used for grinding, and 1,800 implements such as axes, hammer stones, hammer pounders, picks, pot lids, pot shards, steatite (soapstone) pot handle, and a steatite spindle whorl.

Based on architectural details and its location with respect to Yoxie, a nearby site, it is conjectured that the Benie Hoose was the residence of the priests who were associated with performing worship at the temple at Yoxie.

=== Cairns ===
Earlier archaeological explorations carried out at about 140 metres (460 ft) north west of Benie House during 1936 and 1938 have revealed two Pettigarths Field Cairns; the first one is on the south of the site which is square in shape measuring 6 metres (20 ft) with a circular entry of 2 metres (6 ft 7 in), the other carn is a smaller circular one of 4.5 metres (15 ft) diameter with cist in the shape of a rectangle. Both are inferred as tombs of the Late Stone and Early Bronze Ages.
