= Mooa =

Small islet of the Shetland Islands of Scotland

Coordinates: 60.364503°N 0.90003°W

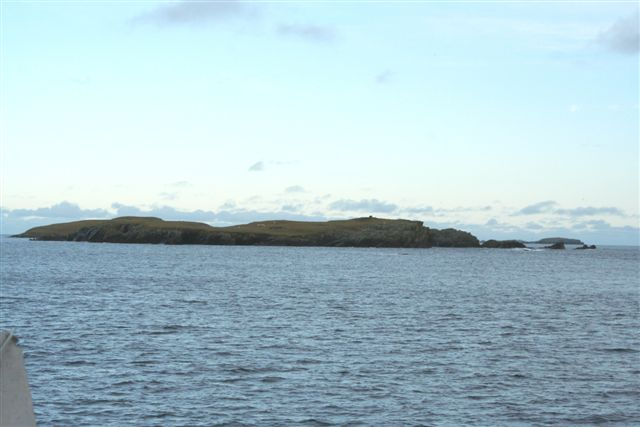
Mooa, viewed from the southwest

Mooa is a small islet of the Shetland Islands of Scotland, situated roughly 2 kilometres (1.2 mi) east off the coast of Whalsay. It lies to the north of Isbister Holm and south of Nista. The highest point of the islet is 63 feet (19 m).
