= Rumble, Shetland =

Skerry in the Shetland islands of Scotland

Coordinates: 60.32639°N 0.905983°W

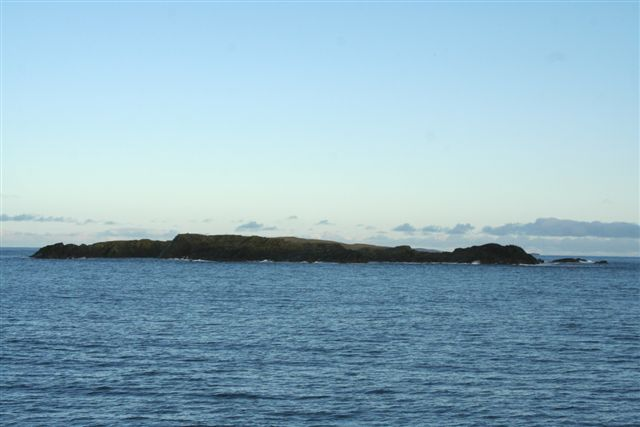
Rumble viewed from the south

Rumble is a skerry in the Shetland islands of Scotland, situated roughly 4 kilometres (2.5 mi) east off the coast of Huxter, southeastern Whalsay. It lies 0.75 miles (1.21 km) to southwest of East Linga. The main island, also known as Rumble Holm, is 27 feet (8.2 m) high. Nearby and to the north are the Flaeshans of Rumble, a series of small islets and stacks and Burlastack of Rumble lies to the east. On the northern side of the main island is an inlet, known as the Voe of Rumble. Lobsters and prawns are said to shelter here. It is also mentioned that a ship named Griften of unknown nationality was shipwrecked either here or on the Holm of Sandwick in 1611.
