= Grif Skerry =

Islet to the east of Whalsay in the Shetland Islands

Coordinates: 60°20′23″N 0°51′30″W

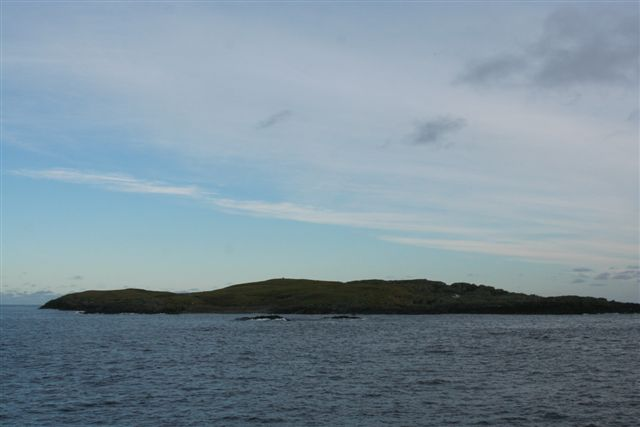
Grif Skerry, viewed from the west

Grif Skerry is an islet to the east of Whalsay in the Shetland Islands. Its name comes from the Norse or Norn for "deep sea skerry".

The island is uninhabited, although there are some buildings on it. These are mostly fishermen's huts, and the remains of a haaf fishing station, so that fishermen could shelter from bad weather.

== Geography and geology ==
There are some caves on the island.

The Swarta (meaning "black") and Longa Skerries are offshore. The nearest island is East Linga, and Whalsay is the nearest large island.
