= East Linga =

One of the Shetland Islands

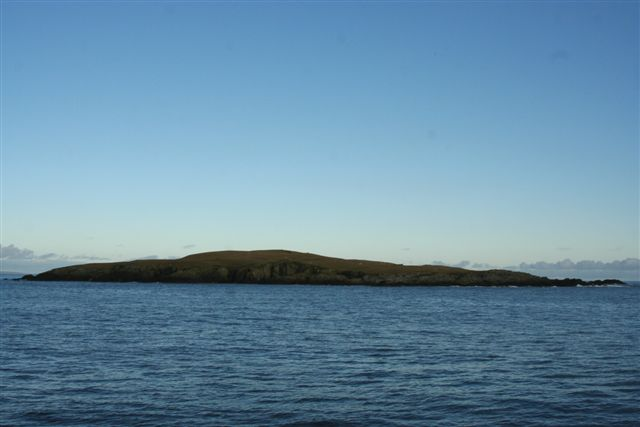
- East Linga viewed from the south

Location
- Location within Shetland
- OS grid reference: HU615623
- Coordinates: 60.34°N 0.88°W

Name
- Name meaning: "east heather island"
- Old Norse name: Possibly Lingey

Physical geography
- Island group: Shetland
- Area: 30 hectares (0.12 sq mi)
- Highest elevation: 27 metres (89 ft)

Administration
- Council area: Shetland
- Country: Scotland
- Sovereign state: United Kingdom

Demographics
- Population: nil

East Linga is one of the Shetland Islands. It lies between Whalsay (to the west), and Grif Skerry to the east.

== Geography and geology ==
The bed rock is gneiss with granite veins.

There are many skerries and rocks in the channel south of Whalsay and East Linga, some of which have disputed names, i.e. one local version, and a different one on Admiralty Charts and/or Ordnance Survey maps. For example, "Muckla Billan" is listed on the latter, but is known locally as "Peerie Fladdacap".

In December 2008 the corpses of eighteen grey seals were discovered on the island, some of them apparently clubbed to death. Police have charged a forty-seven-year-old man in connection with the discovery. According to Scottish Natural Heritage, about thirty grey seals are born on East Linga each year.

The smaller Calf of Linga lies to the north and is connected to East Linga at low tide. West Linga lies on the other side of Whalsay.
