= Standing Stones of Yoxie =

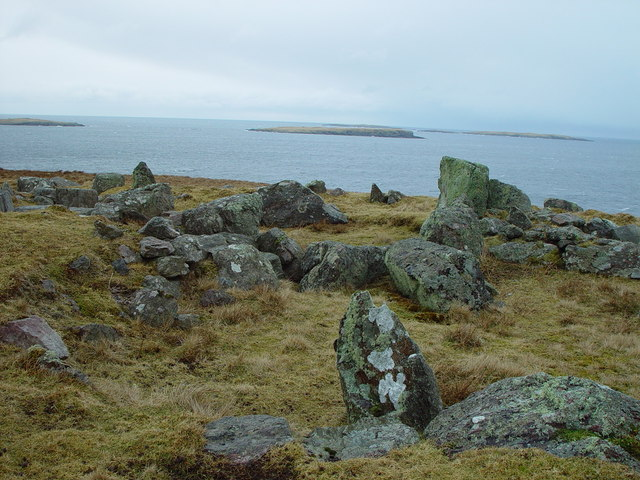
- Standing Stones

- Standing Stones of Yoxie location in Whalsay, Shetland
- 60.36647°N 0.937092°W
- Location: Shetland, Scotland

History
- Built: Neolithic age

The Standing Stones of Yoxie is a Neolithic site in the parish of Nesting on the northeastern coast of Whalsay, in the Shetland islands of Scotland. It is located approximately 100 yards (91 m) to the southeast of Benie Hoose, not far from the steep cliffs of Yoxie Geo. The site is also known as "Yoxie Biggins". The structure is the remains of a building in a Neolithic settlement called Pettigarths Field, about 4,000 years old, which also includes a megalithic tomb and Benie Hoose. The site has been compared to that of Hal Tarxien.

== Layout ==
The earlier assessment that the monument was a standing stone grouping has since been revised. It is now known to consist of a building partitioned into rooms. The "standing stones" name is derived from the fact that the walls were built in part from megaliths, many of them still erect. The building was once about 18 by 11 metres (59 by 36 ft) in size, but little remains of the northern part. There is a main L-shaped block to the west, and a smaller forecourt to the east. There are no traces of door fixtures. A paved passage lined with stone boulders runs through the house, and traces of the paving continue through a circular room that it divides into two recessed sections.

== Usage ==
The site seems to have been occupied for a long period of time. There is a local belief that the stones were used for ceremonies by Druid priests who lived at Benie Hoose – or even that druids still live there. However, the ruins are 4,000 years old. There is no written mention of Druids before around 200 BC, and no reliable sources even from later periods. Despite this the excavator, C.S.T. Calder, interpreted Yoxie as the remains of a temple, and Benie Hoose as a house that may have been used by the priests. He felt there were indications that this structure, and another similar one at Stanydale on Mainland, Shetland, were used for religious purposes. If so, they would have been the first known temples in the British Isles. The placement and layout of the Benie Hoose and Yoxie seem very close to records of temples and priestly dwellings in Malta.

However, early and middle Neolithic society does not appear to have had complex social structures such as a priestly caste. It is now thought that both Yoxie and Benie are prehistoric houses.

== Artifacts ==
Artifacts and material from the early and late Bronze Ages have been found. Some of the finds are Iron Age, while some date to the original Neolithic age settlement and others to a later occupation of the site in Iron Age. Pottery remains have been found in both houses. One large vessel found in Yoxie was very similar to a plain Bipartite Urn, possibly used for storing barley. More than 120 tools made of stone in a crude form have been unearthed in Yoxie.
