= Isbister, Shetland =

Coordinates: 60.359°N 0.952°W

Isbister
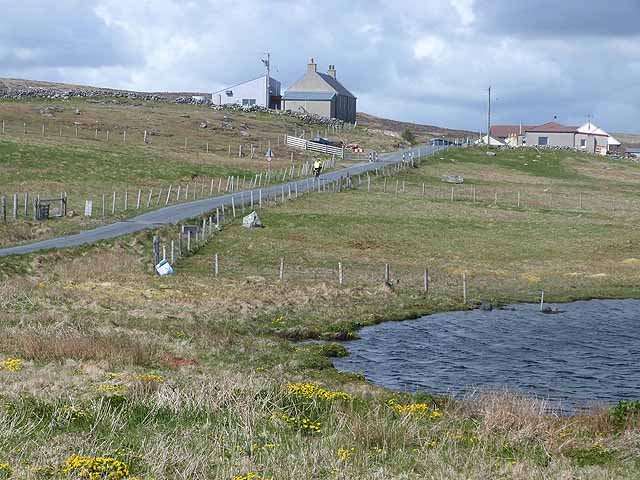
- The southern tip of Isbister Loch, with Isbister in the background

- Location within Shetland
- OS grid reference: HU578642
- Civil parish: Nesting
- Council area: Shetland
- Lieutenancy area: Shetland
- Country: Scotland
- Sovereign state: United Kingdom
- Post town: SHETLAND
- Postcode district: ZE2
- Dialling code: 01806
- Police: Scotland
- Fire: Scottish
- Ambulance: Scottish
- UK Parliament: Orkney and Shetland
- Scottish Parliament: Shetland

Isbister is a settlement in eastern Whalsay in the parish of Nesting in the Shetland islands of Scotland. It lies on the eastern side of Loch of Isbister. There is a small islet about 2 kilometres (1.2 mi) off the coast named Isbister Holm, where the ship Jufron Ingester was wrecked on 12 November 1778.
