= Holm of Skaw =

Small islet off the northeast coast of the island of Unst, Scotland

Location
- Location within Shetland
- Coordinates: 60.832918°N 0.771446°W

Physical geography
- Island group: Shetland
- Highest elevation: 57 feet (17 m)

Administration
- Council area: Shetland Islands
- Country: Scotland
- Sovereign state: United Kingdom

Demographics
- Population: 0

The Holm of Skaw is a small islet off the northeast coast of the island of Unst. It is just northeast of the settlement of Skaw. The island is 57 feet (17 m) in height. There is a small solar-powered unmanned lighthouse on the islet, which is managed and regularly maintained by the Northern Lighthouse Board. Tidal currents are slack between the Holm of Skaw and Herma Ness at high water, and the passage may be made by small boats. The Skaw Röst, a dangerous tidal race, forms off the shore of the Holm of Skaw and Lamba Ness.

== Gallery ==
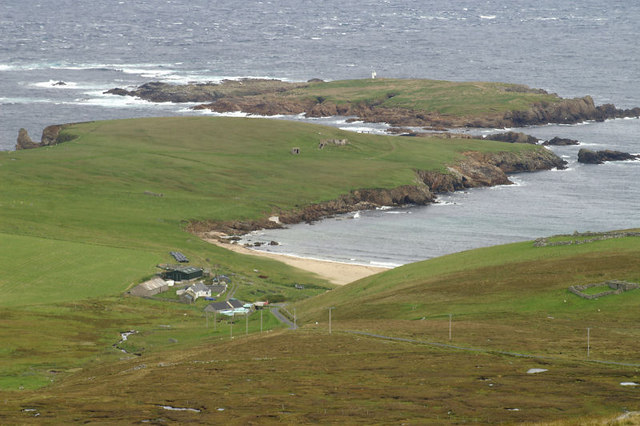
Skaw and the Holm, as seen from the Ward of Norwick. The most northerly house in Britain is visible in the foreground, and the Holm of Skaw beyond.

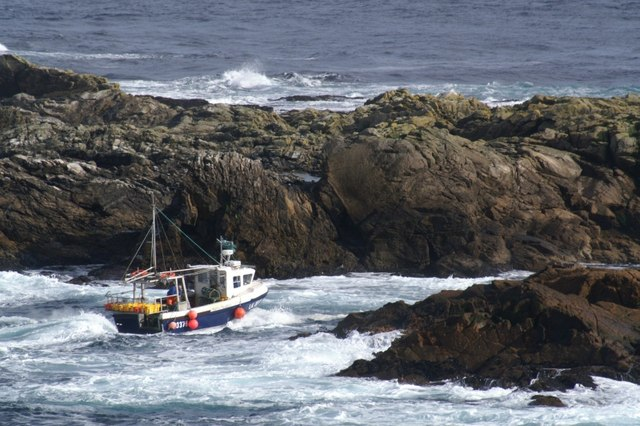
Creel boat in the channel between Holm of Skaw and Inner Flaess.

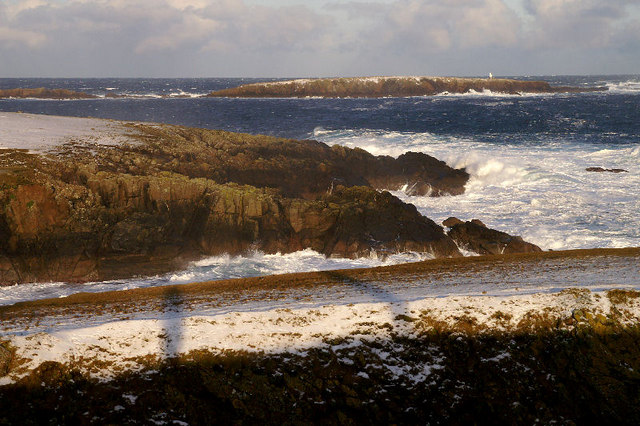
View to Holm of Skaw from Lamba Ness on a cold raw winter's day.

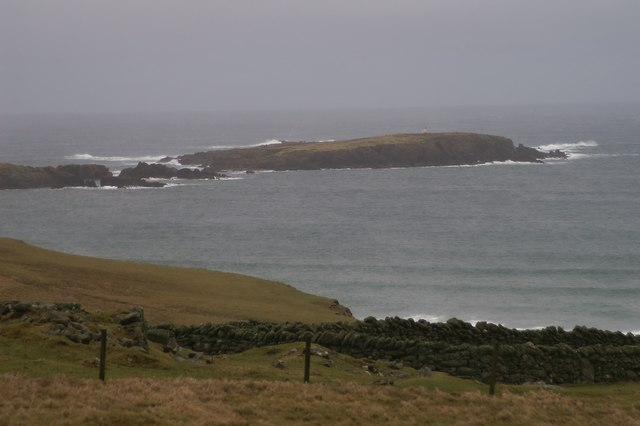
Looking across to the Holm of Skaw.

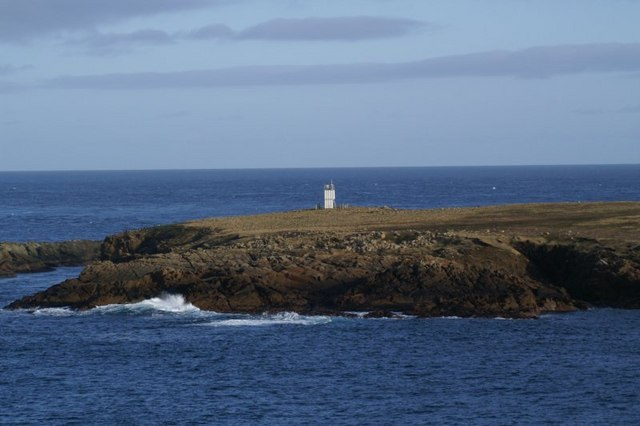
Holm of Skaw From Houlls-nef.

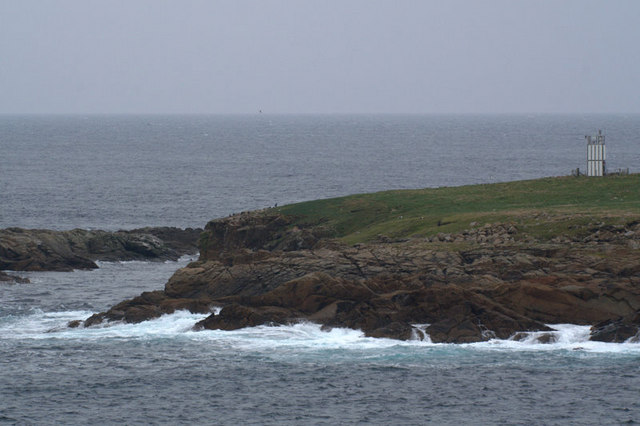
Holm of Skaw. The lighthouse can be seen beside the narrow channel between the Holm of Skaw and Inner Flaess.

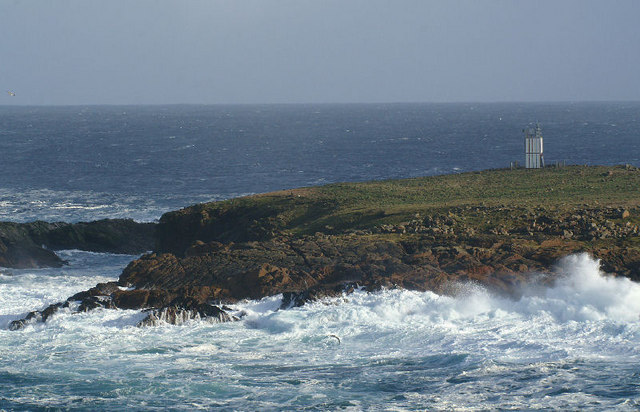
The channel between the Holm of Skaw and Inner Flaess, on the left, often used as a short cut by boats.

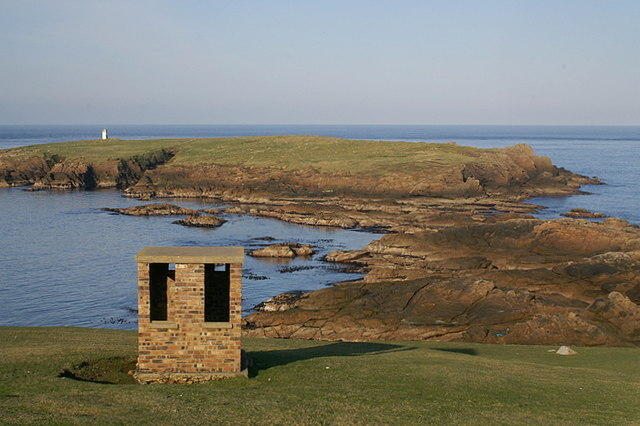
In the foreground is a building from the former RAF Skaw, and in the background is the Holm of Skaw, with its lighthouse. At low tide it seems that it should be possible to walk out to the Holm, but a deep channel runs between jagged rocks.
