= Skate of Marrister =

Flat ledge in the Shetland islands of Scotland

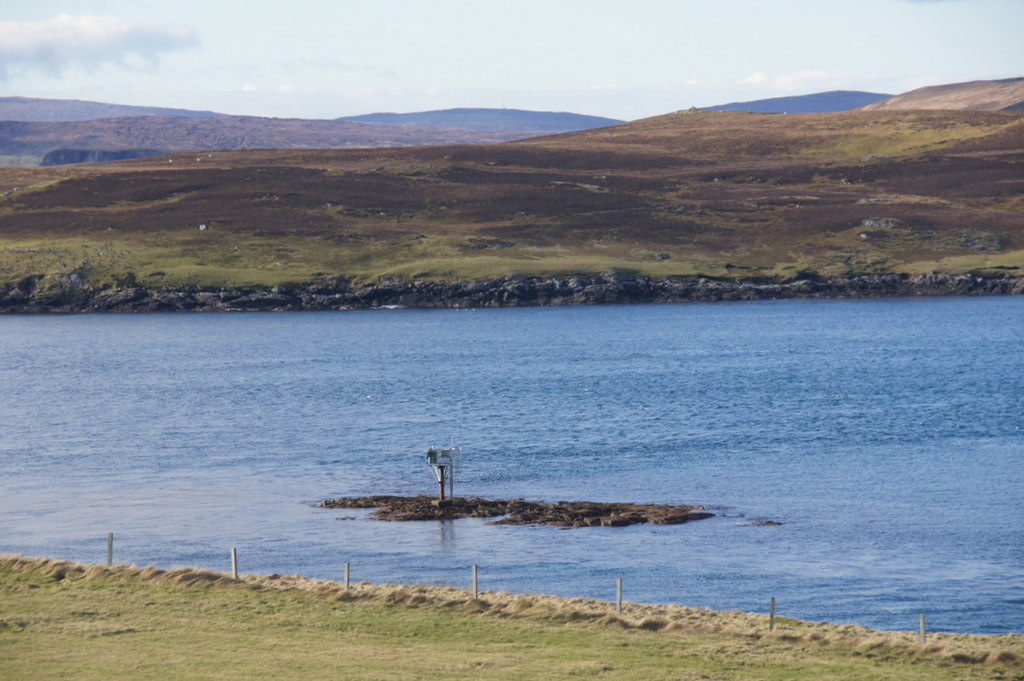
- Skate of Marrister in Linga Sound

Location
- Location within Shetland
- Coordinates: 60.355982°N 1.022866°W

Physical geography
- Island group: Shetland

Administration
- Council area: Shetland Islands
- Country: Scotland
- Sovereign state: United Kingdom

Demographics
- Population: 0

The Skate of Marrister is a flat ledge that extends about 300 yards (270 m) from the western shore of Whalsay, in the Shetland islands of Scotland. It is slightly more than 1 mile (1.6 km) north-north-west of Symbister Ness, off the village of Marrister, in Linga Sound. At low tide the ledge rises 5 feet (1.5 m) above the water. There is a risk that the strong tide in Whalsay Sound (Linga Sound) will carry a boat onto the Skate. There is a minor light on the Skate with a nominal range of four miles, flashing green every six seconds.

Piltock may be caught around the Skate.
