= Outer Holm of Skaw =

Small, uninhabited islet in the Shetland Islands of Scotland

Location
- Location within Shetland
- Coordinates: 60.389079°N 0.905512°W

Physical geography
- Island group: Shetland
- Highest elevation: 14 feet (4.3 m)

Administration
- Council area: Shetland Islands
- Country: Scotland
- Sovereign state: United Kingdom

Demographics
- Population: 0

The Outer Holm of Skaw is a small, uninhabited islet, a rock outlier off the northeast coast of the island of Whalsay, in the Shetland Islands of Scotland.

== Location ==
The Outer Holm of Skaw is 14 feet (4.3 m) high, and is about 0.5 miles (0.80 km) to the north of Skaw Taing on the island of Whalsey. The 32 feet (9.8 m) high Inner Holm of Skaw lies between the Outer Holm of Skaw and Whalsey.

== Gallery ==
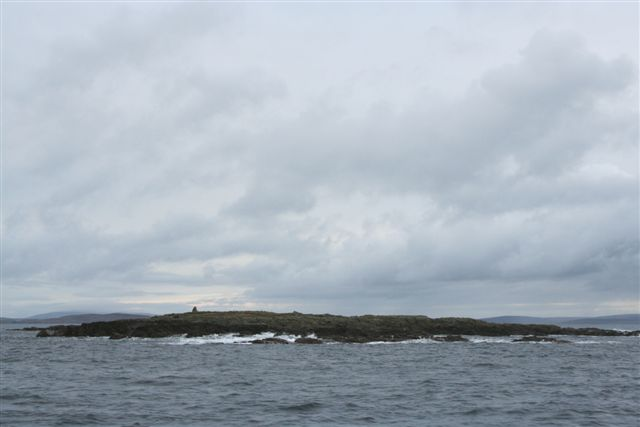
Outer Holm of Skaw

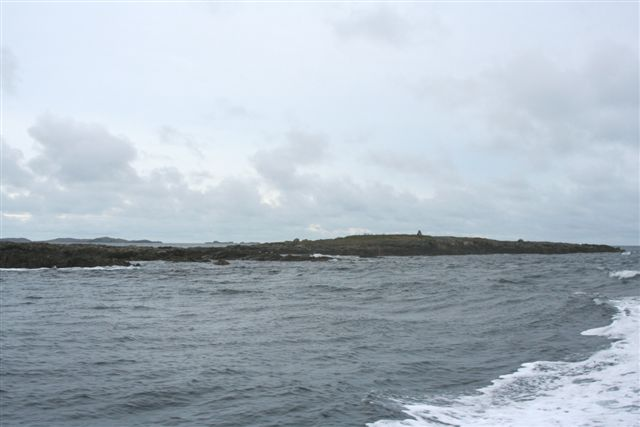
Outer Holm of Skaw
