= Nista =

Small islet of the Shetland Islands of Scotland

Coordinates: 60.368299°N 0.895973°W

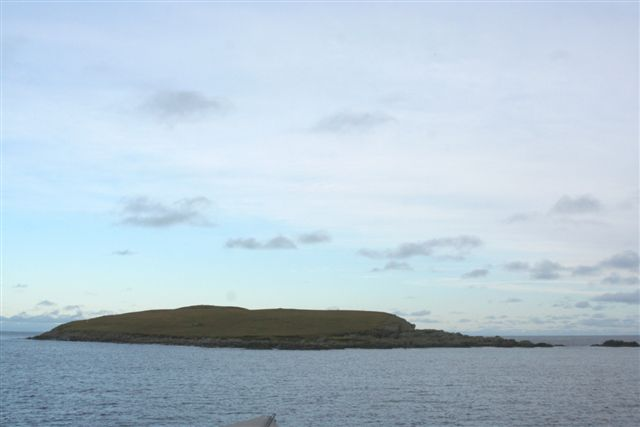
Nista, viewed from the west

Nista is a small islet of the Shetland Islands of Scotland, situated roughly 2 kilometres (1.2 mi) east off the coast of Whalsay. It lies to the north of Mooa.

The Trota Stack lies just off the north side of the islet. The highest point of the islet is 63 feet (19 m).
