= Linga Sound, Shetland =

Strait between Whalsay and West Linga in the Shetland islands of Scotland

Coordinates: 60.36667°N 1.01667°W

Location of Linga Sound

Linga Sound is the strait between the islands of Whalsay and West Linga in the Shetland islands of Scotland.

The sound has a depth of 11 to 12 fathoms (66 to 72 ft; 20 to 22 m). The narrowest width is 900 feet (270 m) between the 6 fathoms (36 ft; 11 m) contours. The sound is the channel most often used by large vessels. The tidal stream running south through the sound starts about four and a half hours before high water at Lerwick, and the stream starts running north about two hours after high water at Lerwick. The maximum rate is 6 knots. The sound has several islets. The most notable is the Skate of Marrister. A lighthouse on Suther Ness below Brough stands at the northern entrance into Linga Sound.

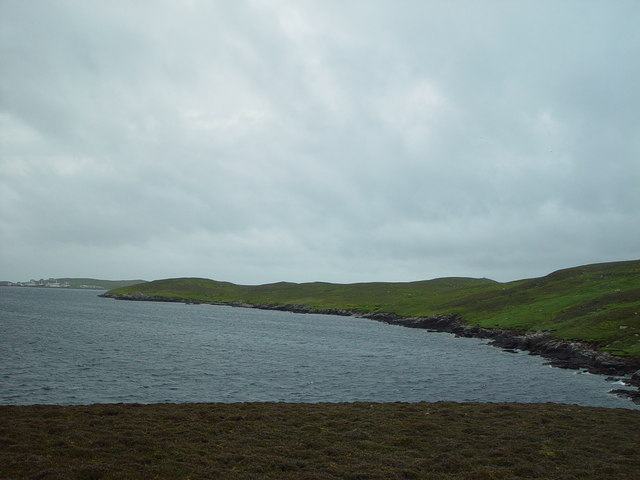
Looking SSW across the Bight of Cudda on the west of the sound towards the Head of Berg on West Linga
