= Loch of Livister =

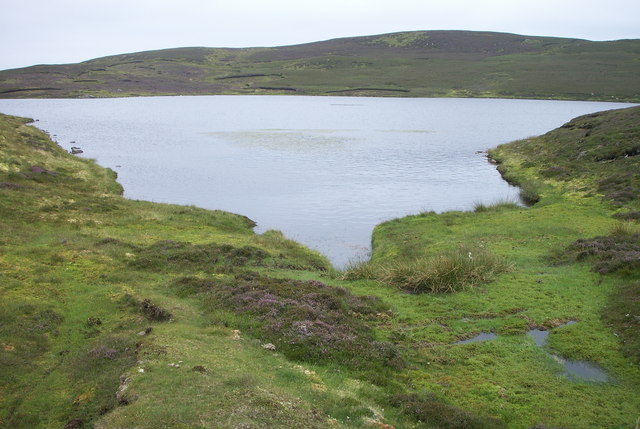
- East side of the Loch of Livister

- Location within Scotland
- Location: Whalsay, Shetland Islands, Scotland
- Coordinates: 60.347479°N 0.990851°W
- Type: loch

Loch of Livister is a loch of southern-central Whalsay, Shetland Islands, Scotland, located to the north of the Loch of Huxter. Though the Loch of Livister is a much smaller loch than the Loch of Huxter, it has richer biodiversity, with Notonectidae, Coleoptera kotifera, and others.
