= Charles S. T. Calder =

Scottish archaeologist

Charles Shaw Tyrie Calder
- Calder 'sweetening' a drawing in 1947. He is adding finishing touches to the survey drawing (prepared with Kenneth Steer) of the broch at Dun An Ruigh Ruadh. Extract of RCAHMS image SC1121381.
- Born: 1 March 1891; Forfar
- Died: December 1972 (aged 81); Auchterarder
- Occupations: Archaeologist, Architect, Architectural Historian, Draughtsman, Surveyor
- Known for: Research into Neolithic sites in Shetland, contribution to work of RCAHMS from 1917–1960, development of survey and depiction techniques for illustration

Charles S. T. Calder (March 1891 – December 1972) was a Scottish archaeologist who undertook extensive explorations from the 1920s to 1950s. He is best known for his explorations of Neolithic cairns and buildings in Shetland in the 1940s and 1950s, although his contribution to the investigative work and publications of RCAHMS during a period of over 40 years service cannot be overstated.

== Early years ==
Charles Shaw Tyrie Calder was born on 1 March 1891 in Forfar, and trained as an architect. In 1914 he joined the Royal Commission on the Ancient and Historical Monuments of Scotland (RCAHMS). Calder joined the Royal Engineers Territorial Force towards the end of World War I. He enlisted on 30 March 1918 and probably trained at Newark-on-Trent, Southwell, and the Curragh in Ireland. He saw some active service in France and Flanders with the 529th (East Riding) Field Company, Royal Engineers, although most of the fighting was over. He was promoted to Lieutenant on 30 September 1919, and soon after was demobilised.

== Archaeologist ==
From the mid-1920s through to the outbreak of World War II, Calder was active in the resurgence of studies of Neolithic sites in Scotland as Investigator in the RCAHMS, as were V. Gordon Childe, Walter Gordon Grant and J Graham Callander, Keeper of the National Museum of Antiquities. By 1931 he had become an Associate of the Edinburgh Architectural Association. In the 1930s he excavated two Iron Age roundhouses on the Calf of Eday, with the help of local men. He excavated other sites on Eday and the Calf of Eday in the late 1930s and prepared the first complete description of the Dwarfie Stane on Hoy.

World War II began in 1939. In 1940 Calder conducted an emergency excavation of a broch in Caithness before it was destroyed to make way for the new airport of RAF Skitten. He found a saddle quern, grain rubbers, dishes, knocking stones, pivot stones, anvils, tether stones, pot lids, pounders and smoothing stones, a pestle and a whorl. There were also fragments of circular querns dating after the Roman period. On 14 January 1941 it was noted that Calder had relinquished his rank as Lieutenant on enlistment into the ranks. The war ended in 1945. In 1949 it was noted that he had retired from the Territorial Army with the rank of Lieutenant (Honorary Captain).

In 1946 Calder was appointed senior investigator by the RCAHMS, and in 1951 principal investigator. He found, excavated and recorded many Neolithic sites in Shetland including the Stanydale Temple on Mainland, Shetland, houses and cairns in Whalsay, and the Sae Breck broch in Esha Ness. Calder explored the Stanydale site in 1949. He thought it was a temple, and the name "Stanydale Temple" has stuck. He thought the design originated from Mediterranean temples. He saw a strong resemblance to these structures, saying, "it is almost impossible not to assume that the Maltese temples are the prototypes from which Stanydale is derived and which solve the question of its purpose." He excavated the Standing Stones of Yoxie and the nearby Benie Hoose in Whalsay, interpreting the Yoxie structure as a temple similar to Stanydale and Benie Hoose as a house that may have been used by the priests.

Calder worked in a period before the Radiocarbon dating technique had been discovered. He was forced to rely on comparison with other buildings, sometimes distant, to estimate ages. His comparison of the Staneydale Temple to Maltese structures, then thought to be from the Bronze Age, is an example. With more accurate tools at the archaeologist's disposal, this is no longer considered a valid approach.

Calder retired in 1960. He died in December 1972.

== Bibliography ==
- Calder, Charles S. T.; Platt, Margery I. (1948). Report on the Excavation of a Broch at Skitten, in the Kilmster District of Caithness.
- Calder, Charles S. T. (1950). Report on the Excavation of a Neolithic Temple at Stanydale in the Parish of Sandsting, Shetland.
- Calder, C. (1961). Excavations in Whalsay, Shetland, 1954–55. Proceedings of the Society of Antiquaries of Scotland, 94, 28–45. Retrieved from http://journals.socantscot.org/index.php/psas/article/view/8603
