= Brough, Shetland =

Brough
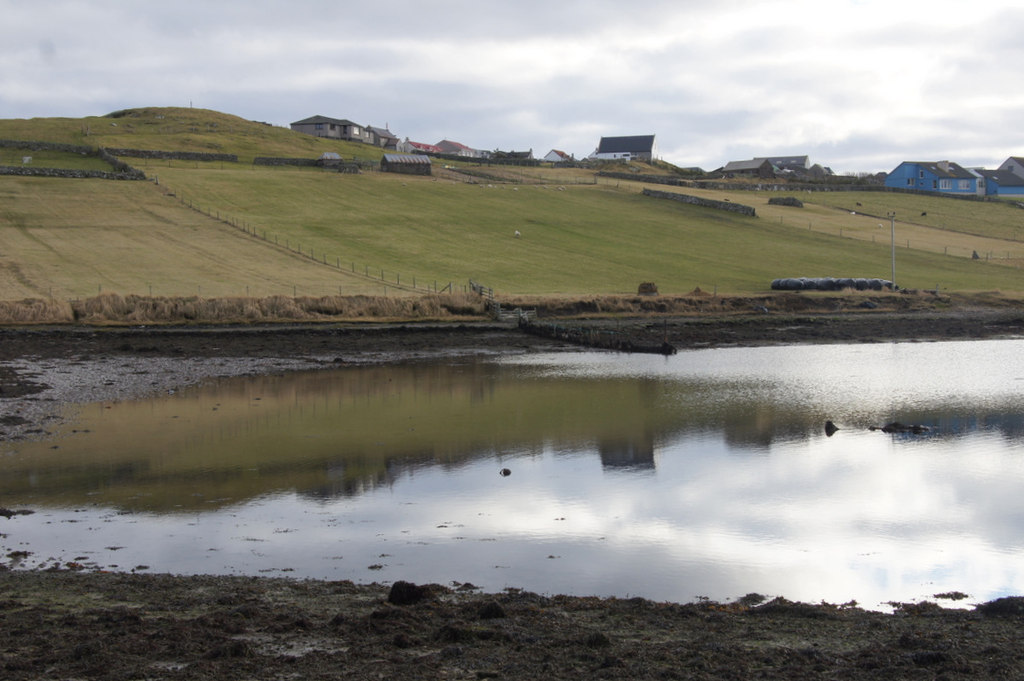
- The Houb, with Brough beyond

- Location within Shetland
- OS grid reference: HU554649
- Civil parish: Nesting
- Council area: Shetland
- Lieutenancy area: Shetland
- Country: Scotland
- Sovereign state: United Kingdom
- Post town: SHETLAND
- Postcode district: ZE2
- Dialling code: 01806
- Police: Scotland
- Fire: Scottish
- Ambulance: Scottish
- UK Parliament: Orkney and Shetland
- Scottish Parliament: Shetland

Brough is a settlement in western Whalsay in the parish of Nesting in the Shetland islands of Scotland. It lies to the southwest of Challister, northeast of New Park, and north of Tripwell. To the north is Kirk Ness, and Whalsay Parish Church.

== History ==
Historically, fishing has been the main source of income in Brough. There is a burnt mound in the south of the village and an old horizontal mill which first appeared on an 1882 map.

== Cup marks ==
A feature here is a hillock with two groups of cup-marks at 60.366164°N 0.994392°W, believed to date to the Bronze Age. The upper group features 10 much-weathered cups, around 2 inches in diameter on average and as deep as an inch in an area of about 18 by 19 inches. The lower group features at least 19 weathered cups, measuring from between 2.5 and 3.5 inches in diameter and 1 to 2 inches deep, in an area of around 18 by 10 inches. There is an isolated cup, about 70 yards to the south.
