= Holm of Sandwick =

Coordinates: 60.329422°N 1.025532°W

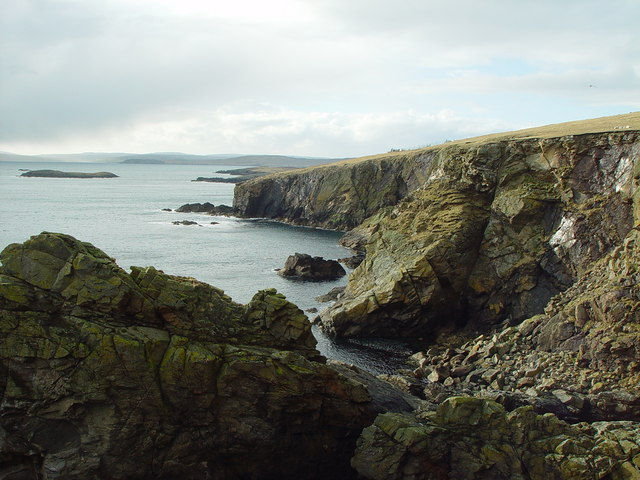
Looking across to Holm of Sandwick (top left) from Clett Head

The Holm of Sandwick is an islet, located roughly 100 metres (330 ft) off Haa Ness and the southwestern side of Whalsay, in the Shetland Islands of Scotland. The small groups of islets to the west are called the Flaeshans of Sandwick. To the southwest is Sava Skerry. It is reported that a ship named Griften of unknown nationality was shipwrecked either here or on Rumble Holm in 1611.
