= West Linga =

Scottish island

Location
- West Linga shown within Shetland
- OS grid reference: HU533651
- Coordinates: 60.36°N 1.0346°W

Name
- Name meaning: (west) heather island
- Old Norse name: lyng-øy

Physical geography
- Island group: Shetland
- Area: 125 hectares (0.48 sq mi)
- Area rank: 133=
- Highest elevation: 52 metres (171 ft)

Administration
- Council area: Shetland Islands
- Country: Scotland
- Sovereign state: United Kingdom

Demographics
- Population: 0

West Linga is an uninhabited island located between Mainland and Whalsay in Shetland, Scotland.

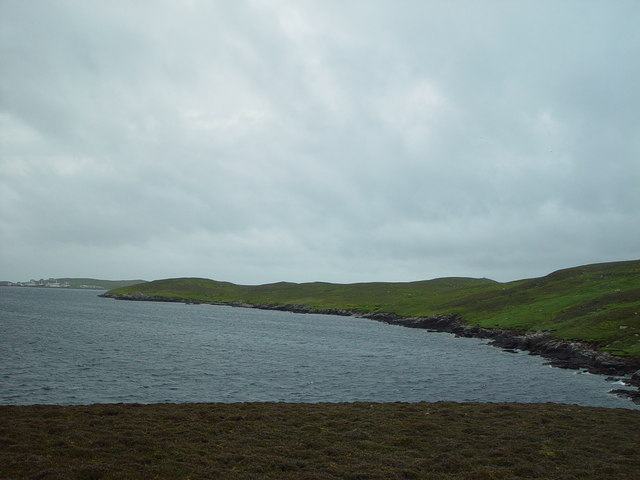
Looking SSW across the Bight of Cudda, West Linga, towards the Head of Berg.

== Geography and geology ==
West Linga is a long narrow island covered in rough heath. It is separated from Whalsay by Linga Sound, and Lunning on Mainland, Shetland to the west. Little Linga, Swarta Skerry, Lona Skerry and Ketill Holm lie to the west. The Calf of Linga to the south is a drying islet. Wether Holm is separated by a 3 metres (10 ft) deep channel at the north end.

There are two lochs, and a natural arch in the north west. The two main hills are at either end - North and South Ward. There is a cairn in the south.

The rock is coarse micaceous, and hornblendic gneiss with granite veins. There is a raised beach above Croo Wick at the southern extremity.

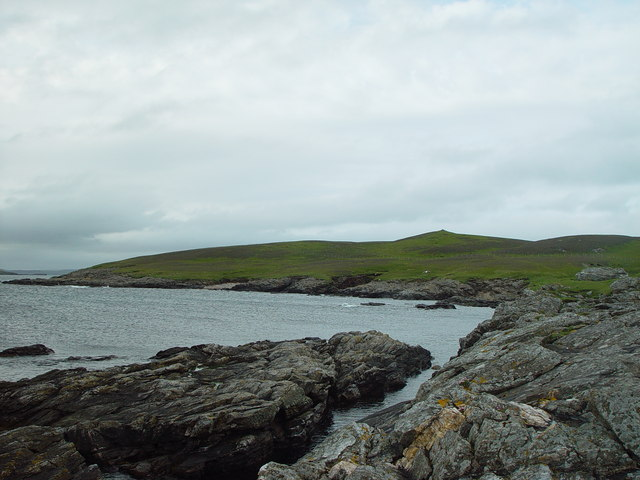
Croo Wick, West Linga

== History ==
West Linga appears to have been inhabited intermittently until the late 18th century. The lack of an anchorage and somewhat brackish water have hindered settlement.

Some acreage on "Liungøuo í Hwalsøyo" is recorded in 1485 for sale for ten marks, as part of an illegal land sale, at Holy Cross Church near Bergen in Norway.

Hugh MacDiarmid who lived on nearby Whalsay, said in The Uncanny Scot that he had spent three days on the island, living in a cave, with many matches and two books. In fact it transpired that he'd been there only for a few hours. One of MacDiarmid's best known poems was On a Raised Beach.
