= Nesting, Shetland =

Parish in the Shetland Islands, Scotland

Coordinates: 60°18′N 1°8′W

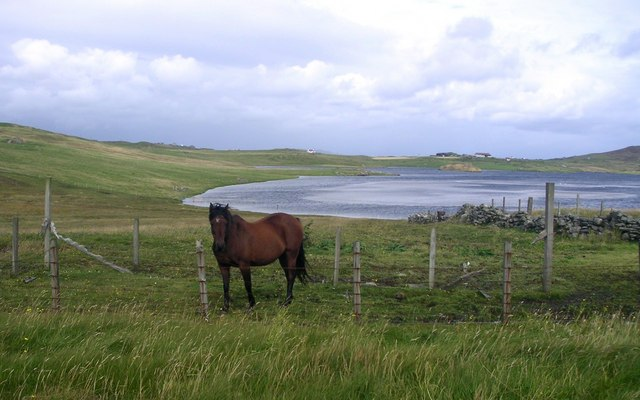
Loch of Benston

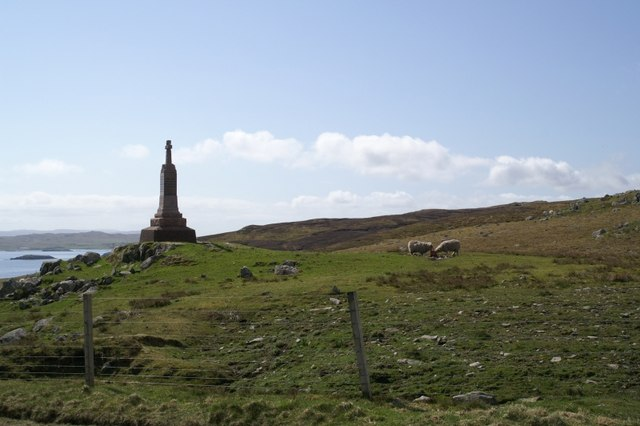
Nesting War Memorial

Nesting is a parish in the Shetland Islands, Scotland. It includes a part of the east Shetland Mainland, measuring about twelve by four miles (19 by 6 kilometres), along the seaboard from Gletness to Lunna Ness, and also the island of Whalsay and the Out Skerries. The coast is deeply indented by voes and headlands. The arable land comprises only about 1,000 acres (400 hectares), the remainder being mostly open moorland. The total area is given as 105.6 km^{2} (41 sq mi; 26,094 acres). This includes the ancient parish of Lunnasting in the North and the island parish of Whalsay to the east, which were added to Nesting in 1891. Before that, the ancient parishes of North Nesting and South Nesting were merged.

The parish church, St Ola's Kirk, stands approximately 10 miles (16 km) north of Lerwick near the war memorial at Brettabister.

Nesting is divided into a north and south districts. The population in 1958 was 1549.

Settlements in Nesting include:

- Benston (South Nesting)
- Billister (North Nesting)
- Brettabister (North Nesting)
- Catfirth (South Nesting)
- Dury (North Nesting)
- Freester (South Nesting)
- Gletness (South Nesting), including North and South Isles of Gletness
- Kirkabister (North Nesting)
- Laxfirth (North Nesting)
- Skellister (South Nesting)

The main village of Whalsay is Symbister and there are several notable Neolithic sites on the island, including Benie Hoose, the Standing Stones of Yoxie, and the Pettigarths Field Cairns.

== Notable residents ==
- James Stout Angus was from Nesting.
- Alexander Levie born and raised here.
