= List of places in Shetland =

Map of places in Shetland compiled from this list

The List of places in Shetland is a list for any island, town, village or hamlet in the Shetland Islands council area of Scotland.

Source: www.shetlopedia.com/Shetland_Settlements

== A ==
- Aith
- Aithsetter
- Aywick

== B ==
- Baliasta
- Baltasound
- Bardister
- Basta
- Belmont
- Benston
- Biggings
- Bigton
- Billister
- Bixter
- Boddam
- Brae
- Braehoulland
- Braewick
- Braewick
- Breakon
- Brettabister
- Bridge End
- Bridge of Walls
- Brindister
- Brindister
- Brough
- Brough Lodge
- Browland
- Buness
- Burnside
- Burra Voe
- Burrafirth
- Burraland
- Burrastow
- Burravoe
- Burwick
- Busta

== C ==
- Caldback
- Camb
- Catfirth
- Challister
- Channerwick
- Clivocast
- Clothan
- Clousta
- Collafirth
- Colvister
- Copister
- Cullivoe
- Culswick
- Cumlewick
- Cunningsburgh
- Cunnister
- Cutts

== D ==
- Dale of Walls
- Dalsetter
- Delting
- Dunrossness
- Dury

== E ==
- East Burrafirth
- East Hogaland
- East Yell
- Easter Quarff
- Easter Skeld
- Effirth
- Eswick
- Everton
- Exnaboe

== F ==
- Firth
- Fladdabister
- Freester
- Funzie

== G ==
- Garderhouse
- Garth
- Girlsta
- Gletness
- Gloup
- Gluss
- Gonfirth
- Gossabrough
- Gott
- Graven
- Greenbank
- Grimister
- Grindiscol
- Grunasound
- Gruting
- Grutness
- Gulberwick
- Gunnista
- Gunnister
- Gutcher

== H ==
- Hadd
- Haggersta
- Haggrister
- Ham
- Hamnavoe
- Haroldswick
- Heglibister
- Hellister
- Heogan
- Heylor
- Hillock
- Hillside
- Hillswick
- Hillwell
- Holmsgarth
- Hoswick
- Houbie
- Houlland (near Bixter)
- Houlland (Sandwick)
- Houlland (Scalloway)
- Houlland (Yell)
- Housetter
- Houss
- Houss Ness
- Huxter

== I ==
- Ireland
- Isbister
- Islesburgh

== K ==
- Kettlester
- Kirkabister

== L ==
- Laxfirth
- Laxo
- Leebitton
- Lerwick
- Levenwick
- Lund
- Lunna
- Lunning
- Lunnister

== M ==
- Mail
- Mangaster
- Marrister
- Maryfield
- Maywick
- Melby
- Mid Yell
- Mossbank
- Murrister

== N ==
- Neap
- Newgord
- Nibon
- Noness
- Noonsbrough
- Norby
- North Collafirth
- North Roe
- North Sandwick
- Northpunds
- Norwick
- Noss, Mainland Shetland
- Isle of Noss

== O ==
- Ocraquoy
- Oddsta
- Ollaberry
- Otterswick

== P ==
- Papil

== Q ==
- Quarff
- Quendale
- Quoys

== R ==
- Reawick
- Rerwick
- Roesound
- Ronas Voe

== S ==
- Sand
- Sandness
- Sandsound
- Sandwick (Mainland)
- Sandwick (Whalsay)
- Scalloway
- Scarff
- Scatness
- Scatsta
- Scousburgh
- Selivoe
- Sellafirth
- Semblister
- Setter
- Silwick
- Skarpigarth
- Skaw
- Skaw
- Skelberry
- Skeld
- Skellister
- Sound
- South Collafirth
- South Garth
- South Scousburgh
- South Whiteness
- Southpunds
- Stanydale
- Starkigarth
- Stebbligrind
- Stenness
- Stonganess
- Stonybreck
- Stove
- Sudheim
- Sullom
- Sumburgh Head
- Sweening
- Symbister

== T ==
- Tangwick
- Tingwall
- Toab
- Toft
- Trebister
- Tresta
- Trondavoe
- Turniebrae
- Twatt

== U ==
- Ulsta
- Underhoull
- Unifirth
- Uppersound
- Uradale
- Urafirth
- Ure
- Uyeasound

== V ==
- Vaivoe
- Valsgarth
- Vatsetter
- Veensgarth
- Vidlin
- Virkie
- Voe, village at head of Olna Firth
- Voe, settlement on Northmavine peninsula

== W ==
- Wadbister
- Wallacetown
- Walls
- Weisdale
- West Burrafirth
- West Heogaland
- West Sandwick
- West Yell
- Wester Quarff
- Wester Skeld
- Westerfield
- Westerwick
- Westing
- Wethersta
- Whiteness

== Z ==
- Zoar

== See also ==
- List of places in Scotland
- List of islands of Scotland
- List of Shetland islands
