= List of populated places in Shetland =

A list of populated places in the Shetland Islands:

== A ==
- Aith
- Aithsetter
- Assater
- Aywick

== B ==
- Baltasound
- Basta
- Belmont
- Biggings
- Bigton
- Billister
- Bixter
- Boddam
- Bousta
- Brae
- Braehoulland
- Braewick
- Breiwick
- Bremirehoull
- Brettabister
- Bridge End
- Bridge of Walls
- Brindister
- Brough, Bressay
- Brough, South Nesting
- Brough, Whalsay
- Browland
- Burrafirth
- Burrastow
- Burravoe

== C ==
- Catfirth
- Challister
- Channerwick
- Clate
- Clivocast
- Clousta
- Copister
- Cready Knowe
- Cullivoe
- Cunningsburgh
- Cutts

== D ==
- Duncansclett

== E ==
- East Burrafirth
- Effirth
- Esha Ness
- Exnaboe

== F ==
- Firth
- Fladdabister
- Freester
- Fetlar

== G ==
- Garth, South Nesting
- Girlsta
- Gletness
- Gloup
- Gluss
- Gonfirth
- Gossabrough
- Gruting
- Grutness
- Gulberwick
- Gunnista
- Gutcher

== H ==
- Ham, Bressay
- Hamister
- Hamnavoe
- Haroldswick
- Heogan
- Heylor
- Hillock
- Hillswick
- Hoswick
- Housay
- Huxter

== I ==
- Ireland
- Isbister, Northmavine
- Isbister

== K ==
- Kirkabister, Bressay

== L ==
- Laxo
- Leebitton
- Lerwick
- Levenwick
- Livister
- Lunna
- Lunning

== M ==
- Mail
- Marrister
- Maywick
- Melby
- Mid Yell
- Mossbank
- Muckle Roe

== N ==
- Neap
- Nesbister
- Netherton
- New Park
- Nibon
- Noonsbrough
- North Park
- North Roe
- Norwick

== O ==
- Ocraquoy
- Ollaberry
- Otterswick

== P ==
- Papil

== Q ==
- Quarff
- Quendale

== R ==
- Reawick
- Rerwick

== S ==
- Saltness
- Sandgarth
- Sandness
- Sandwick, Dunrossness, Mainland
- Sandwick, Whalsay
- Sanick
- Scalloway
- Scatness
- Scousburgh
- Sellafirth
- Silwick
- Skaw, Whalsay
- Skaw, Unst
- Skeld
- Skellister
- Skerries
- Sodom
- Sound, Lerwick
- Sound, Weisdale
- South Scousburgh
- South Whiteness
- Stenness
- Sumburgh
- Swining
- Symbister

== T ==
- Tangwick
- Tingwall
- Toab
- Toft
- Tresta, Bixter
- Tresta, Fetlar
- Tripwell
- Turniebrae
- Twatt

== U ==
- Ulsta
- Urafirth
- Uyeasound, Aithsting
- Uyeasound

== V ==
- Vaila
- Vaivoe
- Vats-houll
- Vassa
- Vatsetter
- Veensgarth
- Vidlin
- Voe, in Delting
- Voe, in Northmavine
- Voxter

== W ==
- Wadbister, Girlsta
- Walls
- Weisdale
- West Burrafirth
- West Sandwick
- Westerfield
- Westerwick
- Westing
- Whiteness
- Wormadale

== Former settlements ==
- Aith, Bressay
- Brew Settlement
- Cullingsburgh
- Garth, Dunrossness
- Grimsetter
- Gunnister
- Hoversta, Bressay
- Kebister
- Treawick
- Wadbister, Bressay
