= List of Sites of Special Scientific Interest in Shetland =

The following is a list of Sites of Special Scientific Interest in the Shetland Area of Search. They can be found by searching on the NatureScot/NàdarAlba SiteLink website. For other areas, see List of SSSIs by Area of Search.

- Aith Meadows and Burn of Aith
- Balta
- Breckon
- Burn of Lunklet
- Burn of Valayre
- Catfirth
- Clothister Hill Quarry
- Crussa Field and The Heogs (Note: Crussa Field is a now uninhabited area on the island of Unst. The Heogs are two peaks adjacent to it.)
- Culswick Marsh
- Dales Voe
- Dalsetter (Note: Dalsetter is situated on the south Shetland Mainland, and is an important breeding site for the Arctic tern.)
- East Mires and Lumbister (Note: East Mires and Lumbister SSSI is an area of blanket bog situated on Yell.)
- Easter Loch
- Easter Rova Head (Note: Easter Rova Head SSSI includes the headland of Rova Head north of Lerwick on the Shetland Mainland as well as the island of Easter Rova Head.)
- Eshaness Coast
- Fair Isle (Note: The whole of Fair Isle is designated a SSSI despite being (sparsely) inhabitated.)
- Fidlar Geo to Watsness
- Foula
- Foula Coast (Note: The citation of Foula Coast SSSI indicates an overlap with Foula SSSI: "Most of Foula Coast SSSI is designated as part of Foula SSSI")
- Fugla Ness - North Roe (Note: Fugla Ness - North Roe SSSI is designated a SSSI because of the geological features of Fulga Ness, which is situated on the North Roe of the Mainland of Shetland.)
- Funzie
- Graveland (Note: Graveland SSSI is on the west side of Yell. A large part is blanket bog and it is an important breeding site for the red-throated diver.)
- Gutcher
- Ham Ness
- Hascosay (Note: Part of the now uninhabitated island of Hascosay is designated a SSSI.)
- Hermaness
- Hill of Colvadale and Sobul
- Keen of Hamar (Note: The Keen of Hamar is also designated a Special Area of Conservation (SAC).)
- Lamb Hoga
- Laxo Burn
- Loch of Clousta
- Loch of Girlsta
- Lochs of Kirkigarth and Bardister (Note: Lochs of Kirkigarth and Bardister SSSI refers to two adjacent lochs near to Walls on the Shetland Mainland distinctive for their aquatic plants.)
- Lochs of Spiggie and Brow
- Lochs of Tingwall and Asta
- Lunda Wick
- Melby (Note: Melby SSSI covers sea cliffs in the northwest of Shetland Mainland. It does not include the hamlet of Melby which is nearby.)
- Mousa (Note: The whole of the island of Mousa is designated a SSSI due to its populations of common seals and seabirds.)
- Muckle Roe Meadows (Note: Muckle Roe Meadows SSSI is situated on the Shetland island of Muckle Roe but only covers a small area of it.)
- Ness of Clousta - The Brigs
- Ness of Cullivoe (Note: The Ness of Cullivoe SSSI is situated near Cullivoe on the island of Yell.)
- North Fetlar (Note: North Fetlar SSSI covers much of the north of the island of Fetlar as well as some smaller surrounding islands.)
- North Roe Meadow
- North Sandwick
- Norwick
- Norwick Meadows
- Noss
- Otterswick
- Papa Stour
- Pool of Virkie
- Punds to Wick of Hagdale
- Quendale
- Qui Ness to Pund Stacks
- Quoys of Garth
- Ramna Stacks and Gruney (Note: Ramna Stacks and Gruney SSSI comprises the island of Gruney and the archipelago of Ramna Stacks to the north of Mainland Shetland. They are an important breeding location for the common guillemot and the Leach's petrel.)
- Ronas Hill - North Roe (Note: Ronas Hill - North Roe SSSI includes Ronas Hill the highest point in Shetland.)
- Sandness Coast
- Sandwater
- Saxa Vord (Note: Saxa Vord SSSI is situated on Unst east of Saxa Vord hill, the highest point on Unst.)
- Sel Ayre
- Skelda Ness
- Skeo Taing to Clugan
- South Whiteness (Note: South Whiteness SSSI is situated on the Whiteness peninsula of Mainland Shetland near the village of Whiteness which is not part of it.)
- St Ninian's Tombolo (Note: St Ninian's Tombolo SSSI is a tombolo connecting St Ninian's Isle to the coast of the Shetland Mainland.)
- Sumburgh Head
- The Ayres of Swinister
- The Cletts, Exnaboe (Note: The Cletts, Exnaboe SSSI is a section of coastline of Mainland Shetland near the village of Exnaboe noted for its geological features.)
- The Vadills
- Tingon
- Tressa Ness to Colbinstoft
- Trona Mires
- Uyea, North Roe Coast
- Valla Field
- Villains Of Hamnavoe
- Virva
- Voxter Voe and Valayre Quarry
- Ward of Culswick
- Yell Sound Coast (Note: Yell Sound Coast SSSI covers a number of areas in the Sound of Yell between the Mainland of Shetland and the island of Yell. It overlaps in part with The Ayres of Swinster SSSI.)
