= A968 road =

Road in Scotland

A968

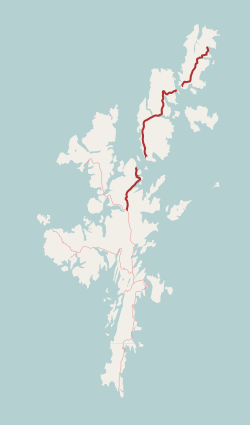

Route information
- Length: 41.9 mi (67.4 km)

Major junctions
- North end: Haroldswick
- A970
- South end: Voe A970

Location
- Country: United Kingdom
- Constituent country: Scotland
- Primary destinations: Yell and Unst islands

Road network
- Roads in the United Kingdom; Motorways; A and B road zones

The A968 in Shetland is the United Kingdom's northernmost A-road. It connects the islands of Yell and Unst to the island of Mainland. The road is actually separated into three. The length of the part of the road on Mainland is 9.8 miles (15.8 km), on Yell 17.4 miles (28.0 km), and on Unst 10 miles (16 km). The road is marked red on most maps and goes from the A970 on Mainland to Haroldswick. It is 41.9 miles (67.4 km) long.

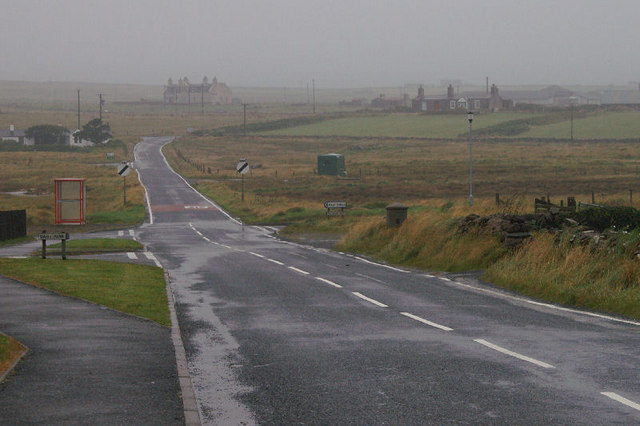
The A968 at Baltasound

== Ferries ==
=== Mainland to Yell ===
The Yell Sound Ferry sails from Ulsta on the island to Toft on Shetland Mainland. The service is operated by two ferries—Daggri (Norse for "dawn"), launched in 2003, and Dagalien (Norse for "dusk"), launched in 2004. These vessels, built in Gdańsk in Poland, can each carry 31 cars or 4 trucks, as well as 95 passengers. The crossing takes approximately 20 minutes, and ferries leave around every half-hour at peak times.

=== Yell to Unst ===
The Bluemull Sound Ferry sails from Gutcher on Yell to Belmont on Unst and Hamars Ness on Fetlar. The ferries travel to Unst approximately every half-hour during the day, and to Fetlar a few times every day. The journey to Unst takes ten minutes, while travelling to Fetlar takes 25 minutes. The service is operated by Bigga and Geira.

== History ==
The A968 was originally on the Mainland of Shetland but it was extended across to the Island of Yell using the B9080 and then extended to Unst, taking over most of the B9085 and B9084 route during the 1930s. The A968's route across Yell then swapped with the B9081 and B9082 at a later date.

== Route ==
Connecting roads are shown in Italics. From Voe to Haroldswick the road passes through the following places:

- Voe A970
- Sullom Voe Terminal B9076

Ferry Connection to Yell

- Ulsta
- Windhouse B908
- Camb
- Colvister
- Sellafirth
- Gutcher B9082 for B9083

Ferry Connection to Unst

- Belmont
- Caldback
- Baltasound For Unst Airport
- Haroldswick B9086 and B9087
