= North Isles =

Northern islands of the Shetland Islands, Scotland

Coordinates: 60°40′N 1°0′W

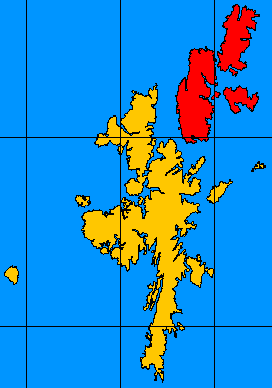
Shetland Islands with North Isles highlighted in red

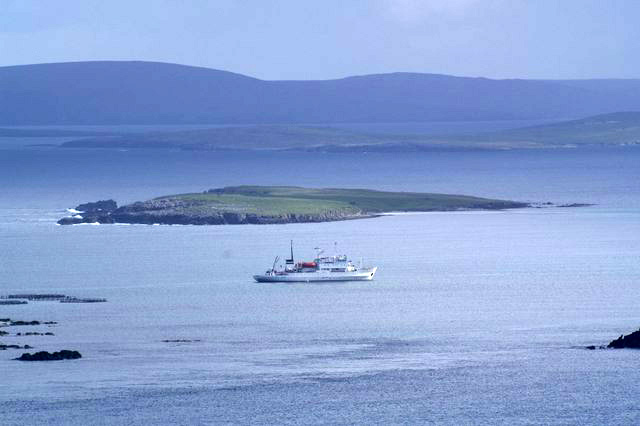
Huney from Unst, and some other North Isles

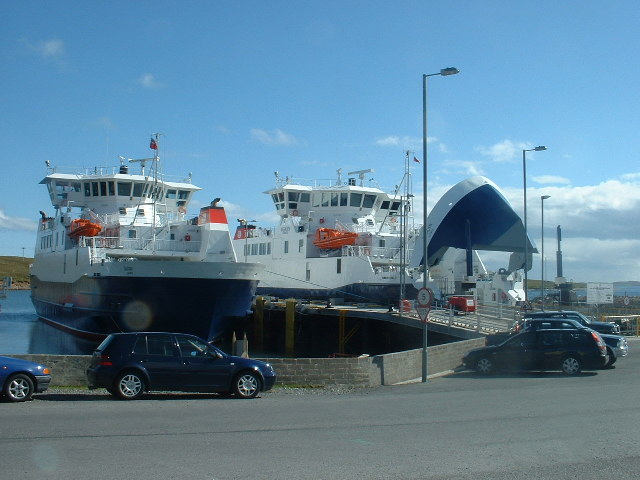
Daggri (dawn) and Dagalien (dusk) at Ulsta. These are ferries that run between Toft on Mainland and Yell

The North Isles are the northern islands of the Shetland Islands, Scotland. The main islands in the group are Yell, Unst and Fetlar. Sometimes the islands in Yell Sound are included in this group.

== Importance ==
They are a significant group, since Yell and Unst are the second and third largest islands in the archipelago, and also the third and fourth most populous (Whalsay, which is not in the group, is the second most populous). Combined, their total land area is far larger than the rest of the Shetland Islands (excluding Mainland) combined.

== Extreme points ==
The group also contains the most northerly land of the United Kingdom and Shetland at Out Stack near Muckle Flugga, and its most northerly settlement Skaw on Unst. These also happen to be the most northerly British territorial claims currently in existence, since Canadian independence. In similar fashion, Britain's most northerly maritime claims are also based on these islands, having great effect on its fishing and oil industries.

Fetlar also contains some of the most easterly points of Scotland with the exception of the Out Skerries, and much of Fetlar and Unst are under 350 km from Norway.

Travellers do not encounter any further land masses between Out Stack and the North Pole if heading directly north.

Other British records include -

- Most northerly castle Muness Castle
- Most northerly post office – formerly Haroldswick now Baltasound
- Most northerly lighthouse – Muckle Flugga
- Most northerly road
- Most northerly brewery – Valhalla Brewery
- Most northerly coastline – Hermanness
- Most northerly church – Haroldswick Methodist Church
- Most northerly ferry route – Gutcher (Yell) to Belmont (Unst)
- Most northerly "wood" – near Baltasound

== Ferries ==
The regular ferries are the most northerly scheduled routes in the British Isles (excluding those going to the Faroes and Iceland). They operate between Yell and Unst, Yell and Fetlar and Yell and Mainland.
