= Voe =

A voe is an inlet in the Shetland islands of Scotland.

Voe or VOE may refer to:

== Places ==
- Voe, Delting, a village in the civil parish of Delting, Shetland
- Voe, Northmavine, a settlement in the civil parish of Northmavine, Shetland
- Burra Voe, a voe on Yell, Shetland
  - Burravoe, a settlement on Burra Voe
- Ronas Voe, a voe in Northmavine, Shetland
- Sullom Voe, a voe between Delting and Northmavine
  - Sullom Voe Terminal

== People ==
- Sandra Voe (born 1936), Scottish actress
- M. M. De Voe, American author
- Emilie Marie Nereng (born 1995), Norwegian blogger and musician also known as "Voe"

== VOE ==
- Verification of employment, check made by American banks and mortgage lenders
- VOE, ICAO code for Volotea, a Spanish low-cost airline
- Vacuum Operated Exhaust, an option for the 1970 Pontiac GTO automobile

== See also ==
- Heinrich Voes (died 1523), Belgian monk and martyr
