= Linga, Bluemull Sound =

Uninhabited island in the Bluemull Sound, Shetland, Scotland

Linga
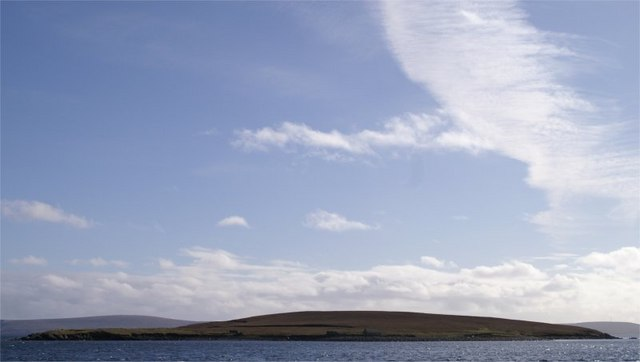
- Linga from the north

Location
- Linga shown within Shetland
- OS grid reference: HU557986
- Coordinates: 60.66°N 1.0°W

Name
- Name meaning: Heather Island
- Old Norse name: Lyngey

Physical geography
- Island group: Shetland
- Area: 45 ha (111 acres)
- Area rank: 210=
- Highest elevation: 26 m (85 ft)

Administration
- Council area: Shetland
- Country: Scotland
- Sovereign state: United Kingdom

Demographics
- Population: 0

Linga is a small uninhabited island in the Bluemull Sound, Shetland, Scotland. It is one of many islands in Shetland called Linga. It has an area of 45 ha and is 26m at its highest point.

== Geography and geology ==
Linga is made up of "coarse mica-schist and gneiss."

It is situated off the east coast of Yell, near the village of Gutcher, and has an area of 111 acres (0.45 km^{2}). It is separated from Yell by Linga Sound, and Unst is to the northeast. Sound Gruney and Urie Lingey are to the southeast, and Hascosay is to the south.

There is little freshwater on the island.

== History ==
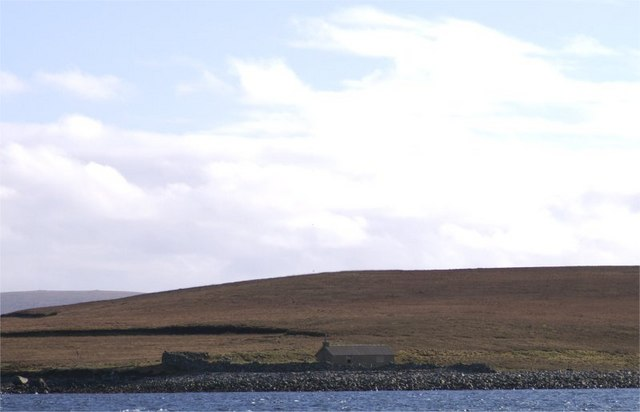
A hut in the north of the island.

It is said that Jan Tait of Fetlar once kept a bear on the island, and this is commemorated in the placename - "Bear's Bait." It was said to be from Norway, where he had been taken for a murder trial, but he was pardoned for capturing this particular bear, which had been causing problems over there.

An abandoned chapel is located on the island. After buying land, an unknown duke once planned to build a large house there. However, this was cancelled as doctors and other services refused to provide services to such a small, remote island.

On 19 July 1923, the SS Jane ran aground on the island. The 840-ton ship, carrying herring from Baltasound, Unst, to Lerwick, later sank into 20m of water just off the island.

There are also the remains of a sheep fold in the north.

== Wildlife ==
Surprisingly for an island whose name derives from the Norse for "heather isle," very little grows here.

Otters, guillemots and seals breed on the island.
