= Brindister =

Brindister may refer to the following places on Mainland, Shetland, Scotland:

- Brindister, South Mainland
- Brindister, West Mainland
