= Burra Ness Broch =

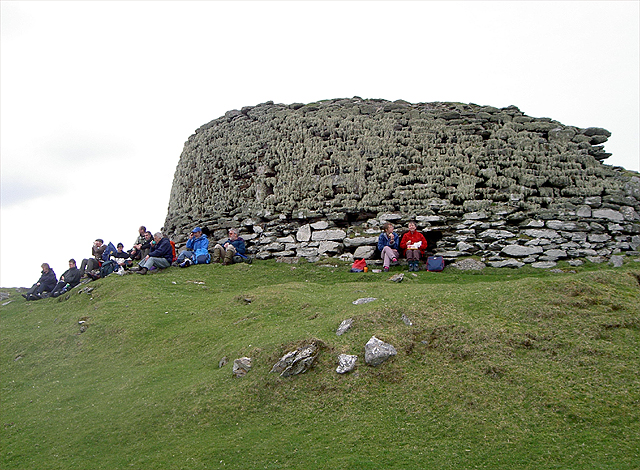
- Burra Ness Broch

- Burra Ness Broch shown within Shetland, Scotland
- 60.640926°N 0.982976°W
- Type: Broch
- Periods: Iron Age
- Location: Yell, Shetland

Site notes
- Public access: Yes

Scheduled monument
- Official name: Burra Ness, broch, Yell
- Designated: 31 May 1934
- Reference no.: SM2063

Burra Ness Broch is an iron-age broch located on the east coast of the island of Yell, Shetland, Scotland.

== Location ==
Burra Ness Broch (grid reference HU55729572) is situated 2.6 kilometres south of the small village of Gutcher on the tip of the headland of Burra Ness. It can be reached by a path south from the settlement of North Sandwick.

== Description ==
The broch has an external diameter of about 18 metres. The outer wall is around 4.5 metres thick, and stands over 4 metres high on the east side. Two hundred years ago the broch is reported to have been 20 feet (6.1 metres) high, and the beginning of a bell-shaped profile was clearly visible. Internally a "scarcement" ledge to support an upper floor is visible some 4 metres above the ground. There are signs of an upper intramural gallery, and there are traces of intramural "guard cell" on the southeast side but no remains of the entrance can be seen. There are traces of outbuildings towards the north, south and southeast, and slight indications of surrounding ramparts.

The ruins of a later farm can be seen about 100 metres to the south.
