= Mid Yell =

Coordinates: 60.599°N 1.067°W

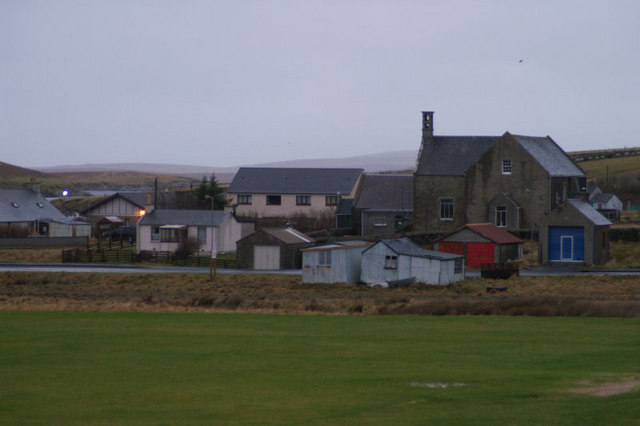
- The church and surrounding housing in December 2007

- Location within Shetland
- OS grid reference: HU511910
  - Edinburgh: 330 mi (531 km)
  - London: 629 mi (1,012 km)
- Civil parish: Yell
- Council area: Shetland
- Lieutenancy area: Shetland
- Country: Scotland
- Sovereign state: United Kingdom
- Post town: SHETLAND
- Postcode district: ZE2
- Dialling code: 01957
- Police: Scotland
- Fire: Scottish
- Ambulance: Scottish
- UK Parliament: Orkney and Shetland
- Scottish Parliament: Shetland

Mid Yell is a coastal settlement on the island Yell, the second-largest of Shetland Islands, Scotland.

Mid Yell, the largest settlement on the island, is at the head of Mid Yell Voe on the B9081 road about 1 mile (1.6 km) from its junction with the A968 road.
