= Vaivoe =

Coordinates: 60.378°N 0.958°W

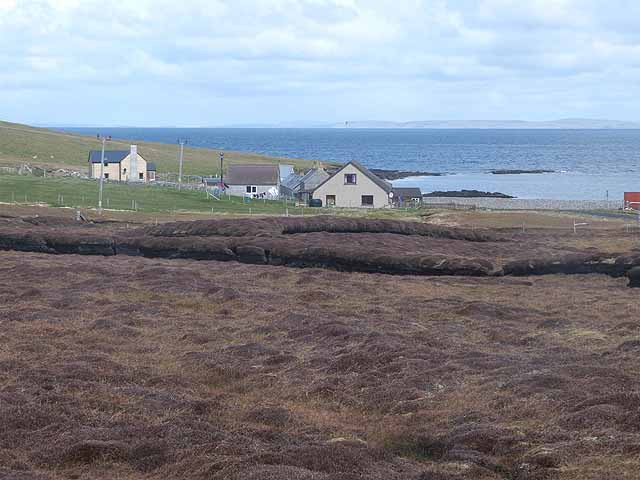
- Houses at Vaivoe

- Location within Shetland
- OS grid reference: HU575664
- Civil parish: Nesting
- Council area: Shetland
- Lieutenancy area: Shetland
- Country: Scotland
- Sovereign state: United Kingdom
- Post town: SHETLAND
- Postcode district: ZE2
- Dialling code: 01806
- Police: Scotland
- Fire: Scottish
- Ambulance: Scottish
- UK Parliament: Orkney and Shetland
- Scottish Parliament: Shetland

Vaivoe is a hamlet in the northwestern Whalsay in the parish of Nesting in the Shetland Islands of Scotland. It overlooks the bay of Vai Voe, just to the southeast of Challister Ness and northwest of the Ward of Challister.
