= Basta, Shetland =

Hamlet on the island of Yell in the Shetland islands of Scotland

Coordinates: 60.629°N 1.046°W

Basta
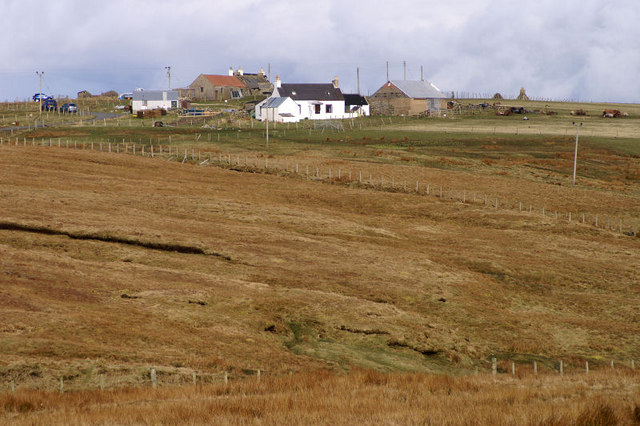
- Basta, Shetland

- Location within Shetland
- OS grid reference: HU521942
- Civil parish: Yell
- Council area: Shetland
- Lieutenancy area: Shetland
- Country: Scotland
- Sovereign state: United Kingdom
- Post town: SHETLAND
- Postcode district: ZE
- Dialling code: 01957
- Police: Scotland
- Fire: Scottish
- Ambulance: Scottish
- UK Parliament: Orkney and Shetland
- Scottish Parliament: Shetland

Basta is a hamlet on the island of Yell in the Shetland islands of Scotland. It is on the shores of Basta Voe and is in the parish of Yell.
