= Old Haa Museum =

Museum in Shetland, Scotland

Coordinates: 60.4958°N 1.0554°W

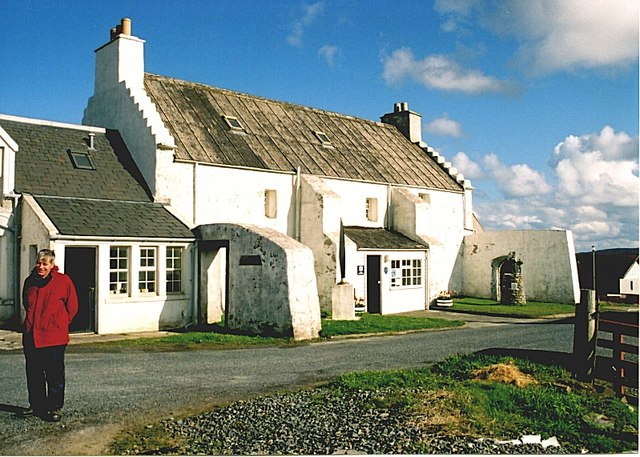
- Location: Burravoe, Yell, Shetland
- Type: Local and Natural History
- Website: www.oldhaa.com

The Old Haa of Brough is a museum, tearoom and garden in located in Burravoe, Yell, Shetland, Scotland. Built for Robert Tyrie, a merchant, in 1672, houses the local museum for Burravoe and Yell.

== History ==
The building was constructed for the Tyrie family in 1672. The original courtyard was demolished. The building was registered as a listed building on 13 August 1971. The Old Haa Trust was formed in 1984, who acquired the building with the intention of turning it into a museum.

== Collections ==
Old Haa Museum has rooms on Natural History, culture and the history of Yell as well as a gallery with regularly changing exhibitions by artists and craftspeople. The museum's collections also include a piano partially paid for by Sir Walter Scott, thought to be the oldest musical instrument in Shetland.

On 19 January 1942, a PBY Catalina aircraft crashed on the hill above Burravoe. Seven of her 10 passengers were killed, and one of the propellers can be seen outside the Old Haa Museum.

The garden features a number of stone landmarks known as Inuksuks.

There is a memorial to Bobby Tulloch at the museum. Bobby Tulloch was a renowned tour guide, wildlife photographer and ornithologist from Yell. He was also known for his books, song writing and music. In addition, the image archive contains a large number of photographs taken by Tulloch. The archive also includes Davie Arthur glass plate negatives and the Maxwell Bruce collection. In total, the photographic collection contains over 16,000 images. The museum also holds a large sound archive.

== Sources ==
- This article is based on http://shetlopedia.com/Old_Haa_Museum a GFDL wiki.
