= Ern Stack =

Coordinates: 60°38′55″N 1°10′20″W

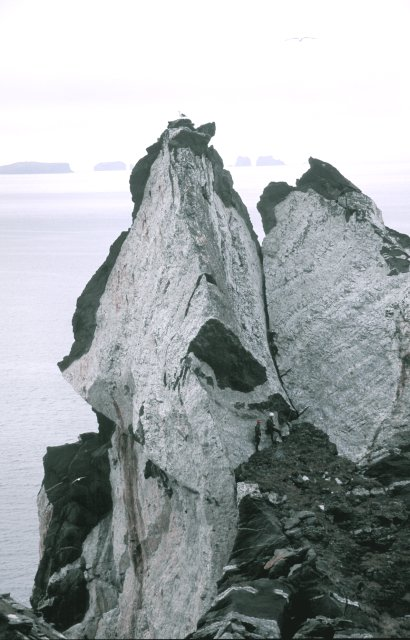

Ern Stack is a sea stack off Yell, in Shetland, Scotland.

The word "ern" means an eagle (it is a cognate of, for example, Swedish "örn"), and it is said that the Eigg, and Ern Stack in the north west of Yell, were the last known nesting site of Shetland sea eagles, which were recorded there in 1910.
