= Sound, Lerwick =

Coordinates: 60.144°N 1.174°W

Sound
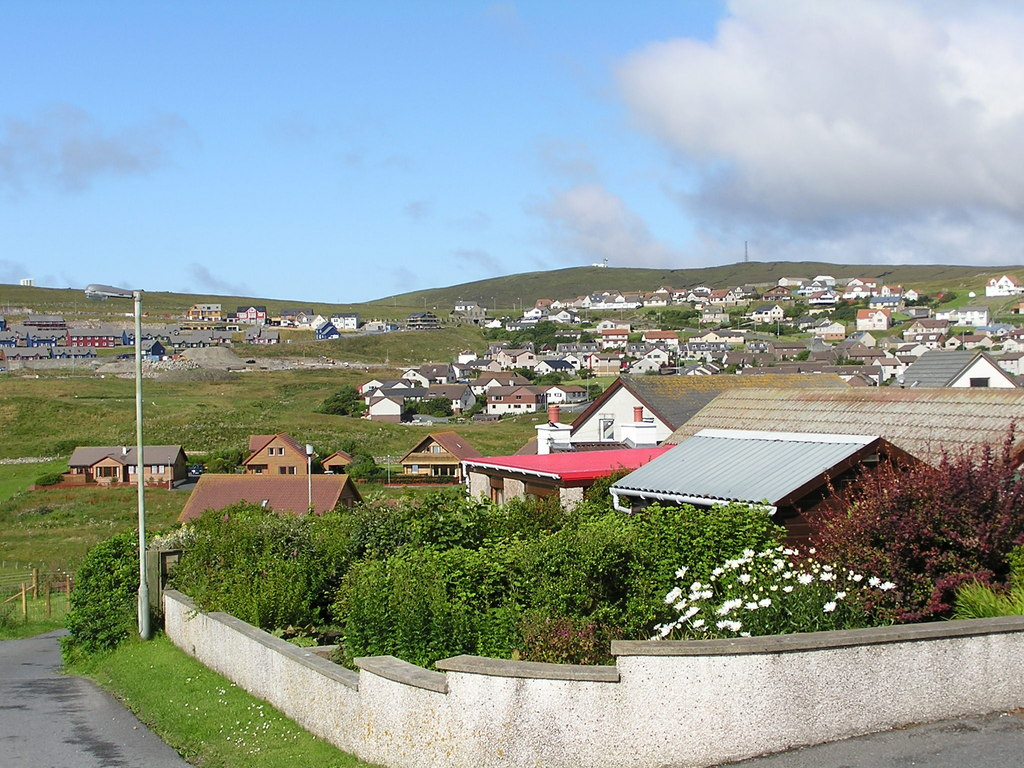
- Sound, Lerwick, looking towards the Sound Brae

- Location within Shetland
- OS grid reference: HU458401
- Civil parish: Lerwick
- Council area: Shetland
- Lieutenancy area: Shetland
- Country: Scotland
- Sovereign state: United Kingdom
- Post town: SHETLAND
- Postcode district: ZE1
- Dialling code: 01595
- Police: Scotland
- Fire: Scottish
- Ambulance: Scottish
- UK Parliament: Orkney and Shetland
- Scottish Parliament: Shetland

Sound is an area situated to the south-west of central Lerwick, the capital of Shetland, Scotland.

Sound is home to a primary school, public hall, and gospel hall; all of the same name. The area is also home to the Sands of Sound beach.

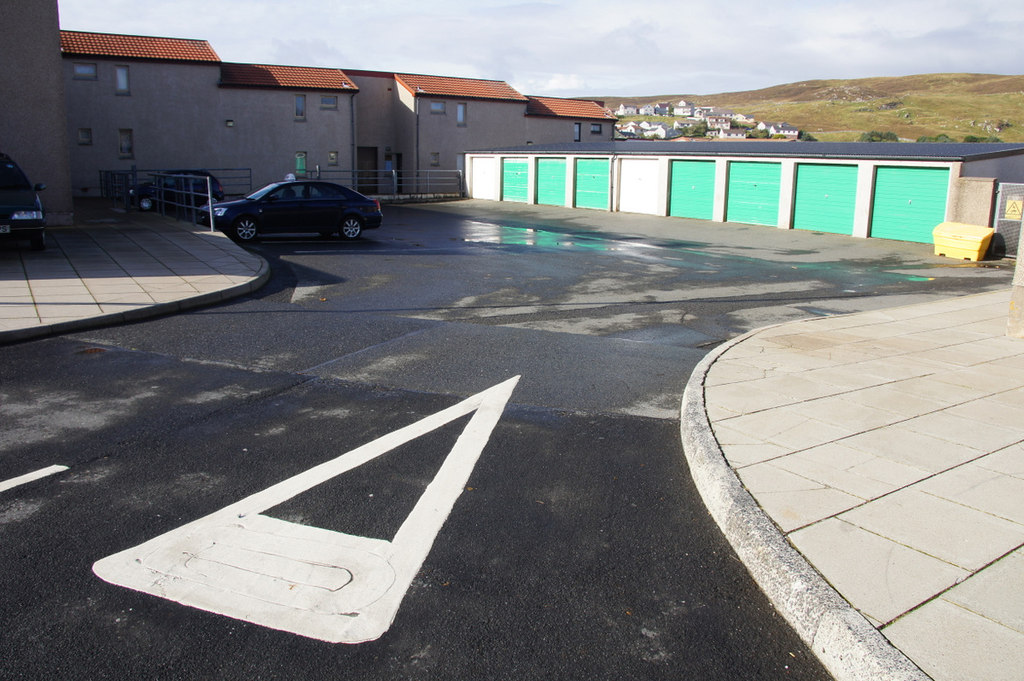
One of Sandveien’s parking areas overshadowed by Staney Hill

Sound is also notable for its varied styles of neighbourhoods including the ‘Concrete Jungle’ like housing estates of Sandveien and Nederdale, the duplex filled streets of Murrayston and Oversund and the many cottage neighbourhoods such as Westerloch and Baila.

== History ==
Before the oil boom of the 1970s, Sound was a sparsely populated area, consisting of a few small settlements to the south and west of Clickimin Loch.

With the discovery of oil in the North Sea, the population increase of Shetland, and in particular Lerwick, necessitated the construction of council estates in the Sound area. With the advent of the neighbourhoods of Sandveien and Nederdale as well as an increased population elsewhere, the number of school age children had grown too large for Lerwick's only primary school to sustain. This led to the opening of Sound Primary School in 1977.
