= Westerfield, Shetland =

Coordinates: 60.246°N 1.359°W

Westerfield
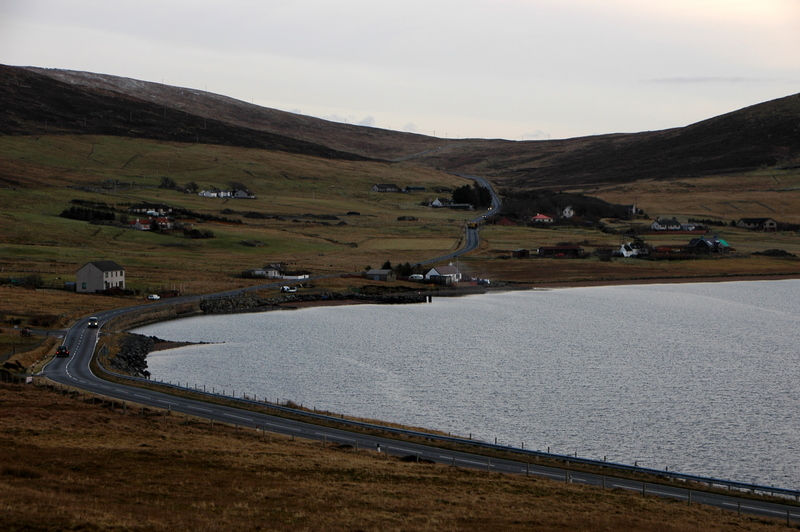
- The shoreline of Tresta Voe at Westerfield

- Location within Shetland
- OS grid reference: HU354514
- Civil parish: Sandsting
- Council area: Shetland
- Lieutenancy area: Shetland
- Country: Scotland
- Sovereign state: United Kingdom
- Post town: SHETLAND
- Postcode district: ZE2
- Dialling code: 01595
- Police: Scotland
- Fire: Scottish
- Ambulance: Scottish
- UK Parliament: Orkney and Shetland
- Scottish Parliament: Shetland

Westerfield is a coastal community on Mainland, in Shetland, Scotland. The community is within the parish of Sandsting.

It lies to the west of Tresta on the main A971 road.
