= Challister =

Coordinates: 60.369°N 0.977°W

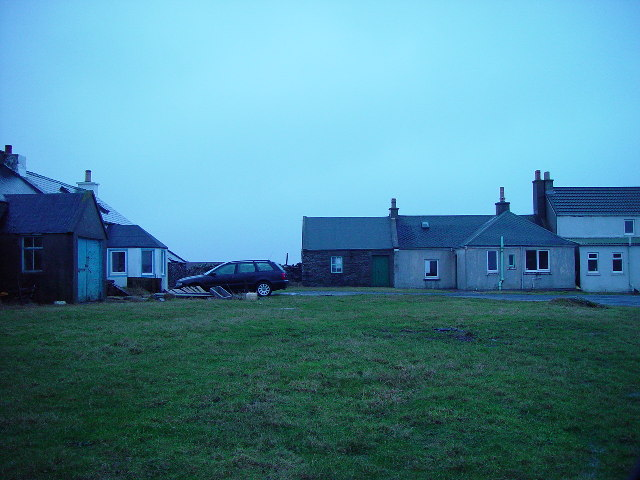
- The square at Challister

- Location within Shetland
- OS grid reference: HU563654
- Civil parish: Nesting
- Council area: Shetland
- Lieutenancy area: Shetland
- Country: Scotland
- Sovereign state: United Kingdom
- Post town: SHETLAND
- Postcode district: ZE2
- Dialling code: 01806
- Police: Scotland
- Fire: Scottish
- Ambulance: Scottish
- UK Parliament: Orkney and Shetland
- Scottish Parliament: Shetland

Challister is a crofting township and ward in northwestern Whalsay in the parish of Nesting in the Shetland islands of Scotland. Loch Vats-houll is in the vicinity. To the north is Challister Ness.
