= Burra Voe =

Scottish bay

Coordinates: 60°29′51″N 1°2′25″W

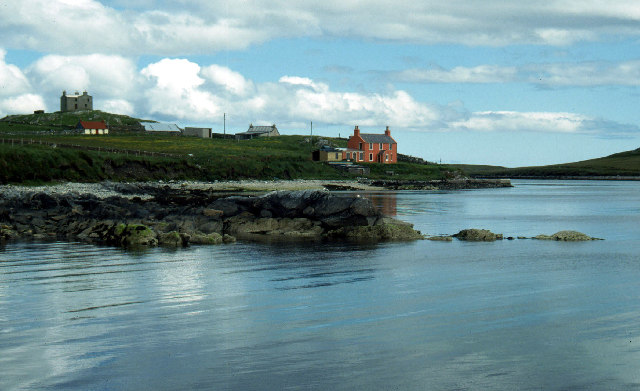

Burra Voe (Old Norse: Borgavagr, Broch Bay) is sheltered bay (voe) at the southeast corner of the island of Yell.

The village of Burravoe (HU525795) is on the north coast of Burra Voe.

== Sources ==
- This article is based on http://shetlopedia.com/Burra_Voe GFDL wiki.
