= Brough Lodge =

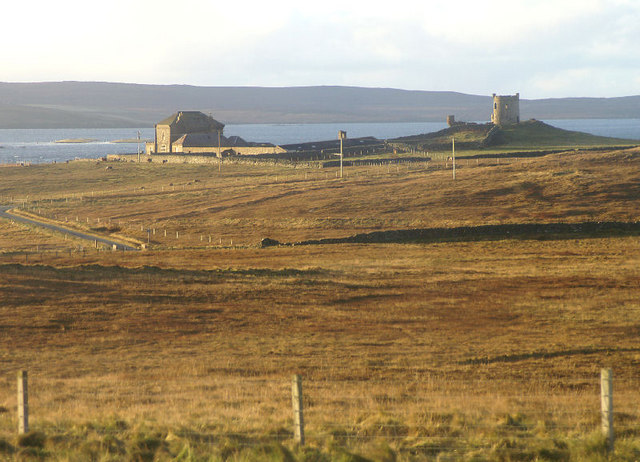
- Brough Lodge, left, and Tower

- Location in the Shetland Islands
- 60.6125°N 0.9421°W

Listed Building – Category A
- Designated: 30 March 1998
- Reference no.: LB45269

Inventory of Gardens and Designed Landscapes in Scotland
- Official name: Brough Lodge
- Designated: 31 March 2003
- Reference no.: GDL00074

Brough Lodge is a 19th-century Gothic mansion on Fetlar, one of the Shetland Islands, in northern Scotland. Built by the Nicolson family, who were responsible for clearing Fetlar of many of its inhabitants, it has been disused since the 1980s. The Brough Lodge Trust has recently started work to restore the building. The house is protected as a category A listed building, and the grounds are included in the Inventory of Gardens and Designed Landscapes in Scotland, the national listing of significant gardens.

== History ==
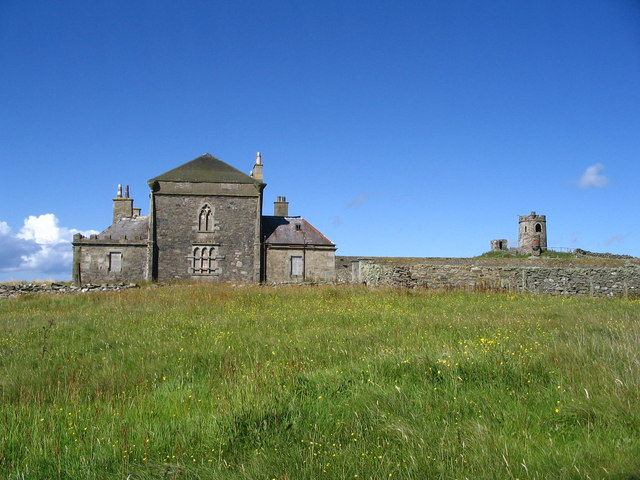
Brough Lodge, with the Tower on the right

In 1805, parts of the island of Fetlar were acquired by the Nicolson family, a well-established Shetland family who also owned Papa Stour among other lands. The land was given to the Nicolsons by Andrew Bruce of Urie, in payment of a debt. Arthur Nicolson (1794–1863) evicted many of the island's tenants on his estate, enclosing the land for sheep farming. He lived at Urie in the north of the island, until Brough Lodge was completed around 1820. In 1826 he was recognised as a baronet, the heir of Sir James Nicolson, 7th Baronet, who had died in 1743.

Brough Lodge was built in the Gothic Revival style, with crenellated walls and bartizans at the corners. Details in Classical and Moorish styles were added to the facades and screen walls, as well as a brick-built chapel. Around 1840, Sir Arthur Nicolson constructed a folly, known as The Tower, on a small hill to the north-east of the lodge. The Tower is built over the remains of an Iron Age broch, and was later used as an observatory. A second folly, the Round House, was built at Gruting in the eastern part of the island, and was later used as an estate office. The lodge and its outbuildings are described as "Shetland's most unusual group of 19th century buildings."

After Sir Arthur died in 1863, the Fetlar estate was left to his widow, Eliza Jane Nicolson (d.1891), who lived in England. On her death it was inherited by Sir Arthur Nicolson, 10th Baronet (1842–1917). The son of the 9th Baronet, Sir Arthur was born in Australia, but spent time living on Fetlar. From the 1890s, finding Brough Lodge in poor condition due to neglect, he undertook renovations. His wife Lady Annie kept a detailed diary of life at Brough Lodge during these years. The lodge continued to be occupied occasionally by the Nicolsons until the death of Lady Jean, widow of Sir Stanley Nicolson, 12th Baronet, in 1987, since when it has been empty. A large number of artefacts and documents were removed from the house, and are now held in the Fetlar Museum.

In 1997, a local initiative to restore the building was begun, and the Brough Lodge Trust was established. Lady Jean's heir transferred ownership of Brough Lodge to the trust in 2007, which plans to use the building as a multi-purpose commercial venue. Proposals to make the building weatherproof, costed at £380,000, were supported by Shetland Islands Council, and fundraising efforts included a concert by Scots musicians Aly Bain and Phil Cunningham. In August 2011, it was announced that Historic Scotland would fund the rest of the project, and that work was about to commence.

In May 2023, Brough Lodge was put up for sale for £30,000, though the potential buyer would have to also pay an estimated £12 million to fully renovate the building. The Brough Lodge Trust's plans include the creation of 24 bedrooms as well as a restaurant.
