= Brindister, West Mainland =

Coordinates: 60.302°N 1.493°W

Brindister
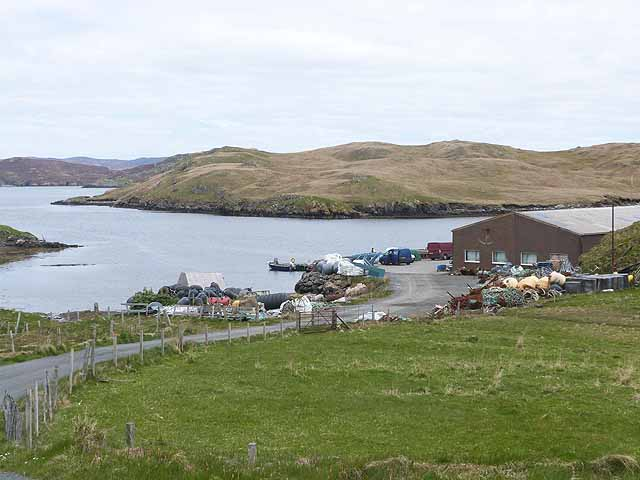
- The pier at Brindister

- Location within Shetland
- OS grid reference: HU280575
- Civil parish: Sandsting
- Council area: Shetland
- Lieutenancy area: Shetland
- Country: Scotland
- Sovereign state: United Kingdom
- Post town: SHETLAND
- Postcode district: ZE2
- Dialling code: 01595
- Police: Scotland
- Fire: Scottish
- Ambulance: Scottish
- UK Parliament: Orkney and Shetland
- Scottish Parliament: Shetland

Brindister is a settlement on the West Mainland of Shetland, Scotland. It is within the parish of Sandsting, and on the western shore of Brindister Voe. The remains of the Broch of Brindister Voe are to the south-east of the settlement.

Brindister provides the only road access to the sea on either side of the sinuous voe, which contains a long-line common mussel fishery.
