= Vats-houll =

Coordinates: 60.372°N 0.969°W

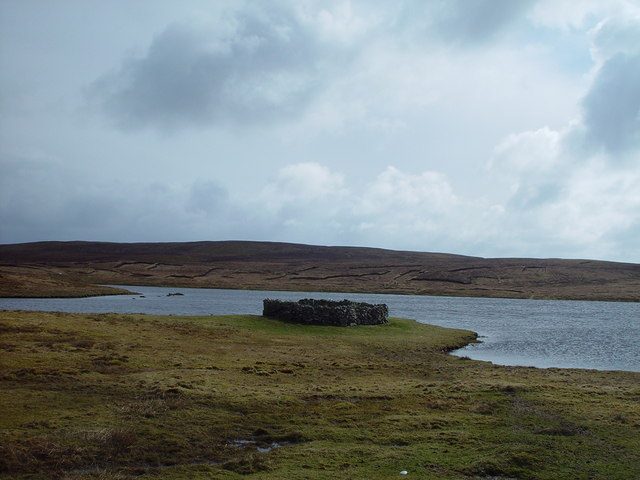
- Loch Vats-Houll

- Location within Shetland
- OS grid reference: HU568657
- Civil parish: Nesting
- Council area: Shetland
- Lieutenancy area: Shetland
- Country: Scotland
- Sovereign state: United Kingdom
- Post town: SHETLAND
- Postcode district: ZE2
- Dialling code: 01806
- Police: Scotland
- Fire: Scottish
- Ambulance: Scottish
- UK Parliament: Orkney and Shetland
- Scottish Parliament: Shetland

Vats-houll is a settlement in northwestern Whalsay in the parish of Nesting in the Shetland islands of Scotland. The village overlooks the loch of the same name on the northwestern bank. An unroofed structure at Vats-houll on the bank of the loch was shown on the 1st edition of the OS 6-inch map of Orkney & Shetland in 1882.
