= Sodom, Shetland =

Coordinates: 60.342°N 1.013°W

Sodom: Sudheim
- Location within Shetland
- Population: 100
- OS grid reference: HU547623
- Civil parish: Nesting
- Council area: Shetland
- Lieutenancy area: Shetland
- Country: Scotland
- Sovereign state: United Kingdom
- Post town: SHETLAND
- Postcode district: ZE2
- Dialling code: 01806
- Police: Scotland
- Fire: Scottish
- Ambulance: Scottish
- UK Parliament: Orkney and Shetland
- Scottish Parliament: Shetland

Sodom (known locally as Sudheim) is a settlement on Whalsay, Shetland. The name is a corruption of the Old Norse Suðheim meaning "south home". It was formerly the home of Hugh MacDiarmid, who was greatly amused at the anglicised form of the name.
