= Braewick, Sandsting =

Coordinates: 60.304°N 1.392°W

Braewick
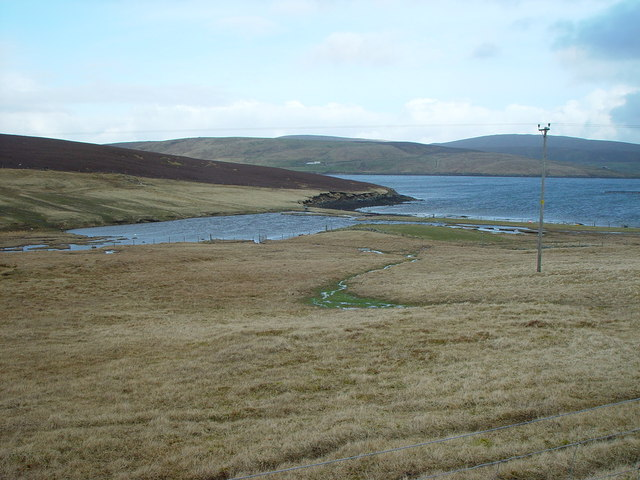
- The Bight of Braewick, adjacent to the settlement

- Location within Shetland
- OS grid reference: HU335578
- Civil parish: Sandsting
- Council area: Shetland
- Lieutenancy area: Shetland
- Country: Scotland
- Sovereign state: United Kingdom
- Post town: SHETLAND
- Postcode district: ZE2
- Dialling code: 01595
- Police: Scotland
- Fire: Scottish
- Ambulance: Scottish
- UK Parliament: Orkney and Shetland
- Scottish Parliament: Shetland

Braewick is a settlement on the west Mainland of Shetland, Scotland. Braewick is on the western shore of Aith Voe and 1.2 mi (2 km) north of Aith itself.
