= Clivocast =

Village in the Shetland Islands, Scotland

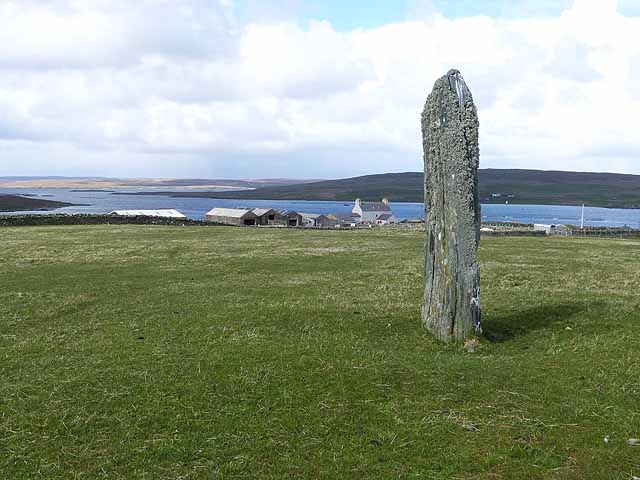
- The Uyea Breck Standing Stone at Clivocast, with Clivocast Farm and Uyea Sound in the background

- Location within Shetland
- Population: 100
- OS grid reference: HP599009
- Civil parish: Unst
- Council area: Shetland
- Lieutenancy area: Shetland
- Country: Scotland
- Sovereign state: United Kingdom
- Post town: SHETLAND
- Postcode district: ZE2
- Dialling code: 01957
- Police: Scotland
- Fire: Scottish
- Ambulance: Scottish
- UK Parliament: Orkney and Shetland
- Scottish Parliament: Shetland

Clivocast is a settlement on the island of Unst in the Shetland Islands, Scotland at 60.67°N 00.90°W or grid reference HP6000 and is situated just east of Uyeasound.

The 9 ft 10 in (3 m) Uyea Breck Standing Stone nearby is said to mark the spot where the son of the Viking Harald Harfager was killed some time around 900AD. He is said to have been buried in the tumulus to the southwest.
