= Browland =

Coordinates: 60.238°N 1.516°W

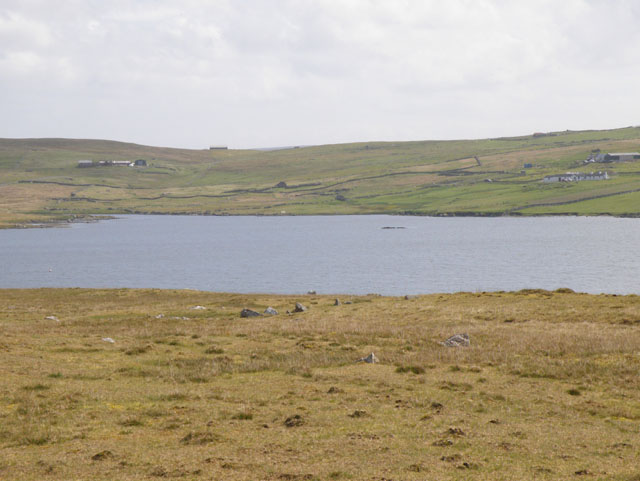
- Looking across the Voe of Browland to part of Browland, itself

- Location within Shetland
- OS grid reference: HU267504
- Civil parish: Sandsting
- Council area: Shetland
- Lieutenancy area: Shetland
- Country: Scotland
- Sovereign state: United Kingdom
- Post town: SHETLAND
- Postcode district: ZE2
- Dialling code: 01595
- Police: Scotland
- Fire: Scottish
- Ambulance: Scottish
- UK Parliament: Orkney and Shetland
- Scottish Parliament: Shetland

Browland is a village on Mainland in Shetland, Scotland situated about 1.9 miles (3 km) east north east of Walls. Browland is within the parish of Sandsting.
