= Copister =

Coordinates: 60.493°N 1.126°W

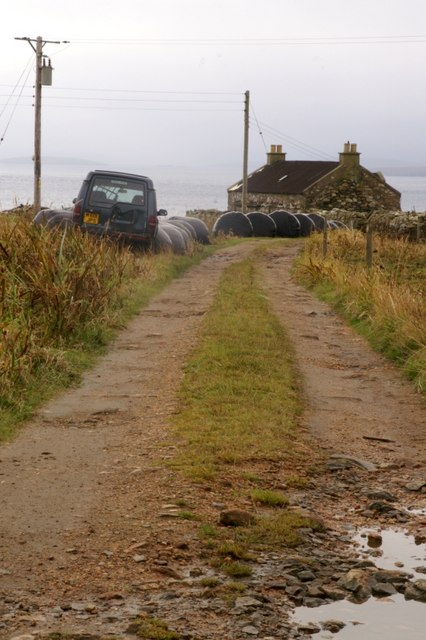
- Croft, silage and old Land Rover at Copister

- Location within Shetland
- OS grid reference: HU480790
- Civil parish: Yell
- Council area: Shetland
- Lieutenancy area: Shetland
- Country: Scotland
- Sovereign state: United Kingdom
- Post town: SHETLAND
- Postcode district: ZE2
- Dialling code: 01957
- Police: Scotland
- Fire: Scottish
- Ambulance: Scottish
- UK Parliament: Orkney and Shetland
- Scottish Parliament: Shetland

Copister is a village in Yell. It is a former centre for haaf net fishing, and has a shingle beach.
