= Mail, Shetland =

Coordinates: 60.035°N 1.228°W

Mail
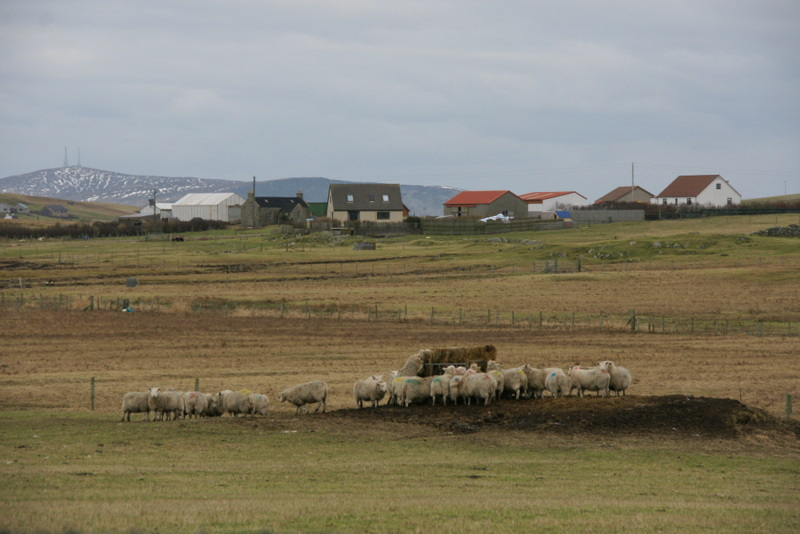
- Sheep and buildings at Mail, looking north, with the Ward of Bressay in the distance

- Location within Shetland
- OS grid reference: HU430279
- Civil parish: Dunrossness
- Council area: Shetland
- Lieutenancy area: Shetland
- Country: Scotland
- Sovereign state: United Kingdom
- Post town: SHETLAND
- Postcode district: ZE2
- Dialling code: 01950
- Police: Scotland
- Fire: Scottish
- Ambulance: Scottish
- UK Parliament: Orkney and Shetland
- Scottish Parliament: Shetland

Mail is a hamlet on the island of Mainland, in the Shetland Islands, Scotland.

== Geography ==
Mail is located on the south-eastern side of the island of Mainland adjacent to the A970 road some 10 miles (16 km) south of Lerwick, between Cunningsburgh and Sandwick. It lies almost on the 60th parallel north. Mail has two beaches, the Sands of Mail and the Beach of Mail, separated by the promontory of Bur Ness. Bur Ness contains the Mail churchyard, which has been the site of various archaeological finds.

== History ==
Bur Ness was the site of Mail's chapel. The chapel was part of Cunningsburgh parish, now part of Dunrossness. Nothing is known of the chapel except that it was the recognised church of the area from a very early date. However, the churchyard still remains.

=== Archaeology ===
Several Pictish gravestones dating from the 7th century have been found in the churchyard, including the Mail Stone, with an incised Pictish figure, found in 1992. Gravestones have also been found with Norse runes, indicating Viking activity in the area, as well as inscriptions in Ogham.

Evidence of earlier Iron Age archaeology is also present. Located on a tidal islet at Bur Ness is the site of the former Broch of Mail. The broch is now non-existent. However, a visit in 1934 indicated the circular foundation of a broch tower, although there are no visible traces, having been covered by turf.
