= West Sandwick =

Coordinates: 60.581°N 1.178°W

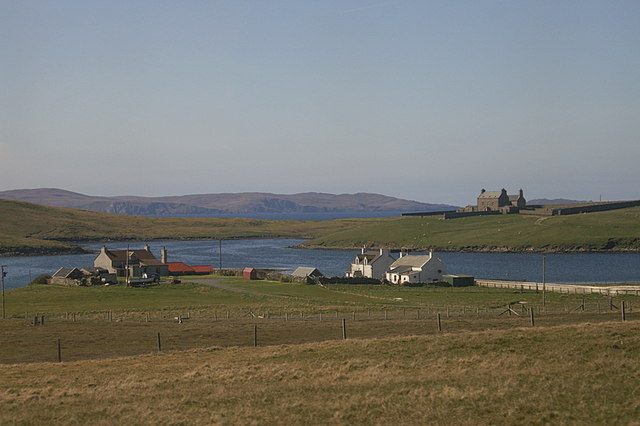
- West Sandwick, Yell, with North Mainland in the background

- Location within Shetland
- OS grid reference: HU450887
- Civil parish: Yell
- Council area: Shetland
- Lieutenancy area: Shetland
- Country: Scotland
- Sovereign state: United Kingdom
- Post town: SHETLAND
- Postcode district: ZE2
- Dialling code: 01957
- Police: Scotland
- Fire: Scottish
- Ambulance: Scottish
- UK Parliament: Orkney and Shetland
- Scottish Parliament: Shetland

West Sandwick (Shaetlan pronunciation: [wast ˈsæᶦnwik] WAST SAN-week) is a settlement on the island of Yell, Shetland Islands, Scotland. It is one of the few settlements in the west of the island.

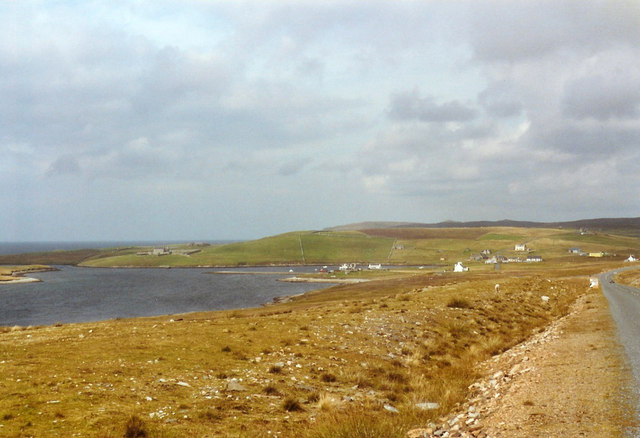
Looking north towards West Sandwick with the North Haa on the distant left

West Sandwick contains one of the major recreational beaches in Yell.

The area south of Southladie Flo is an important feeding area for locally breeding red-throated divers. The rare curved sedge (Carex maritima) grows beside an exit stream on West Sandwick beach.

The bay contains a distinctive shingle spit known as the Urabug.
