= Clousta =

Hamlet on Mainaland in Shetland, Scotland

Coordinates: 60.299°N 1.436°W

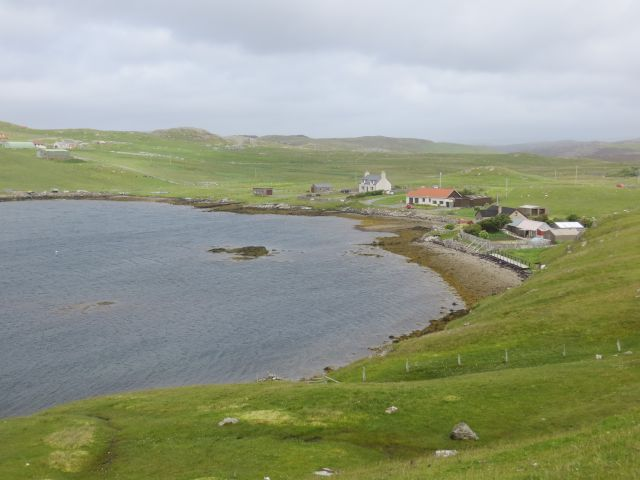
- Clousta beach at the head of the Voe of Clousta

- Location within Shetland
- OS grid reference: HU311572
- Civil parish: Sandsting
- Council area: Shetland
- Lieutenancy area: Shetland
- Country: Scotland
- Sovereign state: United Kingdom
- Post town: SHETLAND
- Postcode district: ZE2
- Dialling code: 01595
- Police: Scotland
- Fire: Scottish
- Ambulance: Scottish
- UK Parliament: Orkney and Shetland
- Scottish Parliament: Shetland

Clousta (Shaetlan pronunciation: [ˈklustə] KLOOS-tə) is a hamlet in the Westside, Mainland, Shetland, Scotland. Approximately seventy people live here, many of whom are commuters, but local industries include mussel farming, and crofting. Clousta is in the parish of Sandsting.
