= Cullivoe =

Coordinates: 60.705°N 1.007°W

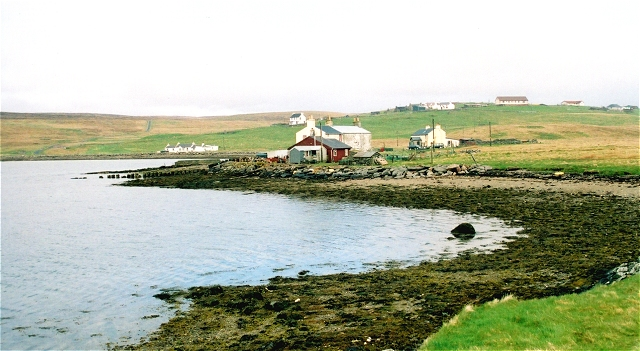
- A small community on the shores of Culli Voe

- Location within Shetland
- OS grid reference: HP543024
- Civil parish: Yell
- Council area: Shetland
- Lieutenancy area: Shetland
- Country: Scotland
- Sovereign state: United Kingdom
- Post town: SHETLAND
- Postcode district: ZE2
- Dialling code: 01957
- Police: Scotland
- Fire: Scottish
- Ambulance: Scottish
- UK Parliament: Orkney and Shetland
- Scottish Parliament: Shetland

Cullivoe (Old Norse: Kollavágr - Bay of Kolli), is a village on Yell in the Shetland Islands. It is in the north east of the island, near Bluemull Sound, not far from Unst.

Cullivoe is a fishing port, and was formerly the ferry terminal for Unst, before ro-ro ferries - the terminal is now at Gutcher. However the harbour, built in 1991, remains the most active on the island and one of the largest UK fishing ports by UK vessels. Strawberries are also grown, at Cullivoe, in polythene tunnels.

The ruined church of St Olaf and cemetery give the place an historical air. The Sands of Breckon composed of crushed shells are near here.

Cullivoe holds an annual Up Helly Aa, on the last Friday in February. Cullivoe also has its own dance band, once fronted by the late Willie Hunter, as well as the Cullivoe Fiddlers, highlighting traditional Shetland music.
