= Voe, Delting =

Coordinates: 60.351°N 1.264°W

Voe
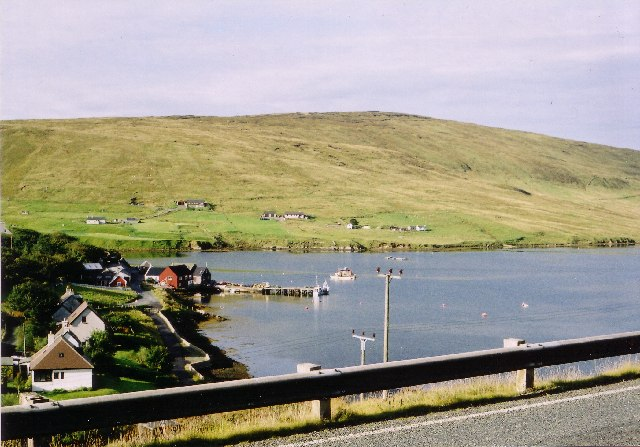
- Voe seen from the war memorial on the A970

- Location within Shetland
- OS grid reference: HU406631
- Civil parish: Delting
- Council area: Shetland
- Lieutenancy area: Shetland
- Country: Scotland
- Sovereign state: United Kingdom
- Post town: SHETLAND
- Postcode district: ZE2
- Dialling code: 01806
- Police: Scotland
- Fire: Scottish
- Ambulance: Scottish
- UK Parliament: Orkney and Shetland
- Scottish Parliament: Shetland

Voe (Shaetlan pronunciation: [vo] VOH) is a village in Delting parish on Mainland, Shetland, Scotland. It is one of the three main settlements in Delting. It is at the junction of the A968 and A970 roads.

The Sail Loft in Voe, a Grade B listed building, was once a store for sail fishing boats' gear, later a knitwear workshop, and then a camping böd run by the Shetland Amenities Trust. The böd closed in 2019. In 2026 it was sold to a community group with support from the Scottish Land Fund.

The Second Edition Six inch Ordnance Survey Map of Voe illustrates how the village has developed in the last century.
