= Burravoe =

Coordinates: 60.499°N 1.054°W

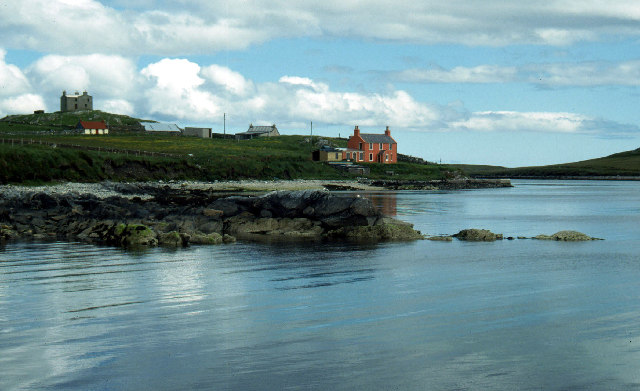
- The harbour of Burravoe

- Location within Shetland
- OS grid reference: HU520798
- Civil parish: Yell
- Council area: Shetland
- Lieutenancy area: Shetland
- Country: Scotland
- Sovereign state: United Kingdom
- Post town: SHETLAND
- Postcode district: ZE2
- Dialling code: 01957
- Police: Scotland
- Fire: Scottish
- Ambulance: Scottish
- UK Parliament: Orkney and Shetland
- Scottish Parliament: Shetland

Burravoe is a community on the north shore of Burra Voe, in the south-east part of the island of Yell in the Shetland Islands, Scotland.

The name Burravoe is derived from the Old Norse Borgavágr, meaning, broch bay.

The most notable building is the Old Haa Museum which dates from 1637 (and may have been completed in 1672) and is the oldest house on Yell. On 19 January 1942, a Catalina aeroplane crashed on the hill above Burravoe. Seven of her ten crew were killed, and one of the propellers can be seen outside the Old Haa Museum.

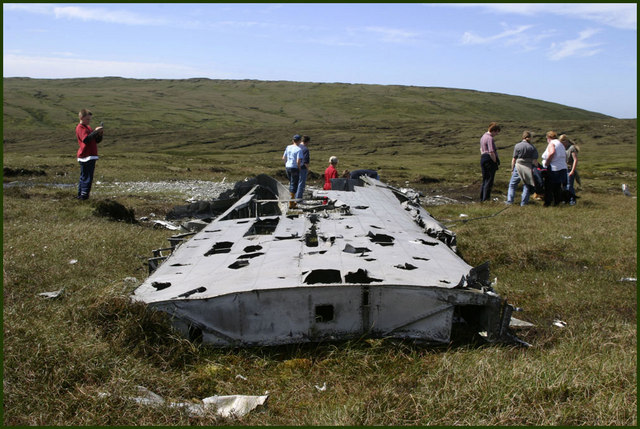
Wreckage from the Catalina crash
