= Lunning =

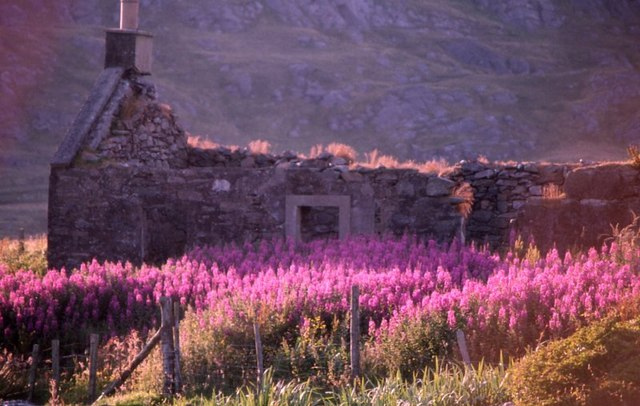

- Location within Shetland
- Area: 0.18 km^{2} (0.069 sq mi)
- Council area: Shetland Islands
- Country: Scotland
- Sovereign state: United Kingdom
- Police: Scotland
- Fire: Scottish
- Ambulance: Scottish

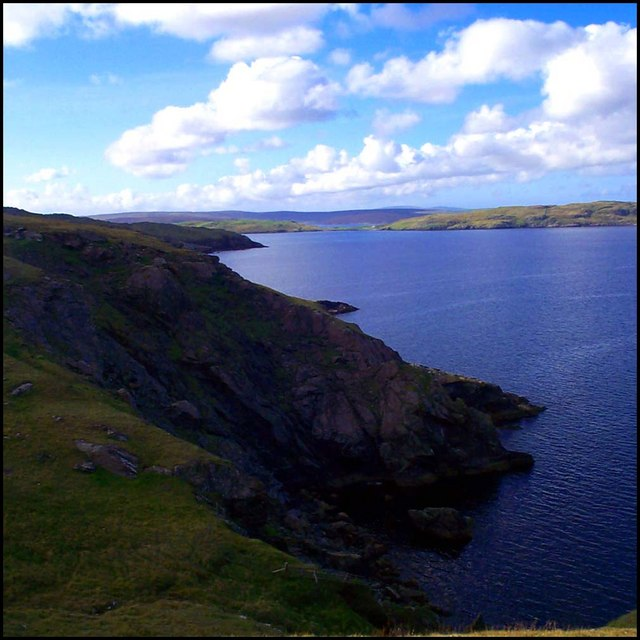
Cliffs near Lunning

Lunning is a coastal hamlet in Mainland, Shetland Islands, Scotland, United Kingdom; the nearest settlement is Vidlin, and it is within the parish of Nesting. There is a standing stone near the settlement.
