= Brindister, South Mainland =

Coordinates: 60.114°N 1.214°W

Brindister
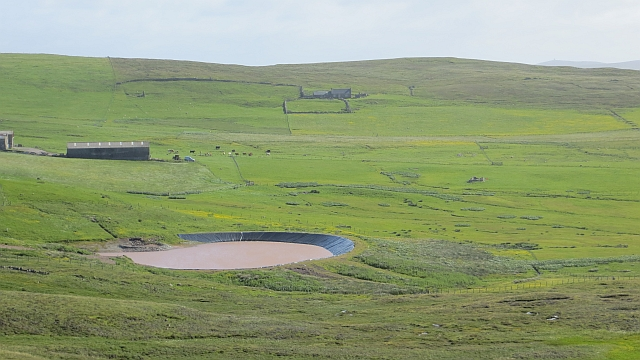
- A reservoir which allows particles to precipitate out of water draining the Brindister Quarry

- Location within Shetland
- OS grid reference: HU436368
- Civil parish: Lerwick
- Council area: Shetland
- Lieutenancy area: Shetland
- Country: Scotland
- Sovereign state: United Kingdom
- Post town: SHETLAND
- Postcode district: ZE2
- Dialling code: 01595
- Police: Scotland
- Fire: Scottish
- Ambulance: Scottish
- UK Parliament: Orkney and Shetland
- Scottish Parliament: Shetland

Brindister is a village on South Mainland in Shetland, Scotland. Brindister is within the parish of Lerwick, and adjacent to the A970 south of Gulberwick.
