= Hamars Ness =

Headland on Fetlar, Shetland Islands, Scotland

Coordinates: 60°37′50″N 0°56′10″W

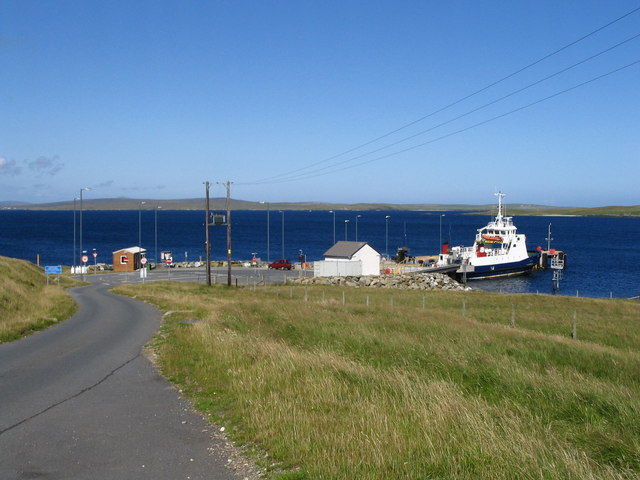
Hamars Ness ferry terminal

Hamars Ness is a headland on the island of Fetlar in Shetland, Scotland. The name is from the Old Norse Hamarsnes meaning "craggy headland". A ro-ro ferry is operated from here, which links Fetlar to the Shetland Mainland, and to the island of Unst. Hamars Ness is to the north of Fetlar's main village of Houbie.
