= Whiteness, Shetland =

Coordinates: 60.182°N 1.304°W

Whiteness
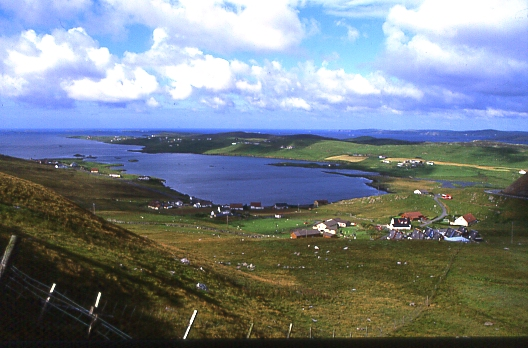
- Whiteness Voe

- Location within Shetland
- OS grid reference: HU386443
- Civil parish: Tingwall
- Council area: Shetland
- Lieutenancy area: Shetland
- Country: Scotland
- Sovereign state: United Kingdom
- Post town: SHETLAND
- Postcode district: ZE2
- Dialling code: 01595
- Police: Scotland
- Fire: Scottish
- Ambulance: Scottish
- UK Parliament: Orkney and Shetland
- Scottish Parliament: Shetland

Whiteness (Shaetlan pronunciation: [ˈhwaɪtnəs] WHYTE-nəs; Old Norse: Hvitanes, white headland) is a village in Tingwall parish, Shetland Islands, Scotland, on Mainland. It is also an ancient civil parish that was merged with Tingwall in 1891.

The village lies seven miles north north west of Lerwick. The parish is now merged with Tingwall. The village has a Methodist church located in South Whiteness and Whiteness Primary School faces Whitedale F.C.'s Football Pitch, Strom. The Whiteness hall is directly next to the primary school.
