= Hascosay =

Island of the Shetland Islands, Scotland

Hascosay (Scots)

Location
- Hascosay shown within Shetland
- OS grid reference: HU556930
- Coordinates: 60.61667°N 00.98333°W

Name
- Old Norse name: Hafskotsey

Physical geography
- Island group: Shetland
- Area: 275 hectares (1.06 sq mi)
- Area rank: 90=
- Highest elevation: 30 metres (98 ft)

Administration
- Council area: Shetland Islands
- Country: Scotland
- Sovereign state: United Kingdom

Demographics
- Population: 0

Hascosay (Shaetlan pronunciation: [ˈhaskəsi] HASS-kə-see; Old Norse "Hafskotsey") is a small island lying between Yell and Fetlar in the Shetland Islands, Scotland.

== Geography and geology ==
The island's rock is coarse micaceous gneiss. It has several pools, but the fresh water in them is frequently contaminated by salt spray. Its area is just over one square mile (2.5 square kilometres).

== History ==
The population of the island was 42 in 1841, but had shrunk to thirteen within a decade. In 1871, the population numbered 4, and in 1881, the island was uninhabited. The laird, Arthur Nicolson, who had bought it had "cleared" parts of Fetlar, and it is possible that the islanders removed themselves in anticipation of a possible future forcible eviction by this landowner.

== Wildlife ==
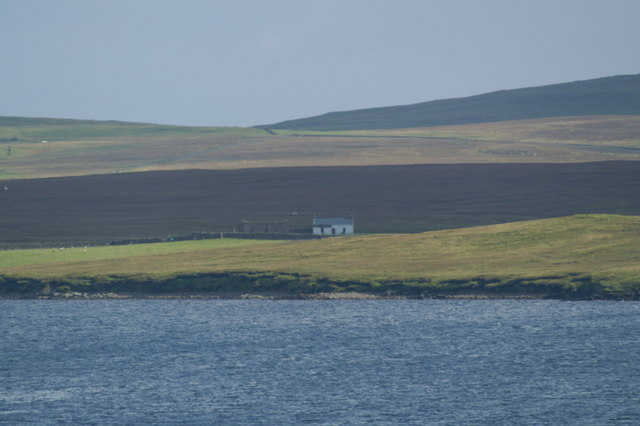
House on Hascosay, with the hills of Fetlar beyond

The island is designated as a Special Area of Conservation on account of its largely undisturbed blanket bog habitat. It is also home to a population of otters.
