= Belmont, Shetland =

Coordinates: 60.684°N 0.964°W

Belmont: Scots: Belmunt
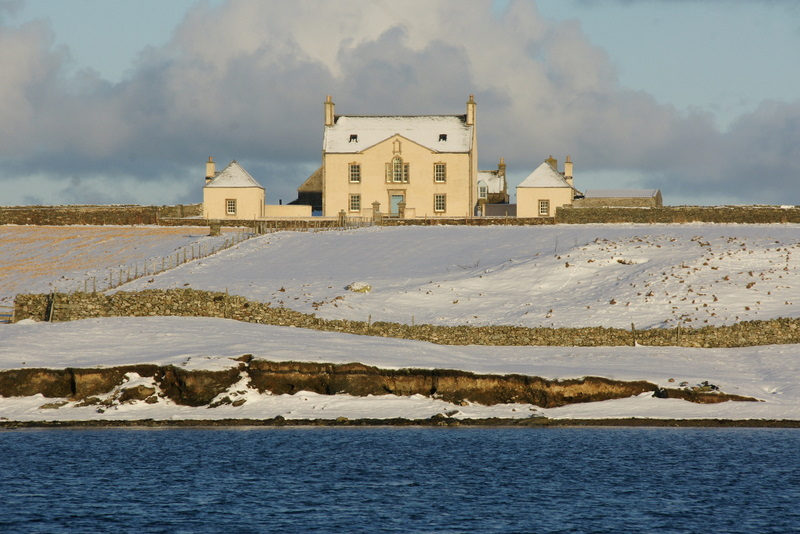
- Belmont House

- Location within Shetland
- OS grid reference: HP565004
- Civil parish: Unst
- Council area: Shetland
- Lieutenancy area: Shetland
- Country: Scotland
- Sovereign state: United Kingdom
- Post town: SHETLAND
- Postcode district: ZE2
- Dialling code: 01806
- Police: Scotland
- Fire: Scottish
- Ambulance: Scottish
- UK Parliament: Orkney and Shetland
- Scottish Parliament: Shetland

Map of Belmont and the south-west corner of Unst, Shetland
List of archaeological sites around Belmont:
1 Hoga Ness broch, SM2072
2 Norse house and field system, SM7656
3 chambered cairn SSW of Gallow Hill. SM7667
4 Snarravoe, township and field system. SM7665
5 Snabrough broch, burnt mound and settlements. SM2083
6 Snabrough rectangular longhouse. SM7650
7 Loomi Shun prehistoric homestead. SM7681
8 Bordastubble standing stones and cairn, near Lund. SM2039
9 Lund Viking/Norse longhouse. SM7663
10 ruins of St Olaf's Church. SM2097
11 Underhoull broch and Norse farmsteads. SM2087

Belmont is a settlement and ferry terminal in southern Unst in the Shetland Islands. The ferry crosses Bluemull Sound from here to Gutcher in Yell and to Hamars Ness in Fetlar.

Belmont House, a Georgian mansion built in 1775 by Thomas Mouat, was restored by Historic Scotland amongst others, and opened to the public in 2011.

== Archaeological sites ==
There are over 90 scheduled monuments on Unst. Eleven of these are in this south-western corner of the island near Belmont, and are shown on the map.

Hoga Ness broch is an iron-age broch (defensive hollow-walled structure), standing on the sea cliffs to the west of Belmont. Dated to the iron age period, 500BC to 200AD, it has two chambers visible within a large grass-covered mound. An entrance passage is on the south side, and there is evidence of outer defensive earthworks. It was first scheduled in 1934 and is one of 130 brochs on Shetland.

A Norse house and field system was excavated just east of Belmont in 1995 as part of the 'Viking Unst project'. The building dates from the early Norse-Medieval period, and was a long rectangular structure, with slightly bowed sides. It was 21 metres (69 ft) long and over 4 metres (13 ft) wide, set in a farm context with other structures and field walls.

On the southwest shoulder of Gallows Hill is a prehistoric chambered burial cairn. Much of the cairn has been scattered, but inner and outer curbstones, an entrance passage and a square burial chamber lined with single large blocks are all clearly visible.

Snarravoe was a small township of at least 5 crofts, amidst strip fields. A track leads down to where 'nousts' (boat shelters) survive above the beach. The crofts were progressively abandoned in the first half of the 20th century, the last being inhabited until around 1950. Since then the whole township has remained undisturbed, such that it is one of the best preserved examples of a now-lost way of crofting life on Shetland.

Snabrough is a tiny loch to the north of Belmont. Along its shoreline are a collection of archaeological features spanning at least 3,000 years. Mounds of burnt stone are the cooking places of a probably Bronze Age settlement. These stand close to an Iron Age broch which is preserved as a large mound, and was originally scheduled in 1934. The footings of croft buildings from the 13th or 14th century can also be seen, in the yard of a now roofless late 18th century croft farmhouse with outbuildings. Several 'nousts' (boat shelters) of some antiquity remain on the loch-shore showing how fishing even on this small body of water was an important component of the crofting economy.

A little to the north of the broch is the Snarborough longhouse, a 21 metres (69 ft) by 4 metres (13 ft) building with characteristic outward bowing walls, with opposed entrances roughly half way along both of the long sides. It is from the Viking or Norse-Medieval times, but seems likely to be towards the earlier end of that timespan.

Loomi Shun prehistoric homestead stands on the slope above Loch of Stourhoull. It is a hollow oval 6.2 metres (20 ft) by 4.7 metres (15 ft), within walls standing 0.4 metres (1.3 ft) high and up to 2.2 metres (7.2 ft) wide.

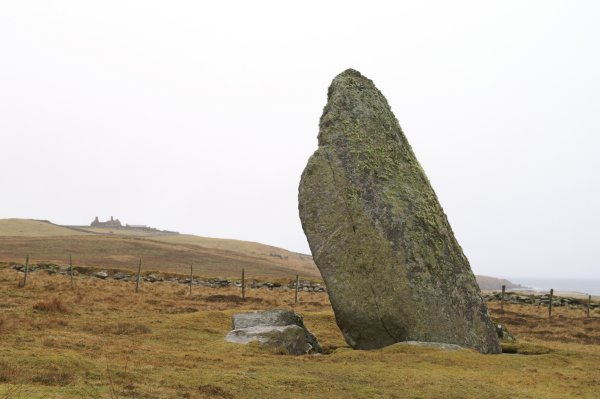
Standing Stone I at Bordastubble, Lund

The Bordastubble Standing Stones are two prehistric stones to the south of a farmstead called Lund. The more northerly stone is particularly massive, being 3.8 metres (12 ft) tall, with a maximum girth of 7 metres (23 ft), with a lean to the southwest. Stone II is substantially smaller and is thought rather to be a remnant of the cairn that still forms a mound of around 20 metres (66 ft) across. They were first scheduled in 1953.

The Lund longhouse is the remains of a rectangular house along with other building outlines, dating from Viking or Norse times, north of the 'Old House of Lund' (an extant farmstead). The oldest struncture had an internal dimension of 20 metres (66 ft) by 4 metres (13 ft), with characteristic 'bowed out' walls along their long sides. Subsequent re-use and adaptation of the buildings through to the medieval period are also evident, with buildings or other structures running at right angles from the longhouse.

St Olaf's Church is a small ruined 12th century church, surrounded by a graveyard still in active use. The building blends characteristics of both Norse and Irish traditions, and incorporates what may be a pictish serpent carving. This, along with what may be 9th century chross slabs, suggests these ruins replaced an earlier Christian building. It fell out of use in 1785 and was shown as a ruin on 19th century maps.

Underhoull broch is an iron age defensive broch in a prominent position overlooking the Lundy Wick inlet. Despite its collapsed and turf-covered state, it still rises some 2 metres (6.6 ft) above ground level, with surrounding rock-cut ditch. Nearby are the remains of both iron huts and fields, overlaid by two Norse longhouses, with outbuildings and field systems. The brock was first scheduled in 1934.

== Geology and landscape ==
The underlying geology of the southern end of Unst is shown in this cross-section, which runs from Hogga Ness, through Belmont and Gallow Hill, to Mu Ness in the east.

Unst is an island half of which is very old 'continental' sandstone rocks, and the other half is oceanic crustal rocks, known as Ophiolites, a rock type rarely found on dry land even though it makes up the vast majority of ocean floor bedrock. Some 420 million years ago, when two continents were converging on a now vanished ocean called the Iapetus Ocean, a slice of dense ocean floor rocks were 'shoved' (thrust) over the top of lighter, more buoyant, sedimentary rock. Normally the endless slow-moving tectonic spreading of the ocean floor ends with the heavy oceanic rocks sinking (being subducted) below the continental plates and end up back in the depths of the Earth's mantle. In this case a slice of rock about the length of Unst and nearby Fetlar, roughly 30 kilometres (19 miles), and perhaps 8 kilometres (5.0 miles) thick, ended up lying on its side, on top of the already ancient continental rocks, and have remained there, subject to massive tectonic forces and millions of years of erosion, ever since.

All of the rocks on Unst, both the oceanic and continental ones, were profoundly affected by this thrust and emplacement of the ophiolite rocks, so are all considerably metamorphosed (changed) compared to how they started out. The ophiolites are multiple layers of different rock types, extending from the top of the oceanic crust (Gabbro), through the deeper crustal layers (Pyroxenite, Wehrlite and Dunite), down below the 'Moho' discontinuity, to the Harzburgite of the mantle itself. However they are all metamorphic forms of these rocks, fractured, compressed and re-crystalised as the slab of rock was driven westward. They were also tilted by the same tectonic forces and perhaps by the weight of the oceanic rocks, such that the different layers are now arranged in near-vertical layers, with the deepest metaharzburgites at Belmont, near the boundary with the continental rocks. The central areas of Unst show the rocks from above the 'moho', and there are metagabbros on the east of the island. An extra complication is that there were two waves of these oceanic rock thrusts. Each slice is called a Nappe, evoking the idea of a ruckled tablecloth. The second Nappe was driven over the top of the first, crushing and slicing the tops of the earlier layers. This 'middle imbricate layer' is a mix of the broken and fractured rocks of both Nappes along with some of the underlying continental rocks (notably Muness Phyllite) dragged over the lower Nappe by the upper Nappe's westward thrust. Erosion has removed much of this second Nappe and also the middle imbricate layer at the southern end of the island, except for stubs that survive at the west and eastern ends of the slab.

The continental rocks were also metamorphosed by the arrival of the oceanic rocks. As the first Nappe arrived it shunted a great mass of the underlying rocks ahead of it. This is the 'lower imbricate zone', which can be found all along the boundary between the two types. This boundary zone can be clearly traced by the three lakes, Loch of Belmont, Loch of Snarravoe and Loch of Stourhoull, which occupy the valley along the more easily eroded lower imbricate zone. To the west, the various continental rocks were also subjected to huge compression. They were laid down over millions of years as sandstone along the fringe of the Iapetus Ocean. Under compression they were metamorphosed into the Valla Field schist and gneiss which, along with some limestone areas and granite intrusions, make up the rocks of the whole west side of Unst, and are part of the Dalradian supergroup of rocks that are found across most of Shetland.
