= Yell, Shetland =

Island of the Shetland Islands

Yell
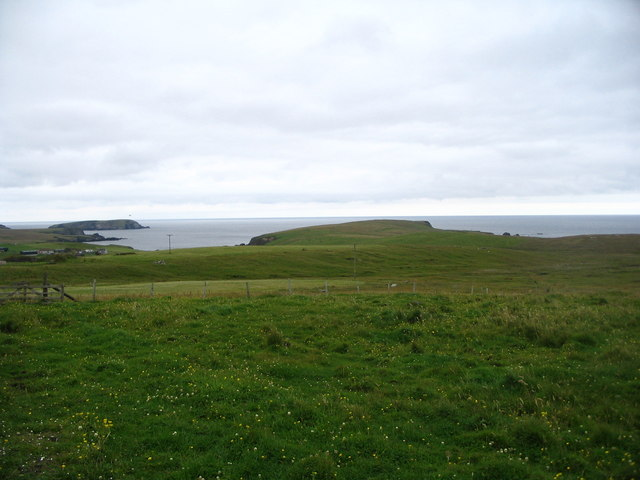

Location
- Yell shown within Shetland
- OS grid reference: HU492935
- Coordinates: 60.62°N 1.1°W

Name
- Name meaning: Possibly of Pictish origin or from Old Norse for 'barren'
- Old Norse name: Jala

Physical geography
- Island group: Shetland
- Area: 21,211 ha (81.9 sq mi)
- Area rank: 11
- Highest elevation: Hill of Arisdale 210 m (689 ft)

Administration
- Council area: Shetland Islands
- Country: Scotland
- Sovereign state: United Kingdom

Demographics
- Population: 904
- Population rank: 16
- Population density: 4.3 people/km^{2}
- Largest settlement: Mid Yell

Yell (Shaetlan pronunciation: [jɛɫ] YELL) is one of the North Isles of Shetland, Scotland. In the 2011 census it had a resident population of 966. It is the second largest island in Shetland after the Mainland with an area of 82 square miles (212 km^{2}), and is the third most populous in the archipelago (fifteenth out of the islands in Scotland), after the Mainland and Whalsay.

The island's bedrock is largely composed of Moine schist with a north–south grain, which was uplifted during the Caledonian mountain building period. Peat covers two-thirds of the island to an average depth of 1.5 metres (4.9 feet).

Yell has been inhabited since the Neolithic times, and a dozen broch sites have been identified from the pre-Norse period. Norse rule lasted from the 9th to 14th centuries until Scottish control was asserted. The modern economy of the island is based on crofting, fishing, transport and tourism. The island claims to be the "Otter Capital of Britain" and has a diverse bird life including breeding populations of great and Arctic skuas. At times, whales and dolphins also appear off the coast.

Notable buildings on the island include the 17th-century Old Haa of Brough in Burravoe, a merchant's house now converted to a museum and visitor centre. There are various folk tales and modern literary references to island life.

== Geography ==
Yell is 19 miles (31 kilometres) in length, with a maximum breadth of 7.5 miles (12.1 kilometres), and is swept all around by very impetuous tides. The island extends northward to within 9.5 miles (15.3 kilometres) of the northwestern extremity of Unst. It is divided by only the narrow Bluemull Sound from the south west of Unst. On the eastern side the coast is generally low and sandy but there is an extensive rocky and partly precipitous coast on the west that rises slowly to elevations of 200–400 ft (61–122 m). It is indented by seven or eight bays forming natural harbours. As Penrith's guide to Orkney and Shetland states:

"The island is roughly rectangular and nearly cut in two where the long voes of Whale Firth and Mid Yell almost meet."

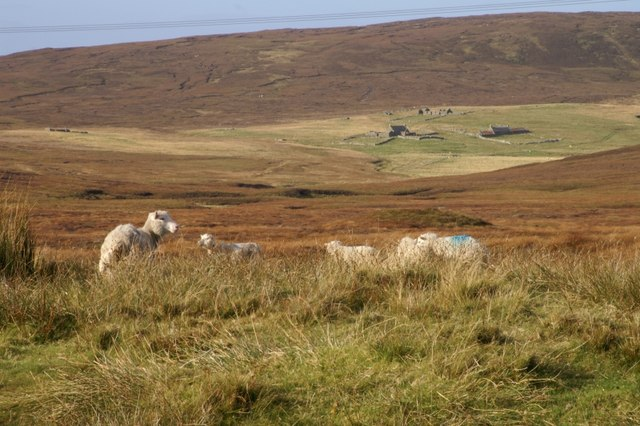
As elsewhere in Shetland, and northern Scotland, depopulation has been a serious problem. This is the former settlement of Bouster, whose name suggests a Norse origin

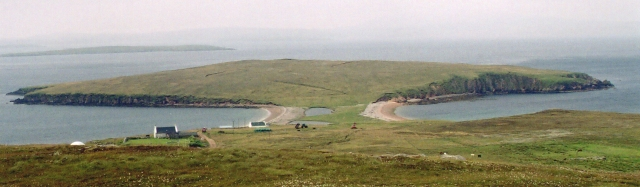
The Ness of Sound, one of many headlands connected by a tombolo

In addition to these large indentations, there are a number of tombolos connecting peninsulas to the island. Many of these are very fragile, and can be damaged extremely easily by human erosion, or severe storms, creating new islands - or resurrecting old ones.

There is comparatively little farmland, but the coast is conducive to fishing. Much of the interior of Yell is covered in a peat blanket, often as much as 10 feet (3.0 metres) thick, which is the result of 3,000 years of deposits. The peat retains a great deal of water, but is easily eroded, particularly when it comes near to the coast. As Jill Slee Blackadder writes:

"Some streams carve deep sided gorges. Among these habitats, you can find a wealth of wild flowers and birds nest here in peace."

The island was anciently divided into the parishes of North Yell, Mid Yell, and South Yell. More recently the parish of North Yell was merged with that of Fetlar, and Mid Yell and South Yell were amalgamated. In 1991, North Yell was merged with Mid and South Yell to the new civil parish of Yell, leaving Fetlar a parish of its own. The island is still divided into the ecclesiastical parish Mid Yell and the quoad sacra parishes North Yell and South Yell.

As with the Shetland archipelago as a whole, the island can be seen as creating a barrier between the northern end of the North Sea (to the east) and the North Atlantic (to the west). To the north east is the Norwegian Sea, and the Arctic Ocean is several hundred km to the north.

Attractions on the island include the Sands of Breckon composed of crushed shells, and the Daal of Lumbister gorge.

=== Settlements ===
Settlements on Yell tend to be coastal and include Burravoe, home to the Old Haa Museum, Mid Yell, Cullivoe and Gloup, as well as Ulsta, Gutcher, Aywick, West Yell, Sellafirth, Copister, Camb, Otterswick, and West Sandwick.

There is little in the way of modern settlements on the west coast other than West Sandwick, mainly because of the prevailing wind and the high cliffs that border much of it. There are a few crofts along Whale Firth, including Windhouse (see notable buildings), and at Grimister there are the ruins of an old herring curing station, which closed after the Second World War.

=== Surrounding islands ===
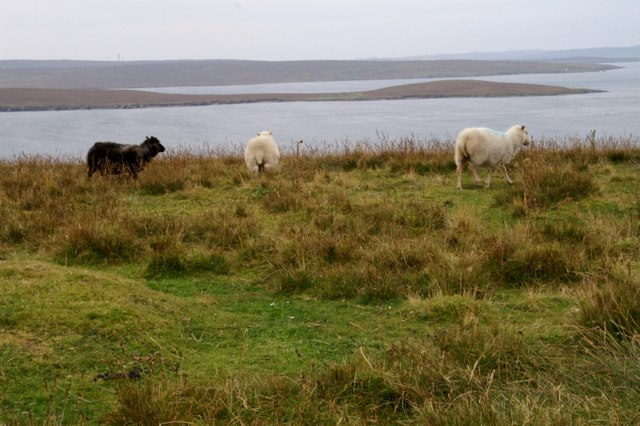
Sheep in south Yell, with Bigga behind

The following islands surround Yell: Aastack, Bigga, Black Skerry, Brother Isle, Brough, Burravoe Chest, Fish Holm, Gloup Holm, Gold Skerry, Green Holm, Grey Stack, Hascosay, Holm of West Sandwick, Kay Holm, Linga, Muckle Holm, Neapback Skerries, Orfasay, Stacks of Stuis, Sweinna Stack, The Clapper, The Quidin, Whalegeo Stacks, Whilkie Stack, and Ern Stack.

== Geology and soils ==
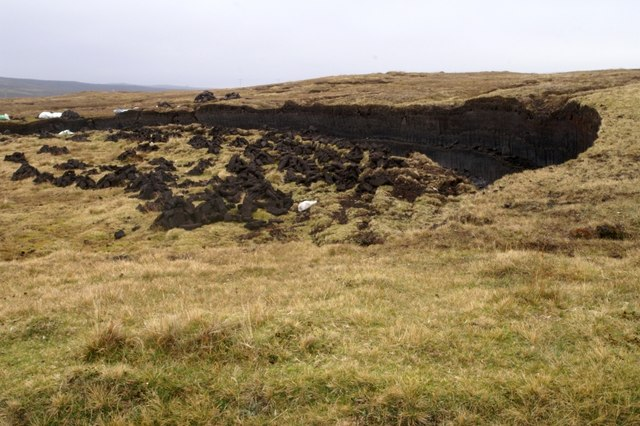
Peat cutting at Ulsta. Deep blanket bog is typical of much of the interior of Yell.

Yell lies to the east of the Walls boundary fault, which is probably a northern extension of the Great Glen fault. There are three main faults that dictate the geography of Yell - the first is the Bluemull Fault, which separates Yell from Unst by creating the Bluemull Sound; the second is the Arisdale Fault which forms the northern part of Whale Firth, and extends south to Arisdale, and out of Hamnavoe; and the third is the Nesting Fault, which more or less creates Yell Sound, and divides Yell from Mainland Shetland. A fourth fault helps create Gloup Voe, and there are some other minor ones. These faults may be seen as radiating branches of the Walls Fault, and were exacerbated by glacial activity.

The island's bedrock is largely composed of Moine schist with a north–south grain, a metamorphosed sedimentary rock originally laid down in shallow water 1,000-800 million years ago and then uplifted and deformed during the Caledonian orogeny 600–400 million years ago. The principal minerals are coarse quartzite, quartz-feldspar gneiss and mica schist.

In common with the rest of Shetland, Yell was covered in thick ice sheets during the Pleistocene ice ages. Some of the island's gorges, such as the Daal of Lumbister, may have originally been created by ancient meltwater streams escaping from underneath retreating glaciers, and it is also thought some of Yell's lochs were originally dammed by moraines.

After the ice melted the island would have experienced a large tsunami some 8,000 years BP associated with the Storegga Slides. The inundation would have reached 25 metres (82 feet) above normal high tides. There is also some evidence at Basta Voe in the north west of a more recent event of a similar nature. In modern times, the non-porous nature of the bedrock, the presence of boulder clay and the cool and damp climate have conspired to create large expanses of peat. This covers two-thirds of the island with an average depth of 1.5 metres (4.9 feet). Its main constituent materials are sphagnum moss, cotton grass, deer grass, heather and sedge. This peat is highly important to the islanders as a fuel source, and in some areas is even worked commercially. It is cut with a tushker (a type of peat spade, akin to the Highland cascrom), and according to Blackadder (2003) "Yell boasts some of the best peat stacking skills in Shetland."

There is also some dune habitat near West Sandwick, something pretty rare in the Shetland Islands; controversially, there has been some commercial extraction of the sand from this area, which may have had a significant environmental impact.

== History ==
=== Origin of name ===
Capital yogh (left)

There are various possible derivations of the island's name. The name Yell, recorded in the 1300s as Iala, may be of Brittonic origin, deriving from *iala, meaning "unfruitful land" (cf. Iâl, Wales; also Yale). Neighbouring Unst may also have a pre-Norse name. The name was also recorded in 1586 as "Yella". In early modern times, it was written as "Zell" (cf "Zetland"), a mistranscription of "Ȝell", from an initial yogh.

=== Early history ===
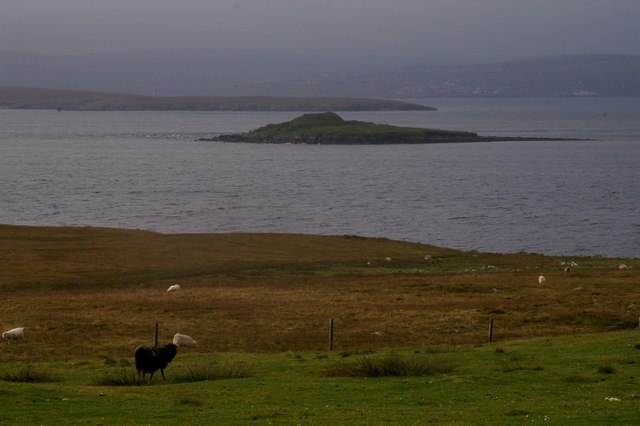
The ruins of the broch on the Holm of Copister can clearly be seen in this view from Copister

Yell has been inhabited since the Neolithic times. A petrosomatoglyph or stone footprint at North Yell, up Hena, 12 by 4 in (30 by 10 cm) is known locally as the 'Wartie' and was used to wash in dew or rain-water; standing in it was supposed to get rid of warts. In legend it was made by a giant placing one foot here and the other on the Westing of Unst.

Twelve broch sites and fifteen early chapels are known. The evidence suggests a substantial population in the Pre-Norse period. One of the brochs is Burra Ness Broch. Only part of the wall remains, on the seaward side. This reaches around 3 metres (10 feet) high in places. There are traces of earthen ramparts on the landward side, and remains of a structure which may have been a guard's cell. There are also remains of an Iron Age blockhouse fort at Burgi Geos. Burravoe's name derives partly from a nearby broch: the element "Burra" frequently being a corruption of the Norse for that.

Yell's placenames reveal the presence of the Celtic Church, whose hermits were known to the Norse as papar. Examples of names related to them include Papil Ness, Loch of Papil and Papil Bay. However, it is unclear whether these names are all pre-Norse, or whether these Christians co-existed with the pagan Norsemen after they invaded. There is evidence of an early Culdee monastery at the Birrier in the west of Yell, near West Sandwick. The Birrier was almost certainly in contact with another monastic settlement directly opposite, across Yell Sound, at the Kame of Isbister on the Northmavine Peninsula of Mainland. A service was held in 2000 at the Birrier to commemorate two millennia of Christianity.

A cross slab from North Yell may also be from this period, but it has been lost. It is presumed to be like the Bressay Stone.

=== Norse era ===
Yell Sound is mentioned in the Orkneyinga saga: "Earl Rögnvald... and the chiefs Sölmond and Jón with him... had a fine body of troops, though not too numerous, and five or six ships. They arrived at Hjaltland [Shetland] about the middle of summer, but heard nothing of Frákork. Strong and contrary winds sprung up, and they brought their ships to Alasund (Yell Sound), and went a-feasting over the country."

In the later Norse period Christianity flourished and foundations of 20 chapels dating from this period have been identified.

The primary Norse legacy is an array of placenames of potentially fully or sometimes partial Old Norse origin. For example, "Dalsetter" is a combination of dalr meaning a "dale" or "valley", either from Old Norse or Old English, possibly influenced by both; and setr meaning a "hill pasture" or shieling, or as a (potentially Norse) interpretation of Old English ("sǣte"). "Gossawater" is a combination of either Old English "gōs" and/or Old Norse "gás" (goose), á (river) and vatn (a lake/loch) anglicised as "water".

Other potentially Norse elements on Yell include "firth" which is from either or possibly both the Old English ""Ford"" and Old Norse "fjörðr" as in Whale Firth, "voe" which is an Old Norse cognate with English 'way' (Old English 'weġ')(Old Norse vagr) as in "Gloup Voe", "sound" (Both Old English and Old Norse use sund) as in "Bluemull Sound" and "-a(y)" (ey) as in nearby Hascosay and Linga.

=== Hanseatic trade and early modern period ===
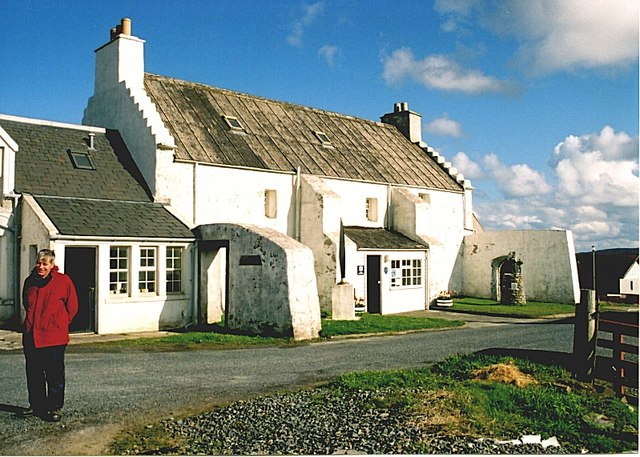
Old Haa Museum, Burravoe

Although most of Shetland's Hanseatic trade was conducted from Scalloway, Burravoe was one of the most important of the other Hanseatic centres in the archipelago.

In the 17th century, the Dutch East Indian ship Lastdrager was wrecked on Yell, and the survivor Jan Camphuis wrote favourably of his experiences on the island. He noted the generosity and kindness of the islanders to him, which he believed was disproportionate to their poverty. Yell is mentioned by Martin Martin in his 1695 A Description of the Western Islands of Scotland where he noted that "there are three churches, and several small chapels in it."

The Rev. Crutwell in the 18th century said of Yell that "the inhabitants have plenty of fuel, catch immense quantities of small fish, and live comfortably."

=== Modern history ===
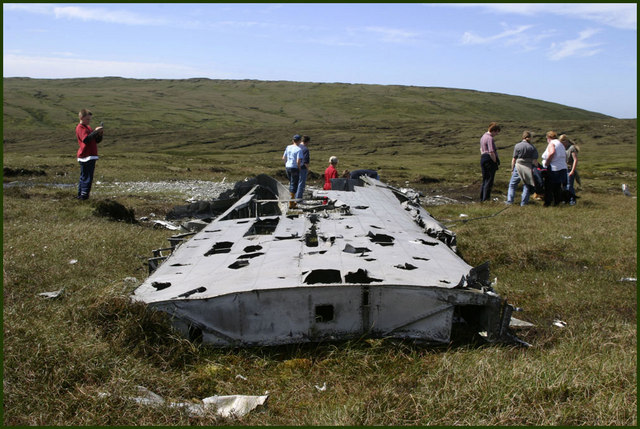
Wreckage from the Catalina crash

Johnnie Notions successfully carried out early smallpox inoculations on Yell in the 18th century, at a time when many other places remained sceptical.

In the 1841 New Statistical Account the minister of Fetlar and North Yell noted that although smuggling had almost entirely disappeared the local population had "fallen into an abominable habit of smoking tobacco". In the same year the minister of Mid and South Yell observed a rise of 50% in the local price of black cattle due to the introduction of a fortnightly steamer service from Lerwick to Leith that had enabled exports of livestock to mainland Scotland. Fishing on Yell received a particularly vicious blow when 53 fishermen were killed in a storm off Gloup in 1881. There is a memorial to them there now.

Germans have claimed that during the First World War their U-boats used to shelter in Whale Firth – this is possible because of the very low population of the area.

During the Second World War the Luftwaffe bombed the post office at Gutcher in an attempt to disrupt the communications system. On 19 January 1942 a Catalina airplane crashed on the hill above Burravoe. Seven of her ten passengers were killed and one of the propellers can be seen outside the Old Haa Museum.

Just after the Second World War the old herring curing station at Grimister closed; this was to be one in a long line of economic difficulties including the loss of fishing.

Between 1953 and 1964 Dr Robert Hope-Simpson, a GP, carried out painstaking research establishing that shingles is the reactivation of previously acquired chickenpox (varicella) virus.

In 1961 a Soviet spy ship sank off Yell; the wreck was found by Lieutenant George Wookey, who had also investigated the wreck that inspired Whisky Galore in the Outer Hebrides. It was an undercover plain clothes mission; Lt. Wookey found the wreck 90 ft (27 m) down in clear water.

During the 1960s Yell reached an impasse. It was in 1965 that the Orcadian novelist Eric Linklater said that Yell was "the problem child of the archipelago" due to its economic woes and burgeoning depopulation. Some blamed this on the islanders' "social egalitarianism", which supposedly prevented anyone from becoming a "leader or entrepreneur"; Haswell-Smith disagrees but believes that "airing the matter seems to have helped" It is certainly notable that the tiny remote Out Skerries seem to be wealthier and that Whalsay is better at retaining its population. Yell is neither near Lerwick like Bressay nor bridged to the mainland like Burra or Muckle Roe. Some Yell people do commute to work at Sullom Voe, but as this appears to be a declining industry this does not hold out hope for the future. Unlike neighbouring Fetlar, Yell never suffered large scale clearances, only some local ones, and has long had multiple ownership. Jim Crumley, himself an incomer, has noted the difficulties faced by Yell by both depopulation and repopulation.

== Flora and fauna ==
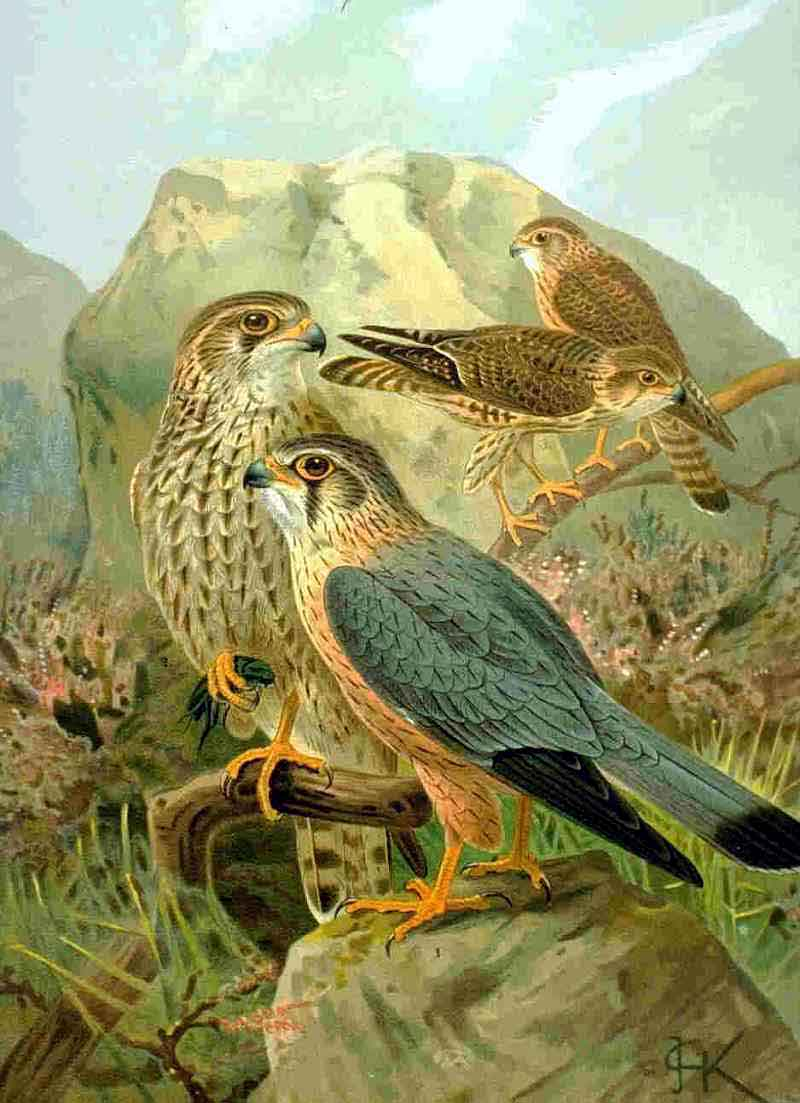
The merlin (Falco columbarius), Britain's smallest bird of prey, breeds on Yell

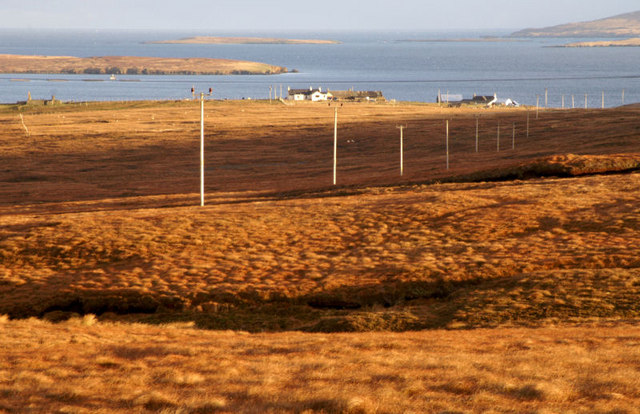
Winter sun shining on red grass near Basta, east Yell

The coastline of Yell includes numerous voes (narrow inlets) where otters and various seabirds are common. Brown trout can be found in the inland waters.

=== Mammals ===
Yell claims to be the "Otter Capital of Britain". The shore is low-lying and the peaty soil is soft, making it ideal for excavation burrows. The long days in summer also make spotting these largely nocturnal creatures in daylight more likely than on the British mainland. Hugh Miles' documentary The Track of the Wild Otter was shot on location at Burra Ness at the mouth of Busta Voe; it gained awards and was produced for the BBC. Grey and common seals are also regular visitors to Yell's coast.

Yell occasionally receives the odd Arctic visitor besides the tern; in 1977, a stray bearded seal was recorded. Normally these creatures only live on the pack ice. Humans have introduced a number of animals including rabbits, and it has even been questioned whether otters could have arrived by themselves, although this is controversial. Porpoises are occasionally seen nearby too.

The island has its own subspecies of field mouse, as do some of the other Shetland Islands, and Hirta in St Kilda.

=== Birds ===
A population of Arctic terns, known locally as tirricks (stress on last syllable; an onomatopoeic word), migrates to Shetland from Antarctica during the summer. As swallows are sometimes seen as harbingers of summer elsewhere, in Yell and Shetland, it is the tirricks or terns that fulfil this role -

"On Yell [the Arctic tern] has the impact of August on a heather moor, and nothing draws the islander closer to nature's year than the first tern."

Other birds that regularly visit Yell include great and Arctic skuas, various terns, eider, Eurasian whimbrel, red-throated diver, dunlin, golden plover, twite, lapwing and merlin. The Eigg, and Ern Stack in the north west of Yell, is the last known nesting site of Shetland sea eagles, which were recorded there in 1910.

=== Flora ===
Yell has many of the usual plants found in northern European moorland, especially heather in abundance, including two carnivorous plants, the butterwort and the sundew. A substantial study of the flora of Yell's dry stone walls was undertaken in 1986–87. Lichens, especially Ramalina species, were the most commonly found plants.

The gorges in the island, such as the Daal of Lumbister provide an important environment for some of the few trees on the island, since they are untouched by sheep grazing. Before human colonisation, it appears that Yell was wooded to some degree, at least with dwarf trees and shrubs. In the gorge at the head of Gloup Voe, dog roses and honeysuckle can be found. As the peat preserves old plants and pollen to some degree, due to its anaerobic nature, it is possible to get some sense of the former vegetation of the island. For example, it is known that 40,000 years ago, before the advent of the last ice age, and probably any human habitation, that oak, Scots pine and Mediterranean heathers were growing here. The remains of these plants have been preserved in layers of ancient peat, which were in turn buried by the boulder clay left by glacial moraines.

== Transportation ==
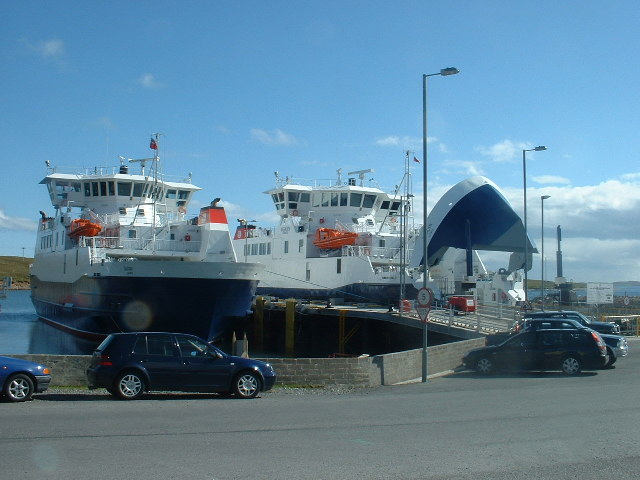
Daggri and Dagalien at Ulsta.

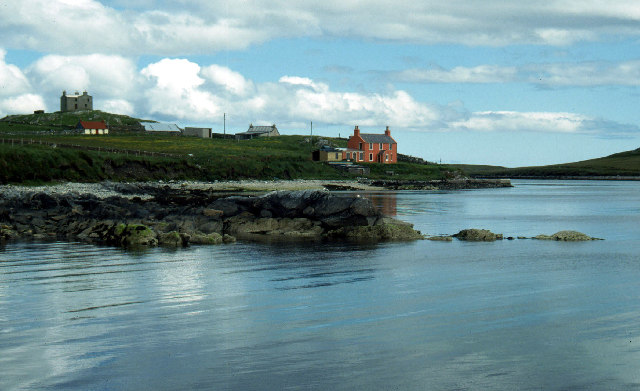
Burravoe

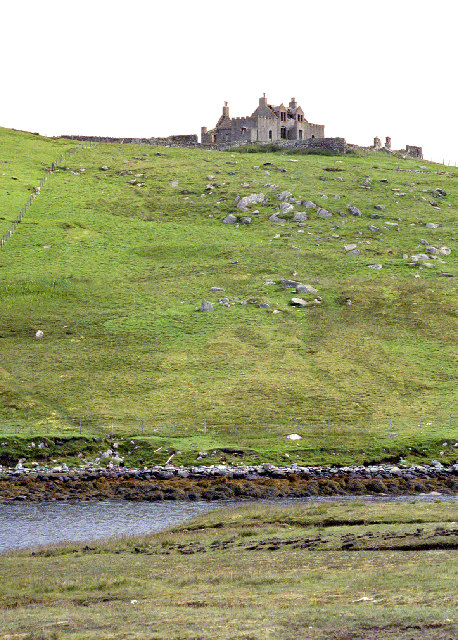
Windhouse, reputedly the most haunted house in Shetland, and also troll country.

Yell is a transport hub for the neighbouring islands of Unst and Fetlar.

The Yell Sound Ferry sails from Ulsta on the island to Toft on the Shetland Mainland. The service is operated by two ferries—Daggri (Norse for "dawn"), launched in 2003 and Dagalien (Norse for "dusk"), launched in 2004. These vessels, built in Gdańsk in Poland, can each carry 31 cars or 4 trucks, as well as 95 passengers. The crossing takes approximately 20 minutes, and ferries leave around every half-hour at peak times. The Bluemull Sound Ferry sails from Gutcher on Yell to Belmont on Unst and Oddsta on Fetlar. The ferries travel to Unst approximately every half-hour during the day, and to Fetlar a few times every day. The journey to Unst takes ten minutes, while travelling to Fetlar takes 25 minutes. The service is operated by Bigga and Geira.

There are two main roads, the A968 and the B9081. The A968 runs from Ulsta in the southwest of the island to Gutcher in the northeast, linking the ferry to and from Mainland, Shetland, with those going to Unst and Fetlar. Despite being a listed A road, it is single track in some stretches with passing places. The B9081 is single track with passing places. It runs along the south coast of Yell, and up its east, and part of the northeast too. The stretch from Mid Yell to Gutcher is replaced by the A968, but it recommences after that.

== Economy ==
Yell's industries include fishing, fish farming, farming (including commercial strawberry production in polytunnels, mainly for the Shetland market), peat cutting, transport and tourism.

Cullivoe had a new deep water harbour built in 1991, but the general decline in fish stocks in the North Sea and North Atlantic has not made it useful to fishing. It may however fulfil a transport role.

In January 2008, the Shetland Development Trust gave a loan worth £11,000 to Global Yell Ltd, in order to develop "creative industries", i.e. textile weaving and music.

The "world's first community-owned tidal power generator" became operational during April 2014 in Bluemull Sound. The turbine is a 30 kW device by Nova Innovation. North Yell Development Council believed that the project could make a significant contribution to the local economy.

== Notable buildings and structures ==
Built in 1707, the now ruined stone building of Windhouse is claimed as the most haunted house in Shetland. In 1880, when Windhouse was renovated, skeletons were found under the floor of the building. After lying empty for over 80 years, it was bought in 2003 by an English couple intending to restore it. As of February 2015, no restoration has taken place and the property is back on the market.

Windhouse Lodge is the solidly built gatehouse to Windhouse and is run by Shetland Amenity Trust as a camping Böd. This is a well-equipped böd providing accommodation for up to eight people in three bedrooms. Facilities include a hot water heater, shower, crockery, basic cooking utensils, fridge, microwave, kettle, compact cooker with grill, oven and 2 hotplates.

The Old Haa of Brough in Burravoe is a substantial merchant's house built in 1672 now converted to a museum and visitor centre.

At Kirkabister, the remains of a former pony stud can be seen. The enclosure is unusual in appearance, having each of its four corners slightly elevated. There are only a handful of such enclosures in the archipelago.

== Folklore ==
At Breckon it is said that when an eroding grave was excavated, a number of human skeletons were uncovered, one of which was not only at least seven-foot tall, but had small stumpy "horns" above the temples. Whether this man was a mutant or this is a tall story is unclear.

Like all good Nordic lands, Yell has its trolls (known in the Northern Isles as "trows" or "trowes"). The Trow of Windhouse was about as recently as the 1880s, when a shipwrecked sailor claimed he had been attacked by the mythical monster. However, the sailor was courageous enough to fight the creature, and saw it off with an axe. It is said that where he killed the trow, the grass turned a light green. This was not the only trow by any means, and there is another story of a Yell woman coming upon a family of trowes, who later woke up to find one in the house, asking who he was, he said "I am Trippa's son". The woman said a prayer, and the trowe disappeared.

== Literature ==
=== George MacKay Brown ===
George Mackay Brown, an Orcadian poet, wrote a poem which has a Yell-man of 1263 as a narrator.

I am a farmer from Yell in Shetland.
Bjorn my mother called me.

Bjorn grows up amongst "seals and clouds and birds and women" on the island, but this idyll is contrasted with his father's disappearance, and profession as a Viking pirate covered in scars and "harvesting" silver.

=== Jim Crumley and Among Islands ===
Jim Crumley is a Dundonian who bought a semi-ruined cottage on Yell. He has written extensively on Yell in the book Among Islands (1994), which contains subject matter ranging from St Kilda and the Hebrides to Shetland. He says his original interest in islands sprung from seeing Inchcape out in the distance, as a teenager. He worked for over twenty years in various newspapers, usually writing about Scottish wildlife and landscapes; his later work has included a number of books on the Scottish islands, and mountains, often including his own photographs.

Crumley has said, "You could never argue with conviction that Yell is a beautiful place", but some others such as Jill Blackadder rate the Sands of Breckon and the cliff scenery of Gloup Voe as some of the best in Shetland. Despite issuing an apparent dismissal, Crumley still has a definite affection for the island, and its almost mechanical role in Shetland as a whole. In fact, the statement turns out to be a kind of a backhanded compliment:

"It looks the way Orkney must have in centuries past before that relentless greening began. The only green on a Yell moor in April is a boggy ooze. Yet Yell is the Shetland I carry with me, the Shetland I pack when I leave, the Shetland I am impatient for when I return. It works because of where it is, an island among islands, a perfectly sealed lynchpin, which makes geographical sense of Shetland, and without which the whole archipelago would slide out of kilter and slither uncontrollably into the sea."

As an incomer himself, he writes on the complications that this has caused the island:

"As elsewhere, the island has suffered from depopulation, and has been challenged by repopulation... good intentions do not turn an incomer into a son of the island soil. That is not to say that there is no place for the incomer [though]."

== See also ==
- List of islands of Scotland

== Sources ==
- Nicolson, James R. (1972) Shetland. Newton Abbott. David & Charles.
- The geography section incorporates text from Wilson, Rev. John (1882) The Gazetteer of Scotland Edinburgh. W. & A.K. Johnstone.
