= Ulsta =

Coordinates: 60.504°N 1.156°W

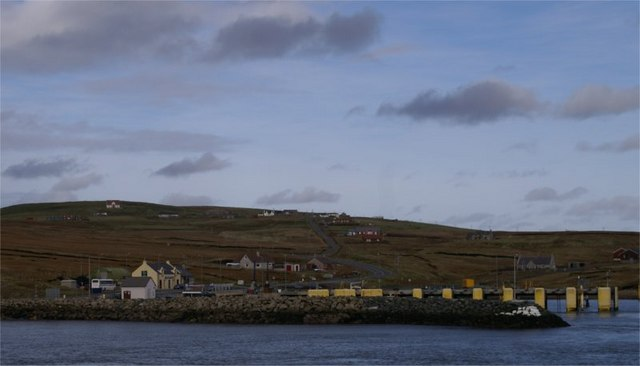
- The Ulsta ferry terminal at the south end of Yell

- Location within Shetland
- OS grid reference: HU464803
- Civil parish: Yell
- Council area: Shetland
- Lieutenancy area: Shetland
- Country: Scotland
- Sovereign state: United Kingdom
- Post town: SHETLAND
- Postcode district: ZE2
- Dialling code: 01957
- Police: Scotland
- Fire: Scottish
- Ambulance: Scottish
- UK Parliament: Orkney and Shetland
- Scottish Parliament: Shetland

Ulsta (Shaetlan pronunciation: [ˈuɫstə] OOL-stə) is a village in the south-west of the island of Yell, Shetland, Scotland. North Ness Hall is the local community facility. The car ferry to Toft on Mainland, Shetland leaves from here.
