= Toft, Shetland =

Coordinates: 60.471°N 1.211°W

Toft
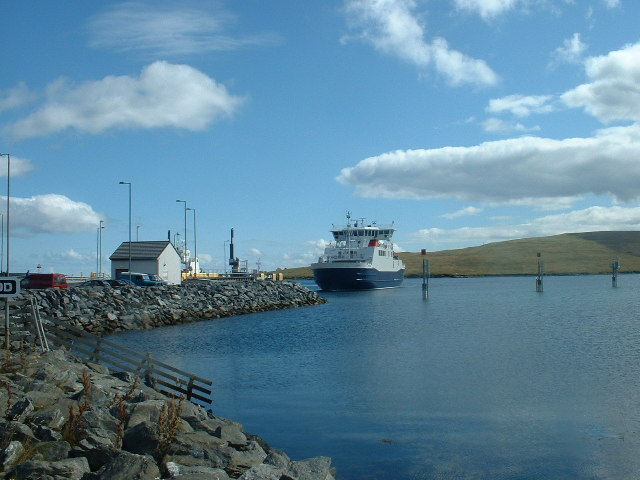
- The ferry MV Dagalien approaching Toft Pier. This is the ferry across Yell Sound to the island of Yell.

- Location within Shetland
- OS grid reference: HU433765
- Civil parish: Delting
- Council area: Shetland
- Lieutenancy area: Shetland
- Country: Scotland
- Sovereign state: United Kingdom
- Post town: SHETLAND
- Postcode district: ZE2
- Dialling code: 01957
- Police: Scotland
- Fire: Scottish
- Ambulance: Scottish
- UK Parliament: Orkney and Shetland
- Scottish Parliament: Shetland

Toft (Shaetlan pronunciation: [taft] TAFT) is a ferry port approximately one mile north of Mossbank on Mainland, Shetland, Scotland. From here, a car ferry service to Ulsta on the island of Yell operates. Toft is located in the parish of Delting.

In the late 1970s and early 1980s there was a large workers' camp here, housing thousands of men who were building the Sullom Voe Terminal.
