= Fetlar =

One of the North Isles of Shetland, Scotland

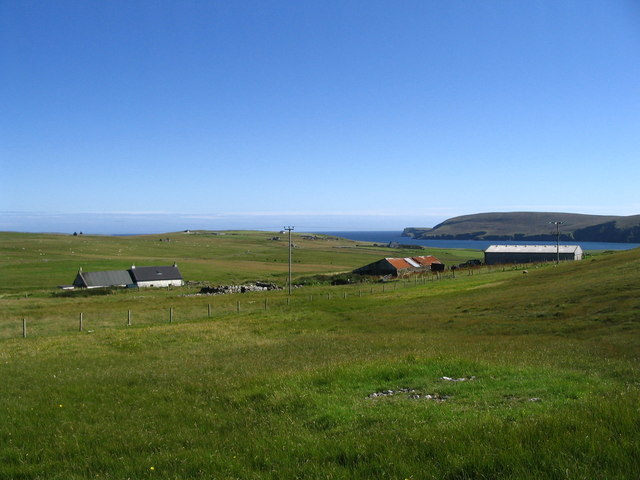

Location
- Fetlar shown within Shetland
- OS grid reference: HU620919
- Coordinates: 60.60°N 0.87°W

Name
- Name meaning: Unclear
- Old Norse name: Fætilar

Physical geography
- Island group: Shetland
- Area: 4,078 ha (15 3/4 sq mi)
- Area rank: 25
- Highest elevation: Vord Hill 158 m (518 ft)

Administration
- Council area: Shetland Islands
- Country: Scotland
- Sovereign state: United Kingdom

Demographics
- Population: 66
- Population rank: 50
- Population density: 1.6/km^{2} (4.1/sq mi)
- Largest settlement: Houbie

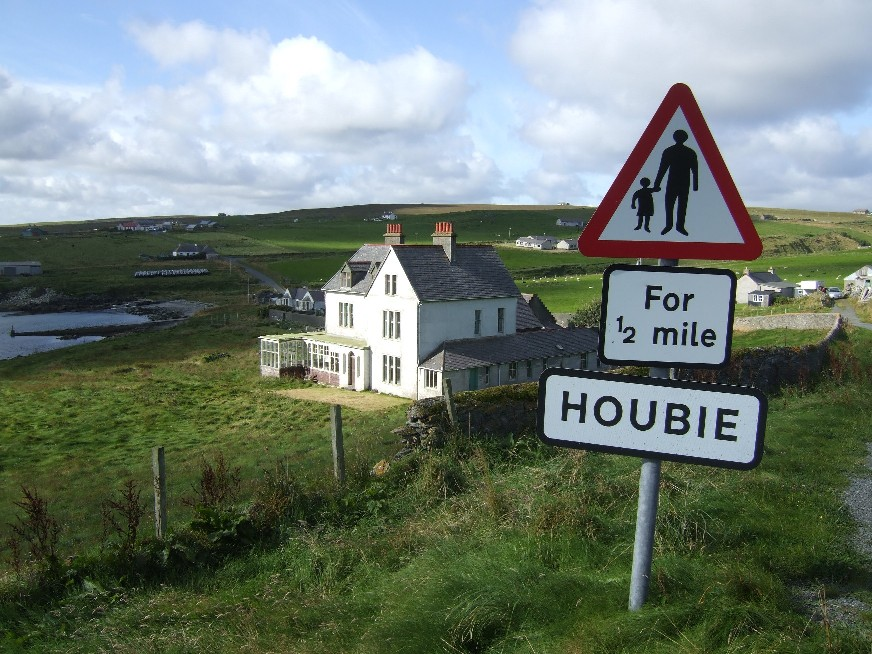
Leagarth House, Houbie

Fetlar is one of the North Isles of Shetland, Scotland, with a usually resident population of 61 at the time of the 2011 census and 66 in 2022. Its main settlement is Houbie on the south coast, home to the Fetlar Interpretive Centre. Other settlements include Aith, Funzie, Herra and Tresta. Fetlar is the fourth-largest island of Shetland with an area of just over 4,000 ha (9,900 acres).

== Etymology ==
There are three island names in Shetland of unknown and possibly pre-Celtic origin: Fetlar, Unst and Yell. The earliest recorded forms of these three names do carry Norse meanings: Fetlar is the plural of fetill and means "shoulder-straps", Omstr is "corn-stack", and í Ála is from ál meaning "deep furrow". However, these descriptions are hardly obvious ones as island names, and are probably adaptations of a pre-Norse language. This may have been Pictish but there is no clear evidence for this. Haswell-Smith suggests a meaning of "prosperous land" and that the island's name may mean "two islands strapped together" by the Funzie Girt. It was recorded as "Fötilør" in 1490, and as "Pheodor Oy" in 1654.

== History ==
One of the strange features of Fetlar is a huge wall that goes across the island known as the Funzie Girt or Finnigirt Dyke. It is thought to date from the Mesolithic period. So sharp was the division between the two halves of the island that the Norse talked of East and West Isle separately.

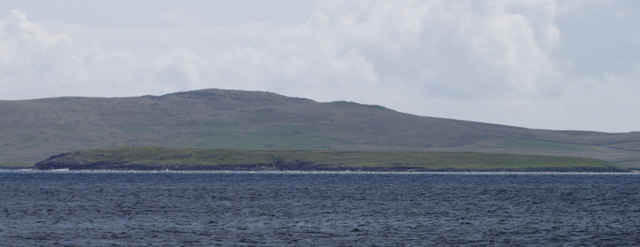
Urie Lingey with Fetlar in the background

Another attraction on the island is the Gothic Brough Lodge, built by Arthur Nicolson in about 1820, and which is undergoing restoration by the Brough Lodge Trust. The Fetlar sheepdog trials take place annually, normally in July. The Fetlar Foy, once very popular with Shetlanders and tourists alike, took place at midsummer on the Links at Tresta where folk were entertained with music, food and drink.

=== Famous son ===
Its most famous son was Sir William Watson Cheyne Bt FRS FRCS, a close associate of Lord Lister and one of the pioneers of antiseptics. He was professor of surgery at King's College London, President of the Royal College of Surgeons of England and wrote many books on medical treatments. He was made a baronet for services to medicine in 1908, and later was an MP—first for the Universities of Edinburgh and St Andrews, and then for the Combined Scottish Universities—between 1917 and 1922. He was lord-lieutenant of the Shetland Islands from 1919 to 1930. Cheyne died on 19 April 1932.

Fetlar was home to the Society of Our Lady of the Isles, an Anglican religious order for women, until it moved to Unst in 2015.

=== Fishing and shipwrecks ===
The island has a long tradition of fishing. According to Guinness World Records, in August 2012 what was then the oldest message in a bottle, released in June 1914, was found by Andrew Leaper, skipper of the Copious, coincidentally the same fishing vessel involved in a previous record recovery in 2006. The bottle, and Mr Leaper's World Record certificate, have been donated to the Fetlar Interpretative Centre. Fetlar also has an international selection of shipwrecks including Danish, Dutch, German, English and Soviet vessels.

== Geography and geology ==
Fetlar has a very complex geology, including gneiss in the west, metamorphosed gabbro and phyllite, and kaolin. There is also antigorite and steatite here. Talc was mined here. The east of the island, along with the east side of Unst, is part of the Shetland ophiolite complex (a section of the Earth's oceanic crust and the underlying upper mantle that has been uplifted and exposed above sea level. See Belmont, Shetland#Geography and geology for more detail).

Fetlar is surrounded by a number of small islands, particularly in the sound between it and Unst. These include to the north: Daaey, Haaf Gruney, Sound Gruney, Urie Lingey and Uyea; and to the west: Hascosay and Linga.

It is separated from Hascosay and Yell by Colgrave Sound. Much further to the south are the Out Skerries and Whalsay.

== Nature and conservation ==
Fetlar's wildlife is as varied as its geology. For example, over two hundred species of wild flower have been identified here. The island is known as "The Garden of Shetland", due to its highly fertile soil.

The northern part of Fetlar is a RSPB reserve, home to several important breeding species including Arctic skuas and Eurasian whimbrels. The Lamb Hoga peninsula and nearby Haaf Gruney have some of the largest colonies of European storm petrel. In total the island supports 20,000 individual seabirds, including nationally important populations of Arctic skua, Northern fulmar, great skua, Arctic tern and red-necked phalarope. Of greatest importance are red-necked phalaropes, for which the Loch of Funzie is the most important breeding site in the United Kingdom, and for a while during the 1990s was the only breeding site in the country. A pair of snowy owls famously bred here in the 1960s and early 1970s. They lasted until the 1980s before disappearing. However, a snowy owl was spotted on Fetlar in October 2018. Most of the island, with some adjacent islets, has been designated an Important Bird Area (IBA) by BirdLife International.

Fetlar, and the seas around it, hold several overlapping conservation designations:

- The North Fetlar Special Area of Conservation (SAC) covers 1,585 ha (3,920 acres) of the island, and protects the islands dry heaths and base-rich fens .
- The North Fetlar Site of Special Scientific Interest (SSSI) covers 1,637 ha (4,050 acres) of the island as well as smaller surrounding islands, and protects the grasslands and heaths of these islands. These are important breeding locations for seals and seabirds.
- The Fetlar Special Protection Area (SPA), covers 16,965 ha (41,920 acres) of the island and surrounding seas due to the importance of this habitat for many species of seabirds.
- The Fetlar to Haroldswick Nature Conservation Marine Protected Area protects 21,600 ha (53,000 acres) of sea. It completely surrounds Fetlar, and extends to cover all sea between the islands and the neighbouring islands of Yell and Unst from the Colgrave Sound to Haroldswick.

== Infrastructure ==
Ferries sail daily from Hamars Ness on Fetlar to Gutcher on Yell, and to Belmont on Unst. A new breakwater and berthing facility was added at Hamars Ness, and was officially opened on 1 December 2012.

There is a communications tower on Fetlar at: 60°36'5.39"N, 0°55'35.44"W. Fetlar is "Under Evaluation" for superfast broadband according to Digital Scotland.

Fetlar has a small airstrip with a gravel runway. There are no longer scheduled air services to the island.

== Community development ==
Fetlar Developments Ltd (FDL), a company limited by guarantee and a registered charity, was set up by the community to counter the depopulation of the island, which had fallen to just 48 in early 2009, when the 2001 total had been 86. The development company continue to work towards securing a sustainable future for the island both socially and economically.

Work to install three wind turbines in a Community wind energy project began in December 2015.

== Demographics ==
In the 2022 census, 63.6% of Fetlar's residents were recorded as born in England, higher than any other area in Shetland. 77.2% of residents were recorded as aged 50 or above.

== School ==
In 2009 there were 3 primary pupils and 1 nursery pupil at Fetlar primary school, situated at Baela near Houbie.

The school was reported as having been mothballed in 2022 after its last student left and no new students were expected to join in the following academic year.

== See also ==
- List of islands of Scotland
