= Gutcher =

Coordinates: 60.671°N 0.998°W

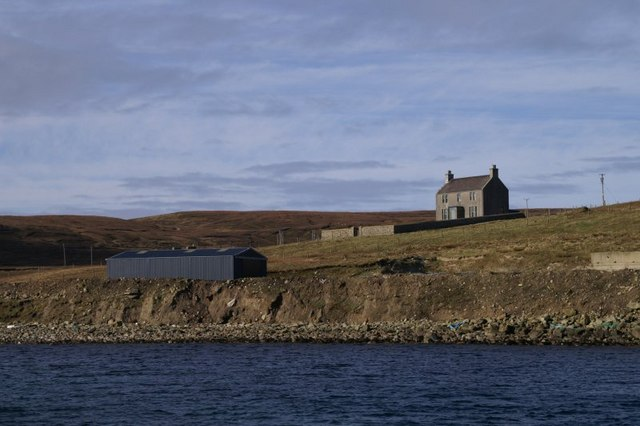
- Ferncliff House, viewed from Bluemull Sound

- Location within Shetland
- OS grid reference: HU548991
- Civil parish: Yell
- Council area: Shetland
- Lieutenancy area: Shetland
- Country: Scotland
- Sovereign state: United Kingdom
- Post town: SHETLAND
- Postcode district: ZE2
- Dialling code: 01957
- Police: Scotland
- Fire: Scottish
- Ambulance: Scottish
- UK Parliament: Orkney and Shetland
- Scottish Parliament: Shetland

Gutcher (Shaetlan pronunciation: [ˈgutʃər] GOOTCH-ər) is a settlement on the northeast coast of Yell in the Shetland islands. From here, rollon/roll off ferry services to Belmont on Unst and Hamars Ness on Fetlar operate. The settlement has a harbour, and a former post office which, in 2012, reopened as a bed and breakfast. There is a café adjacent to the ferry waiting room (Geoffrey's) that opened in 2019.

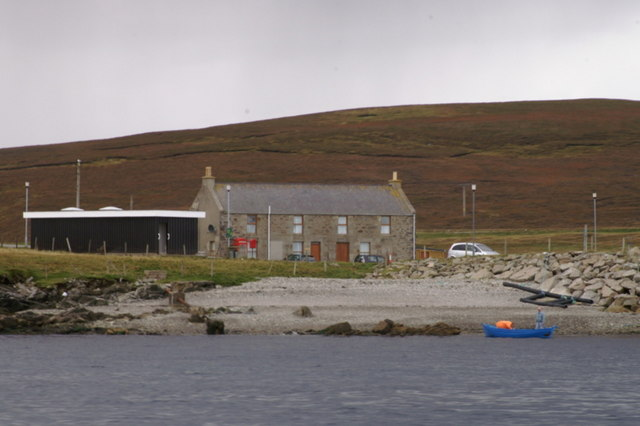
The former post office, once subjected to aerial attack.

During World War II, the Luftwaffe machine gunned the post office at Gutcher in an attempt to disrupt the communications system.
