= ZE postcode area =

Postcode area within the United Kingdom

Lerwick
- Postcode area
- Location within the United Kingdom
- Coordinates: 60.226°N 1.201°W
- Sovereign state: United Kingdom
- Postcode area: ZE
- Postcode area name: Lerwick
- Post towns: 1
- Postcode districts: 3
- Postcode sectors: 4
- Postcodes (live): 650
- Postcodes (total): 749
- Statistics as at May 2020

The ZE postcode area, also known as the Lerwick postcode area, is a group of three postcode districts covering the Shetland Islands in Scotland. The letters in the postcode are derived from Zetland, an archaic spelling of the islands' name that was the name for the council area until 1975.

Mail for the ZE postcode area is processed at Aberdeen Mail Centre.

== Coverage ==
The approximate coverage of the postcode districts:

Postcode district	Post town	Coverage	Local authority area
ZE1	SHETLAND	Lerwick, Scalloway, Trondra	Shetland Islands Council
ZE2	SHETLAND	Most of Mainland, Bressay, Yell, Unst, Fetlar, Foula, Fair Isle	Shetland Islands Council
ZE3	SHETLAND	Virkie	Shetland Islands Council

== Map ==
ZE postcode area map, showing postcode districts in red and the post town in grey text.

The KW postcode area is situated to the southwest.

== See also ==
- Postcode Address File
- List of postcode areas in the United Kingdom
- Extreme points of the United Kingdom
