= Virkie =

Coordinates: 59°53′N 1°18′W

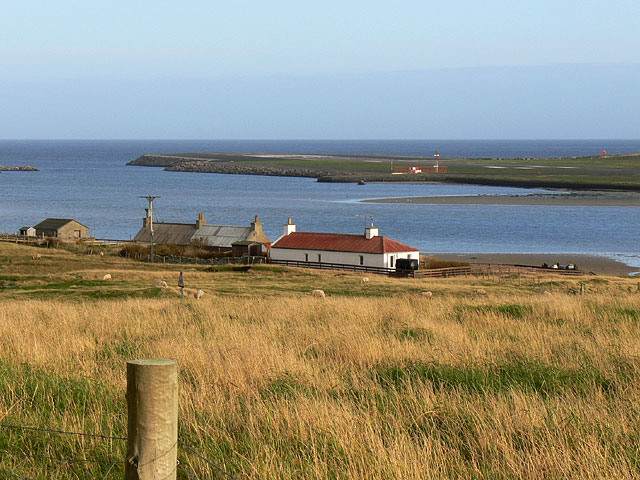
Pool of Virkie

Virkie (Shaetlan pronunciation: ['vɪrki] VIRR-kee) is the most southerly district of Shetland, other than Fair Isle and is best defined as the area south of the Ward Hill in Dunrossness, also locally referred to as "below da hill" (below the hill), or "da laich Ness" (the low headland).

Virkie encompasses the following settlements; Exnaboe, Toab, Scatness, and Sumburgh.

Virkie is the only place which uses a ZE3 postcode.

There is an Iron Age Broch and Village which was discovered in 1975 in old Scatness, part of Virkie.

== Attractions ==
- Jarlshof
- Old Scatness
- Pool of Virkie
- Sumburgh Airport
- Sumburgh Head

== See also ==
- Virkie Marina
- Ness Boating Club

== Sources ==
- This article is based on http://shetlopedia.com/Virkie a GFDL wiki.
