= Ness of Burgi =

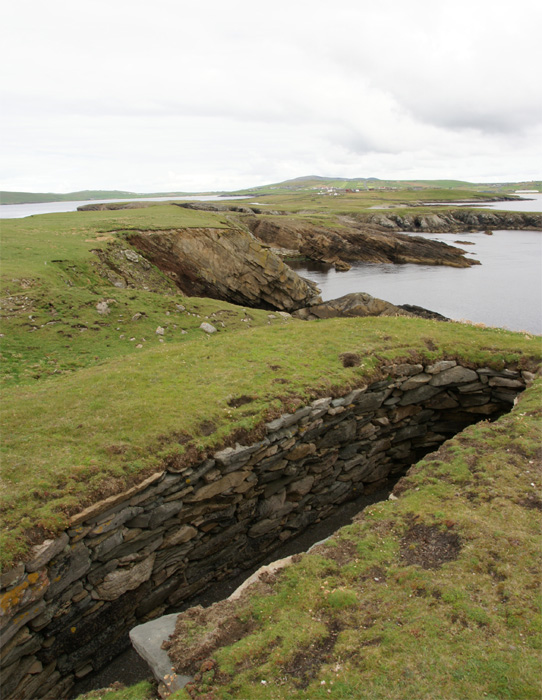
- Northern part of the Ness looking inland towards Scatness. The structure in the foreground is part of the Ness of Burgi fort

Location
- Location within Shetland
- OS grid reference: HU 3877 0855
- Coordinates: 59.859644°N 1.31042°W

Physical geography
- Island group: Shetland

Administration
- Council area: Shetland Islands
- Country: Scotland
- Sovereign state: United Kingdom

The Ness of Burgi is a narrow peninsula that stretches to the south from the Scat Ness headland of Mainland, Shetland, a Scottish island. It is in the parish of Dunrossness.

The Ness is less than 1 kilometre (0.62 mi) long, running in south of southwest direction from Scat Ness.It terminates with the rocks of the Hog of the Ness. Offshore from the point are the Hog of the Holm and Horse Island.

The Ness of Burgi fort, probably built around 100 BC in the Iron Age, lies on the Ness. The fort is isolated by a rampart and had a ditch on either side. A ruined stone wall, now a low bank covered in turf, runs from side to side of the promontory and may be part of the fortification. In 1935 the site was excavated by Miss C L Mowbray. The fort is about 1 mile (1.6 km) south from the village of Scatness, and may be reached by foot along a grass path that leads to the Ness of Burgi. The fort is on a rocky promontory on the east side of the Ness and is open to the public at all times.

== Construction and dating ==
The promontory fort at Ness of Burgi was built during the Iron Age, probably around the 1st century BC. The site occupies a narrow rocky headland overlooking Mousa Sound in southern Shetland Islands, where steep cliffs on three sides provide strong natural defences. By building a massive stone barrier across the narrow neck of the promontory, the builders effectively turned the headland into a fortified enclosure.

=== Construction ===
The fort is centred on a substantial stone blockhouse forming the main defensive barrier across the approach to the headland. The structure measures roughly 23 metres (75 ft) long and about 5 to 6 metres (16 to 20 ft) wide, roughly the length of a tennis court. Today the surviving walls stand to about 1.5 metres (4.9 ft) in height, though they would originally have been considerably taller.

The walls were built from locally quarried stone laid in dry stone masonry, meaning the stones were carefully stacked without mortar. This technique was widely used in Iron Age Atlantic Scotland and allowed builders to construct thick, durable walls using only locally available materials.

A narrow entrance passage runs through the blockhouse. Small chambers flank the passage and may have functioned as guard cells or storage spaces, a layout also seen in the entrance complexes of nearby broch sites.

The defences were reinforced further by ditches cut directly into the bedrock on the landward side of the promontory. These rock cut trenches made the approach more difficult for attackers, while the surrounding cliffs provided natural protection on the other sides.

=== Dating evidence ===
The monument was excavated in 1935 by C. L. Mowbray, who recovered pottery fragments and other artefacts from the site. These finds indicate that the fort was occupied during the later Iron Age, with activity at the site falling between about 200 BC and AD 200.

No material suitable for radiocarbon dating, such as charcoal or bone, has yet been recovered from the site. Instead, archaeologists estimate the fort's age by comparing its pottery and architecture with those found at similar sites. The ceramics resemble pottery from Iron Age settlements associated with the broch building communities of northern Scotland.

The architectural form of the blockhouse also resembles defensive structures at other Shetland sites, suggesting that Ness of Burgi belongs to the same Iron Age settlement landscape as the Broch of Mousa, Old Scatness, and Jarlshof.

=== Construction phases ===
Archaeological evidence suggests the fort underwent more than one phase of construction or repair. Differences in masonry indicate that parts of the defensive wall were modified or rebuilt during the period of occupation.

Because only limited excavation has taken place, the exact sequence of these changes remains uncertain. Some archaeologists suggest the site began as a simpler barrier across the promontory and was later strengthened with the blockhouse entrance.

=== Labour and organisation ===
Constructing the fort required quarrying large quantities of stone, transporting it to the site, and assembling it into thick dry stone walls. Workers also cut defensive ditches directly into the bedrock of the headland.

Although precise labour estimates are unavailable, projects of this scale would have required coordinated communal labour, likely organised by a local farming community controlling the surrounding landscape and coastal waters. The fort's position overlooking Mousa Sound suggests it may also have functioned as a lookout or defended refuge controlling access through the channel.

== Gallery ==
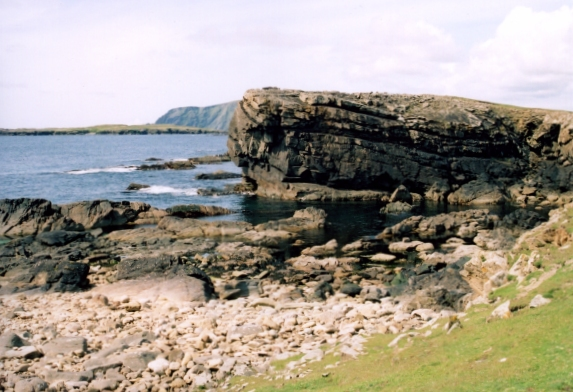
Hog of Breigeo, Ness of Burgi. This geo is typical of the rocky promontory of Ness of Burgi.

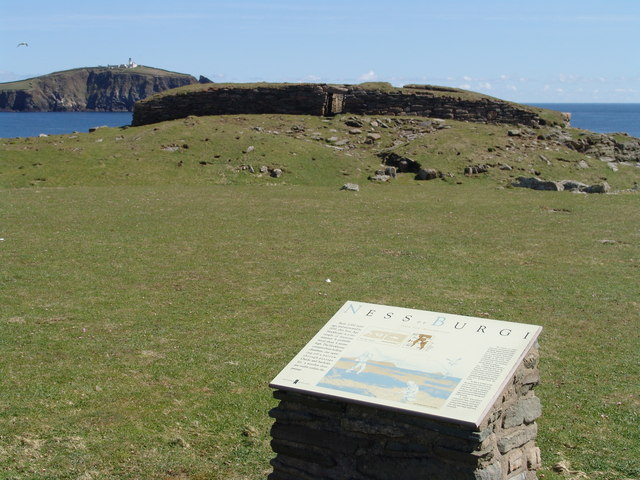
Ness of Burgi fort Iron Age blockhouse at the Ness of Burgi. Sumburgh Head lighthouse in the distance

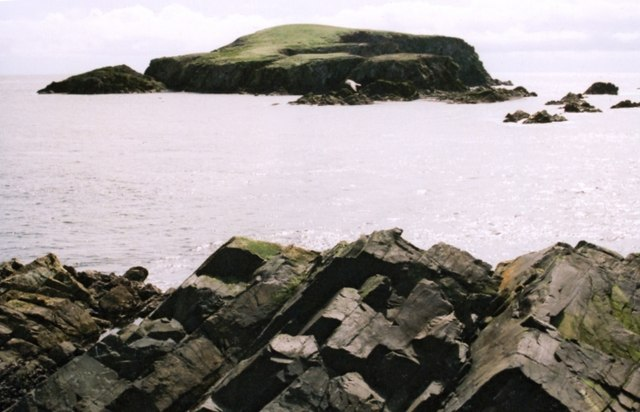
Horse Island from Hog of the Ness
