= List of Category A listed buildings in Shetland =

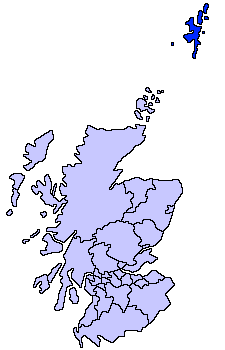
Shetland shown within Scotland

This is a list of Category A listed buildings in Shetland, Scotland.

In Scotland, the term listed building refers to a building or other structure officially designated as being of "special architectural or historic interest". Category A structures are those considered to be buildings of "national or international importance, either architecturally or historically". Listing was begun by a provision in the Town and Country Planning (Scotland) Act 1947, and the current legislative basis for listing is the Planning (Listed Buildings and Conservation Areas) (Scotland) Act 1997. The authority for listing rests with Historic Environment Scotland, an executive agency of the Scottish Government, which inherited this role from the Scottish Development Department in 1991. Once listed, severe restrictions are imposed on the modifications allowed to a building's structure or its fittings. Listed building consent must be obtained from local authorities prior to any alteration to such a structure. There are approximately 47,000 listed buildings in Scotland, of which around 8 per cent (some 3,800) are Category A.

The council area of Shetland comprises an archipelago of around 100 islands, including 15 inhabited islands with a total population of around 20,000. There are 11 Category A listed buildings on the islands, representing a range of building dates and types. Two lighthouses merit Category A listing: Sumburgh Head Lighthouse is described as "one of Scotland's finest surviving pieces of early 19th century architecture"; while the Muckle Flugga Lighthouse is Britain's most northerly building. Other functional buildings include the grain mill at Quendale, and the waterfront warehouses at The Lodberrie in Lerwick, said to be "the most photographed building in Shetland." There are a number of haas, or laird's houses, of the 17th and 18th centuries. The 17th-century Fort Charlotte was burnt by the Dutch in 1673, and was rebuilt during the American Revolutionary War (1775–1783), though it saw no action in that conflict.

== Listed buildings ==
Name	Location	Date listed	Geo-coordinates	Notes	LB number	Image
Quendale Mill	Quendale, Mainland	18 October 1977	59°54′09″N 1°20′19″W	19th-century grain mill, including dam, steading, walls, and bridge	5417	Upload another image See more images
Sumburgh Head Lighthouse	Sumburgh Head, Mainland	18 October 1977	59°51′15″N 1°16′30″W	19th-century lighthouse, designed by Robert Stevenson, including ancillary buildings	5442	Upload another image See more images
Gardie House	Bressay	13 August 1971	60°09′36″N 1°07′23″W	18th-century country house with later additions	5880	Upload another image See more images
Belmont House	Belmont, Unst	13 August 1971	60°41′18″N 0°58′02″W	18th-century Georgian house, including farm cottage and steading	17474	Upload another image See more images
North Unst Lighthouse	Muckle Flugga, north of Unst	13 August 1971	60°51′19″N 0°53′07″W	19th-century lighthouse, designed by David and Thomas Stevenson	17479	Upload another image See more images
Old Haa Of Scalloway	New Street, Scalloway	8 November 1974	60°08′13″N 1°16′30″W	18th-century laird's house	18558	Upload Photo
North Haa (West Sandwick House)	West Sandwick, Yell	13 August 1971	60°34′22″N 1°11′20″W	17th-century laird's house with later alterations	18648	Upload another image
Haa of Sand	Sand, Mainland	13 August 1971	60°12′25″N 1°22′50″W	18th-century classical laird's house	18693	Upload another image See more images
The Lodberrie	20 Commercial Street, Lerwick	8 December 1971	60°09′10″N 1°08′21″W	Later 18th-century house and stores on sea wall	37242	Upload another image See more images
Fort Charlotte	Commercial Road And Harbour Street, Lerwick	8 December 1971	60°09′19″N 1°08′43″W	17th-century fort, rebuilt in 1781	37255	Upload another image
Brough Lodge	Fetlar	30 March 1998	60°36′43″N 0°56′39″W	19th-century picturesque Gothic Revival lodge house	45269	Upload another image See more images

== See also ==
- Scheduled monuments in Shetland
