= Bigton =

Coordinates: 59.974°N 1.323°W

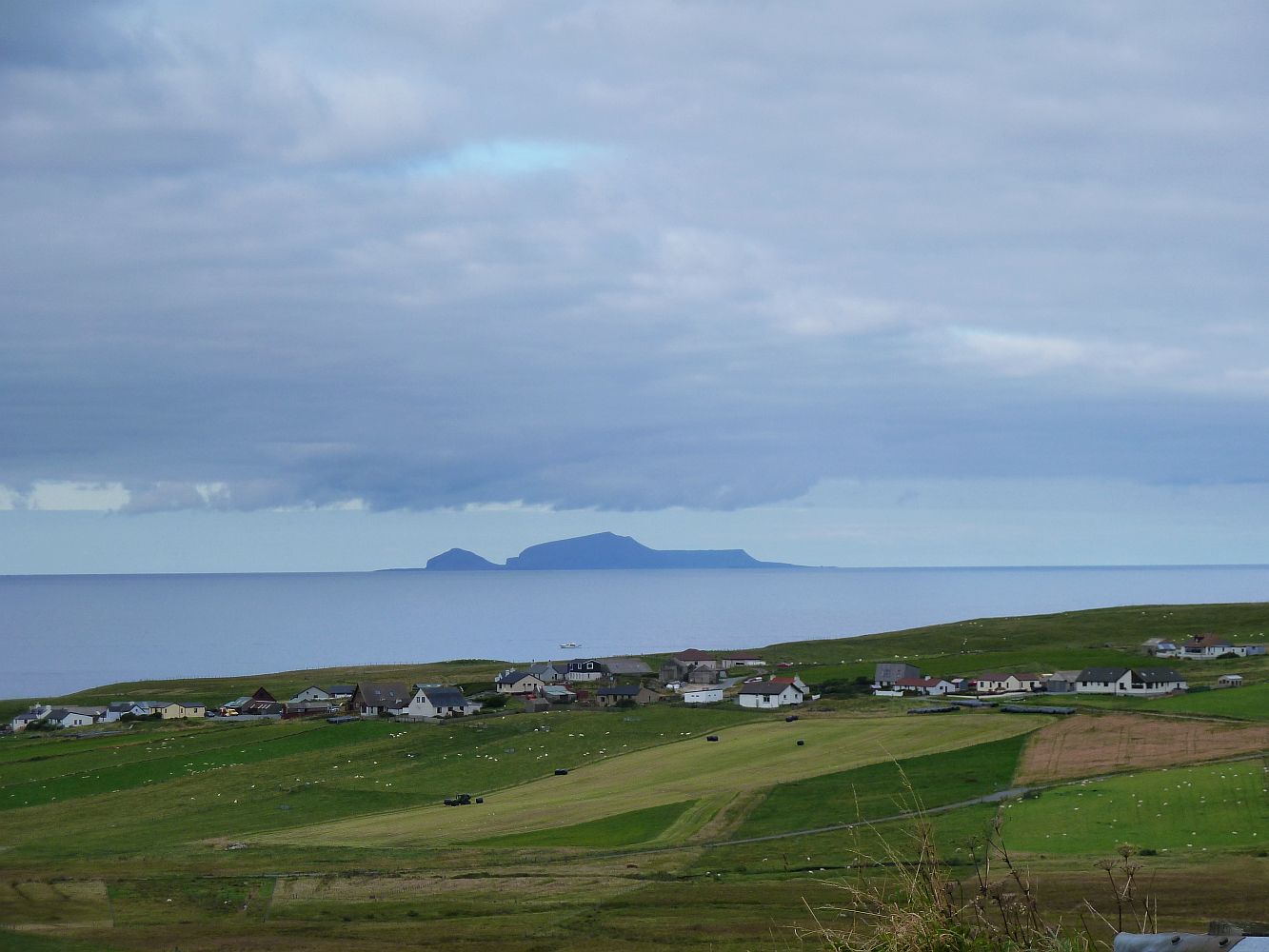
- A view over Bigton and across the sea to Foula

- Location within Shetland
- OS grid reference: HU377211
- Civil parish: Dunrossness
- Council area: Shetland
- Lieutenancy area: Shetland
- Country: Scotland
- Sovereign state: United Kingdom
- Post town: SHETLAND
- Postcode district: ZE2
- Dialling code: 01950
- Police: Scotland
- Fire: Scottish
- Ambulance: Scottish
- UK Parliament: Orkney and Shetland
- Scottish Parliament: Shetland

Bigton (Shaetlan pronunciation: [ˈbɪktən] BIK-tən) is a small settlement on South Mainland, Shetland, Scotland. Bigton is within the civil parish of Dunrossness. The Stewarts owned Bigton from 1634.

Bigton lies on the Atlantic coast of the island overlooking St Ninian's Isle and within view is the island of Burra, further to the north. It is 18 miles (29 kilometres) by road from Lerwick, just off the B9122 and lies just north of the settlement of Scousburgh. The smaller settlement of Ireland adjoins Bigton.

The 33 ton sloop the "Alexander" in 1793, the sloop the "Earl Spencer" (a smuggler) in 1822, the 30 ton three masted lugger "Sacre Cour" in 1897, the 24 ton three masted lugger "Jeune Albert" in 1902 and the 30 ton lugger "Rene" in 1904 were wrecked in St Ninian's Bay just off Bigton.

Facilities include a community shop and post office as well as a cafe. In 2021, Bigton Kirk, a category C listed building by the Scottish Government, was sold by the Church of Scotland to Bigton Collective who converted it into a community centre. Farming in the area is a mixture of arable and mixed livestock.

Bigton House is a category B listed building by the Scottish Government and is designated a place of special historic and architectural interest by Historic Environment Scotland. John Bruce, the 4th of Symbister, married Clementina Stewart of Bigton in 1744, at which point he adopted the additional surname Stewart and later, in 1788, constructed Bigton house. When the Reverend George Low visited in 1774, he described Bigton as the largest farm in Shetland, richly productive with barley and oats “as fine as any found in the south of Scotland.”

The author, filmmaker and painter Elizabeth Balneaves lived in Bigton's former manse with her husband, Dr. James McLauchlan Johnston, for the last 20 years of Balneaves' life.
