= Exnaboe =

Coordinates: 59.891°N 1.296°W

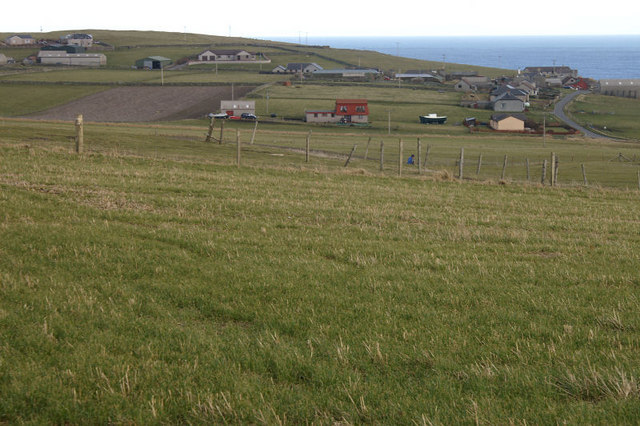
- The settlement of Exnaboe viewed from the west

- Location within Shetland
- OS grid reference: HU393119
- Civil parish: Dunrossness
- Council area: Shetland
- Lieutenancy area: Shetland
- Country: Scotland
- Sovereign state: United Kingdom
- Post town: SHETLAND
- Postcode district: ZE3
- Dialling code: 01950
- Police: Scotland
- Fire: Scottish
- Ambulance: Scottish
- UK Parliament: Orkney and Shetland
- Scottish Parliament: Shetland

Exnaboe, locally referred to as 'bö', is a settlement in the Virkie area of the parish of Dunrossness, South Mainland, Shetland, Scotland, overlooking Sumburgh Airport, and the Pool of Virkie.

== Sources ==
- This article is based on http://shetlopedia.com/Exnaboe a GFDL wiki.
