= West Voe of Sumburgh =

Bay on the Shetland Mainland

Coordinates: 59°52′0″N 1°17′45″W

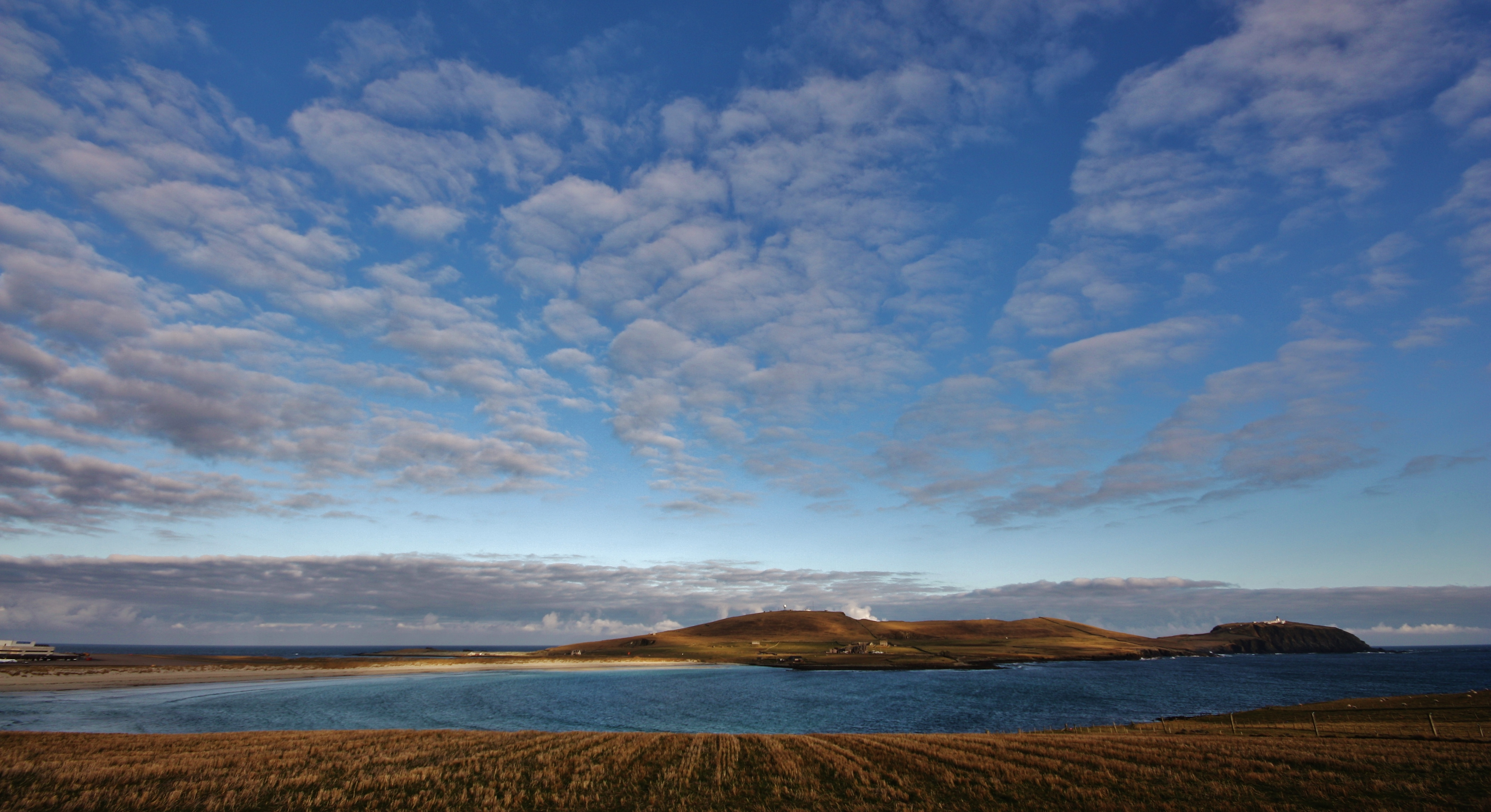
A view across West Voe of Sumburgh from Scatness. On the left is Sumburgh Airport, in the centre is Jarlshof and on the far right is Sumburgh Head and Lighthouse (2014).

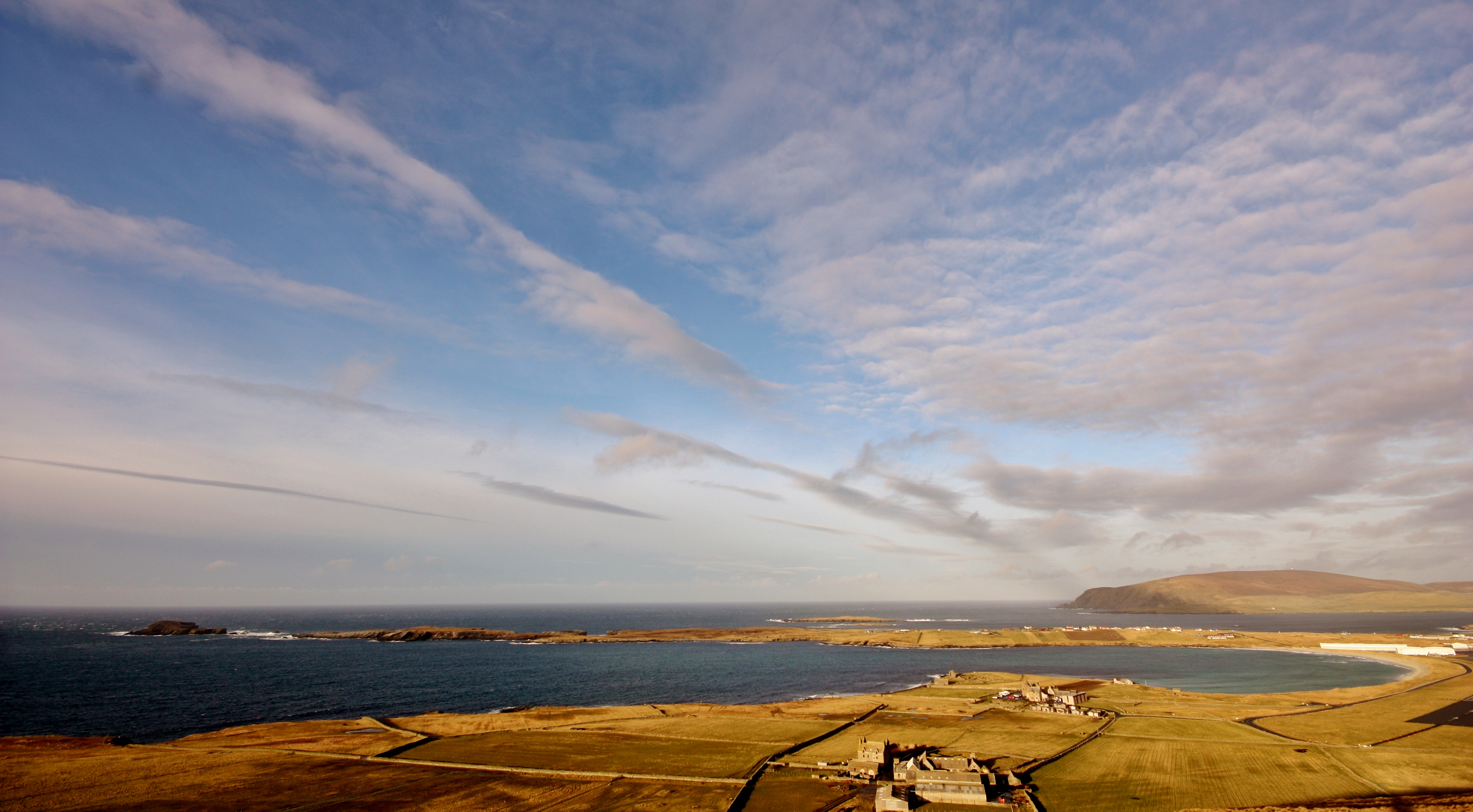
A wide angle view of West Voe of Sumburgh taken from Compass Head (2017)

The West Voe of Sumburgh (grid reference: HU 395 088) is the most southerly bay on the Shetland Mainland, located between Sumburgh Head, and the point of Scat Ness.

On the west side of the voe is the settlement of Scatness, while on the east side is the famous Jarlshof archaeological site. There are Late Mesolithic and Early Neolithic remains at West Voe.

Across the opening of the voe, past Sumburgh Head, is the tidal stream known as the Sumburgh Roost.

== Sources ==
- This article is based on http://shetlopedia.com/West_Voe_of_Sumburgh a GFDL wiki.
