= Ness of Burgi fort =

Iron-age Scottish fort

- Mainland, Shetland, Scotland
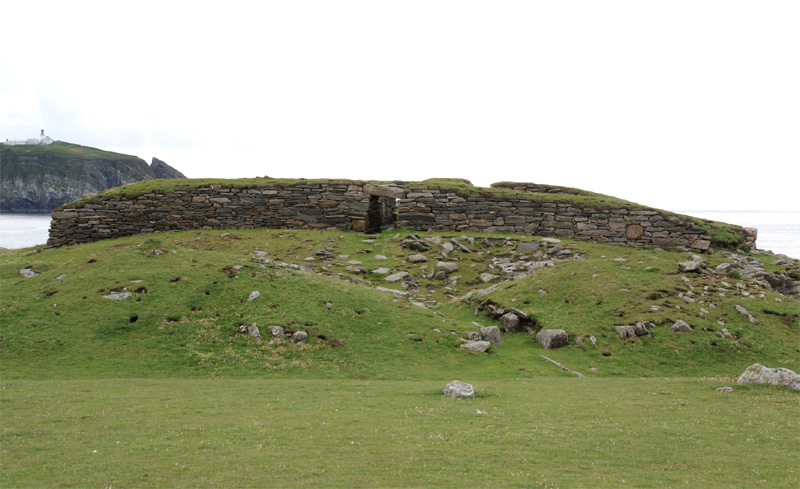
- Ness of Burgi fort from the west

Site information
- Condition: Ruined

Location
- Coordinates: 59.859013°N 1.308961°W

Site history
- Built: Iron age
- Materials: Stone

Designations

Scheduled monument
- Official name: Ness of Burgi, promontory fort
- Designated: 19 June 1934
- Reference no.: SM90226

The Ness of Burgi fort is an iron-age promontory fort in the Old Scatness archaeological site on the Ness of Burgi, a narrow finger of land reaching south from the Scat Ness in the far south of the island of Mainland, Shetland in Scotland.

== Location ==
The fort is about 1 mile (1.6 km) south from the village of Scatness, in the parish of Dunrossness, and may be reached by foot along a grass path that leads to the headland of the Ness of Burgi. The fort is on a rocky promontory on the east side of the Ness and is open to the public at all times.

== Structure ==
The blockhouse, probably built about 100 BC seems to be excessively large for the area that it protects, and so was perhaps more designed to impress rather than to defend. The blockhouse structure seems to have been built as an integral part of the defensive wall. The walls do not reach the edges of the cliffs on either side. There is no evidence that they once reached further and since have been shortened through natural or human activity. The ends are properly finished. It seems that the gaps were deliberate, and defense was not a primary concern. In fact, there are other points on the promontory that provide equally good natural defensive positions.

There may be some similarity in this incomplete defensive wall with the forework of the Broch of Clickimin, the Huxter Fort and the Crosskirk Broch. These works may be seen as prototypes that evolved into the brochs that were later built in the islands and the Scottish and Irish mainlands.

== Gallery ==
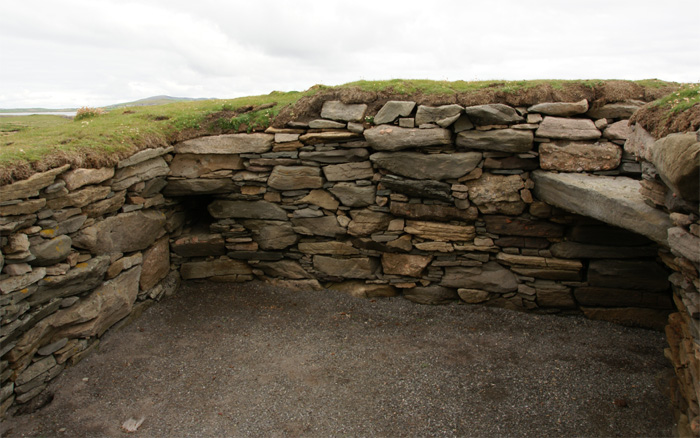
South chamber (from the east)

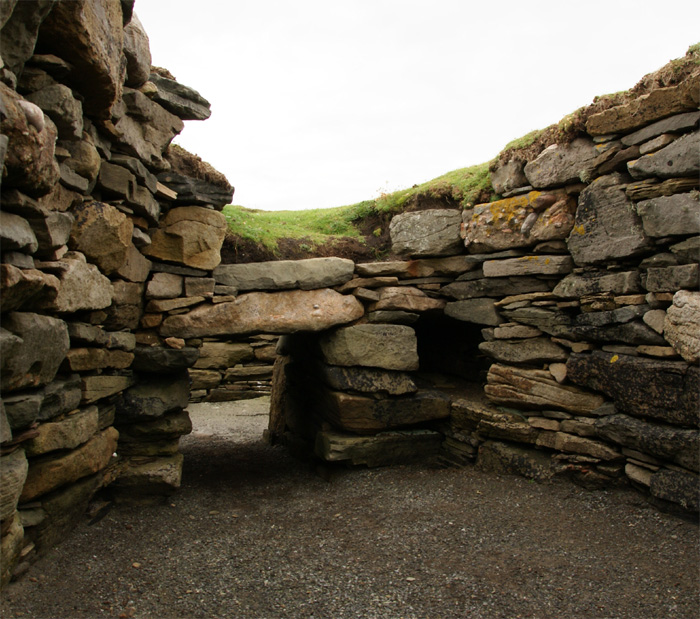
Entrance to the north chamber from inside the chamber looking to the south

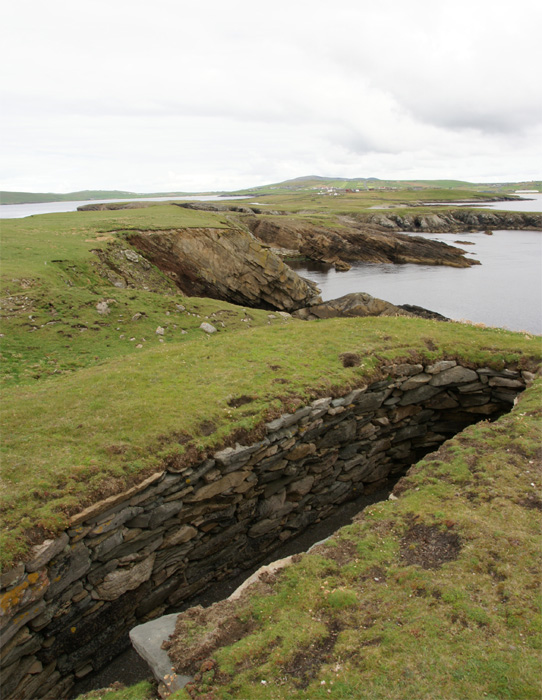
North chamber from the south and above

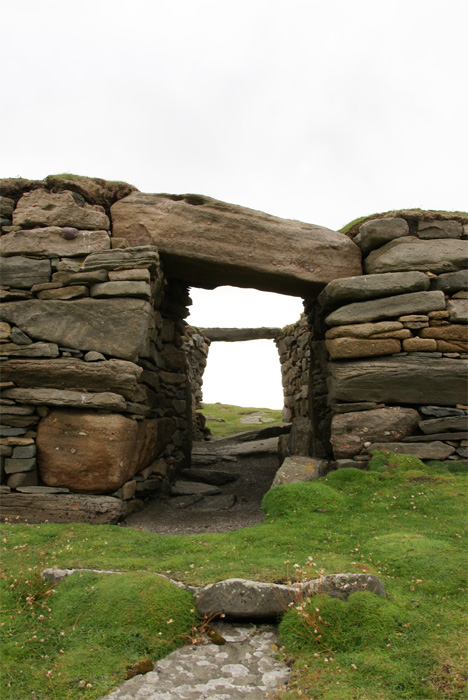
Entrance from the west into the passage

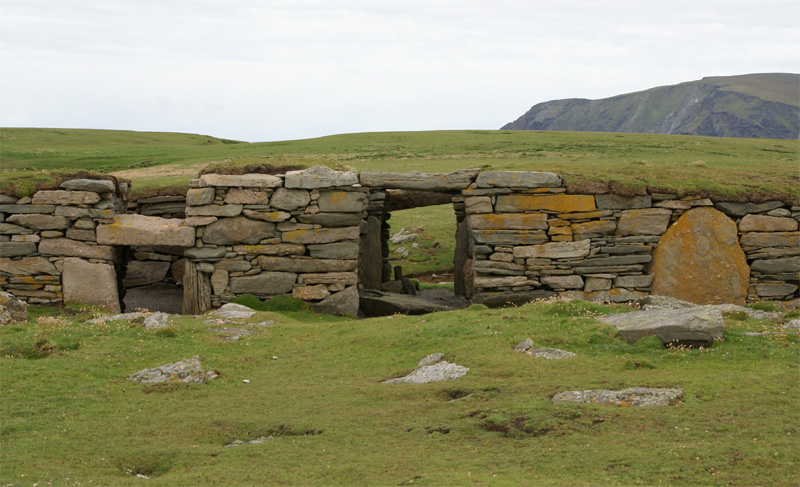
Entrances viewed from the east

== Notes and references ==
Citations

Sources

- Cunliffe, Barry (10 September 2012). Iron Age Communities in Britain: An Account of England, Scotland and Wales from the Seventh Century BC until the Roman Conquest. Routledge. ISBN 978-1-134-93803-2.
- Fairhurst, Horace; Breeze, David John (1984). Excavations at CrossKirk Broch, Caithness. Society Antiquaries Scotland. ISBN 978-0-903903-03-5.
- Green, Miranda (6 December 2012). The Celtic World. Psychology Press. ISBN 978-0-415-05764-6.
- Harding, Dennis William (2004). The Iron Age in Northern Britain: Celts and Romans, Natives and Invaders. Psychology Press. p. 150. ISBN 978-0-415-30150-3.
- Uney, Graham (9 September 2010). Walking on the Orkney and Shetland Isles: 80 Walks in the Northern Isles. Cicerone Press Limited. ISBN 978-1-85284-572-8.
