= Muckle Flugga Lighthouse =

Lighthouse in the Shetland Islands

Muckle Flugga Lighthouse Muckle Flugga Lighthouse
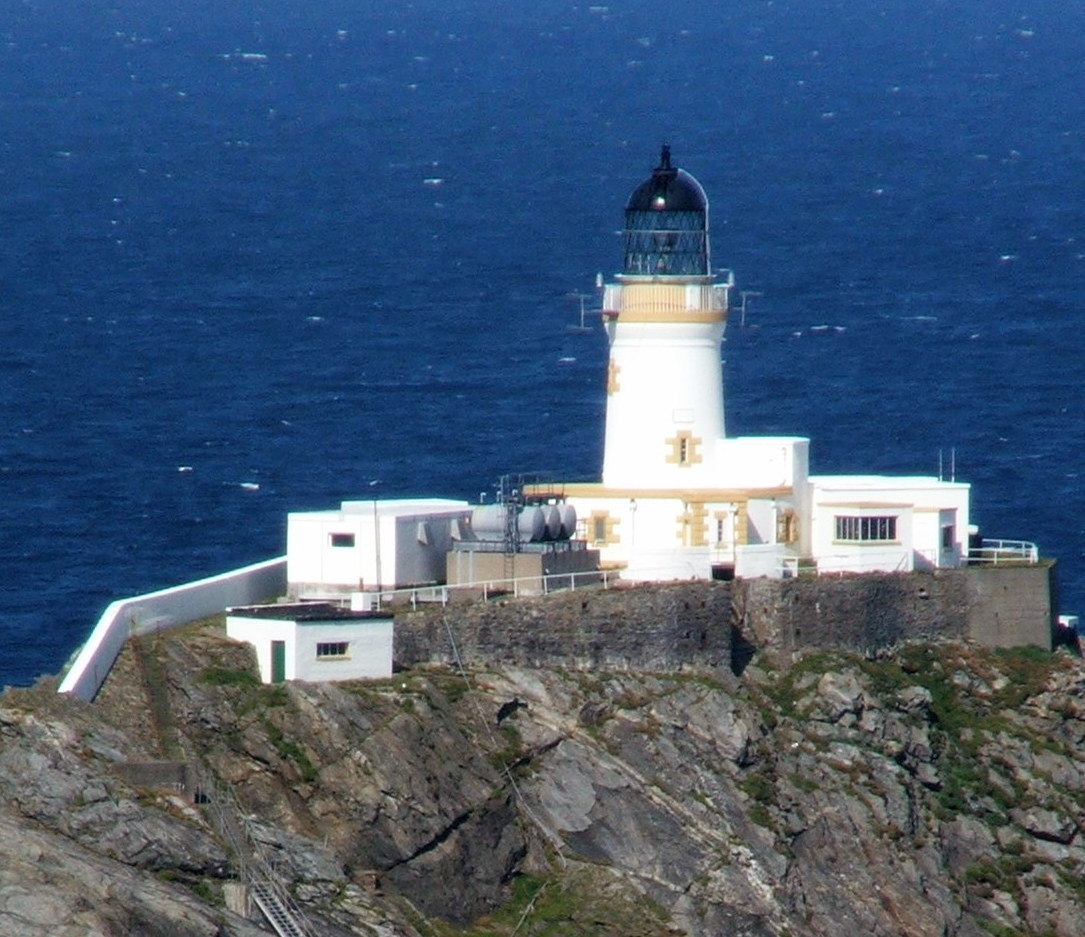
- Location: Muckle Flugga, Shetland, Unst, United Kingdom
- OS grid: HP6066619679
- Coordinates: 60°51′19″N 0°53′07″W

Tower
- Designed by: Thomas Stevenson, David Stevenson
- Construction: masonry
- Automated: March 1995
- Height: 20 m (66 ft)
- Shape: cylinder
- Markings: White (tower), black (lantern), ochre (trim)
- Operator: Northern Lighthouse Board
- Heritage: category A listed building

Light
- First lit: 1 January 1858
- Focal height: 66 m (217 ft)
- Range: 22 nmi (41 km; 25 mi)
- Characteristic: Fl(2) W 20s

Muckle Flugga lighthouse punctuates the rocky stack of Muckle Flugga, in Shetland, Scotland. Originally called North Unst Lighthouse, it was renamed in 1964.

The brothers Thomas and David Stevenson designed and built the lighthouse in 1854, originally to protect ships during the Crimean War. First lit on 1 January 1858, it stands 64 feet (20 m) high, and has 103 steps to the top. Muckle-Flugga Lighthouse is Britain's most northerly lighthouse, whilst also being the second most northerly man-made structure in the United Kingdom, second only to the adjacent helipad. The light beam flashes white every 20 seconds, with a nominal range of 22 nautical miles (41km). In March 1995 it was fully automated.

Thomas's son Robert Louis Stevenson, the writer, visited it as a young man (on 18 June 1869). As a result, Unst became his inspiration for the map of "Treasure Island". The lighthouse was served by the Grace Darling which was launched from the boat house below the lighthouse shore station in Burrafirth. Supplies were winched up by the blondin cable hoist to the courtyard, from the boat in a natural cleft of the rocks that provides a degree of harbourage.

This lighthouse was also used as a setting for the wartime comedy Back-Room Boy.

== History ==
In 1851 it was decided to build a lighthouse on North Unst. David Stevenson went to inspect the site but on two occasions he was unsuccessful. He did not believe if was practical or that ships would use a close route. The proposed site was not flat. Water was known to pass at a height of 200 feet and Stevenson observed a huge six tonne piece of rock that had been removed by the waves, eighty feet above the sea. The admiralty were insistent as they remembered ships lost in 1811 that resulted in a loss of life that exceeded the Battle of Trafalgar.

During the Crimean War, the government urged the commissioners to set up a light on Muckle Flugga to protect Her Majesty's ships. A temporary lighthouse 50 feet (15 m) high was built 200 feet (61 m) above sea level and lit on 11 October 1854. It had been built by a 100 tonnes of material in addition to locally quarried rock. It was thought to be high and safe enough to withstand the elements, but when winter storms began waves broke heavily on the tower and burst open the door to the living quarters.

The principal keeper reported that 40 feet (12 m) of stone dyke had been broken down, and the keepers had no dry place to sit or sleep. Plans were made for a higher and more permanent lighthouse, but there were still disagreements about where to locate it, Muckle Flugga or Lamba Ness. The orders to start the work on the new Muckle Flugga tower were finally given in June 1855. It was completed in 1857 after a huge effort as every item had to be transported and carried to the top. It was decided to use bricks as it was easier to transport.

The lighthouse's original name was "North Unst", but in 1964 that was changed to "Muckle Flugga".

== Lighthouse keepers ==
- The initial team of 4 keepers comprised (1854-6) Thomas Marchbanks, William Mills, James Taylor, Alexander Garnochan.
- Robert Laidlaw 1867-70
- Russell Powell 1977–1990
- Thomas J. M. Hutchison 1949–1962

== Muckle Flugga Shore Station ==
Muckle Flugga was one of the few lighthouses in Scotland which had a separate shore station that served as accommodation for the lighthouse keepers when they were off duty (similar to Sule Skerry and its shore station in Stromness, Orkney). The shore station was sold off when the lighthouse was automated. Part of the building now hosts the Hermaness Visitor Centre at the entrance to the neighbouring Hermaness National Nature Reserve, which is managed by NatureScot.

== See also ==
- List of lighthouses in Scotland
- List of Northern Lighthouse Board lighthouses
- List of Category A listed buildings in Shetland

== Bibliography ==
- Hughson, Rhoda (2008). Muckle Flugga The Impossible Lighthouse. Unst Heritage Trust.
- Lynn, P.A. (2017). Scottish Lighthouse Pioneers: Travels with the Stevensons in Orkney and Shetland. Whittles Publishing. ISBN 978-1-84995-265-1.
- McNeil, Robert (21 May 2023). "and its lighthouse that's like no other …". The Herald.
