= Dunrossness =

Parish of Shetland, Scotland

Coordinates: 59°56′17″N 1°18′14″W

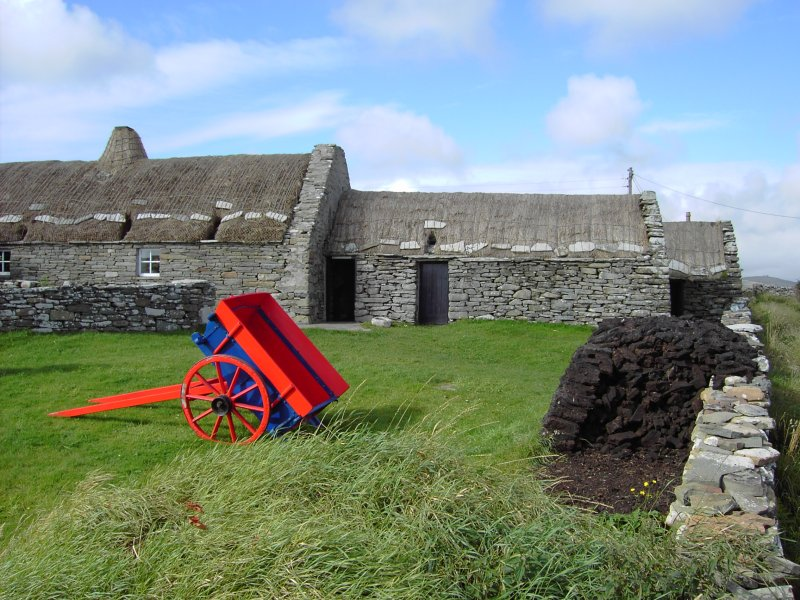
The Shetland Crofthouse Museum at Dunrossness

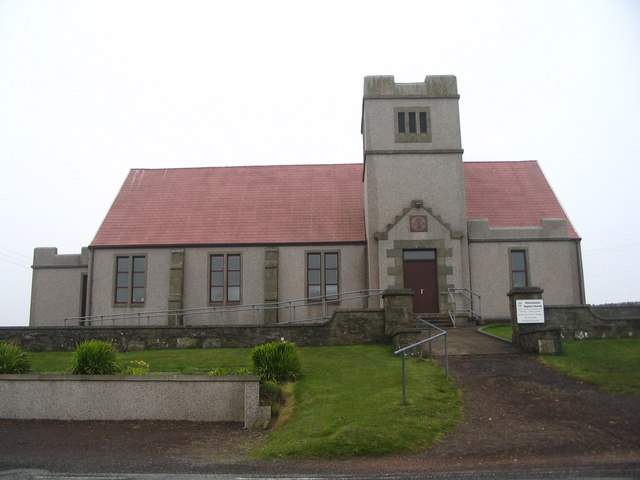
Dunrossness Baptist Church

Dunrossness (Old Norse: Dynrastarnes meaning "headland of the loud tide-race", referring to the noise of Sumburgh Roost) is the southernmost parish of Shetland, Scotland. Historically the name Dunrossness has usually referred to the area on the Shetland mainland south of Quarff. However, in 2016 there were three separate Shetland Community Councils for a) Gulberwick, Quarff and Cunningsburgh; b) Sandwick; and c) Dunrossness. The 2011 census defined Dunrossness as including everybody within the British ZE2 postal code, which goes as far north as Gulberwick. It has the best and largest area of fertile farmland of any parish in Shetland. Dunrossness includes the island of Mousa, Levenwick, St Ninian's Isle, Bigton, Scousburgh, the Lochs of Spiggie and Brow, Boddam, Quendale, Virkie, Exnaboe, Grutness, Toab, Ness of Burgi, Clumlie Broch, Scatness, Sumburgh Airport, Sumburgh Head, West Voe, the islands of Lady's Holm, Little Holm, Horse Holm island and Fair Isle.

== Archaeology ==
Dunrossness had 1,505 sites of archaeological interest in 2016, 181 of them scheduled (i.e. nationally important). For example, Jarlshof, perhaps the best known prehistoric archaeological site in Shetland and Old Scatness (which has mediaeval, Viking, Pictish, and Iron Age remains) both lie within the parish of Dunrossness. Another example is the lost township of Broo (other spellings include Brew and Brow) near Quendale Beach. Broo was headed by the wealthy Sinclair family and was inhabited until probably the last decades of the 17th century when the buildings were covered with up to two metres of sand and abandoned. These have been excavated since 1997.

== Bothwell and the Pelican ==
After the battle of Carberry Hill in 1567, James Hepburn, 4th Earl of Bothwell came to Dunrossness and talked with the official Olave Sinclair at the house at Brow. Bothwell bargained for a ship with a merchant from Bremen called Gerdt Hemeling, and took his ship, the Pelican, to Denmark.

== Residents and visitors ==
Dunrossness is associated with a number of eminent people, such as Haldane Burgess, George Stewart, Sir Herbert J.C. Grierson, Jenny Gilbertson, Elizabeth Balneaves as well as that symbol of providence Betty Mouat. The author Sir Walter Scott visited Dunrossness in 1814 and wrote the novel The Pirate, which is set mostly in the Parish. Robert Stevenson built Shetland's first lighthouse at Sumburgh Head in 1821, and his son Thomas Stevenson and his grandson, the author Robert Louis Stevenson, visited the Shetland lighthouses and Fair Isle in 1870.

== Pilot whales ==
Quendale beach was the site of the largest whale-kill ever recorded in Shetland in 1845 when 1,540 Long-finned Pilot Whales were driven ashore.

== MV Braer ==
In 1993 the oil tanker MV Braer ran aground on Garths Ness in Dunrossness releasing 85,000 tons of crude oil one of the worst oil spills in Shetland's history.

== Sources ==
- This article is based on http://shetlopedia.com/Dunrossness a GFDL wiki.
