= Toab, Shetland =

Coordinates: 59.889°N 1.307°W

Toab
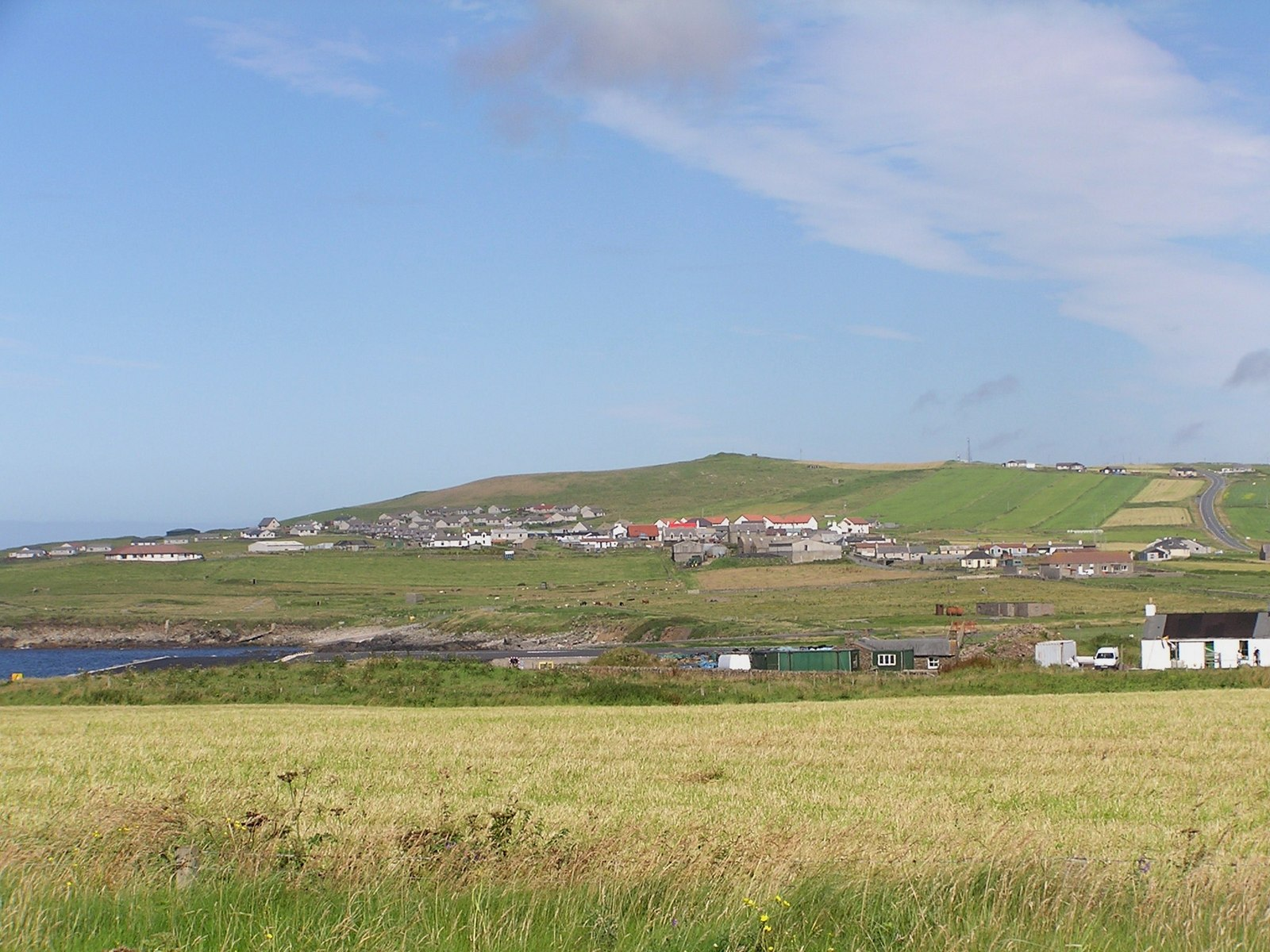
- Toab, Virkie

- Location within Shetland
- OS grid reference: HU387116
- Civil parish: Dunrossness
- Council area: Shetland
- Lieutenancy area: Shetland
- Country: Scotland
- Sovereign state: United Kingdom
- Post town: SHETLAND
- Postcode district: ZE3
- Dialling code: 01950
- Police: Scotland
- Fire: Scottish
- Ambulance: Scottish
- UK Parliament: Orkney and Shetland
- Scottish Parliament: Shetland

Toab is the southernmost village on Mainland, Shetland, Scotland. It is part of Virkie and overlooks Sumburgh Airport. Toab is within the parish of Dunrossness.

The name Toab may come from the old Norse hópr or hóp meaning a small landlocked bay or lagoon.
