= St Ninian's Isle =

Island in Shetland, United Kingdom

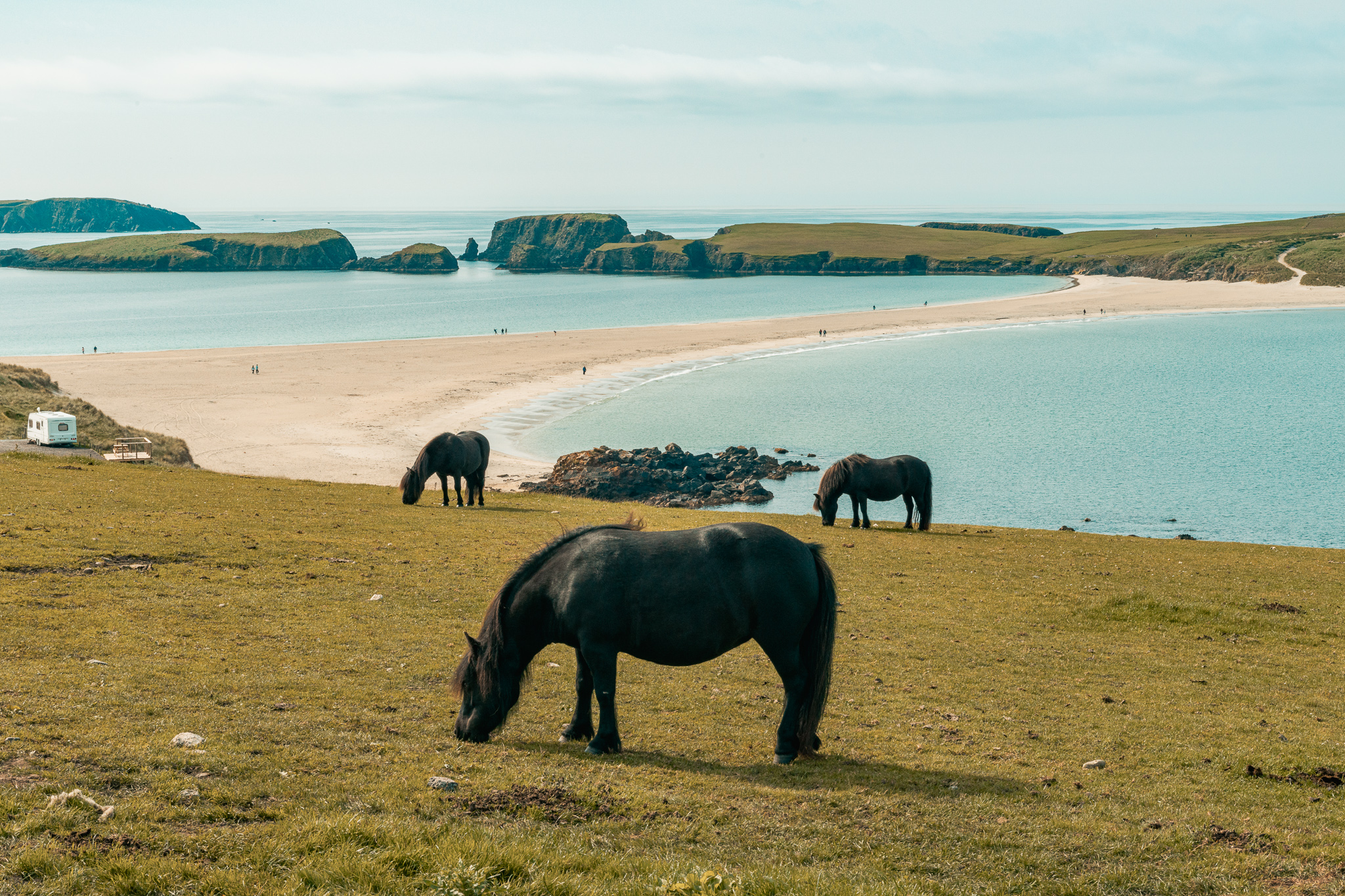

Location
- Location within Scotland
- OS grid reference: HU365210
- Coordinates: 59.97°N 1.35°W

Physical geography
- Island group: Shetland
- Area: c. 72 ha
- Area rank: Unknown
- Highest elevation: 53 m (174 ft)

Administration
- Council area: Shetland
- Country: Scotland
- Sovereign state: United Kingdom

Demographics
- Population: last inhabited 1796

St Ninian's Isle is a small tied island connected by the largest tombolo in the UK to the south-western coast of the Mainland, Shetland, in Scotland. It is part of the civil parish of Dunrossness on the South Mainland. The tombolo, known locally as an ayre from the Old Norse for "gravel bank", is 500 metres long. During the summer the tombolo is above sea level and accessible to walkers. During winter, stronger wave action removes sand from the beach so that it is usually covered at high tide, and occasionally throughout the tidal cycle, until the sand is returned the following spring. Depending on the definition used, St. Ninian's is thus either an island, or a peninsula; it has an area of about 72 hectares.

The nearest settlement is Bigton, also in the parish of Dunrossness. The important early medieval St Ninian's Isle Treasure of metalwork, mostly in silver, was discovered under the church floor in 1958. Many seabirds, including puffins, visit the island, with several species nesting there.

== History ==
As its name suggests, the island has ecclesiastical connections, which may like others in the Northern Isles, Hebrides and Faroes have connections to the Culdees or papar. However, the island's history is far older than Christianity, and Neolithic graves have been found within the walls of the chapel (formerly beneath the floor).

The ruins of a 12th-century chapel are visible near the end of the tombolo. The dedication is to Shetland's patron saint, Saint Ninian of Galloway, who is also widely venerated on the nearby Orkney Islands, and may be commemorated in the name of North Ronaldsay. In 1958, an excavation found a hoard of 8th century silver in the chapel grounds under a stone slab in a wooden box, which caused a renewed archaeological interest in the island. It was suspected to have been buried to hide it from, or stolen in, a Viking raid. The remains of a pre-Norse chapel were also found, which may indicate some kind of Culdee presence.

The last family to live on the island, that of Henry Leask, left the island in 1796. Henry Leask was married twice and had 13 children.

== St Ninian's Isle Treasure ==
The St Ninian's Isle Treasure was discovered under a cross-marked slab in the floor of the early St. Ninian's church, on 4 July 1958 by a local schoolboy, Douglas Coutts. Coutts was helping visiting archaeologists led by Professor A. C. O'Dell of Aberdeen University at a dig on the isle. The silver bowls, jewellery and other pieces, not all of which were probably new when deposited, are believed to date from c.750–825 AD.

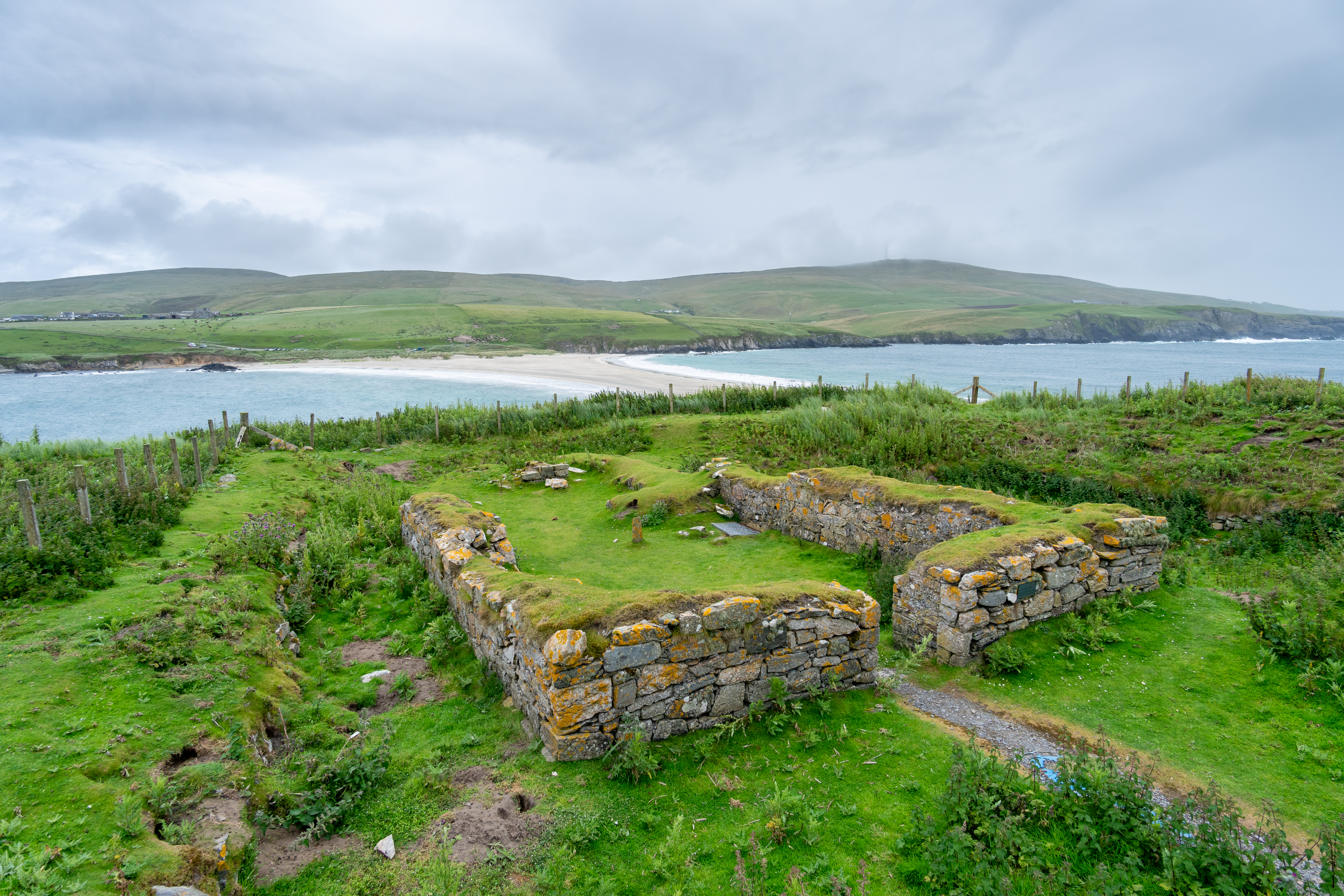
Ruins of St Ninian's chapel, where the treasure was discovered

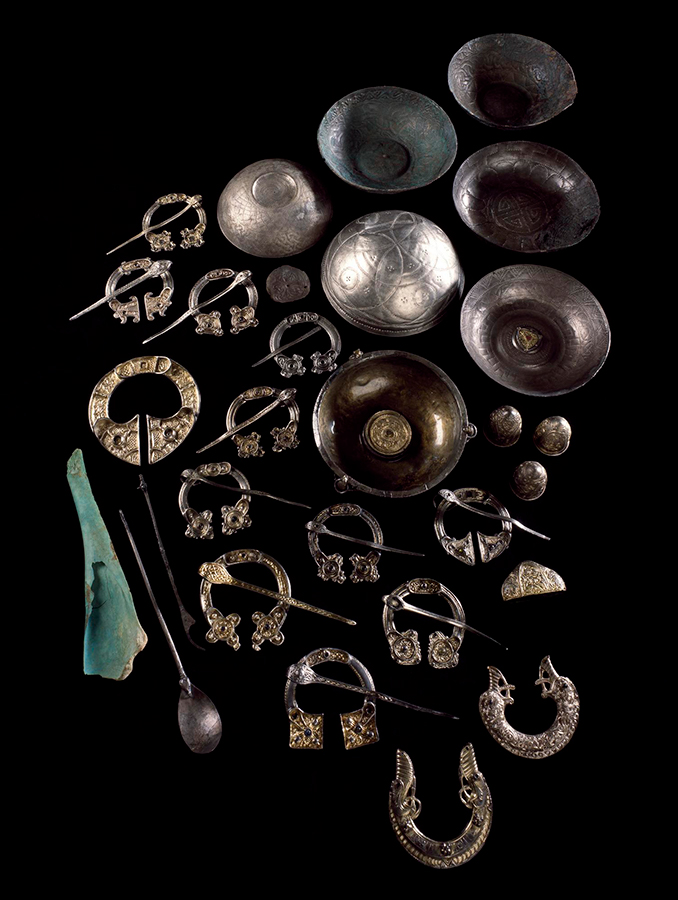
Early medieval hoard of Pictish silver objects dated c AD 800

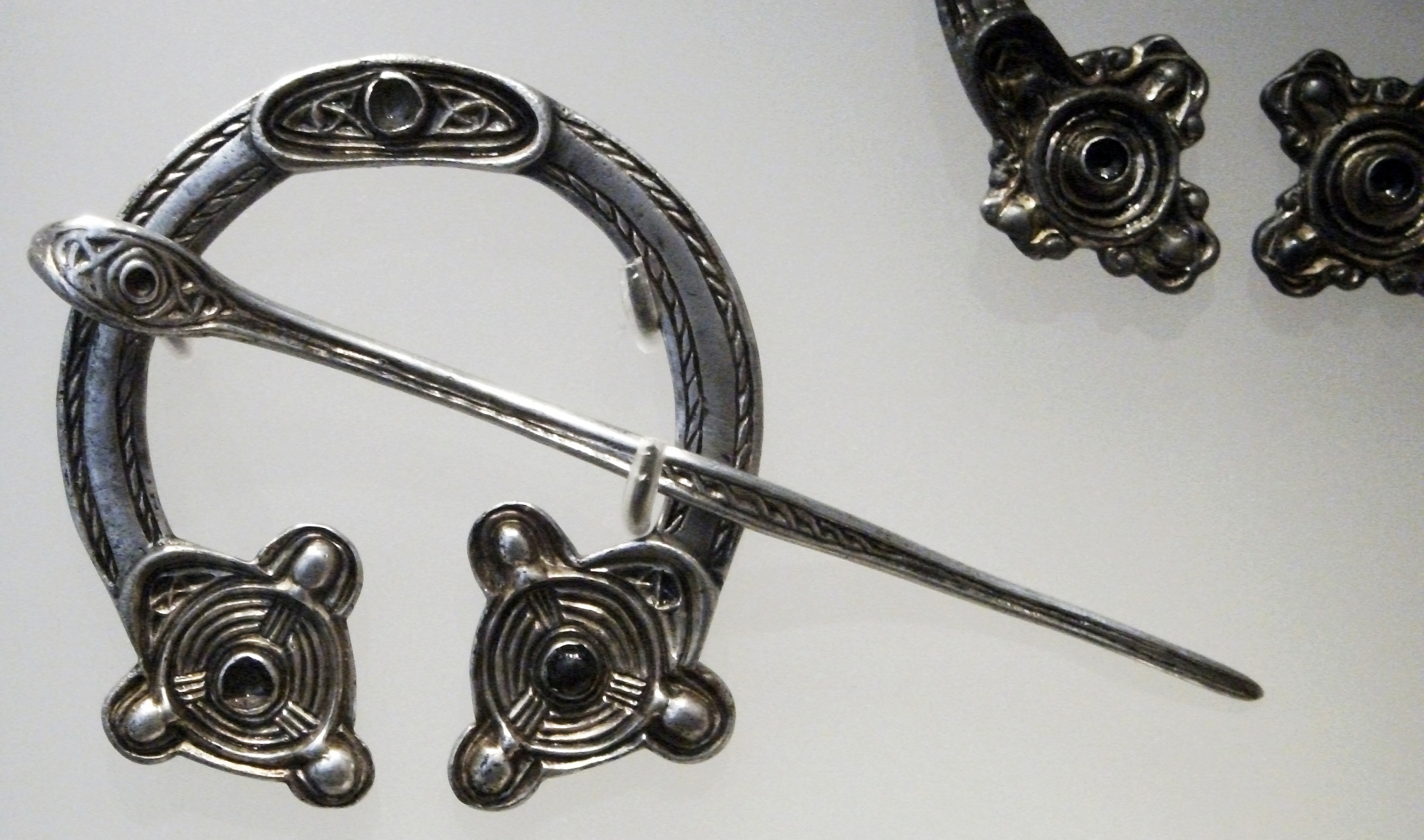
pennanular brooch

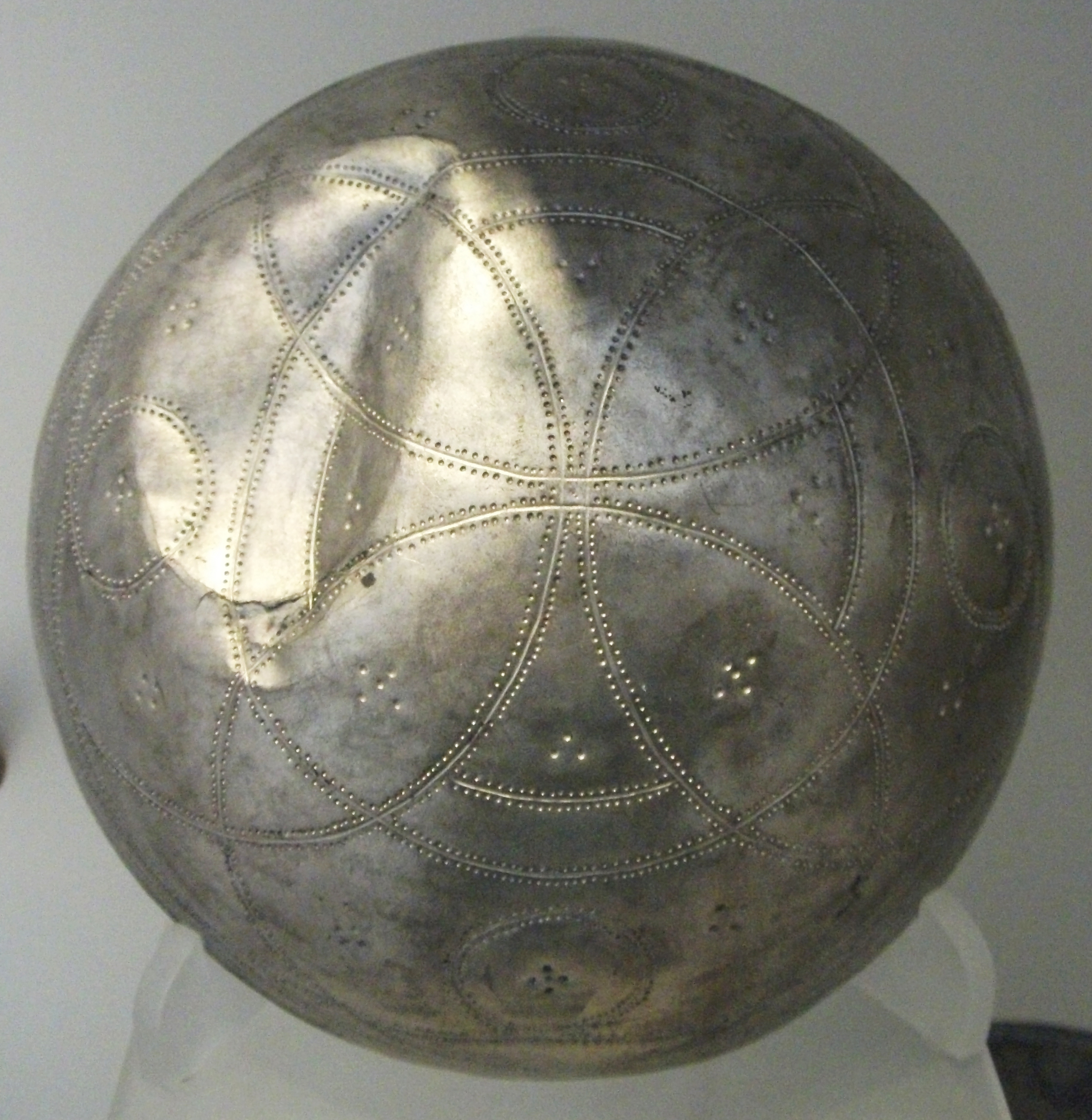
Bowl

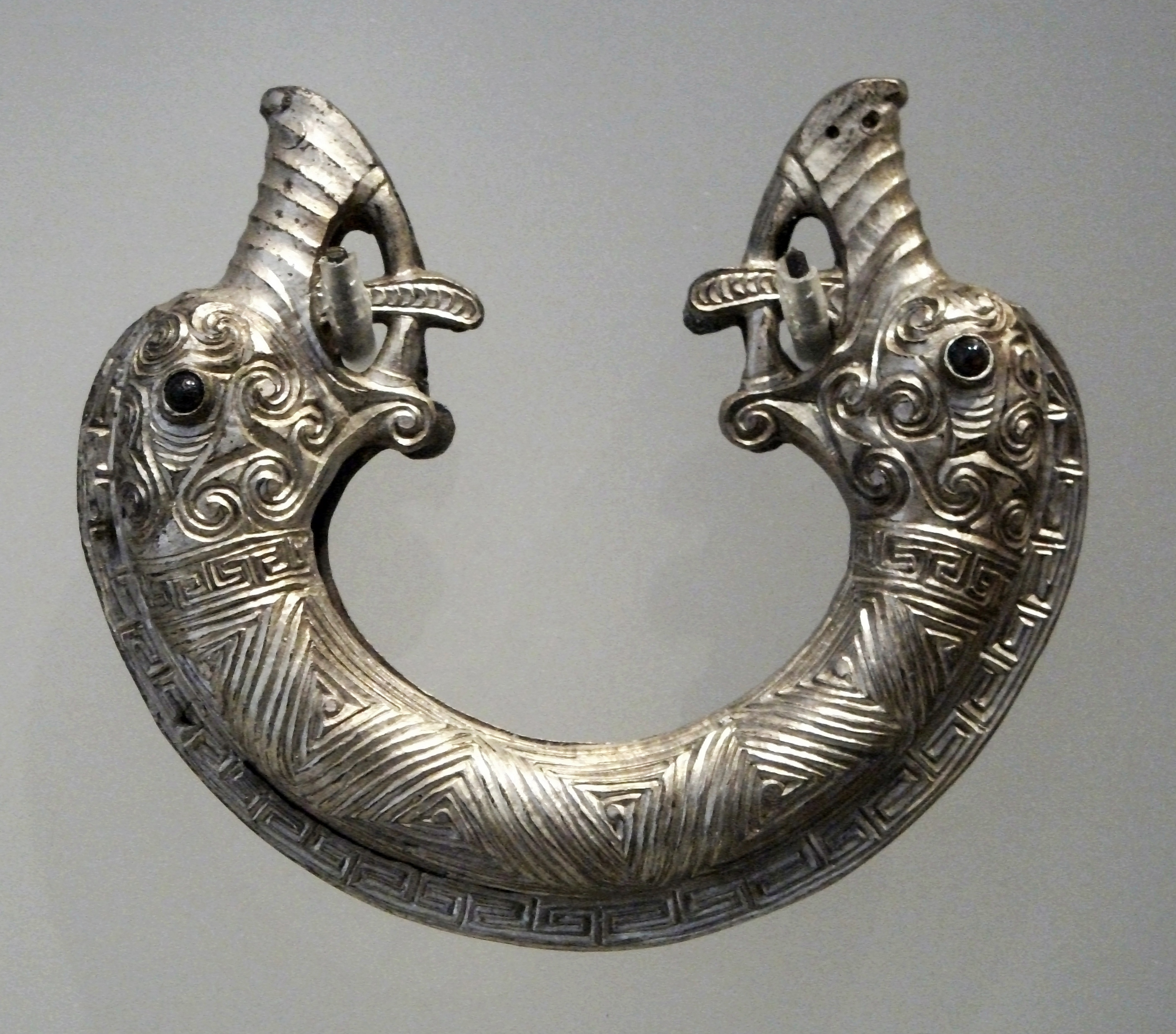
Chape

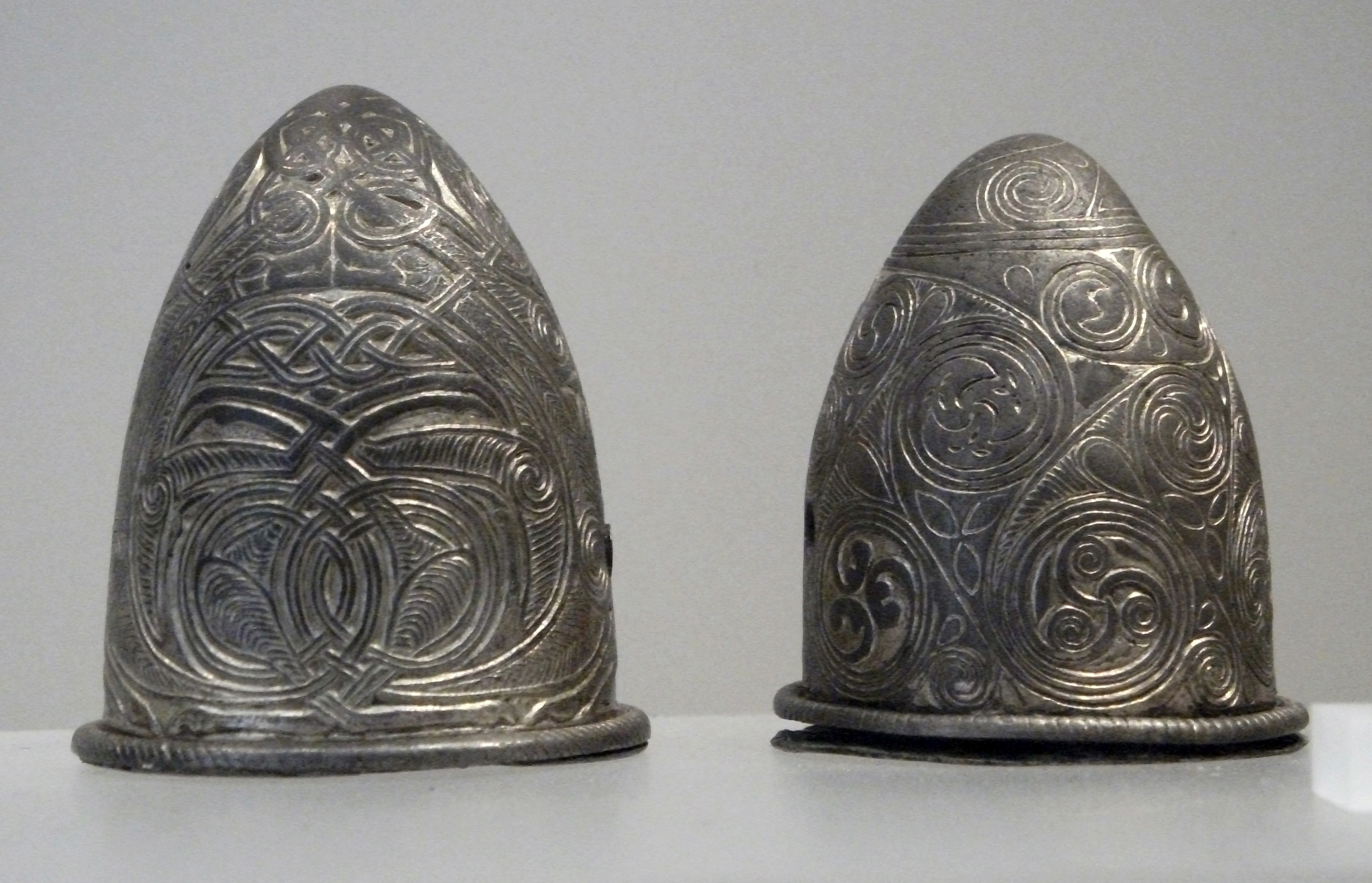
Mounts

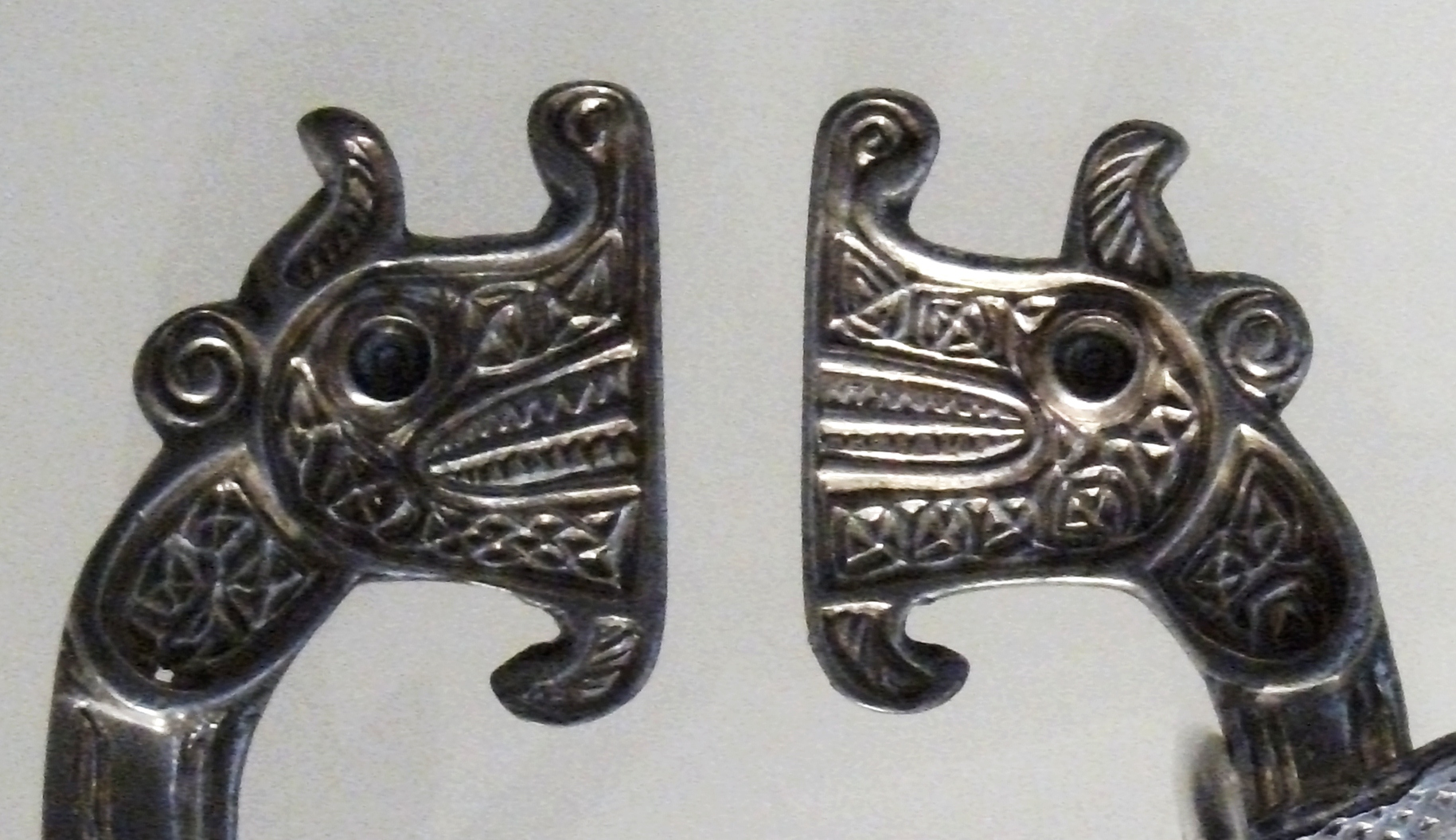
Terminals of a brooch

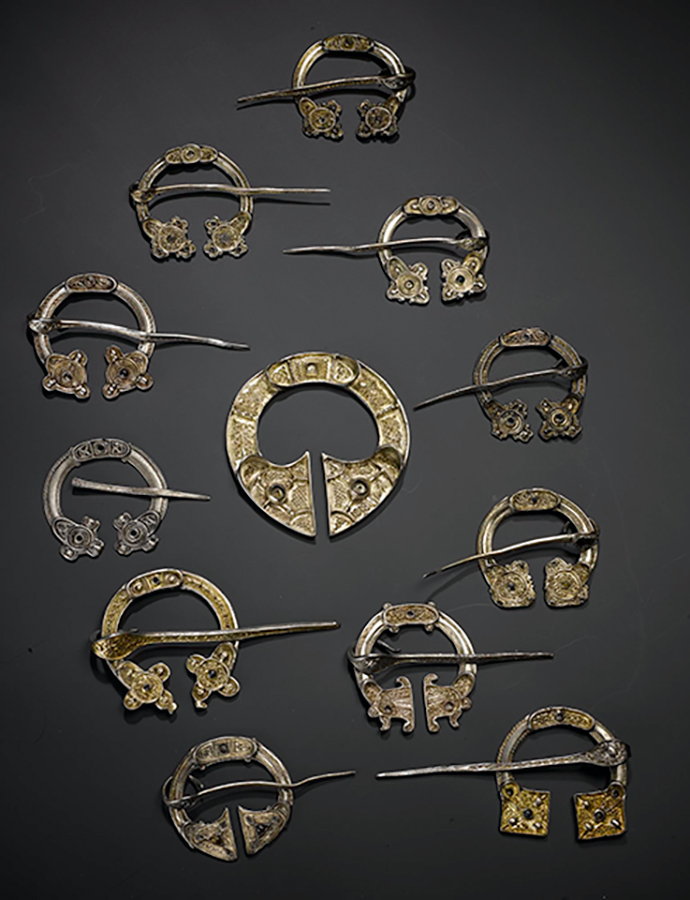
Penannular silver brooches

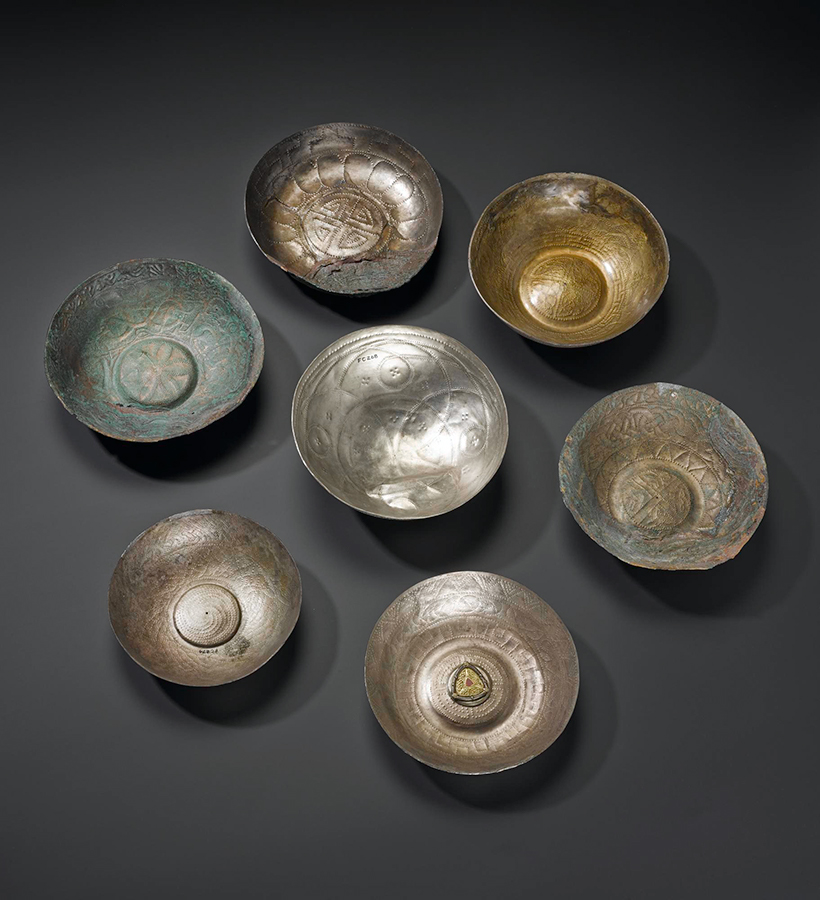
Penannular silver bowls

== See also ==
- List of islands of Scotland
