= Clumlie Broch =

Iron Age broch on Mainland, Shetland, Scotland

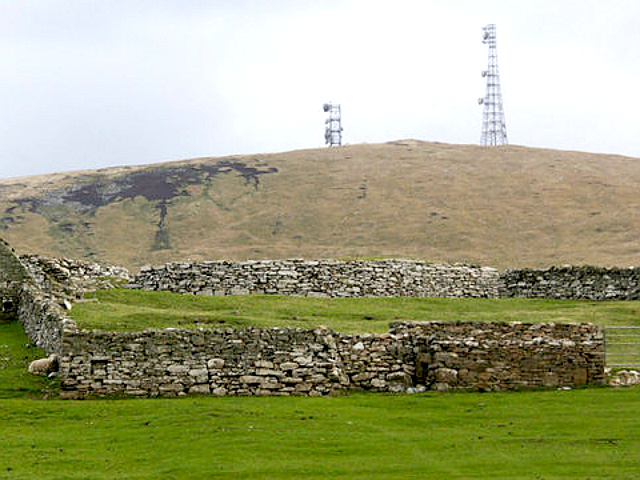
- Clumlie Broch, behind a field wall

- Location within Shetland
- 59°56′46″N 1°16′40″W
- Type: Broch
- Periods: Iron Age
- Location: Mainland, Shetland

Clumlie Broch is an Iron Age broch located on Mainland, Shetland, in Scotland (grid reference HU40451811).

== Location ==
Clumlie Broch is located in Dunrossness, on the southern part of Mainland, Shetland about 8 kilometres north of Sumburgh Airport. It stands on a low rise on flat arable ground. The broch is at the centre of an abandoned croft, which encroaches upon the ruins.

== Description ==
The broch has an external diameter of 21 metres and an internal diameter of about 8 metres. Much of the western side of the site is hidden by a stone dyke, but the entrance passage and a guard cell are visible. The walls currently stand around 2 metres high.

== Excavations ==
Clumlie Broch was partially excavated by Gilbert Goudie in 1887, who also restored part of the walling. Goudie discovered a stone cist 75 centimetres above the floor of the broch and concluded that the broch had been used for burials after it had fallen into disuse. Finds included stone implements, quern stones, whetstones, spindle whorls, and hammer stones. There were also many pottery fragments and animal bones, shells, as well as a fragment of a painted Roman bowl.
