= Pool of Virkie =

Inlet in the Shetland Islands, Scotland

Coordinates: 59°53′4″N 1°17′40″W

The Pool of Virkie is a tidal lagoon in the parish of Dunrossness, south Mainland, Shetland.

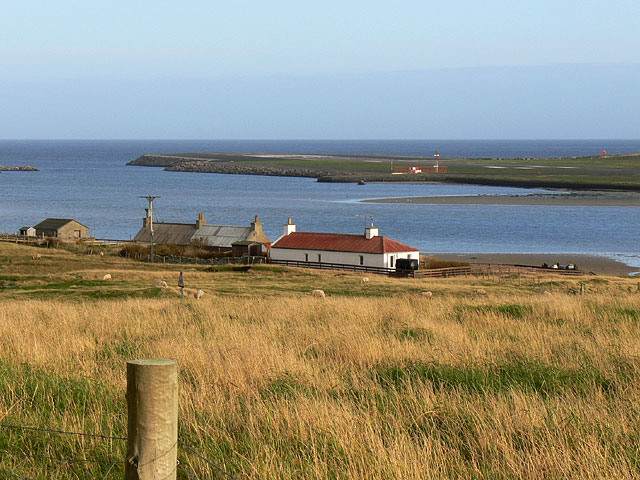
Pool of Virkie

== History ==
The Pool of Virkie, during the late 15th and early 16th centuries, when it was much deeper than it is today, became the main Hanseatic trading centre for the south end of Shetland. Because of this trade it became known as the Dutch Pool. This name was chosen because locals pronounced Deutsch as Dutch. The actual Dutch visitors were called Hollanders. Flint stones are to be found around the shores of the Pool and as flint does not occur naturally in Shetland, it is assumed these are discarded ballast stones from the continental boats.

At the end of the 16th century the Pool silted up and became much as it is today, with the only anchorage available towards the east end or in the Virkie Marina, which was formed in the 1980s.

== Wildlife ==
Because of the large area exposed by the ebb tide, the Pool of Virkie has become an important site for bird watching in the South Mainland. It adjoins Sumburgh Airport

== Sources ==
- Irvine, James W. (2001). The Dunrossness Story. Lerwick, Shetland, U.K.: A. Irvine Printing. ISBN 0-9522638-9-0.
