= Old Scatness =

Archaeological site in Shetland, Scotland

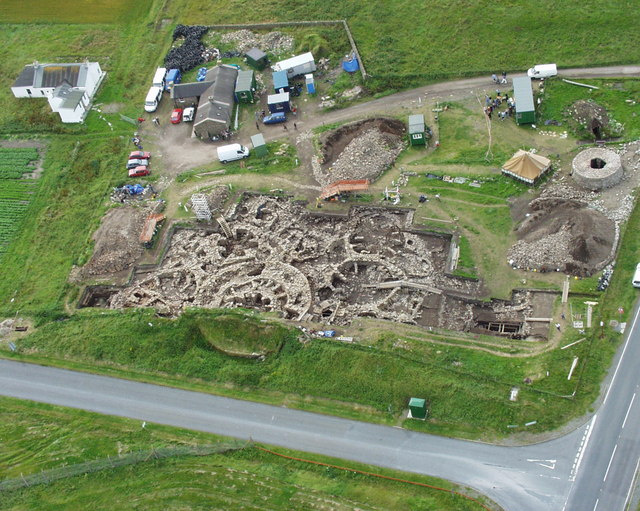
- Aerial view of the archaeological dig

- Location within Shetland
- 59.879°N 1.3054°W
- Type: Broch and settlement
- Periods: Iron Age, Pictish, Viking
- Location: Mainland, Shetland

Old Scatness is an archaeological site on Scat Ness, near the village of Scatness, in the parish of Dunrossness in the south end of Mainland, Shetland, Scotland, near Sumburgh Airport. It consists of medieval, Viking, Pictish, and Iron Age remains and has been a settlement for thousands of years, each new generation adding buildings, and levelling off old ones. Among the discoveries is an Iron Age broch, the Ness of Burgi fort.

== Discovery and excavation ==
The site was first identified during improvements to nearby Sumburgh Airport in the late 1970s, when construction of the airport perimeter road exposed part of the broch wall in a grassy mound. The structure that emerged had likely been built more than 2,000 years earlier during the Iron Age.

Archaeological excavations began in 1995, led by the University of Bradford and supported by professional archaeologists, students and local volunteers. Excavations have uncovered a multi-period settlement with broch, wheelhouses and later dwellings. Gradually, the team has been revealing the full extent of the multi period settlement and cataloguing the finds.

The site is managed by the Shetland Amenity Trust. In the summer, costumed guides provide tours of the site and the replica Iron Age and Pictish buildings. The visitor centre also includes exhibits, and there are demonstrations of ancient crafts.

== The broch ==
The broch still stands several metres high with a battered outer wall face. It stands at the centre of the settlement and seems to have at least three major phases of use. The first phase saw the building of the primary tower. The second phase saw a rebuilding of the broch interior which involved the addition of a secondary skin to the south and east part of the inner broch wall, and a set of radial piers to form a new interior structure. In the third phase another building was constructed inside the broch, consisting of six or more curvilinear cells clustered around a central area, with a corridor leading out towards the broch wall to the east.

== Structures west of the broch ==
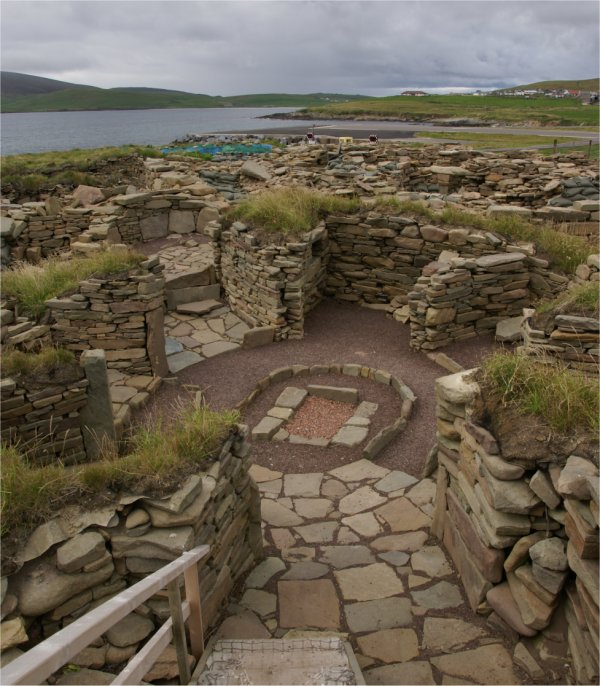
Old Scatness wheelhouse

To the western (seaward) side of the broch the limits of the settlement have been established. The dominant feature was a large circular aisled roundhouse (Structure 12) around 10 metres in diameter. The walls of this building stand over 2 metres high in places. West of this was a second building, which is less well preserved. South of Structure 12 was another roundhouse (Structure 14) of a similar size but oval in shape. North of Structure 12 was another range of buildings, including one with a set of seven (possibly originally eight or more) small 'cupboards' let into the interior wall. East of this building and closer to the broch, a circular inward-tilting arrangement of stones appeared to be the partially collapsed roof of a corbelled cell.

== Structures east of the broch ==
A slightly later roundhouse (Structure 21), east of the broch, had the greatest diameter of any of the buildings on site: approximately 12 metres internally. It seems originally to have had short piers, later rebuilt as long thin ones. There was also a later wheelhouse to the southeast of the broch (Structure 11). A multi-cellular semi-subterranean building (Structure 5) was inserted into the fill of Structure 21, and is considered to be characteristic of 'Pictish' architecture.

== Later use ==
After the end of its Iron Age occupation, the remains at Old Scatness did not disappear from the landscape. The stone walls and grassy mounds remained visible for centuries, and later communities reused parts of the settlement. Archaeologists have recovered Viking Age artefacts from several of the earlier buildings, showing that Norse settlers reused structures from the older Iron Age settlement.

Old Scatness lies at the southern tip of Mainland, Shetland, close to the multi period settlement at Jarlshof and the Iron Age promontory fort at Ness of Burgi. For later inhabitants of the area, the broch mound and surrounding stone ruins remained visible features in the landscape.

By the early modern period the ruins had become part of the agricultural landscape. Excavations have revealed the remains of a 17th-century barn and corn drier built among the earlier structures. Prehistoric stone buildings in the Northern Isles were often reused in this way, with later farmers incorporating existing walls and stonework into agricultural buildings.

By the mid 19th century, a crofthouse had been built on the north side of the site. The broch mound and surrounding ruins continued to influence patterns of settlement and land use in the area even after their original purpose had passed from local memory.
