= Scousburgh =

Coordinates: 59.944°N 1.324°W

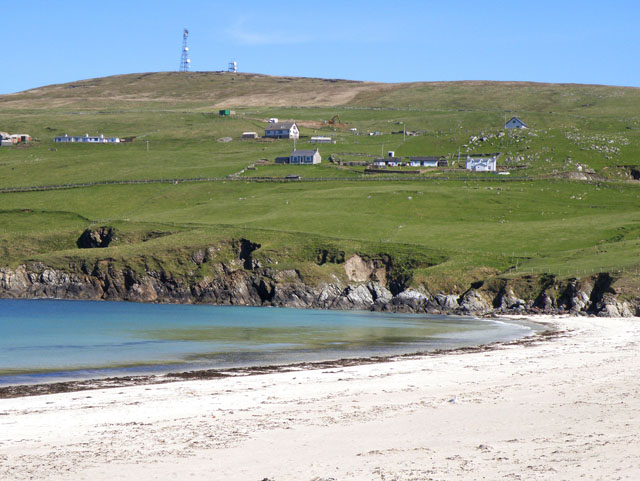
- The beach at Scousburgh. In the distance the Ward of Scousburgh rises to 263m.

- Location within Shetland
- OS grid reference: HU377178
- Civil parish: Dunrossness
- Council area: Shetland
- Lieutenancy area: Shetland
- Country: Scotland
- Sovereign state: United Kingdom
- Post town: SHETLAND
- Postcode district: ZE2
- Dialling code: 01950
- Police: Scotland
- Fire: Scottish
- Ambulance: Scottish
- UK Parliament: Orkney and Shetland
- Scottish Parliament: Shetland

Scousburgh is a small community in the parish of Dunrossness, in the South Mainland of Shetland, Scotland, overlooking the picturesque Scousburgh Sand, and Spiggie Loch. From Scousburgh a road leads up the hill to the site of the former Mossy Hill army base. This road has a connection to Scousburgh Hill the site of the now redundant trans horizon transmission dishes. From there another road leads down to the A970 on the east side of the Hill.

There is a broch (Iron Age fort) just North of Scousburgh, behind Rhu-allen, Bremire Crofthouse (traditional Shetland farm) South of Scousburgh and eleven horizontal 19th century cereal water mills alongside the Burn of Scousburgh that have been designated as scheduled monuments by Historic Environment Scotland.
