= Elizabeth Balneaves =

Scottish author, painter and filmmaker (1911–2006)

- Born: 24 August 1911; Aberdeen, Scotland
- Died: 7 November 2006 (aged 95); Elgin, Moray, Scotland
- Occupations: Writer, painter, filmmaker
- Spouse: James McLauchlan Johnston (m. 1934)

Elizabeth Balneaves (24 September 1911 – 7 November 2006) was a Scottish author, painter and filmmaker.

== Early life ==
Elizabeth Balneaves was born in Aberdeen, the only child of Annie and Alexander Balneaves. She graduated from Gray's School of Art in Aberdeen and married Shetlander psychiatrist Dr James McLauchlan Johnston in 1934. Although they were separated for several years, James supported her in her work throughout their married life.

== Career ==
Balneaves wrote six books, made numerous documentary films, drew many portraits in pastel and charcoal and painted many landscapes, latterly mainly of Shetland and Cullen. In the former, which she first visited with her husband in 1934, she is perhaps best known for The Windswept Isles (1977), which she wrote during the estimated 20 years she and James lived in retirement in an old manse in Bigton. This was her tribute to the people and the islands whom she always felt had adopted her.

During those years, Balneaves also made a documentary film of Shetland for the BBC: People of Many Lands - Shetland. Although painting was her first love, it was her writing that brought her to a wider public attention, one of the first signs of her literary talent being a poem published in 1945 in Poetry Scotland (2nd collection), a series of Scottish poetry books published by William MacLellan & Co.

In the early 1950s Elizabeth travelled alone to Pakistan, particularly to Karachi and the border with Afghanistan, where she stayed for several years, resulting in The Waterless Moon (1955) and Peacocks and Pipelines (1958), both of which received some critical acclaim. Later, she returned to the area with her son, Stewart, resulting in a third book on the area between the Hindu Khush and the Karakoram, The Mountains of the Murgha Zerin (1972) and some unique film footage of this remote area and its culture.

At a later date, they returned to the Sundarbans (then in East Pakistan), this time concentrating on documentary filmmaking. In 1959, between her second and third books, Betty visited the area being flooded (in then Southern Rhodesia) by the new Kariba Dam where Stewart was working. Here she made a documentary film of the effects of the flooding on wildlife - Logging in the Sundarbans, East Pakistan - and wrote the story of a colourful Scottish Game and Tsetse Supervisor called Joe McGregor Brooks entitled Elephant Valley (1962). Just prior to this trip Elizabeth worked as a publicity officer for the Edinburgh Zoo and, as with everything she did, she made use of this experience in her only work of fiction, Murder in the Zoo (1974).

== Later life and death ==
In February 2002, The Scotsman newspaper ran a story on Elizabeth and two peers who shared her occupations: Isobel Wylie Hutchison and Jenny Gilbertson. The article was titled: Action Woman.

Becoming computer literate on her 90th birthday, she spent her last five years putting together the text for her final publication, her memoirs, which she never finished. Elizabeth died in Elgin, survived by her four children, thirteen grandchildren and eleven great-grandchildren.

== Sources ==
- "Scotsman" obituary
- Scottish Screen Archive
