= Sumburgh Head Lighthouse =

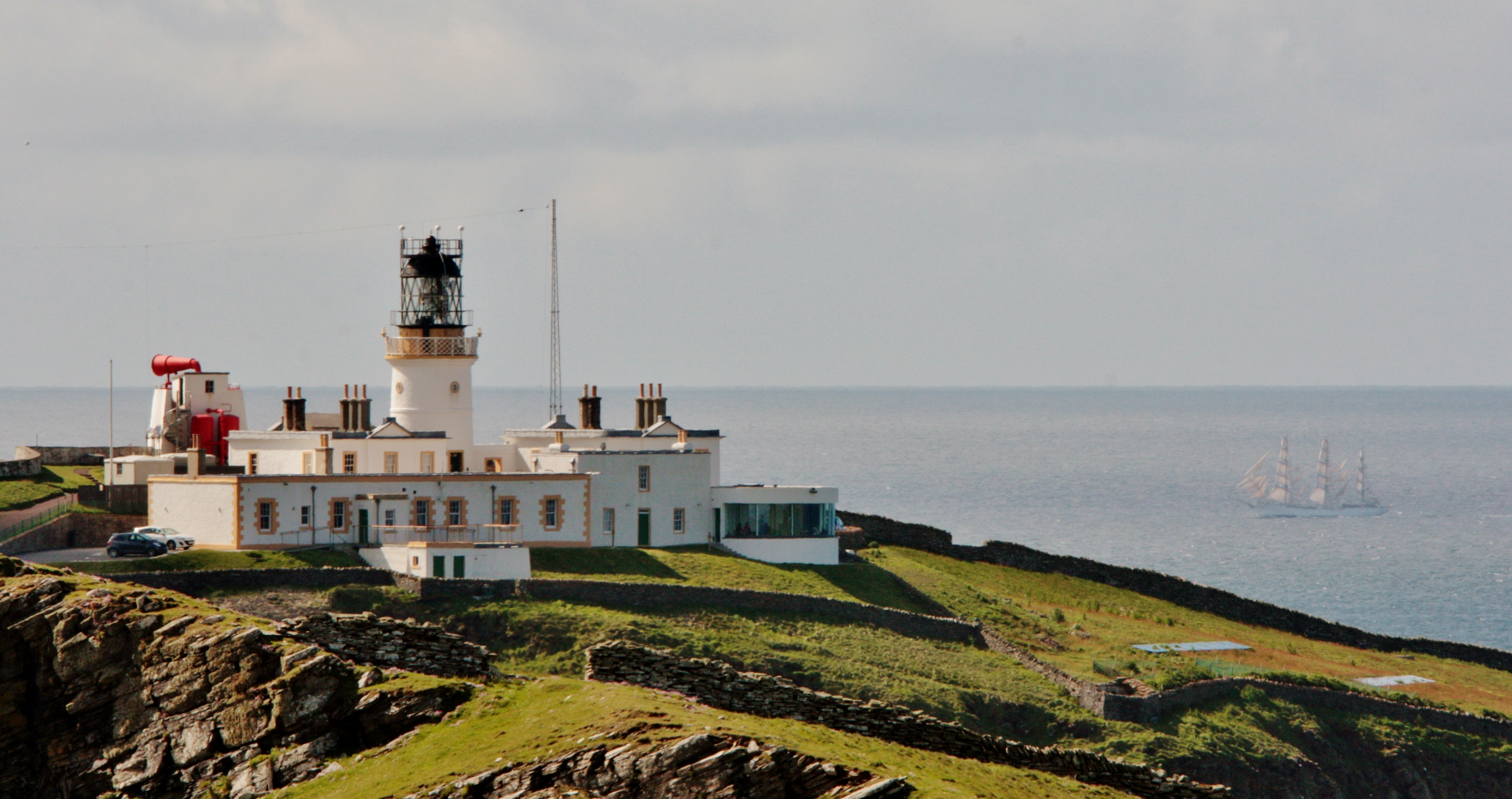
- Location: Sumburgh Head; Shetland; Scotland
- OS grid: HU4072307872
- Coordinates: 59.854053°N 1.274585°W

Tower
- Constructed: 1821
- Built by: Robert Stevenson
- Construction: Masonry tower
- Automated: 1991
- Height: 17 metres (56 ft)
- Shape: Cylindrical tower with balcony and lantern
- Markings: White tower, black lantern, ochre trim
- Operator: Sumburgh Head Lighthouse
- Heritage: category A listed building
- Fog signal: Type Siren, 1 blast every 90s Operational from 1906–1987 Restored in 2014

Light
- Focal height: 91 metres (299 ft)
- Range: 23 nautical miles (43 km; 26 mi)
- Characteristic: Fl (3) W 30s.

Sumburgh Head Lighthouse is a lighthouse on Sumburgh Head at the southern tip of the Mainland of Shetland.

== History ==
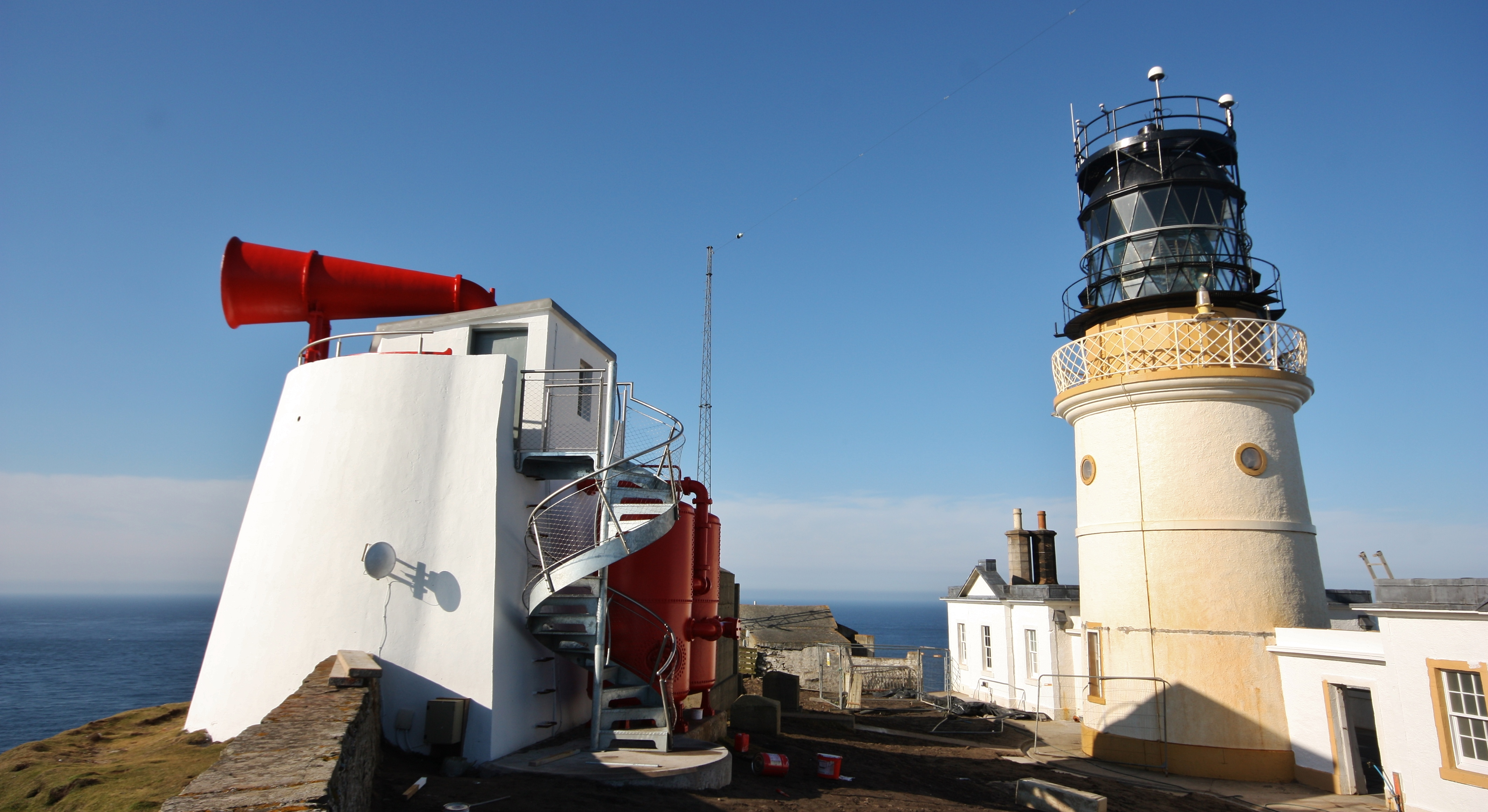
Foghorn and lighthouse

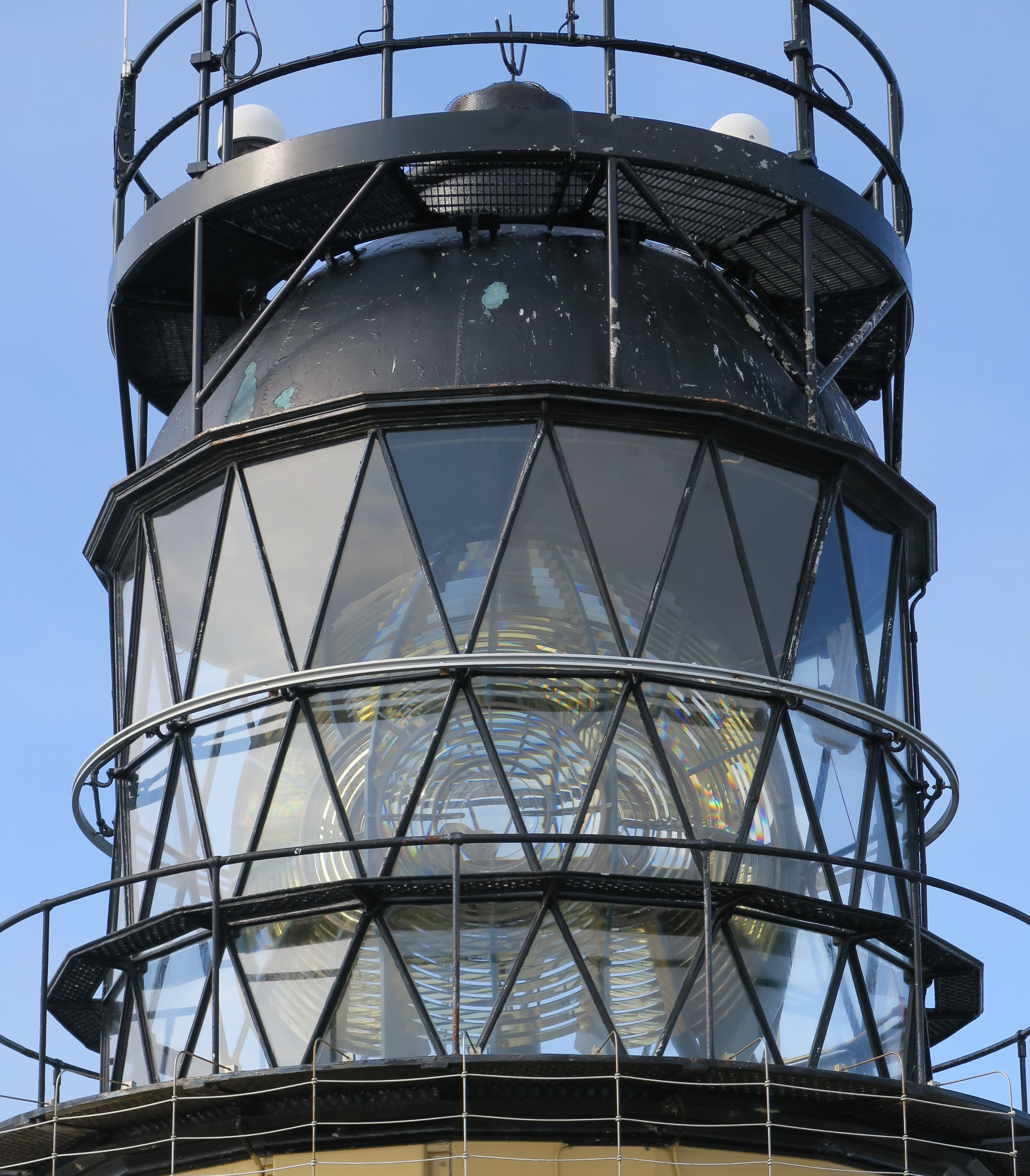
Diamond lattice window of the cylindrical lantern

The lighthouse was built by Robert Stevenson in 1821 and is the oldest lighthouse in Shetland. From 1906 to 1987, there was also an active foghorn, which was originally traversable in azimuth. This replaced the fog bell, which had been presented after the loss of the Royal Victoria in 1864. The bell now hangs in the parish church at Dunrossness.

The Northern Lighthouse Board operate the light, which was automated in 1991, whilst the Shetland Amenity Trust own and operate the surrounding property.

In 2002, the Trust took ownership of the former keepers' cottages, which were then converted into holiday accommodation. In 2014, the Trust opened a visitor centre on the site and restored the lighthouse facilities as well as the foghorn, which is sounded occasionally. Both the lighthouse and the foghorn are protected as Category A listed buildings. The lighthouse complex also has offices for the RSPB who look after the bird reserve which surrounds the lighthouse.

== See also ==
- List of lighthouses in Scotland
- List of Northern Lighthouse Board lighthouses
- List of Category A listed buildings in Shetland
