= Scatness =

Coordinates: 59.874°N 1.306°W

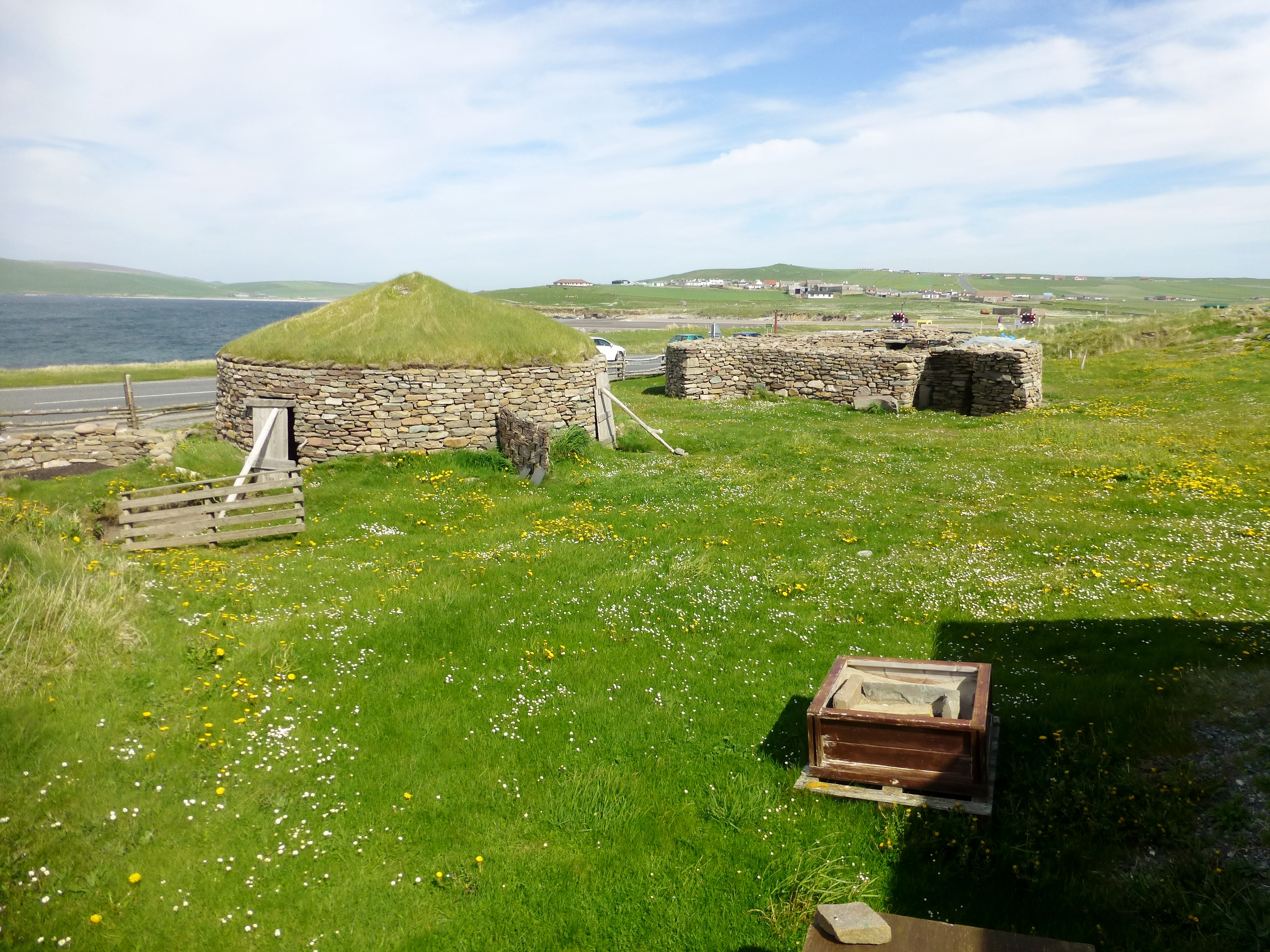
- Part of the Old Scatness Broch site

- Location within Shetland
- OS grid reference: HU388100
- Civil parish: Dunrossness
- Council area: Shetland
- Lieutenancy area: Shetland
- Country: Scotland
- Sovereign state: United Kingdom
- Post town: SHETLAND
- Postcode district: ZE3
- Dialling code: 01950
- Police: Scotland
- Fire: Scottish
- Ambulance: Scottish
- UK Parliament: Orkney and Shetland
- Scottish Parliament: Shetland

Scatness is a settlement on the headland of Scat Ness at the southern tip of Mainland, Shetland, Scotland, across the West Voe of Sumburgh from Sumburgh Head and close to Sumburgh Airport, the Shetland Islands' main airport. Scatness is in the parish of Dunrossness.

Scatness includes the housing estates of Sanblister Place and Colonial Place. On the east side of Scat Ness are the beaches of Outer and Inner Tumble Wick, which were fishing stations.

At the south easternmost point of Scatness, off the A970 road, lies the Ness of Burgi fort, an Iron Age blockhouse probably from the same era as Shetland's brochs. The site is in the care of Historic Scotland.

Also part of Scatness are the broch, wheelhouse and post-Iron Age settlements excavated in the early 21st century.
