= Sumburgh Head =

Headland in Scotland

Sumburgh Head Dunrøstar høfdi (Nynorsk)
- Headland
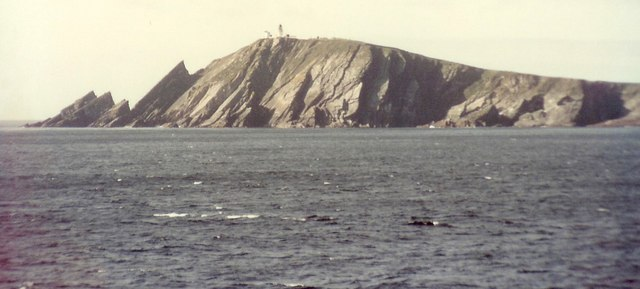
- Sumburgh Head

- Location within Scotland
- Coordinates: 59°51′15″N 01°16′31″W
- Grid position: HU 40699 07900
- Location: Shetland Archipelago, Scotland

Sumburgh Head is a headland located at the southern tip of the main island of the Shetland Archipelago, in northern Scotland. The head consists of a 100 m high rocky spur and topped by the Sumburgh Head Lighthouse. In the Old Norse language, Sumburgh Head was called Dunrøstar høfdi, it means "The Head onto the loud tide-race", referring to the noise of Sumburgh Roost. Robert Stevenson was the engineer in charge of building the Sumburgh Head lighthouse. Work started on the building in 1819, and the light was first lit in 1821.

== Local ecology ==
The area is now recognized as a nature reserve by the Royal Society for the Protection of Birds. It is a popular viewing point for whales and dolphins. The cliffs are home to large numbers of seabirds with 33,000 puffins being estimated in the year 2000. These numbers have declined sharply: for example only 570 of the birds were counted in 2017. The decline in Puffin numbers also appears to apply to other species native to Sumburgh Head. The headland has been designated an Important Bird Area (IBA) by BirdLife International because it supports large colonies of breeding seabirds.

Sumburgh Head, surrounding coastal areas, and nearby outcrops off the coast of Mainland Shetland have been designated a Site of Special Scientific Interest (SSSI) by NatureScot because of the importance of the area for breeding seabirds mentioned above. The marine boundary of Sumburgh Head SSSI and its extension for approximately 2 km into the surrounding sea is designated a Special Protection Area (SPA) by NatureScot to recognise the importance of access to the sea for seabirds, and the beaches on the coast.

== Nearby locations ==
- Sumburgh Airport, which takes its name from the head, lies immediately to the north, and serves as the main airport for the Shetland Islands. Flights from here connect to mainland Scotland, the Orkney Islands and Norway.
- The archaeological site of Jarlshof, at which a series of settlements existed dating back to the Neolithic period.
- The tiny settlement of Grutness, which is the terminus of the Shetland Mainland to Fair Isle ferry service, lies one mile (1.5 kilometres) north of Sumburgh Head.
- Sumburgh Head Lighthouse

== Gallery ==
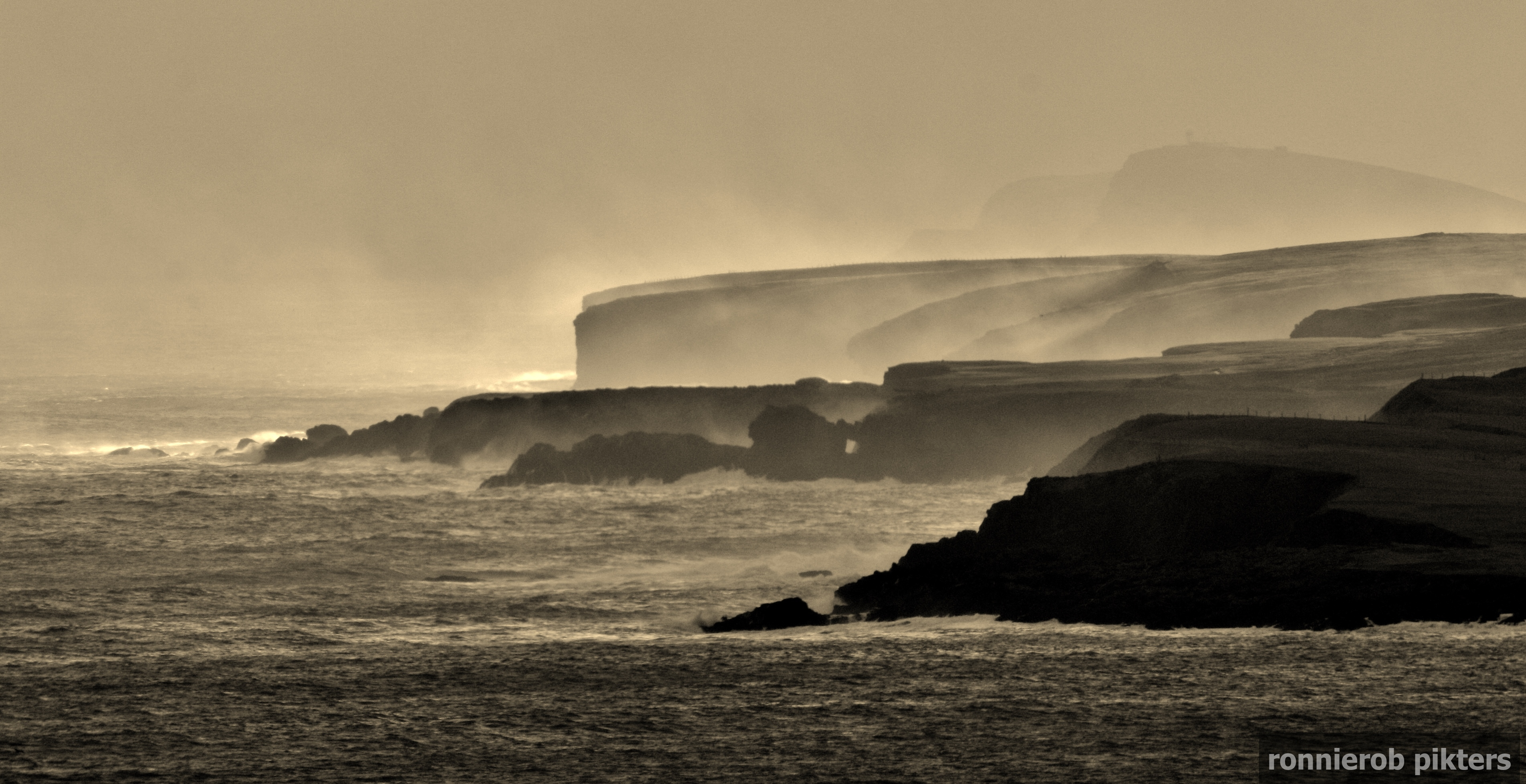
After the Storm 1

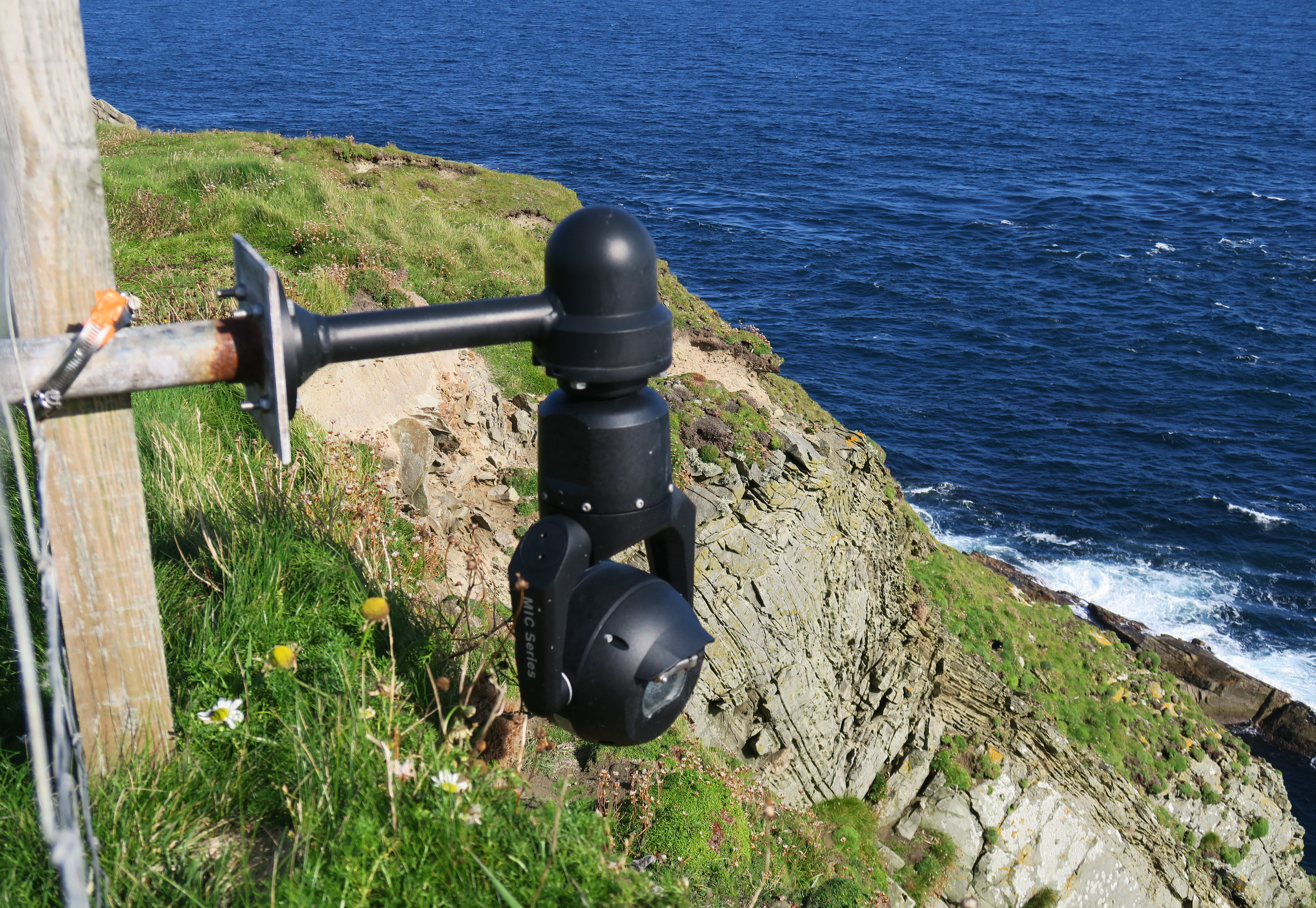
A webcam installed near Sumburgh Head lighthouse. The cliffs used to be home to large numbers of seabirds. The area is an RSPB nature reserve.

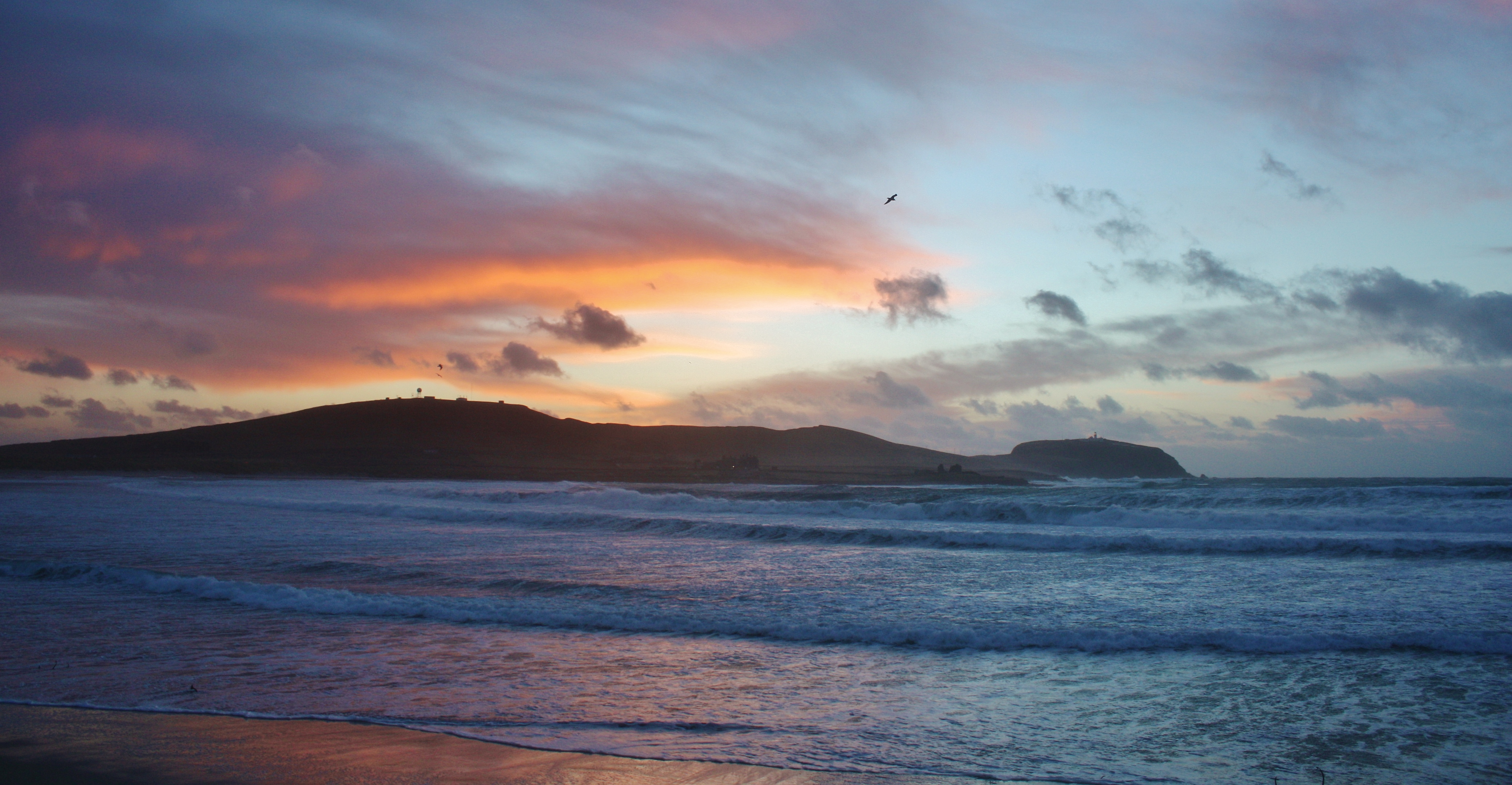
Beachhead Sunrise

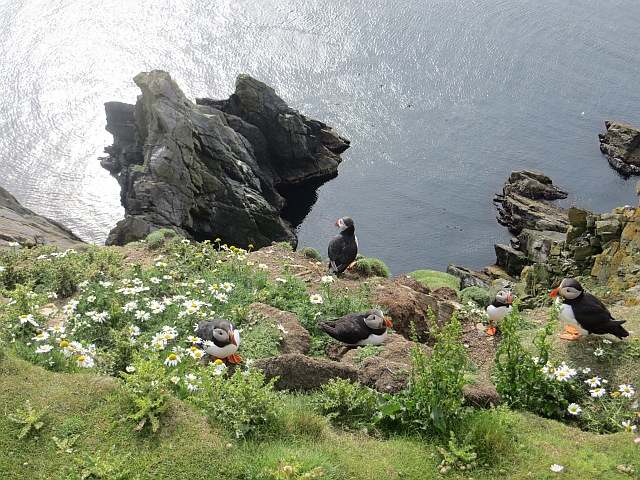
Banks, Sumburgh Head

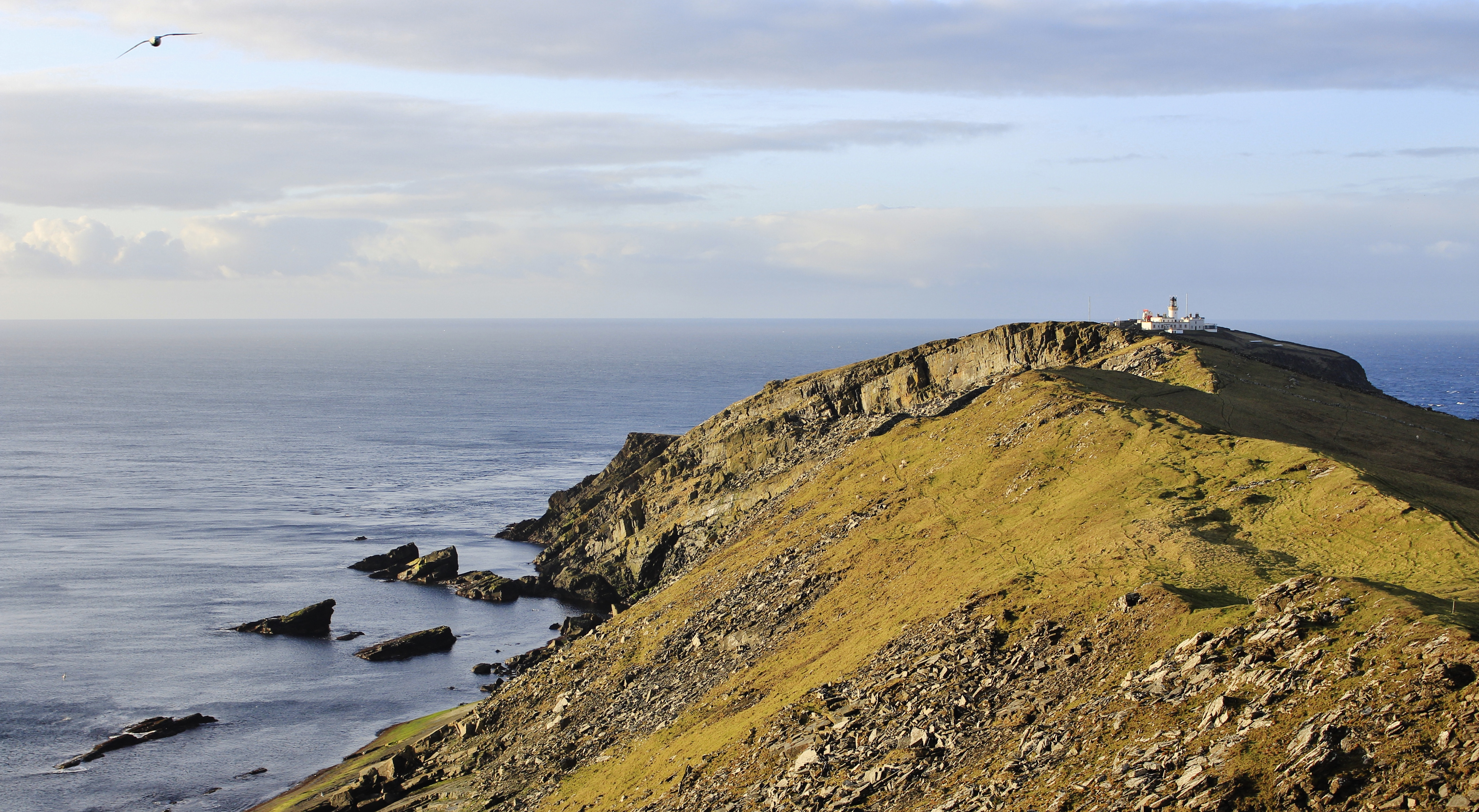
Bird on the Wing

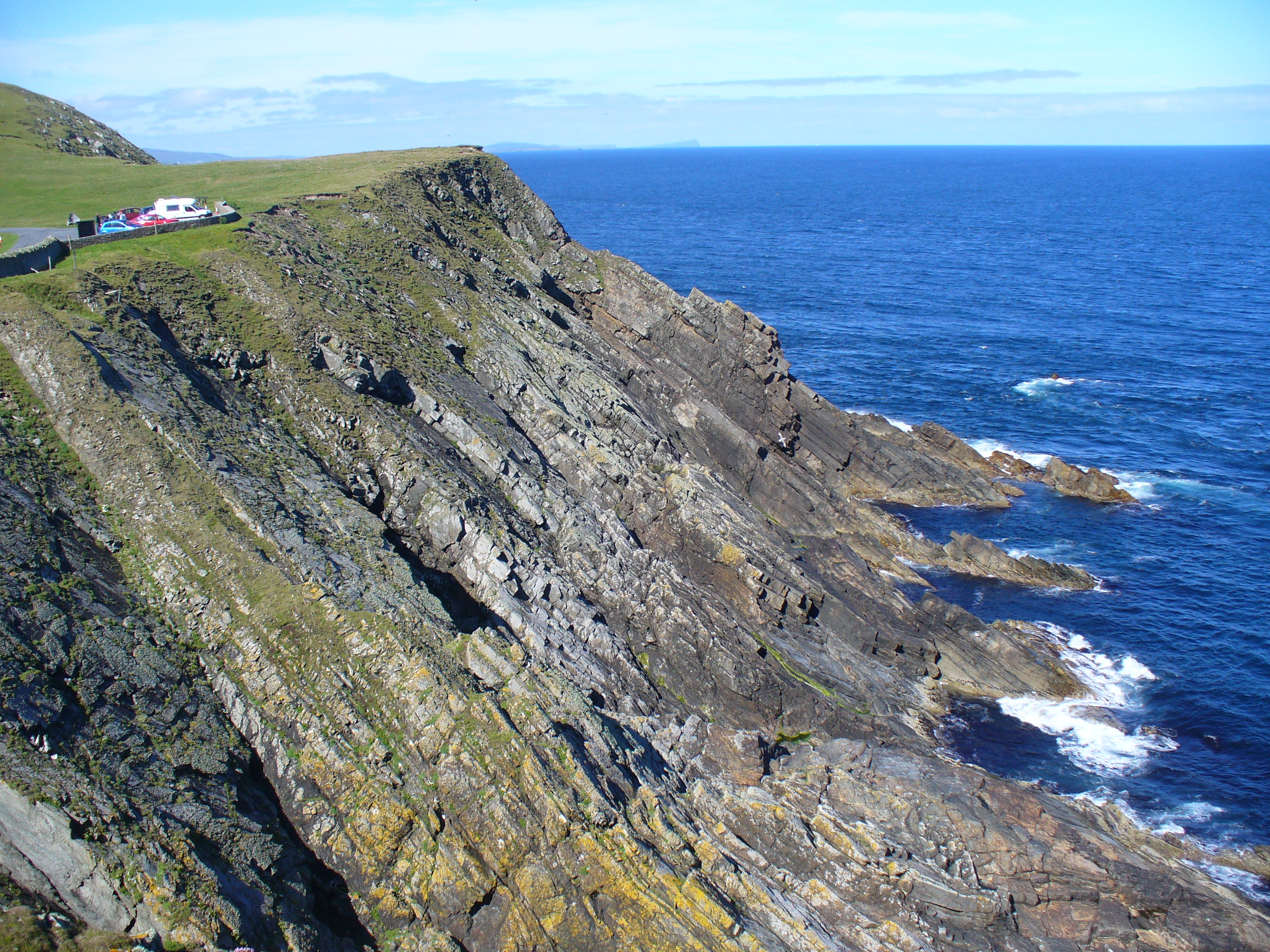
East Coast of Sumburgh Head

== See also ==
- Sumburgh Head Lighthouse
- Northern Lighthouse Board
- Shetland Islands
- Royal Society for the Protection of Birds
- Sumburgh Airport
