= Assater =

Coordinates: 60.499311°N 1.460247°W

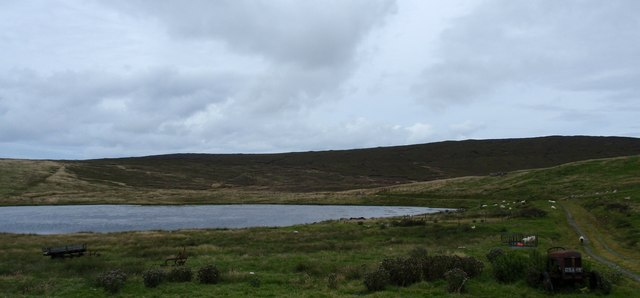
- Loch of Assater

- Location within Shetland
- OS grid reference: HU295795
- Civil parish: Northmaven
- Council area: Shetland
- Lieutenancy area: Shetland
- Country: Scotland
- Sovereign state: United Kingdom
- Post town: SHETLAND
- Postcode district: ZE2
- Dialling code: 01806
- Police: Scotland
- Fire: Scottish
- Ambulance: Scottish
- UK Parliament: Orkney and Shetland
- Scottish Parliament: Shetland

Assater, also spelled Assetter (Shaetlan pronunciation: [ˈaːstər] AH-stər) is a hamlet on Mainland, in Shetland, Scotland. Assater is situated in the parish of Northmaven. It is about 1.3 miles (2.1 km) northwest of Urafirth and 1.2 miles (1.9 km) southeast of Heylor by road.

== History ==
=== Robert Dunn ===
In 1831, ornithologist Robert Dunn visited Shetland to acquire specimens for his collection, and in 1837 published the notes from his trip "for the purpose of furnishing a guide to those who might be desirous of visiting these islands to collect specimens of Natural History". He spent a considerable portion of his stay living in Assater, exploring Ronas Voe and Ronas Hill multiple times.

Dunn first arrived in Urafirth after travelling by boat from Voe with a servant he hired in Lerwick, and then travelled by foot to Assater. He noted that the alarm raised subsequently by the dogs, pigs and children that greeted him upon arrival were daunting. At that time there were three families who lived in Assater, and their occupations were all recorded by Dunn as fishermen, however they did tend their croft during the winter months.

The breakfast he received on his first morning there is recorded in some detail: it consisted of fresh fish, eggs, cold fowl and coffee with cream. He did however note that "the table was certainly not overloaded with delicacies." Dunn also noted that he thought his servant was rude to him when it was suggested they leave for a trip to Ronas Hill before the servant had finished his "second edition" of the breakfast. Dunn deescalated the altercation with the supply of a glass of spirits, as he did on various occasions during his visit to Shetland.

Dunn's general impression of Assater seemed quite positive - he commented that "if the place itself possesses any virtue, in time it might become the Brighton of Shetland"

=== Buildings ===
On the first edition of the Ordnance Survey map of the area in 1881, Assater is shown to have had fourteen roofed buildings (of which two were mills), and six unroofed buildings, of which one was L-shaped. By 1973 the latest Ordnance Survey map showed only nine roofed buildings and eight unroofed.

A burnt mound 0.7 metres (2.3 ft) tall is visible to the 200 yards (180 m) south of the main settlement. Also, what is recorded as a clearance cairn 15 metres (49 ft) is situated nearby. This cairn has been claimed instead to be the site of a derelict chapel.

== Fauna ==
In 1999, although frogs are more widespread on the island, Assater was one of only four locations in North Mainland where frogs were found to be breeding, frogs not being native to Shetland. The other locations recorded in Northmavine were near the Hillswick junction; near the Ollaberry School; and in Nisetter, Gluss.

== See also ==
- Ronas Voe
- Heylor

== Sources ==
- Dunn, Robert (1831). The ornithologist's guide to the islands of Orkney and Shetland (2 ed.). Hull: Robert Dunn (published 1837). OCLC 1050252106. OL 17084227M – via archive.org.
- Riddington, Roger (1999). "Frogs in Shetland: a century of colonisation". Nature in Shetland. Shetland Biological Records Centre. Archived from the original on 24 March 2011.
- Williamson, Rachel Anne (2006). "The Area's". www.heard.shetland.co.uk.
- "Assater to Shetland". Google Maps.
- "Burnt Mound (Prehistoric)". canmore.org.uk.
- "Clearance Cairn (Period Unassigned)". canmore.org.uk.
- "North Roe, Assater | Canmore". canmore.org.uk.
- "Parish of Northmaven". Scottish Places.
