= Voe, Northmavine =

Coordinates: 60.513°N 1.393°W

Voe
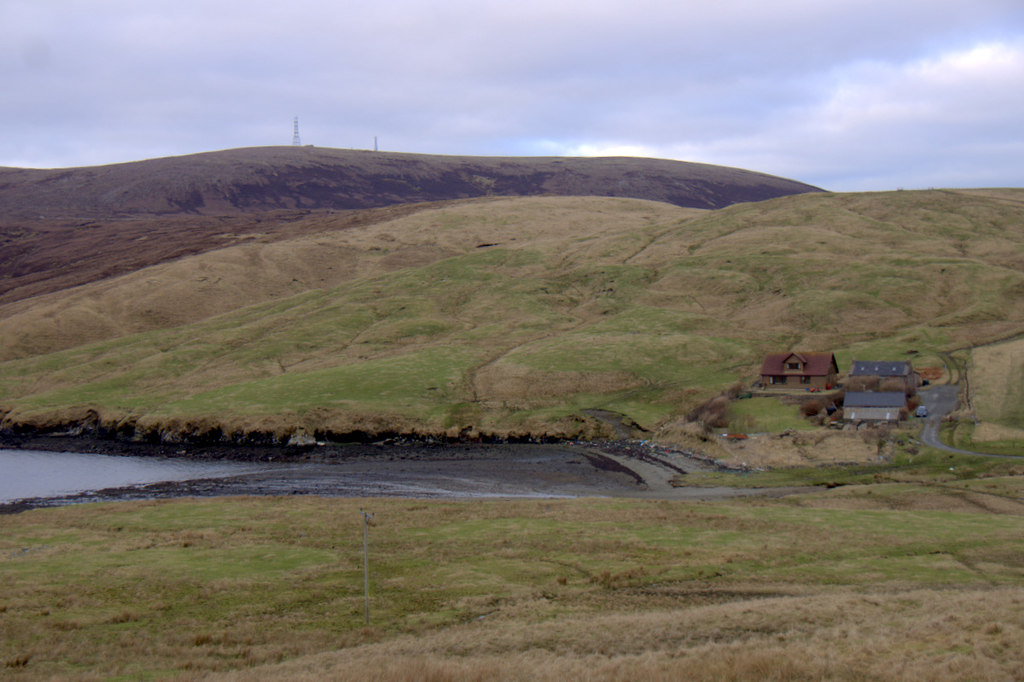
- Voe at the head of Ronas Voe, Northmavine

- Location within Shetland
- OS grid reference: HU333811
- Civil parish: Northmaven
- Council area: Shetland
- Lieutenancy area: Shetland
- Country: Scotland
- Sovereign state: United Kingdom
- Post town: SHETLAND
- Postcode district: ZE2
- Dialling code: 01806
- Police: Scotland
- Fire: Scottish
- Ambulance: Scottish
- UK Parliament: Orkney and Shetland
- Scottish Parliament: Shetland

Voe Shaetlan pronunciation: [vo] VOH is a settlement on the Northmavine peninsula of Mainland, Shetland, Scotland. It is at the head of Ronas Voe and just off the A970 road.

== Whaling ==
Two Norwegian whaling stations were constructed in Voe at the beginning of the 20th century - the Zetland Whale Fishing Company, set up by Christian Nielsen; and the Norrona Whale Fishing Company, set up by Peder Bogen - opened in April and June 1903 respectively, being the first whaling stations based in UK territory.

Whales caught by harpoon were dragged in by steamers. They were hauled up a wooden slip with a steam winch to take them ashore. They would then be cut up using blades on long handles called flensing knives. Species caught included fin whales, sperm whales, bowhead whales and bottlenose whales. In 1903 the Norrona station had around six boilers, of which some were up to 12 feet (3.7 m) tall.

While some work was made available for the locals, there was push-back against the factories due to the smell of the operations and pollution left upon the nearby beaches. Those engaged in the herring fishing also believed that the waste products of processing the whales (some of which ended up in the sea) attracted sharks that frightened off the herring shoals. A committee to investigate these claims was set up in 1904, however it wasn't able to determine a connection between the whaling and a downturn in the herring catch. The stations operated until 1914. There is very little left of the whaling stations - as of 2019 only a few low walls remain to be seen.

=== Economics ===
Station	Economic Activity		1903	...	1908	1909	1910	1911	1912	1913	1914	Source
Zetland	Whales landed		61		81	71	53	25	20	50	65	
Zetland	Products value	Total (Note: Including whale oil, manure, baleen, and in the case of Norrona, meat meal and bone meal)			£7,768						£6,264	
Zetland	Products value	of which oil			£5,380						£4,940	
Norrona	Whales landed		63		52	60	65	36	16	59	67	
Norrona	Products value	Total			£3,251						£4,285	
Norrona	Products value	of which oil			£2,256						£3,200	

== Sources ==
- Gray, Alan (15 July 2014). Bevington, Pete (ed.). "Whaling station research". Shetland News.
- Gustafsson, Ulf Ingemar (2019). Icebound frontiers of exploitation: Networks for whaling in the Polar regions, 1904-1931 (PDF) (PhD thesis). University of Groningen. p. 109. hdl:11370/6715a46a-a130-4e6b-9e34-8b9038c9a062. ISBN 978-94-034-1527-7.
- Haldane, R. C. (1904). Harvie-Brown, J. A.; Trail, James W. H.; Clarke, William Eagle (eds.). "Whaling in Shetland". The Annals of Scottish Natural History. 50. David Douglas: 74–77. OCLC 805938354 – via archive.org.
- Johnson, Laureen (2015). Shetland's whaling tradition from Willafjord to Enderby Land. Smith, James C., Shetland ex-Whalers Association. Lerwick: The Shetland Times Ltd. pp. 12–20. ISBN 9780955778421. OCLC 941068842.
- Murton, Paul (10 October 2019). The Viking Isles: Travels in Orkney and Shetland. Birlinn. p. 113. ISBN 978-1-78885-228-9.
- Tønnessen, Johan Nicolay; Johnsen, Arne Odd (1 January 1982). The History of Modern Whaling. Translated by Christophersen, R. I. University of California Press. pp. 88–89. ISBN 9780520039735.
- "HEARD Hillswick Eshaness Area Regeneration and Development - Our History, Whaling". www.heard.shetland.co.uk. 2006. Archived from the original on 31 October 2020.
- "Overview of Voe". Scottish Places.
- "Ronas Voe whaling station". Shetland Museum and Archives Photo Library.
