= Tingon =

Peninsula in the north-west of Northmavine, Shetland

Coordinates: 60.53°N 1.54°W

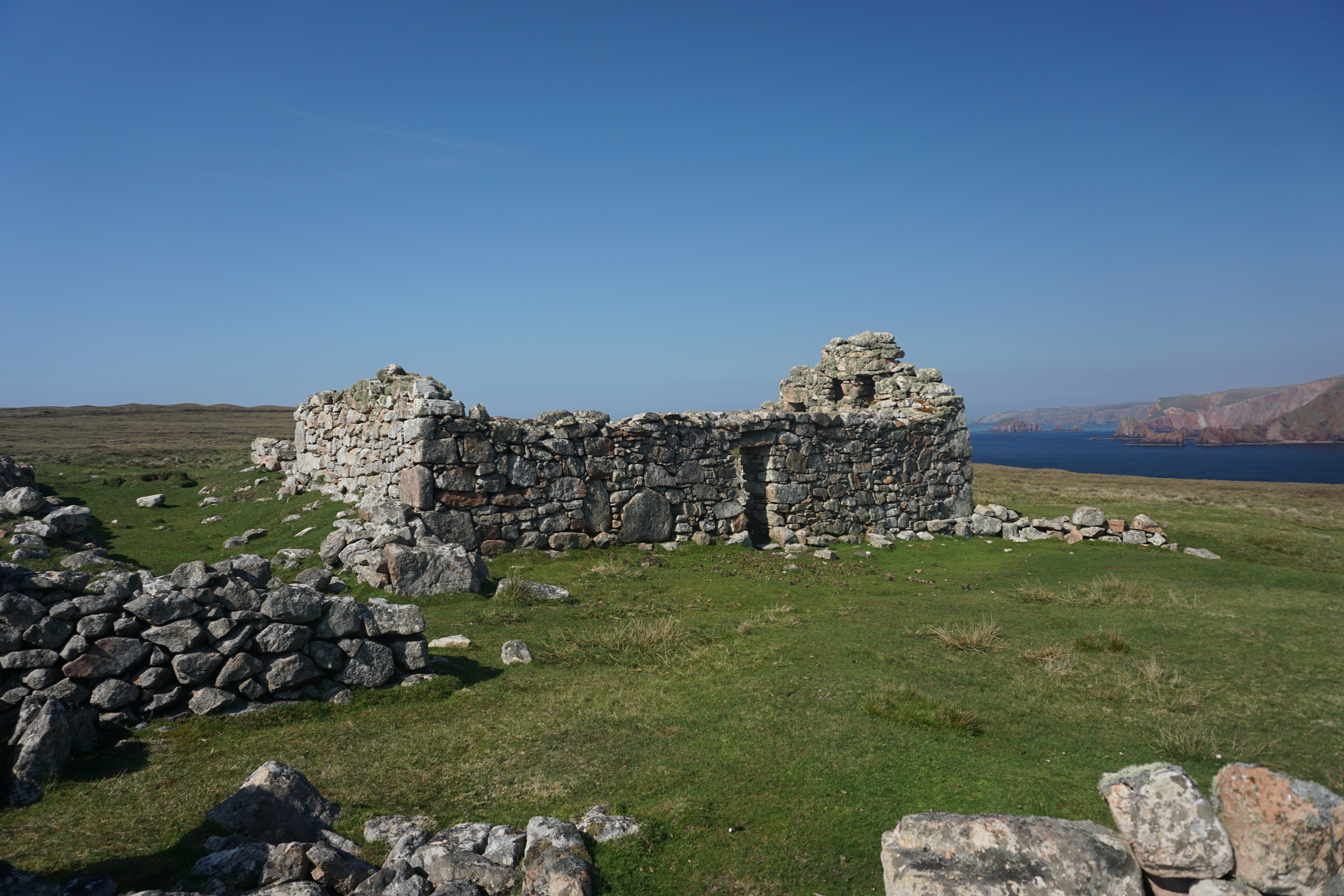
- Sumra, an abandoned croft house in Tingon

- Location within Shetland
- Population: 0
- Language: Shetland dialect
- OS grid reference: HU2482
- Civil parish: Northmavine
- Council area: Shetland
- Lieutenancy area: Shetland
- Country: Scotland
- Sovereign state: United Kingdom
- Post town: SHETLAND
- Postcode district: ZE2
- Dialling code: 01806
- Police: Scotland
- Fire: Scottish
- Ambulance: Scottish
- UK Parliament: Orkney and Shetland
- Scottish Parliament: Shetland

Ramsar Wetland
- Official name: Ronas Hill - North Roe & Tingon
- Designated: 11 October 1997
- Reference no.: 916

Tingon (Shaetlan pronunciation: [ˈtɪŋən] TING-ən) is a peninsula in the north-west of Northmavine, Shetland. It is delineated on the east by Ronas Voe, and on the west by Hamnavoe. It is also the collective name of a group of settlements on the peninsula, which were nearly all evicted as part of the Highland Clearances.

== Environment ==
Tingon is designated as a Ramsar site, a Special Protection Area, a Special Area of Conservation and a Site of Special Scientific Interest. It forms part of the Ronas Hill – North Roe and Tingon Important Bird Area (IBA), designated as such by BirdLife International because it supports a suite of moorland-breeding birds, including red-throated loons, great skuas and merlins.

== History ==
At its peak, Tingon had a number of crofts; there was a croft each at Knowes, Sannions, Sumra, Ocran, Ocraness, Quidadale, Westerhouse and Aurora (pronounced 'Rora). Additionally, Southerhouse, Northerhouse, and Easterhouse each had two crofts, making a total of 14. The name Aurora is believed to have been given to that croft by Magnus Manson (a son-in-law to smallpox inoculator Johnnie Notions), who served as a captain of the foretop in the Royal Navy during the time of Nelson on a ship of the same name.

=== Clearances ===
The crofts in Tingon were part of the Tangwick Estate, owned by the Cheynes of Tangwick, who were the lairds. At the time in question, the Tangwick Estate was operated by Henry and Barbara Cheyne. Henry Cheyne was a solicitor who practised in Edinburgh, and as such, they lived there rather than in Shetland. The Cheynes' involvement with affairs in Shetland were limited due to the impracticality of communicating at this distance, and only stayed in Shetland during holidays during the summer, so local affairs were therefore delegated to their factor, Arthur Gifford, who was additionally the laird for the Busta Estate.

Prior to the clearances, two of the tenants of Tingon – George "Black Geordie" Anderson, and his brother, Thomas "Tammie" Anderson – travelled to Australia and made a small fortune in one of the gold rushes there. When they returned to Shetland, their newfound wealth meant they had the money to pay an annual rent for the whole of the Tingon peninsula amounting to £90 (equivalent to £9,800 in 2025), which was more than double the rent paid by the rest of the other tenants living and working in Tingon combined. This offer was presumably proposed to Gifford, rather than the Cheynes, who accepted and allowed the rest of the tenants to be evicted to allow the Anderson brothers to use the entirety of the peninsula for the grazing of sheep. This practice was similarly carried out throughout many parts of the Highlands and Islands during this time; the evictions are collectively are known as the Highland Clearances. It is believed that the Cheynes had little knowledge of the evictions, and their previous dealings indicate that they were against clearing their tenants. The Cheynes are known to have traded land with the Busta Estate once before in order to prevent a tenant of theirs being cleared.

The Anderson brothers are believed to have themselves carried out the evictions of the other crofts in Tingon, and their process is reputed to have been "utterly ruthless". Several of the tenants were quite close relations to them, including the families of their brother Andrew Anderson, and two of their nephews, Thomas and John Anderson – all three were married and had their own children, and all of whom were cleared.

A letter describing the situation was sent to and published in a number of newspapers in Scotland, including the Dundee Advertiser, Edinburgh Evening Courant, Orkney Herald, John o' Groat Journal, Renfrewshire Independent, Paisley Herald and Renfrewshire Advertiser, Orcadian, Inverness Courier, and Dundee Courier. The letter criticised the actions taken as being short-sighted and detrimental to the local economy:

...One tenant may be more advantageous to the landlord than fourteen; but the fishcurers and consumers lose from twenty to thirty fishermen, the shop-keepers some seventy customers and perhaps the British Navy lose a good nursery for hardy seamen. But beef and mutton are at a premium, and men go to the wall to make room for four-footed animals. Scarcely any proprietor in Great Britain or Ireland has made a proper attempt to multiply and improve livestock by means favourable to an increase in the number and substance of the people. All seem to act on the supposition that in order to increase stock they must decrease population, ignoring what is done in some Continental countries where the opposite is the course of things; ignoring too, seemingly, the striking lesson afforded to them in Ireland, where, although for a time the cattle increased as the men decreased, the cattle themselves ultimately declined at an alarming rate, even as the crops had done previously.

The situation in which the evicted tenants were placed was exacerbated by the inaccessibility of the Tingon peninsula. The easiest method to move any amount of personal belongings was to transport it by boat. However, the majority of the perimeter of Tingon is surrounded by high sea-cliffs (excepting the two sites of the fishing lodges of Heillia, which are only accessible in calm weather). As such, all belongings had to be carried over land, which was much more difficult. The closest settlements, Braewick and Heylor, were each around three miles away by foot. Despite this, little was left behind, as even several of the grave markers for those who had died prior to the clearances were taken out on the evictees' backs – some of which were placed in the Old Hillswick Cemetery, and others in the Cross Kirk Cemetery in Eshaness.

=== The families cleared ===
At least seventeen families were cleared, many of which were extended families related to each other, and several of which were close relations of the Anderson brothers who were responsible for the conducting the evictions. (The relationships between many of the families are displayed in family trees below). The circumstances of some of the families are described below.

The family of Donald Tulloch and Mary Harrison (Note: Women in Shetland during this time generally kept their maiden names after marriage.) were one of the first (if not the first) of the families to be evicted. They had a two-year-old son Thomas and an infant daughter Grace ("Gracie"), who was carried out of Tingon in a [[#kishie|kishie]]. They constructed a faellie hoose in Murrion, Eshaness to live in until they were able to get one of the crofts in Braewick, Eshaness. Thomas was killed at the age of 9 after falling over cliffs near the Clavie, Eshaness while collecting birds eggs. Donald died in 1875 age 41, and it is suspected the trying situation following their clearance contributed to his early death. Gracie was the last living survivor of the Tingon clearances, having died in 1958 at age 93.

When the family of Gideon Hawick and Louisa "Lucy" Ratter, were cleared from Tingon, their two-year-old son Gideon was (in the same way as Gracie Tulloch) carried out in a kishie. While most other families moved into existing houses, they enclosed a new croft from existing scattald and built a house on the site, known as the Gill (or Pund) of Mangaster. During construction, the family lived in a skeo at the mouth of a burn nearby. They would have undertaken not only the construction of their house, but also outbuildings for livestock and a dry-stone dyke to enclose the arable land – the latter of which would have been necessary for the production of crops for their first winter. Given their situation, it is likely that they would have received assistance from neighbours.

The family of John Johnson were cleared from Aurora, Tingon, including two of his sons, of whom one was deaf-mute. John's clearance from Tingon marked the third time he had been cleared – firstly in 1822 when the crofts of Hillswick Ness were cleared, and secondly in 1834 from either Breckon or Framgord, Eshaness, when the West Park was created after the clearance of six crofts. John's wife Mary Cheyne died in 1864, the year before the Tingon clearances began.

One family was briefly spared eviction by the Andersons – that of Agnes Hanson, a resident of the Knowes. During the time of the clearances she was a widow in her eighties, and in previous years had been either a servant or seamstress for the Cheynes of Tangwick – as such, she had been granted permission by the Cheynes to stay in the Knowes for the rest of her life. However, when she died in November 1866, the Andersons immediately presented the remaining family with an eviction notice that read, "Get out, or we will drive you and your livestock over the banks." Hanson's daughters, Agnes and Margaret Smith, and Margaret's son Arthur Thomason moved to the Bruggs (also known as Capout), North Eshaness. Thomason was the last survivor to remember the events of the clearances, having died in 1923 at age 76.

==== Family trees ====
The following family trees show the families cleared by the Anderson brothers, and how many of the families were related to each other. For the sake of conciseness, additional relations who themselves were not cleared have been omitted from the trees unless to show how they are related to other families, or where they are otherwise mentioned in the article.

Families cleared from Tingon (and their relation to the only remaining tenants)

Moved from Westerhouse to Braewick before clearances
Hansi Anderson ♂ 1790‑1862 (d. age 72)	Isabella Hawick ♀ 1788‑1865 (d. age 77)	Thomas Hawick ♂ 1793‑1874 (d. age 81)	Mary Smith ♀ 1800‑1888 (d. age 88)
Clearers
Cleared from Westerhouse (or nearby), Tingon to Northhouse, Heylor
Ann Mouat ♀ 1815‑1893 (d. age 78)	Andrew Anderson ♂ 1814‑1883 (d. age 69)	Thomas Anderson ♂ Tammie; 1818‑1889 (d. age 71)	George Anderson ♂ Black Geordie; 1834‑1900 (d. age 66)
Cleared from Tingon to Leascole, Eshaness	Cleared from Tingon to Priesthoulland, Eshaness	Cleared from Tingon to Houllanstourie, Heylor
Ann Anderson Mouat ♀ 1842‑1891 (d. age 48)	John Anderson ♂ 1839‑after 1891 (d. age >53)	Jane Margaret Anderson ♀ 1855‑1935 (d. age 79); Cleared age 11	George Anderson ♂ 1857‑1880 (d. age 22); Cleared age 9	Thomas Anderson ♂ 1837‑1905 (d. age 68)	Agnes Hawick ♀ 1826‑1907 (d. age 80)	Thomas Hawick ♂ 1839‑1908 (d. age 68)	Jane Jamieson ♀ 1834‑1887 (d. age 53)
John Anderson ♂ 1866‑1866 (d. age 12 days)	Christopher Anderson ♂ 1864‑1890 (d. age 26)	Agnes Anderson ♀ 1860‑?	Thomas Anderson ♂ 1857‑?	Isabella Hawick Anderson ♀ 1859‑1907 (d. age 48)	Henry Anderson ♂ 1862‑1929 (d. age 66)	George Anderson ♂ 1864‑1943 (d. age 78)	Lilias Anderson ♀ 1867‑1880 (d. age 13)	Thomas Hawick ♂ 1864‑1900 (d. age 35)

Families cleared from Ocran and Ocraness

Cleared from Ocraness to Everor, Hillswick
Thomas Tulloch ♂ 1800‑1868 (d. age 67-68)	Janet Anderson ♀ 1791‑1876 (d. age 85)	John Harrison ♂ 1791‑1875 (d. age 84)	Grace Robertson ♀ 1794‑1877 (d. age 83)
Cleared from Ocran to Braewick
Laurence Tulloch ♂ 1825‑1868 (d. age 43)	Donald Tulloch ♂ 1834‑1875 (d. age 41); Cleared age 31	Mary Harrison ♀ 1835‑1911 (d. age 75); Cleared age 30	Elizabeth Tulloch ♀ 1826‑1856 (d. age 30)	William Harrison ♂ 1820‑1875 (d. age 54)	Ann Harrison ♀ 1818‑1877 (d. age 59)	Anderina Harrison ♀ 1823‑1903 (d. age 80)	Jane Margaret Harrison ♀ 1827‑1894 (d. age 67)	Agnes Harrison ♀ 1830‑1875 (d. age 45)
Robert Tulloch ♂ 1873‑1945 (d. age 72)	John Tulloch ♂ 1866‑1884 (d. age 17)	Thomas Tulloch ♂ 1862‑1872 (d. age 9); Cleared age ~3	Grace Tulloch ♀ Gracie; 1864‑1958 (d. age 93); Cleared age ~1	Elizabeth Harrison ♀ 1856‑1927 (d. age 71)	Anderina Harrison ♀ 1859‑?

Families cleared (continued)

Laurence Johnson ♂ 1783‑1856 (d. age 72)	Margaret Harrison ♀ 1778‑1862 (d. age 84)	Andrew Ratter ♂ 1779‑1866 (d. age 86)	Mary Tulloch ♀ 1783‑Bef 1851 (d. age <67)
Cleared from Ocraness to Heylor	Cleared from Sannions to Heylor	Cleared from Tingon to the Gill of Mangaster
Lilias Laurenson ♀ 1808‑1872 (d. age 64)	Donald Johnson ♂ Donald Laurenson; 1820‑1881 (d. age 60)	Henry Johnson ♂ Henry Laurenson; 1813‑1895 (d. age 81)	Elizabeth Ratter ♀ 1818‑1887 (d. age 69)	Gideon Smith Hawick ♂ 1832‑1909 (d. age 76)	Louisa Ratter ♀ Lucy; 1820‑1898 (d. age 78)	Gilbert Jamieson ♂ 1817‑1854 (d. age 37)
Agnes B. Nicolson ♀ ~1854‑?	Mary Johnson ♀ Mollay Laurenson; 1843‑1926 (d. age 82)	Anderina Johnson ♀ 1863‑? Cleared age 3	Gilbert Hawick ♂ 1863‑1941 (d. age 78)	Mally Jamieson ♀ 1846‑1906 (d. age 60)	Agnes Jamieson ♀ 1848‑1907 (d. age 58)	Janet Jamieson ♀ 1850‑1931 (d. age 80)	John Jamieson ♂ 1853‑?

Families cleared (continued)

Cleared from Aurora to North Stow, Eshaness
John Johnson ♂ 1795‑1880 (d. age 85)	Mary Cheyne ♀ 1800‑1864 (d. age 64)
Thomas Johnson ♂ 1826‑1875 (d. age 48)	Peter Johnson ♂ 1834‑1904 (d. age 70)

=== The Andersons' tenancy ===
The Anderson brothers constructed a house named Newtown upon the Easterhouse crofts following the clearance of the rest of the tenants. Judging by the quality of the house's construction, and the fact that Welsh slate was used for the roof (which would have been difficult to transport there before there was any road to the area), it is thought the house was constructed by professional stonemasons. The brothers and each of their respective families are believed to have lived a somewhat luxurious lifestyle, having "wine with their breakfast".

The brothers and each of their respective families are said to have lived in opposite ends of the house. While this was probably by intention initially, this situation was likely reinforced by the fact the brothers were quarrelsome with each other and frequently fell out, leading them to communicate by pushing letters under each other's doors. Beside this, hostility between the brothers is known to have frequently escalated, resulting in fights. On one occasion, a fight between the brothers upon the Glure Beach (between the Scarff and Hamnavoe) escalated to the point where they were at risk of strangling each other, and one "Donald of the Scarff" noticed the altercation and was able to break it up.

In The Story of Tingon, genealogist Bruce Benson recounts the behaviour ascribed to Tammie Anderson on two separate instances:

Tammie had gone to Hillswick one day to fetch a ram, the animal had probably come up from south by boat to Hillswick, and most likely had not been used to a tether. Tammie struggled on with him until he reached the north side of Greenfield. By then he was in a rage, and so he took out his pocket knife and cut the throat of the poor beast. On another occasion Tammie was moving a flock of sheep from one park to another in Tingon. There was some snow and ice on the ground, and the sheep were reluctant to proceed over a sheet of ice, which was near to the banks. He set the dog on them and finally got them on to the ice. One by one they slid over the banks. Tammie and the dog returned to the house. By then he was in a rage, and the dog was supposed to turn on him. He got the dog by the hind legs and battered him along the wall of the house until he killed him.

== See also ==
- Eshaness
- Ronas Voe
- Heylor
- Highland Clearances
- List of clearance settlements in Scotland

== Glossary ==
banks
Shetland dialect: sea cliffs
factor
a person or firm charged with superintending or managing properties and estates — sometimes where the owner or landlord is unable to or uninterested in attending to such details personally.
faellie hoose
Shetland dialect: a house constructed using turves. From Shetland dialect: fael – sod or turf.
kishie
Shetland dialect: a type of basket traditionally used for carrying peats.
scattald
Shetland dialect: common grazings allocated to many crofters.
skeo
Shetland dialect: a hut of loosely constructed stone for wind-drying meat or fish.

== Sources ==
=== Main ===
- Benson, Bruce. The Story of Tingon. Tangwick Haa Museum.
- "Evictions in Shetland". Dundee Advertiser. 8 June 1865. p. 2.
- "Evictions in Shetland". Dundee Courier. 22 June 1865. p. 2.
- "Evictions in Shetland". The Edinburgh Evening Courant. 9 June 1865. p. 4.
- "Evictions in Shetland". Inverness Courier. 22 June 1865. p. 6.
- "Evictions in Shetland". John o' Groat Journal. 15 June 1865. p. 2.
- "Evictions in Shetland". Orcadian. 20 June 1865. p. 3.
- "Evictions in Shetland". The Orkney Herald, and Weekly Advertiser and Gazette for the Orkney & Zetland Islands. 13 June 1865. p. 1.
- "Evictions in Shetland". Paisley Herald and Renfrewshire Advertiser. 17 June 1865. p. 6.
- "Evictions in Shetland". Renfrewshire Independent. 17 June 1865. p. 3.
- "Natura 2000 – Standard Data Form" (PDF). JNCC. 15 January 2016.
- "Ronas Hill - North Roe & Tingon". Ramsar Sites Information Service. 1 January 2007.
- "Ronas Hill - North Roe & Tingon". Natura 2000. December 2015 [1997].
- "Tingon SSSI". SiteLink.

=== Additional ===
- Anderton, H. F. (1890s). ""Fellie hoose" at Ham, Vaila". Shetland Museum and Archives.
- Carpenter, Daniel (9 March 2019). "Kishie basket making". The Heritage Crafts Association.
- Graham, John J. (2010a) [1979]. "banks". Shetland ForWirds.
- Graham, John J. (2010b) [1979]. "fael". Shetland ForWirds.
- Graham, John J. (2010c) [1979]. "scattald". Shetland ForWirds.
- Graham, John J. (2010d) [1979]. "skeo". Shetland ForWirds.
- Gott, Tony, ed. (12 May 2013). "Agnes Anderson". North Isles Family History (bayanne.info/Shetland). I148469.
- Gott, Tony, ed. (3 March 2017). "Andrew Anderson". North Isles Family History (bayanne.info/Shetland). I47903.
- Gott, Tony, ed. (14 March 1999). "Christopher Anderson". North Isles Family History (bayanne.info/Shetland). I148471.
- Gott, Tony, ed. (23 December 2006). "George Anderson". North Isles Family History (bayanne.info/Shetland). I148441.
- Gott, Tony, ed. (2 January 2017). "George Anderson". North Isles Family History (bayanne.info/Shetland). I136714.
- Gott, Tony, ed. (5 January 2014). "George Halcrow Anderson". North Isles Family History (bayanne.info/Shetland). I136720.
- Gott, Tony, ed. (15 December 2018). "Hansi Anderson". North Isles Family History (bayanne.info/Shetland). I8447.
- Gott, Tony, ed. (12 May 2013). "Henry Anderson". North Isles Family History (bayanne.info/Shetland). I148490.
- Gott, Tony, ed. (12 May 2013). "Isabella Hawick Anderson". North Isles Family History (bayanne.info/Shetland). I148489.
- Gott, Tony, ed. (3 March 2017). "Jane Margaret Anderson". North Isles Family History (bayanne.info/Shetland). I120943.
- Gott, Tony, ed. (3 September 2017). "Janet Anderson". North Isles Family History (bayanne.info/Shetland). I74533.
- Gott, Tony, ed. (15 December 2018). "John Anderson". North Isles Family History (bayanne.info/Shetland). I143680.
- Gott, Tony, ed. (12 May 2013). "John Anderson". North Isles Family History (bayanne.info/Shetland). I148472.
- Gott, Tony, ed. (3 April 2008). "Lilias Anderson". North Isles Family History (bayanne.info/Shetland). I148491.
- Gott, Tony, ed. (14 May 2019). "Thomas Anderson". North Isles Family History (bayanne.info/Shetland). I8446.
- Gott, Tony, ed. (7 January 2008). "Thomas Anderson". North Isles Family History (bayanne.info/Shetland). I136713.
- Gott, Tony, ed. (12 May 2013). "Thomas Anderson". North Isles Family History (bayanne.info/Shetland). I148488.
- Gott, Tony, ed. (6 January 2008). "Mary Cheyne". North Isles Family History (bayanne.info/Shetland). I144312.
- Gott, Tony, ed. (7 January 2008). "Lilias Laurenson". North Isles Family History (bayanne.info/Shetland). I149555.
- Gott, Tony, ed. (22 September 2019). "Agnes Hawick". North Isles Family History (bayanne.info/Shetland). I121630.
- Gott, Tony, ed. (16 May 2015). "Gilbert Hawick". North Isles Family History (bayanne.info/Shetland). I116214.
- Gott, Tony, ed. (7 January 2008). "Isabella Hawick". North Isles Family History (bayanne.info/Shetland). I122303.
- Gott, Tony, ed. (4 August 2005). "Thomas Hawick". North Isles Family History (bayanne.info/Shetland). I121627.
- Gott, Tony, ed. (27 December 2016). "Thomas Hawick". North Isles Family History (bayanne.info/Shetland). I104973.
- Gott, Tony, ed. (5 December 2017). "Thomas Hawick". North Isles Family History (bayanne.info/Shetland). I148519.
- Gott, Tony, ed. (7 January 2008). "Agnes Harrison". North Isles Family History (bayanne.info/Shetland). I136640.
- Gott, Tony, ed. (7 January 2008). "Anderina Harrison". North Isles Family History (bayanne.info/Shetland). I136638.
- Gott, Tony, ed. (27 April 1999). "Anderina Harrison". North Isles Family History (bayanne.info/Shetland). I163037.
- Gott, Tony, ed. (7 January 2008). "Ann Harrison". North Isles Family History (bayanne.info/Shetland). I136637.
- Gott, Tony, ed. (23 December 2006). "Elizabeth Harrison". North Isles Family History (bayanne.info/Shetland). I56423.
- Gott, Tony, ed. (7 January 2008). "Jane Margaret Harrison". North Isles Family History (bayanne.info/Shetland). I136639.
- Gott, Tony, ed. (7 January 2008). "John Harrison". North Isles Family History (bayanne.info/Shetland). I136635.
- Gott, Tony, ed. (15 December 2018). "Margaret Harrison". North Isles Family History (bayanne.info/Shetland). I145239.
- Gott, Tony, ed. (8 October 2017). "Mary Harrison". North Isles Family History (bayanne.info/Shetland). I136642.
- Gott, Tony, ed. (31 August 2017). "William Harrison". North Isles Family History (bayanne.info/Shetland). I74541.
- Gott, Tony, ed. (8 May 2014). "Gideon Smith Hawick". North Isles Family History (bayanne.info/Shetland). I116213.
- Gott, Tony, ed. (22 January 1999). "Agnes Jamieson". North Isles Family History (bayanne.info/Shetland). I102737.
- Gott, Tony, ed. (1 September 2003). "Gilbert Jamieson". North Isles Family History (bayanne.info/Shetland). I102738.
- Gott, Tony, ed. (22 January 1999). "Janet Jamieson". North Isles Family History (bayanne.info/Shetland). I102741.
- Gott, Tony, ed. (12 May 2013). "John Jamieson". North Isles Family History (bayanne.info/Shetland). I143034.
- Gott, Tony, ed. (22 January 1999). "Mally Jamieson". North Isles Family History (bayanne.info/Shetland). I102740.
- Gott, Tony, ed. (28 April 1999). "Anderina Johnson". North Isles Family History (bayanne.info/Shetland). I148583.
- Gott, Tony, ed. (5 January 2014). "Donald Johnson". North Isles Family History (bayanne.info/Shetland). I108385.
- Gott, Tony, ed. (9 December 2018). "Henry Johnson". North Isles Family History (bayanne.info/Shetland). I149556.
- Gott, Tony, ed. (6 January 2008). "John Johnson". North Isles Family History (bayanne.info/Shetland). I107412.
- Gott, Tony, ed. (15 December 2018). "Laurence Johnson". North Isles Family History (bayanne.info/Shetland). I145238.
- Gott, Tony, ed. (2 August 2011). "Mary Johnson". North Isles Family History (bayanne.info/Shetland). I115136.
- Gott, Tony, ed. (6 January 2008). "Peter Johnson". North Isles Family History (bayanne.info/Shetland). I144316.
- Gott, Tony, ed. (22 September 2019). "Thomas Johnson". North Isles Family History (bayanne.info/Shetland). I92404.
- Gott, Tony, ed. (7 January 2008). "Ann Mouat". North Isles Family History (bayanne.info/Shetland). I142895.
- Gott, Tony, ed. (19 March 1999). "Ann Anderson Mouat". North Isles Family History (bayanne.info/Shetland). I24294.
- Gott, Tony, ed. (26 June 2019). "Andrew Ratter". North Isles Family History (bayanne.info/Shetland). I74472.
- Gott, Tony, ed. (9 December 2018). "Elizabeth Ratter". North Isles Family History (bayanne.info/Shetland). I108388.
- Gott, Tony, ed. (20 March 1999). "Louisa Ratter". North Isles Family History (bayanne.info/Shetland). I102739.
- Gott, Tony, ed. (7 January 2008). "Grace Robertson". North Isles Family History (bayanne.info/Shetland). I136636.
- Gott, Tony, ed. (5 January 2014). "Mary Smith". North Isles Family History (bayanne.info/Shetland). I121628.
- Gott, Tony, ed. (8 October 2017). "Donald Tulloch". North Isles Family History (bayanne.info/Shetland). I74538.
- Gott, Tony, ed. (31 August 2017). "Elizabeth Tulloch". North Isles Family History (bayanne.info/Shetland). I74540.
- Gott, Tony, ed. (12 February 2004). "Grace Tulloch". North Isles Family History (bayanne.info/Shetland). I105311.
- Gott, Tony, ed. (12 May 2013). "John Tulloch". North Isles Family History (bayanne.info/Shetland). I105312.
- Gott, Tony, ed. (31 August 2017). "Laurence Tulloch". North Isles Family History (bayanne.info/Shetland). I74537.
- Gott, Tony, ed. (1 November 2002). "Mary Tulloch". North Isles Family History (bayanne.info/Shetland). I65745.
- Gott, Tony, ed. (3 October 2017). "Robert Tulloch". North Isles Family History (bayanne.info/Shetland). I105313.
- Gott, Tony, ed. (31 August 2017). "Thomas Tulloch". North Isles Family History (bayanne.info/Shetland). I74532.
- Gott, Tony, ed. (22 December 2015). "Thomas Tulloch". North Isles Family History (bayanne.info/Shetland). I105310.
- "Society Premises and Research Tips". Shetland Family History Society. 2013.
