= Ronas Voe =

Bay in the Shetland Islands, Scotland

- Rønies Voe (Shaetlan)
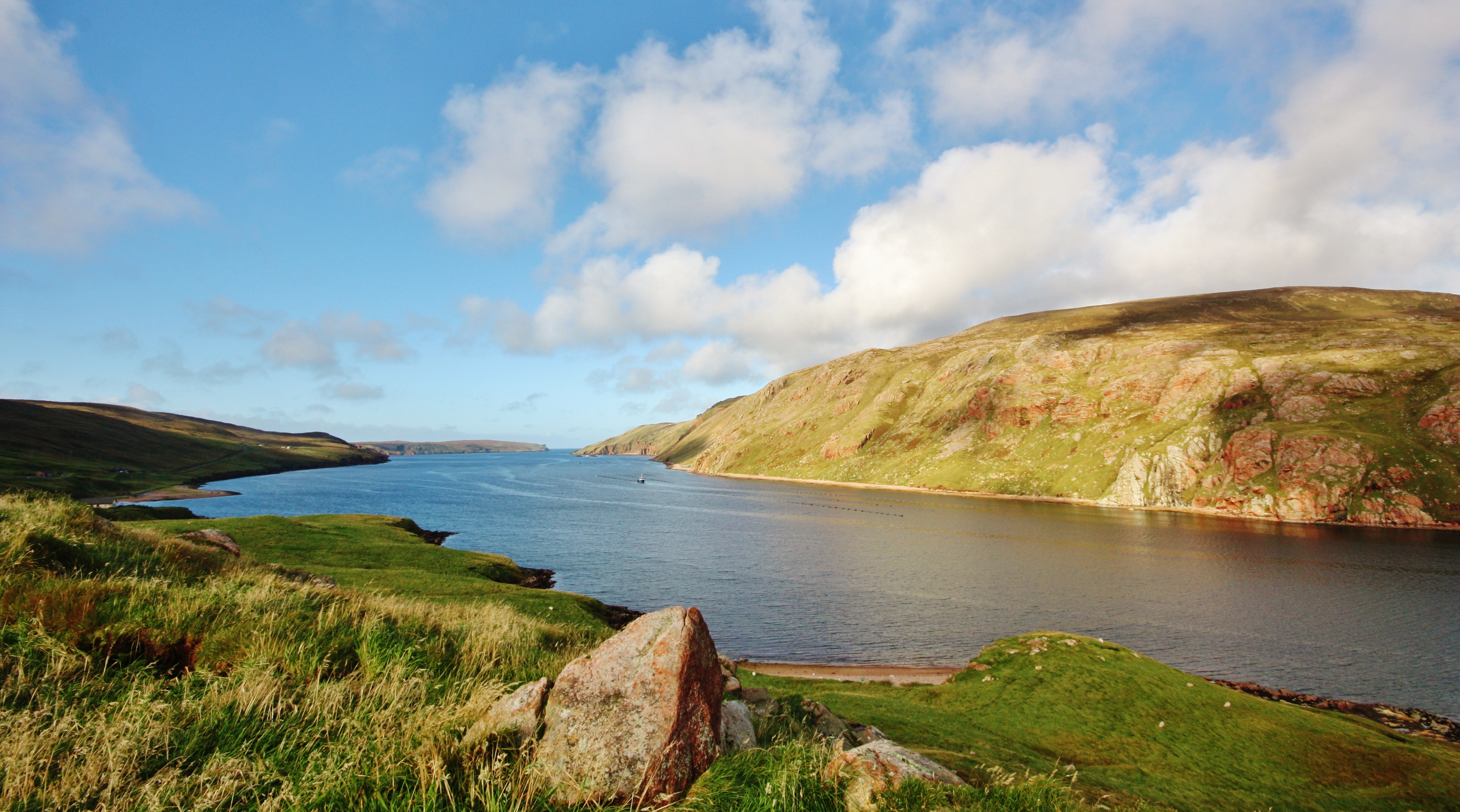
- Ronas Voe from above the abandoned Timna crofthouse.

- Location within Shetland
- Location: Northmavine, Shetland
- Coordinates: 60°31′15″N 1°28′44″W
- Type: Voe
- Ocean/sea sources: Atlantic
- Max. length: 10.0 km (6.2 mi)
- Max. width: 3.1 km (1.9 mi)
- Max. depth: 42 m (138 ft)
- Islands: 0 islands, several sea stacks

Ronas Voe (Shaetlan pronunciation: [ˈrø̞nis ˌvo̞ː] Shaetlan: Rønies Voe) is a voe in Northmavine, Shetland. It divides the land between Ronas Hill, Shetland's tallest mountain, and the Tingon peninsula. It is the second largest voe in Shetland, the largest being Sullom Voe. The townships of Heylor, Voe and Swinister are located on its shores, and the township of Assater is under a kilometre away.

== Etymology ==
Ronas Voe takes its name from Ronas Hill, which it lies adjacent to. Voe is a Shaetlan word for a fjord or inlet.

The name Ronas Hill has been attributed to a few different derivations. One of the earliest was suggested by P. A. Munch (who used the spelling Rooeness) - he claimed the name originates from the Old Norse roði or rauði (redness, referring to the red granite that characterises the area) and ness (headland), which he compared to the name and red rock found in Muckle Roe. This would make Ronas Voe Rauðanessvágr - vágr meaning inlet, thus "inlet of the red headland". However, Jakob Jakobsen denounced this, suggesting the name derives from the Old Norse hraun (a rough or rocky place, a wilderness). In the publication of his lecture on Shetland place names, Jakobsen used the spelling Rønis, and a footnote explicitly states "The spelling 'Roeness hill' (I need not speak of 'Ronas' hill at all) is erroneous." Ronas was the spelling adopted by Ordnance Survey in their first maps of the area published in 1881, and as such it has become the most commonly used English spelling. The justification for selecting this particular spelling was that Ronas was the "older form", and considering there was no consensus on which of the two previously described etymologies was correct, selecting it would "not commit [Ordnance Survey] to either supposition."

Before the standardisation of English orthography, Ronas Hill and Ronas Voe were referred to using a multitude of different spellings, even with different spellings being used within the same source. Some of the spellings include Renis, Rennis, Reniſſert, Renes, Reinsfelt, Renisfelt, Reinsfield, Ronisvo, Ronnes, Roones, Rona, Rona's, Rons, Ronaldi, Roeness, Rooeness, Ronise, Ronnis, Runnis, Runess, Rønis, Rønies, etc.

In some Dutch sources, Ronas Hill is referred to as the Blaeuwe or Blauwe Bergen (the "Blue Mountain"), while the noa-name for Ronas Hill used by some local fishermen is Bloberg, referring to its blue appearance at a far distance.

== Geography ==
Ronas Voe has been named Shetland's "only true fjord". The cliffs of Ronas Voe are the result of ancient glaciers cutting through a ridge of raised land. The cliffs at the Brough are an example of a roche moutonnée, in which the exposed rock has been sculpted by the passing glacier creating a smooth surface up-ice, and a rough exterior on the rock down-ice.

In August 2014 high amounts of rain resulted in a landslide that caused part of the road in Heylor to be temporarily blocked.

=== Beaches ===
There are numerous beaches along the shore of Ronas Voe, including the Lang Ayre, Shetland's longest beach, and the Blade, which during the summer months is a nesting site for Arctic terns.

==== List of beaches ====
Clockwise around the voe:

- Lang Ayre
- Slocka
- The Shun
- Ayre of Teogs
- Orr Wick
- Hollander's Ayre
- The Blade
- Sanda Cailla
- Ships Ayre
- Sannions Ayre

== History ==
=== Battle of Ronas Voe ===
On 14 March 1674 Ronas Voe was the site of the Battle of Ronas Voe, in which the Dutch East India Company ship Wapen van Rotterdam was captured by the English Royal Navy ships HMS Cambridge, HMS Newcastle and HMS Crown. From this event comes one of the earliest descriptions of Ronas Voe by Richard Carter, captain of Crown:

"...in my letter to M[aste]^{r} Pepys I have given a [sic] account of Cap[tai]^{n} Wetwangs laboring the Dutch East India Shipp w[hi]^{ch} was droue into Ronisvo a very good and sound harbor for 500 Sayle of Shipps of ye N[orth] W[es]^{t} part of Shotland..."

=== The ornithologist's guide to the islands of Orkney and Shetland ===
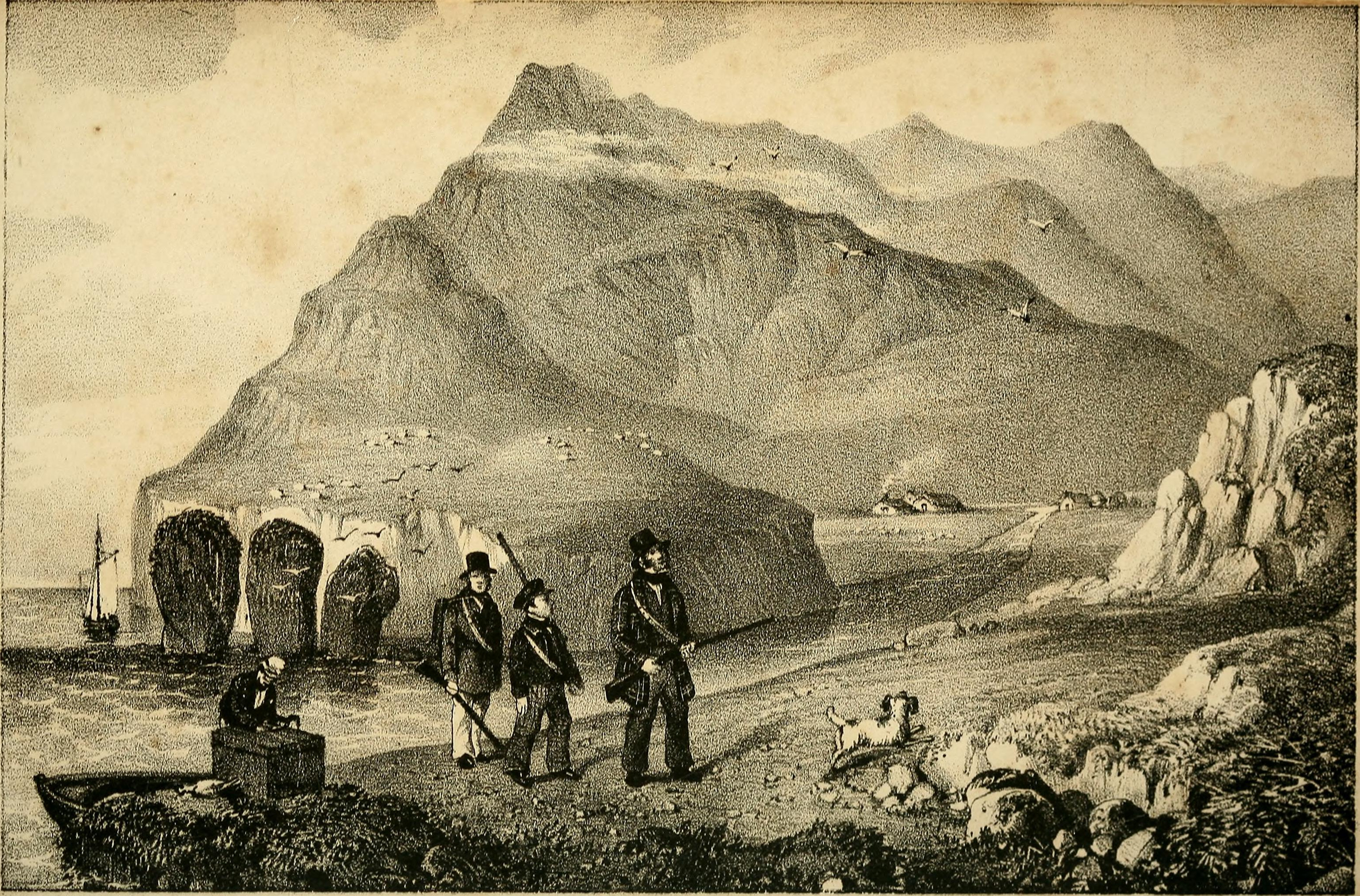
A lithograph of a "faithful delineation" of Ronas Hill showing Ronas Voe. From a sketch by Robert Dunn, printed by Charles Joseph Hullmandel.

In 1831, ornithologist Robert Dunn visited Shetland to acquire specimens for his collection, and in 1837 published the notes from his trip "for the purpose of furnishing a guide to those who might be desirous of visiting these islands to collect specimens of Natural History". He spent a considerable portion of his stay living in Assater, exploring Ronas Voe and Ronas Hill multiple times.

After a first brief trip across the voe on his first day staying in Assater, he described the return from a second trip out of Ronas Voe:

... when we were about four miles from the mouth of the voe, a strong breeze of wind sprung up from the westward, the sea at the same time rising very rapidly; giving us sufficient warning to exert ourselves, and endeavour to get into a place of security as speedily as possible. For some time we pulled in a direct line for Rona's Voe, but the wind, which had sprung up very rapidly abeam, obliged us to alter our course, as the water threatened every moment to break into the boat; we therefore brought her head to the sea, intending, with the assistance of the oars, to keep her in this position, and weather out the gale. Not much liking the idea of remaining here any length of time exposed to the storm, I held a consultation with the boatmen as to the best mode of proceeding. Some were for making a fair wind of it, and advised that we should set sail and run for an inlet about eight miles distant, observing that it was nearly high water, and that when it began to ebb the sea would be still more highly agitated, and consequently the danger would be greater; others dissented from this opinion and were for taking to the oars again, for the purpose of getting into Rona's Voe. Thinking the latter plan the most advisable, we put the boat about and pulled for the voe. The tide was already ebbing, forming another obstacle, and we now had wind, tide, and sea to contend against. We got some shelter for a few minutes behind one of the large stacks, and during this respite baled out the boat, trimmed her as well as we could with the two seals I shot before the storm came on, set my son astride of them, and held the dog so as to keep the boat steady. I then asked the men if they thought they were able to pull the boat against wind and tide; they replied they would try, but the majority were for turning back to the other inlet, a proposition which I would not agree to. I now gave the men a glass of whiskey each and some biscuit, and proposed to make Rona's Inlet: this required a desperate effort. As there was another stack a little distance from the one we were sheltered under, and the sea by this time began to break very fearfully between them, I determined to wait for a 'lull', as the sailors call it, which there generally is after three or four seas. Each of us got an oar in his hands ready for the attempt; we counted the four seas, then pulled with all our strength, and got out from between the two stacks before the sea broke in again; and being now out of the greatest danger, we pulled on in this way for four miles, during which time such was our anxiety that I think there was not a word spoken by any one. The wind was blowing so strongly against us that we could not tell whether we were making any way or not. When we arrived in the voe we got shelter, and being both wet and fatigued, rested ourselves and took a little more spirits. Several seals had followed us; we could pay no attention to them at the time, but having now got into shelter, I prepared my guns, as I expected they would come around us; and I was not disappointed, for as soon as I had my gun ready, one came staring up at the stern of the boat, which I shot instantly. We now pulled to our landing-place, about two miles up the voe, and arrived at home about two o'clock in the morning. The people told us they never expected we had gone out of the voe in such a stormy day, and the fishermen at the fishing-station would not believe we had been on the west side of Rona's Hill and got safe on shore again in such a heavy gale of wind.

Dunn's extensive shooting of the wildlife was apparent the following year (1832), as William Chapman Hewitson visited Shetland with a similar purpose to Dunn - to collect birds and their eggs for his own collection, for the Newcastle Museum and to be able to write his book British Oology. Hewitson visited Ronas Hill and wrote of his experience:

Our main object was to get some eggs of the Skua Gull...and had soon the pleasure of examining one of these fine birds, first on the wing and afterwards dead at our feet. We went to their head-quarters and were much disappointed in not seeing more of them. They were once abundant here but the last year a man of the name of Dunn, a bird stuffer from Hull, for his own private gain nearly extirpated this rare bird. We did not during the day see above 5 or 6 pairs.

It is likely that Hewitson had been informed of Dunn by Mr Cheyne of Ollaberry, whom they had visited the previous day before their visit to Ronas Hill. Cheyne's brother John Cheyne of Tangwick, the local laird, had the previous year hosted Dunn at his residence, sparing Dunn from spending a night in Stenness, Eshaness, in what Dunn described as "[a hut] hung inside and out with fish; the smell of some, in a state of putrefaction, being by no means an agreeable accompaniment". This was despite the fact Dunn described himself as being "well habituated to the living as well as dead nuisances infesting a Shetland hut." Dunn upon returning to Shetland several years later, was accused by John Cheyne of "thinning [the skua population] more than any other person", Dunn however claimed:

...in this [John Cheyne] was certainly mistaken, as I did not take so many as to injure the breed; these gulls were however so scarce when I last visited the islands, that I had great difficulty in obtaining permission to visit the places where they breed, the landlord assigning as a reason for his refusal that the birds had almost become extinct, but allowed me, as a great favour, to shoot a single pair.

Dunn's explanation for the decline in the skua population was that "several parties from the South travelled through Shetland, principally for amusement, and having fowling-pieces with them, destroyed indiscriminately every bird that came within their reach", as well as mentioning "a great number were also shot by the officers of a cutter which was stationed in Rona's Voe for two or three months."

=== Return of the whaleship Diana ===
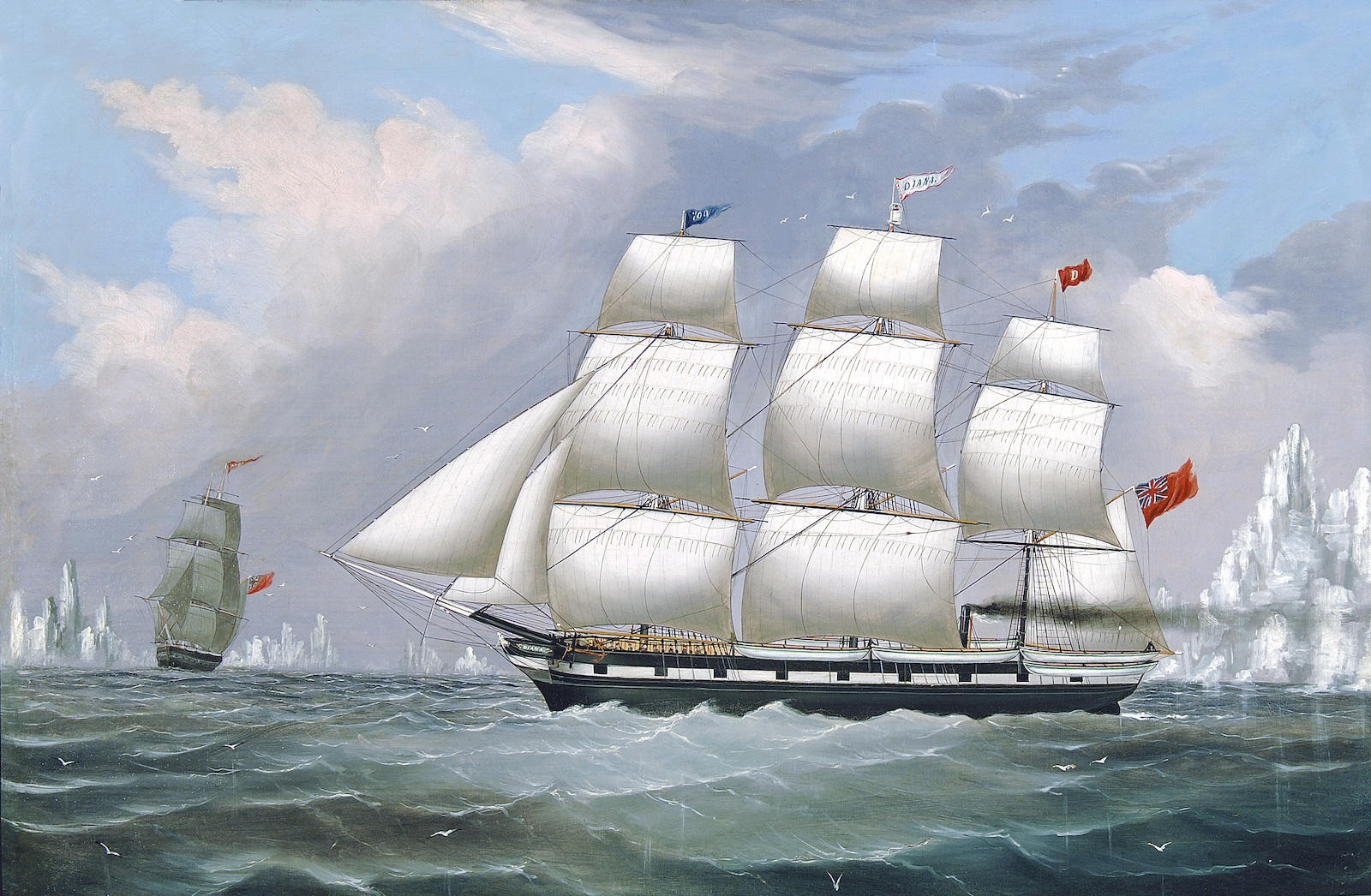
Diana (1840), by James H. Wheldon

In 1866, the whaleship Diana of Hull set out on a voyage in search of whales and seals, and became trapped in ice for many months in the Davis Strait between Greenland and Canada. The crew's supplies were not sufficient to last them the extended time, meaning many of the crew became gradually more ill with scurvy and fatigue. The ship did eventually break free of the ice on 17 March 1867 and after what was termed "a race with death" in the publication of the ship's surgeon's diaries, Diana made its first landfall following the ordeal in Ronas Voe. On 2 April 1867 at 11am, the remaining crew who were able enough to work the ship limped it into Ronas Voe. As they entered, eight corpses lay on the deck, and only two of the crew were able to make their way above deck to call for help. Six local men were taken aboard to work the ship's pumps, as the ship was taking on water at a significant rate and the crew were too fatigued to exert themselves. Two crew died on the day of arrival suffering from severe scurvy and exhaustion - Frederick Lockham of Hull and Gideon Fraser of Papa Stour. Three further crew died in the following days - Hercules "Haslas" Anderson, John Thompson and Alexander Robertson - all Shetlanders.

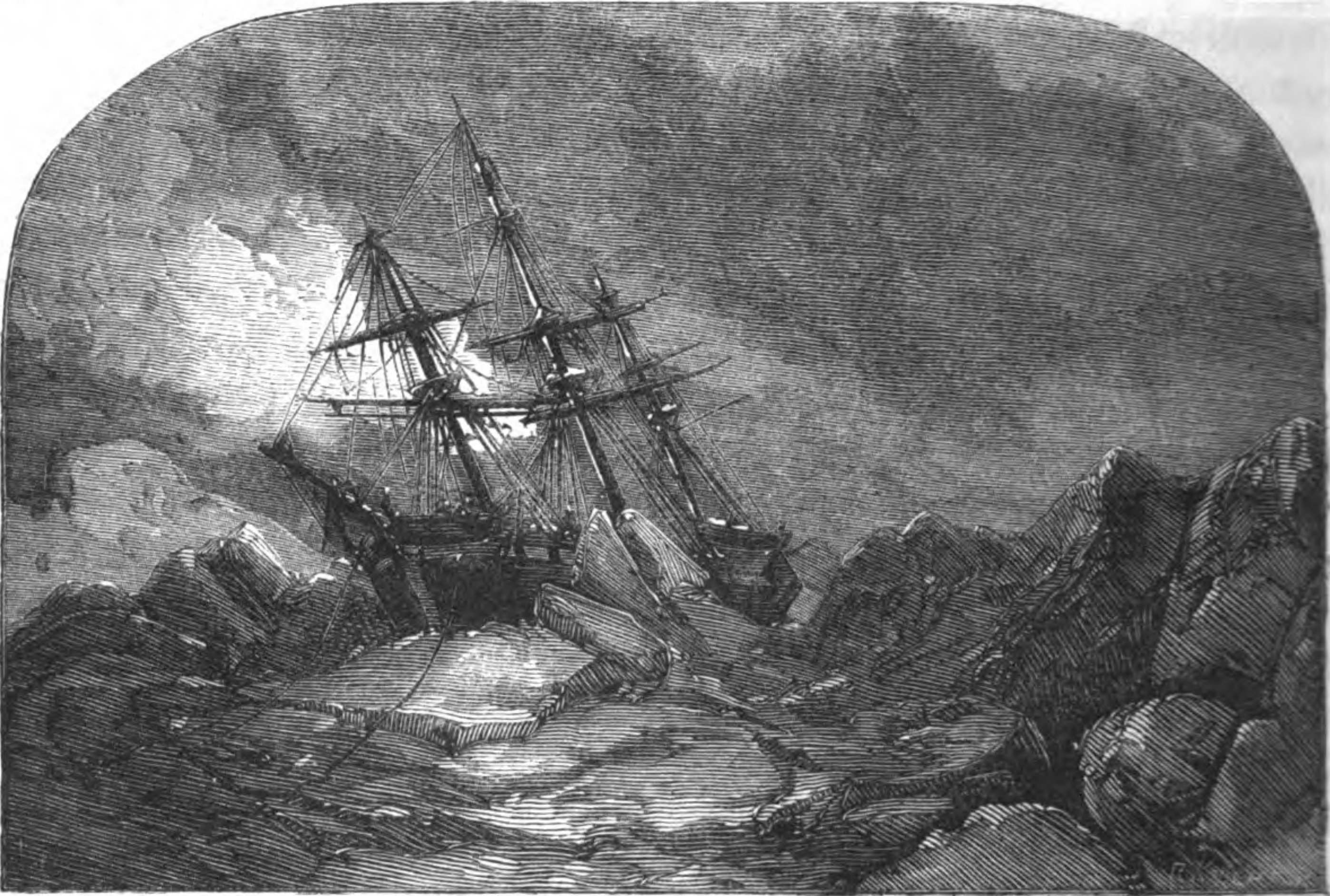
Diana stuck in the ice - The Cornhill Magazine 1867

Multiple references are made to the kindness received by the crew from those who came to their aid. One of the two crew who was able to go above deck upon entering Ronas Voe told The Scotsman:

The people in the neighbourhood were uncommonly kind: I never met with so much attention in all my life. They would have done anything for us, and sent on board men to help us, and supplied us with all kinds of provisions. When I left the ship to come to Lerwick with the news of our arrival, a gentleman close by gave me his own topcoat to travel in, and I found the good of it too.

Allen Young wrote in The Cornhill Magazine at the time:

With the aid of help from the shore the ship was brought safely to anchor, and a message dispatched to Lerwick for assistance. The kind people of the neighbourhood sent off refreshments, and every attention was given to the poor worn-out sailors, who speak with the greatest gratitude of all the kindness they received.

Diana was kept in Ronas Voe for a week where it was provided for by the locals in terms of victuals, repair work and seven hundredweight of coal to allow stoves to be reheated. On 8 April, a further eight tons of coal sent from Lerwick arrived and was loaded by the locals. The next day, Diana raised anchor and was directed to Tofts Voe, and in the following days onward through Yell Sound to Dury Voe and Lerwick.

=== Fishing ===
==== Haaf ====
Ronas Voe had a fishing station that was in use during the Haaf era, and 4 or 5 boats operated from it, however this was quite small in comparison to other stations in Northmavine, such as Stenness (between 40 and 50 boats) and Fethaland (about 60 boats).

==== Herring ====
Ronas Voe saw significant activity during the herring boom. In 1891, there were 10 herring curers listed as operating out of Ronas Voe:

Curer	Based
A. Brown & Co.	Peterhead
A. Stephen & Son	Peterhead
John Bisset	Fraserburgh
R. M. Stephen & Co.	Peterhead
M. Stephen	Peterhead
Summers & Co.	Peterhead
James McGhee	Peterhead
Wm. Mitchell	Fraserburgh
Z. M. Hamilton	Whalsay
– May	Peterhead

By 1905, there were 11:

Curer	Based
George Couper	Helmsdale
W. Cuthbert	Helmsdale
W. Stephen, Jr.	Peterhead
Sendler & Co.	Stettin
P. R. Paterson	Fraserburgh
George Stephen & Co.	Peterhead
R. M. Stephen & Sons	Peterhead
A Stephen & Sons	Peterhead
Overall & Co.	Peterhead
G. & D. Cormack	Wick
John McAulay	Helmsdale

=== Whaling ===
Two Norwegian whaling stations were constructed in Ronas Voe in the beginning of the 20th Century - the Zetland Whale Fishing Company and the Norrona Whale Fishing Company opened in April and June 1903 respectively, and operated until 1914. While some work was made available for the locals, there was push-back against the factories due to the smell of the operations and pollution left upon the nearby beaches. Those engaged in the herring fishing also believed that the waste products of processing the whales (some of which ended up in the sea) attracted sharks that frightened off the herring shoals. A committee to investigate these claims was set up in 1904, however it wasn't able to determine a connection between the whaling and a downturn in the herring catch.

==== Economics ====
Station	Economic Activity		1908	1909	1910	1911	1912	1913	1914	Source
Zetland	Whales landed		81	71	53	25	20	50	65	
Zetland	Products value	Total (Note: Including whale oil, manure, baleen, and in the case of Norrona, meat meal and bone meal)	£7,768						£6,264	
Zetland	Products value	of which oil	£5,380						£4,940	
Norrona	Whales landed		52	60	65	36	16	59	67	
Norrona	Products value	Total	£3,251						£4,285	
Norrona	Products value	of which oil	£2,256						£3,200	

=== Jenny Gilbertson films ===
"Thoughtful wife" (Phemie Clark) and "Rasmie" (Johnnie Clark) in Scenes from a Shetland croft life

Jenny Gilbertson was one of the world's first female documentary filmmakers. Four of her earliest productions were filmed in Ronas Voe, often involving the Clark family, their croft and their house. Two of her feature-length films - A crofter's life in Shetland and The rugged island; a Shetland lyric contain scenes filmed in Ronas Voe, while the short films Scenes from a Shetland croft life and In sheep's clothing were filmed entirely in Ronas Voe.

For The rugged island, the abandoned Timna crofthouse was repaired for the purpose of filming, however it was not intended for use as a dwelling and so was never lived in afterwards.

=== Second World War ===
Although Ronas Voe itself was not directly attacked, military activity in the wider area was occasionally visible. One local resident recalled seeing German aircraft over Ronas Voe on at least one or two occasions. In one instance, a German aircraft that had apparently been involved in a raid near Sullom Voe flew low over the area before heading out the mouth of Ronas Voe. He reported that the aircraft passed close enough for the crew in the cockpit to be seen and that the German cross on the side of the aircraft was clearly visible. His parents warned him to remain indoors for fear that he might be shot at.

Allied military aircraft were also a regular sight in the area. Flying boats such as Consolidated Catalinas and Short Sunderlands, operating from a base at Sullom Voe, frequently passed over the area and occasionally landed in Ronas Voe.

== Aquaculture ==
As of 2019 there are 6 offshore aquaculture sites in Ronas Voe - 2 salmon farms administered by Scottish Sea Farms at Slocka and Pobie Sukka, and 4 long line common mussel farms administered by Blueshell Mussels at the Ayre of Teogs, the Clifts, and two at the head of the voe named Ronas Voe (North) and Ronas Voe (South). There is also a crab factory located at Skeo Head, which in 2013 was purchased and as of 2019 is run by a wholly owned subsidiary of Blueshell Mussels, Shetland Crab.

== Other ==
As of 2019 Ronas Voe is regularly used as a practice site for the Coastguard Search & Rescue helicopter, which often lands at the Loch of Shun.

Ronas Voe is a popular destination for canoeing and kayaking due to its relatively sheltered situation, its impressive cliffs and numerous sea caves on the west coast.

== Culture ==
Ronas Voe is the name of a traditional Shetland waltz tune composed by Ronnie Cooper. Often played in a set followed by Sunset over Foula, it is regularly played at functions and traditional dances throughout Shetland and the rest of Scotland, and is often used as the music for a St Bernard's Waltz.

Scenes shot in Ronas Voe briefly appeared in the Shetland TV series.

== Sources ==
- Anderson, Gordon (19 February 2019). "Episode 2". Shetland. Season 5. Episode 2. Event occurs at 16:54 - 17:49. BBC.
- Blaeu, Willem Janszoon; Blaeu, Joan (1654). Orcadum et Schetlandiae Insularum accuratissima descriptio [An accurate description of the Isles of Orkney and Shetland] (Map) (in Latin). Amsterdam: Blaeu. p. 139 – via National Library of Scotland.
- Brand, John (1809) [1701]. Pinkerton, John (ed.). A brief description of Orkney, Zetland, Pightland Firth, and Caithness, etc (In Pinkerton, John, Ed. A general collection of the best and most interesting voyages and travels). London. pp. 782. OCLC 1041608289. OL 13997155M.
- Brown, Jenny (1931). A crofter's life in Shetland (Motion picture). GPO Film Unit. Ronas Voe scenes at 0:01:58 - 0:02:55, 0:04:31 - 0:06:06, 0:25:48 - 0:29:25, 0:47:23 - 0:50:00, 0:51:02 - 0:54:06, 0:56:37 - 1:00:51. 0981 – via National Library of Scotland.
- Brooke-Freeman, Eileen (2010). Cox, Richard A.V.; Taylor, Simon (eds.). "Memories, Meids and Maps: the Shetland Place Names Project" (PDF). The Journal of Scottish Name Studies. 4. Perthshire: Clann Tuirc: 43–60. ISSN 1747-7387.
- Brown, Jenny (1932a). Scenes from a Shetland croft life (Motion picture). GPO Film Unit. 0980 – via National Library of Scotland.
- Brown, Jenny (1932b). In sheep's clothing (Motion picture). GPO Film Unit. 1129 – via National Library of Scotland.
- Brown, Jenny (1933). The rugged island; a Shetland lyric (Motion picture). GPO Film Unit. Event occurs at 0:02:18 - 0:02:59, 0:03:01 - 0:05:56, 0:06:35 - 0:07:37, 0:07:50 - 0:16:58, 0:18:11 - 0:19:45, 0:21:00 - 0:24:56, 0:29:30 - 0:33:13, 0:34:50 - 0:35:23, 0:38:20 - 0:42:03, 0:42:15 - 0:42:38, 0:45:50 - 0:46:37. 0991 – via National Library of Scotland.
- Bruce, John (1745). Nieuwe paskaard van Hitland met de daar Omleggende Eylanden na de Nieuwe Aftekening Gemaakt by den Lofwaarden en Onvermoeyden Hit en Zeeman Ian Bruyst, wonende op Whalsay te Sambisterhuys, de Afpeylinge en Zeylaagien in alle Baayen en Plaatzen zyn door hem zelfs gedaan en om der zelver Nuttigheyt int Licht gebragt diir Reinier en Josua Ottens Kaartverkopers te Amsterdam [New Shetland map with the surrounding islands, drawn by the praiseworthy and indefatigable Shetlander and seaman John Bruce, living in the isle of Whalsay at Symbister House, near the small sand bay, showing all the observations, gauges and sailing-routes in all bays and places there made by himself and for the sake of usefulness supports director Reinier and Josua Ottens map sellers in Amsterdam] (Map) (in Dutch). Shetland: Reinier en Josua Ottens Kaartverkopers te Amsterdam. p. 1 – via National Library of Scotland.
- Carter, Richard (19 March 1674). Report on the supply of victuals required... Kew: The National Archives. p. 1. ADM 106/297/21. Archived from the original on 17 June 2019. Alt URL
- Civico, Adam (24 May 2013). "Jobs saved as crab factory relocates to Northmavine". The Shetland Times.
- Collins, Greenvile (1693). The East Coast of Scotland with the Isles of Orkney and Shetland (Map). p. 1 – via National Library of Scotland.
- Dunn, Robert (1831). The ornithologist's guide to the islands of Orkney and Shetland (2 ed.). 31 George Street, Hull: Robert Dunn. OCLC 1050252106. OL 17084227M – via archive.org.
- Edmondston, Arthur (1809). A view of the ancient and present state of the Zetland islands. Vol. I. Edinburgh: John Ballantyne and Co. p. 5 – via Google Books.
- Gardner-Medwin, David (2011). Redfern, Chris; Patterson, Margaret; Littlewood, James; Williams, Joan (eds.). "William Chapman Hewitson's journal of a visit to Shetland in the summer of 1832" (PDF). Transactions of the Natural History Society of Northumbria. 71. Newcastle upon Tyne: Natural History Society of Northumbria: 131, 147.
- Gott, Tony, ed. (2014). "Gideon FRASER b. 1834 Hurdiback, Papa Stour, SHI, SCT d. 2 Apr 1867 'Diana', Ronas Voe, Northmavine, SHI, SCT: Shetland Family History". North Isles Family History (bayanne.info/Shetland). I45193.
- Gott, Tony, ed. (2016). "Hercules ANDERSON b. 20 Jun 1836 Tingwall, SHI, SCT d. 4 Apr 1867 Ronas Voe, Northmavine, SHI, SCT: Shetland Family History". North Isles Family History (bayanne.info/Shetland). I32058.
- Gott, Tony, ed. (2018). "Alexander ROBERTSON b. 7 Oct 1835 Grunifirth, Nesting, SHI, SCT d. 6 Apr 1867 Ronas Voe, Northmavine, SHI, SCT: Shetland Family History". North Isles Family History (bayanne.info/Shetland). I35059.
- Gray, Alan (15 July 2014). Bevington, Pete (ed.). "Whaling station research". Shetland News.
- Gray, Joseph (1991) [1933]. Lowrie: being a humorous account in the dialect of incidents in the life of a Shetland crofter (in Scots). Illustrated by F. S. Walterson (3rd ed.). Lerwick, Shetland: Shetland Times. p. 11. ISBN 0900662700. OCLC 26261290. "Bit dey wir aff laek speeders afore I cood win tae dem, an' is I booed me doon ta fire a bungle at dem, oot comes da "Wandot Pootra," screechin laek mad, an' da hidmist I saa o' her wis makkin for Runess Hill."
- Hall, Adrien; Fraser, Allen. "Glacial valley". www.landforms.eu.
- Hall, Adrien; Fraser, Allen. "Roches moutonnées". www.landforms.eu.
- Hamilton, N. E. S. A. (1868). The National gazetteer of Great Britain and Ireland. London: Virtue. p. 450. OCLC 2232712.
- Jack, William (1999) [1794]. Sinclair, Sir John (ed.). "Northmaven". The Statistical Account of Scotland Drawn up from the Communications of the Ministers of the Different Parishes. 12 (27). University of Edinburgh, University of Glasgow: Edinburgh: William Creech: 348. OCLC 1045293275 – via The Statistical Accounts of Scotland online service.
- Jakobsen, Jakob (1928) [1921]. An etymological dictionary of the Norn language in Shetland. Vol. 1. Printed by S. L. Møller, Copenhagen. Foreword by Anna Horsböl, née Jakobsen. Originally published in Danish as Etymologisk ordbog over det norröne sprog på Shetland. Reprinted Lerwick: The Shetland Folk Society, 1985. (1st ed.). Shaftesbury Avenue, London: David Nutt (A. G. Berry). p. 53 – via archive.org.
- Jakobsen, Jakob (1897). "The old Shetland place-names". The dialect and place names of Shetland; two popular lectures (Lecture). Cornell University Library. Lerwick: Lerwick, T. & J. Manson. p. 79. LCCN 03002186 – via archive.org.
- Johnson, Laureen (2015). Shetland's whaling tradition from Willafjord to Enderby Land. Smith, James C., Shetland ex-Whalers Association. Lerwick: The Shetland Times Ltd. pp. 12–20. ISBN 9780955778421. OCLC 941068842.
- Van Keulen, Gerard (1730). Het Eyland Hitland met Zyn onderhoorige Eylanden : Wort by de Engelsche Shetland genaamt [The island of Hitland with its subordinate islands named by the English Shetland] (Map) (in Dutch). Amsterdam: Johannes van Keulen. p. 1 – via National Library of Scotland.
- Van Keulen, Johannes (1682). Paskaart vande noord cust van Schotland als mede de eylanden van Hitlandt en Fero. Naaukeuring opgestelt en van veel fouten verbetert ... (Map) (in Dutch). Amsterdam: Johannes van Keulen. p. 1 – via National Library of Scotland.
- Main, Shona (2 June 2015). "Jenny Gilbertson: how she lived her life and got her shot". Jenny Gilbertson: a biography.
- Manson's Shetland Almanac and County Directory for 1892. Lerwick: T. & J. Manson. 1892. pp. 108–109. OCLC 1049675854 – via archive.org.
- Manson's Shetland Almanac and Directory for 1906. Lerwick: T. & J. Manson. 1906. p. 97. OCLC 1049692989 – via archive.org.
- Manson, Thomas Mortimer Yule (1933). Mansons' Guide to Shetland (3rd ed.). Lerwick: T. & J. Manson. OCLC 1007883604.
- Moll, Herman (1745). The Islands of Shetland / by H. Moll (Map). London: Bowles and Bowles. p. 1 – via National Library of Scotland.
- Mount, J; Page, T (1715). A new chart of the sea coast of Scotland with the islands thereof (Map). London: Mount & Page. p. 1 – via National Library of Scotland.
- Munch, Peter Andreas (1850). "Geographical elucidations of the Scottish and Irish local names occurring in the Sagas". Mémoires de la Société royale des antiquaires du nord. 1845–1849. Translated by G. Stephens. Copenhagen: 102, 109. OCLC 762490444 – via Google Books.
- Preston, Thomas (1781). A new hydrographical survey of the islands of Shetland (Map). London: R. Sayer and J. Bennett. p. 1 – via National Library of Scotland.
- Smith, Charles Edward (1867). "The race with death". In Harris, Charles Edward Smith (ed.). From the deep of the sea; being the diary of the late Charles Edward Smith, M.R.C.S., surgeon of the whale-ship Diana, of Hull (Diaries). 4, 5, and 6 Soho Square, London, W.1: A & C Black, Ltd. pp. 262–265. OCLC 2287106. OL 6728970W – via archive.org.
- Smith, Tom; Jex, Chris (2007). The Northern Isles: Orkney and Shetland Sea Kayaking. Caernarfon, Wales: Pesda Press. pp. 189–194. ISBN 9781906095000. OCLC 1023254263.
- Tayor, Marsali (7 February 2012). "Lights, camera, action… reestit mutton!". Shetland Life. The Shetland Times. Lerwick.
- Tønnessen, Johan Nicolay; Johnsen, Arne Odd (1 January 1982). The History of Modern Whaling. Translated by Christophersen, R. I. University of California Press. pp. 88–89. ISBN 9780520039735.
- Wilson, John Marius (1882). The Gazetteer of Scotland. National Library of Scotland. Edinburgh: W. & A. K. Johnston. pp. 390. OCLC 879560090. OL 25333660M.
- Young, Allen (1867). "Voyage of the "Diana" Whaler of Hull, in the years 1866-67". The Cornhill Magazine. Vol. 15. 65, Cornhill, London: Smith, Elder & Co. p. 760. OCLC 1565148.
- Various (28 March 2013). The Nautical Magazine and Naval Chronicle for 1867. Cambridge University Press. pp. 282–283.
- 6 Inch Name Book of Part of the Parishes of Northmaven & Delting Shetland. Shetland OS Name Books, 1877-1878. Vol. 18. Ordnance Survey. 1878. p. 126 – via ScotlandsPlaces.
- "A month's worth of rain in a day". Shetland News. 10 August 2014.
- "Ayre of Teogs". Scotland's Aquaculture. 4 October 2019.
- "Clifts Ronas Voe". Scotland's Aquaculture. 4 October 2019.
- "HEARD Hillswick Eshaness Area Regeneration and Development - Our History, Whaling". www.heard.shetland.co.uk. 2006.
- Heard Project - Shetland (20 July 2025) [2005]. "Jackie Edwardson". WW2 Home Front recall (Archival interview) (in Shetlandic). Interview of Jackie Edwardson. Interviewed by Pat Christie. 6:15 minutes in – via YouTube.
- "Hillswick - Heylor, North Roe and Isbister". shetland.org.
- "Londenden 3 April" [London 3 April]. Engelandt. Amsterdamsche Courant (in Dutch). No. 15. Amsterdam: Mattheus Cousart. 3 April 1674. p. 1 – via Delpher.
- "Pobie Sukka". Scotland's Aquaculture. 4 October 2019.
- "Ronas Voe (North)". Scotland's Aquaculture. 4 October 2019.
- "Ronas Voe (South)". Scotland's Aquaculture. 4 October 2019.
- Sanitary Survey Report - Ronas Voe (PDF) (Report). Cefas. 17 December 2009.
- "Shetland Islands Council - Ports and Harbours - Yachting". www.shetland.gov.uk.
- Shetland - Mainland North West (Map) (A1 ed.). 1:25000. Southampton: Ordnance Survey. 2007. § North Sheet. ISBN 9780319240052. OCLC 1043106388. Explorer Map 469.
- Shetland, Sheet XX (includes: Northmaven) (Map) (1 ed.). 1:10560. Southampton: Ordnance Survey. 1881. p. 1 – via National Library of Scotland.
- "Slocka Ronas Voe". Scotland's Aquaculture. 4 October 2019.
