= Lang Ayre =

Beach in the Shetland Islands of Scotland

- Beach
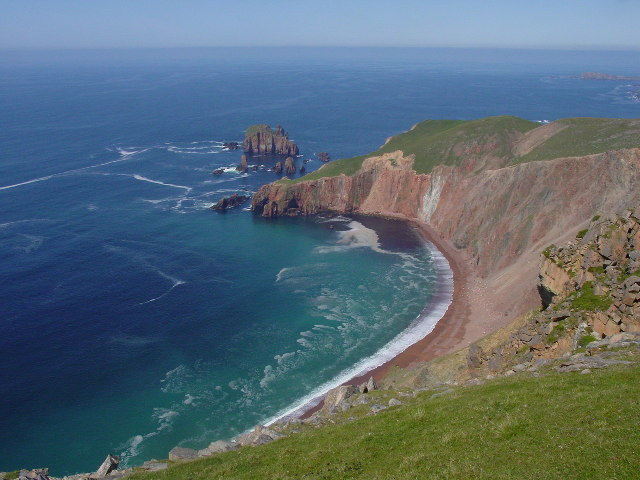
- Viewed from the top of Stonga Banks

- Location within Shetland
- Coordinates: 60°33′16″N 1°28′12″W
- Grid position: HU2985
- Part of: Ronas Hill
- Water bodies: Ronas Voe, Atlantic Ocean
- Geology: Red granite

Dimensions
  - Length: 1.0 kilometre (0.62 mi)

The Lang Ayre (Shaetlan pronunciation: [laŋ ˈeər] lang-AIR) is a beach on the west side of Ronas Hill, Northmavine, Shetland. At 1 kilometre (0.6 mi) in length it is the archipelago's longest. It is accessed either by a long walk from the top of Collafirth Hill down the Burn of Monius, or by sea. The beach's sand is red, eroded from the up to 700 feet (210 m) high red granite cliffs towering above it.

== Etymology ==
The name Lang Ayre comes from the Shetland dialect words lang (long) and ayre (shingle beach).

== Access ==
The Lang Ayre is situated north of the mouth of Ronas Voe, and is about 5 kilometres (3 mi) from the nearest road, so it is considered quite remote, even by Shetland standards. Many walkers visiting the beach also undertake a walk to the summit of 450 m (1,480 ft) Ronas Hill en route. The beach is most easily accessed on land by following the Burn of Monius down a steep-sided ravine east of Ketligill Head. The final descent down to the beach is aided by a rope which is left at the site for public use. The route most commonly taken to reach the Lang Ayre over Ronas Hill is prone to low-lying mist, so walkers are advised to be familiar with the use of a map and compass to be able to navigate back in poor visibility. The beach can also be accessed by sea, often by canoe or kayak, taking the most sheltered route via the Blade, Ronas Voe. The beach is directly exposed to the Atlantic Ocean, so westerly and north-westerly winds can be challenging to those small craft.

== Sources ==
- Hall, Adrien; Fraser, Allen. "Lang Ayre". www.landforms.eu.
- Dunn, Robert (1831). The ornithologist's guide to the islands of Orkney and Shetland (2 ed.). Hull: Robert Dunn (published 1837). pp. 39–40. OCLC 1050252106. OL 17084227M – via archive.org.
- Goodlad, Laurie (12 July 2019). "A guide to walking to the Lang Ayre, Northmavine". Shetland with Laurie. Archived from the original on 27 November 2021.
- Jakobsen, Jakob (1897). "The old Shetland place-names". The dialect and place names of Shetland; two popular lectures (Lecture). Cornell University Library. Lerwick: Lerwick, T. & J. Manson. p. 89. LCCN 03002186 – via archive.org.
- Manson, Thomas Mortimer Yule (1933). Mansons' Guide to Shetland (3rd ed.). Lerwick: T. & J. Manson. OCLC 1007883604.
- Smith, Tom; Jex, Chris (2007). The Northern Isles: Orkney and Shetland Sea Kayaking. Caernarfon, Wales: Pesda Press. pp. 189–194. ISBN 9781906095000. OCLC 1023254263.
- Uney, Graham (2016). Walking on the Orkney and Shetland Isles: 80 Walks in the Northern Isles (2 ed.). Cicerone Press. pp. 175–179. ISBN 978-1783623358. OCLC 942842573.
- "Shetland Islands Council - Ports and Harbours - Yachting". www.shetland.gov.uk.
