= Ayre (landform) =

Shingle beaches in Orkney and Shetland

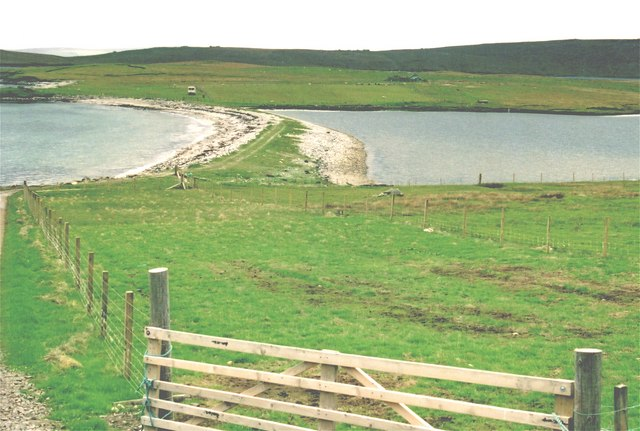
The Ness of Galtagarth is connected to the island of Yell by the Ayre of Galtigarth – a tombolo that separates the tidal Loch of Galtigarth (on the right) from the open sea

An ayre (Shaetlan pronunciation: [eər] AIR) is the name used for shingle beaches found in Orkney, Shetland, the Isle of Man, Lancashire, Cumbria and Northumbria. The word is derived from the Old Norse eyrr, meaning a shingle beach or gravelly place, and may be applied to ordinary beaches, cliff-foot beaches such as the Lang Ayre in Northmavine, Shetland, spits, bars or tombolos, but only if formed of shingle.

More than 130 such shingle beaches are named on Ordnance Survey maps of Shetland, but far fewer in Orkney, where most beaches are formed of sand. The word in its Old Norse form is common in Iceland, and it also occurs in a few place names in the north and west of the Scottish mainland which had a strong Norse influence, such as Eriboll ("a homestead on a shingle beach") and in the names of several shingle banks—Salt Ayre, Green Ayre, Stake Ayre, Rabbit Ayre and Whinny Ayre—in the tidal reach of the River Lune at Lancaster.

Churchill Barrier number 4 in Orkney used a shingle spit, the Ayre of Cara on South Ronaldsay, as its southern landfall. This ayre is still named on maps, despite having all but vanished under the causeway and the sand dunes that have accumulated on its eastern side.

The term "ayre" is sometimes wrongly applied to sand tombolos (e.g. St. Ninian's tombolo in Shetland) and to the lakes and lagoons impounded by bay-head bars, which are more properly called oyce in Orkney and houbs in Shetland.

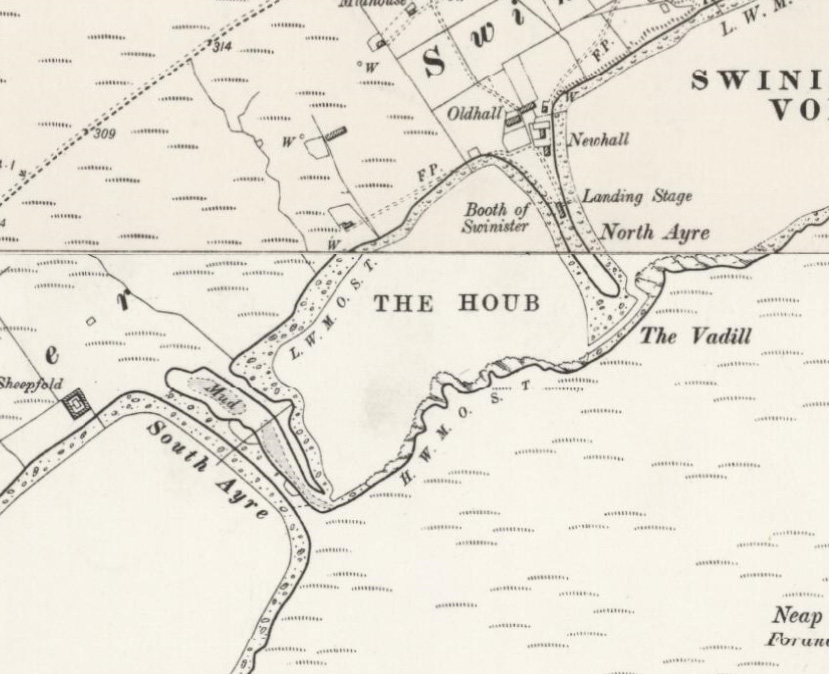
The Ayres of Swinister, Shetland: two ayres (shingle bars) that enclose a houb (lagoon)
