= Heylor =

Coordinates: 60.51°N 1.47°W

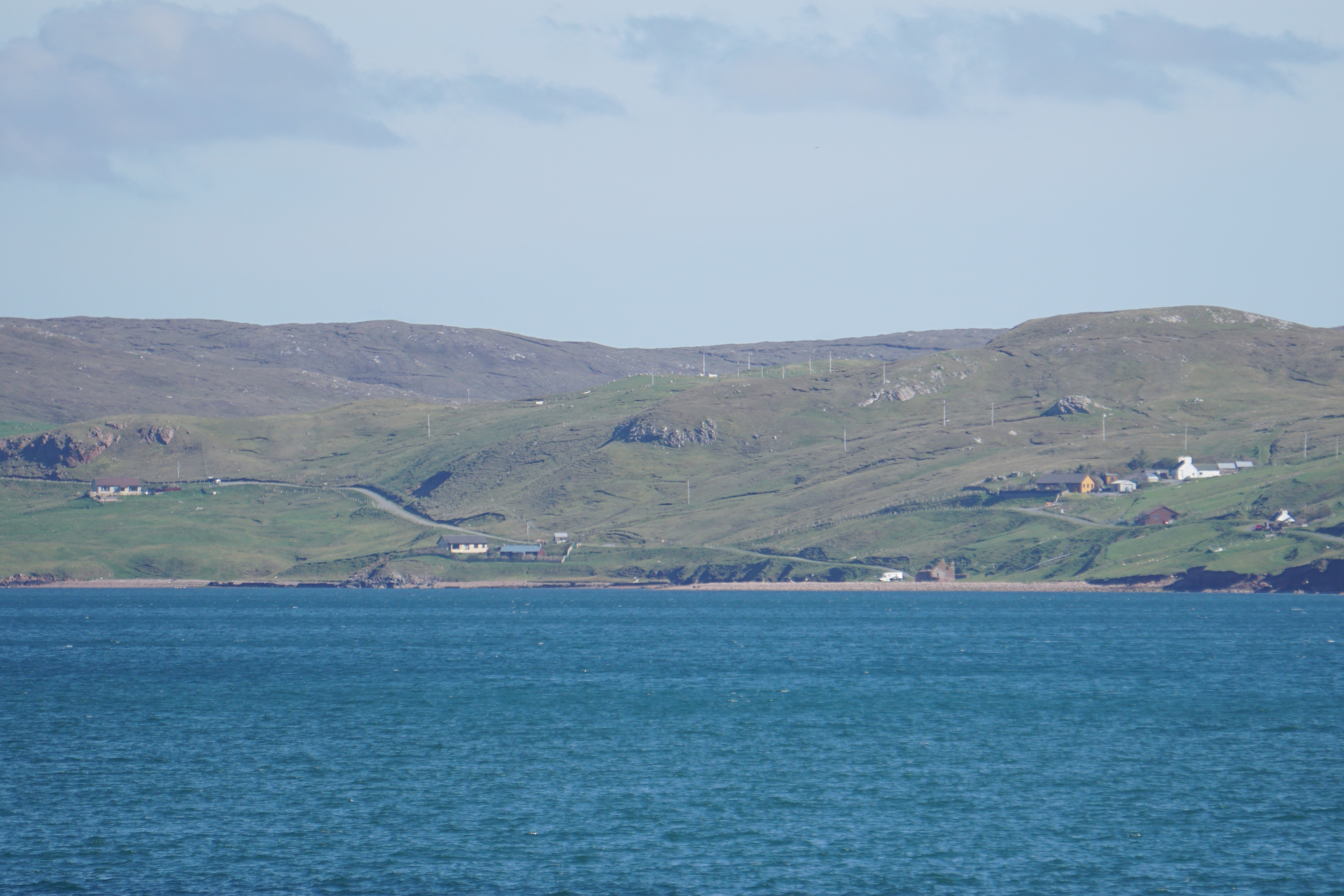
- Heylor, as seen from the abandoned fishing lodges, Ronas Voe

- Location within Shetland
- Language: Shetland Dialect
- OS grid reference: HU291808
  - Edinburgh: 321 mi (517 km) SSW
  - London: 624 mi (1,004 km) S
- Civil parish: Northmavine
- Council area: Shetland
- Lieutenancy area: Shetland
- Country: Scotland
- Sovereign state: United Kingdom
- Post town: SHETLAND
- Postcode district: ZE2
- Dialling code: 01806
- Police: Scotland
- Fire: Scottish
- Ambulance: Scottish
- UK Parliament: Orkney and Shetland
- Scottish Parliament: Shetland

Heylor (Shaetlan pronunciation: ['he̞lər] HELL-ər) is a settlement situated on the south side of Ronas Voe in Northmavine, Shetland, Scotland. It lies directly opposite Ronas Hill, Shetland's tallest mountain.

== Etymology ==
The name Heylor comes from the Old Norse hellir meaning cave or cavern, of which there are several (most only accessible by sea) on the west side of Ronas Voe.

== History ==
One of the earliest mentions of Heylor could be in a document describing the division of Hans Sigurdson's property in 1490, by which it is referred to as Heleland. Heylor also appears in a 1545 document confirming an agreement in an older 1516 document stipulating the transfer of land between Udal landowners. Heelle is believed to refer to Heylor.

Norse	English Translation
Allom godom mannom thenam som thette breff Hendhr fforr atth Komma Helssom wij effthrschriffne Mendt Niels willomssonn lauggmandt wdj hieltlandt Tomes Rigadzonn Mag[n]us Jonsszonn Tomes Engusszonn Indbÿgge ÿ samme landhe Kierlige medt gude Kunnochgorend atth anno dñi M. D. och xvj Mandagenn nesthann fforr Gregorij war wij fforsamledhe paa eydÿe y eystingom ÿ ffornefnde lande Atth gierde eÿth wenlügt och skellügt bÿtthe Mellom Niels tommesszonn och Margrette sanders dott Alexander tomesszonn skolgetinn dotthr och arffua ÿ sodauna Maathe ath fforrnemffne Niels tomeszonn kom ffor oss ÿ fulle och lauglgs wmbodhe sielffzins paa Eÿno Halfuo, Enn paa andre halfuo Torwaldt Hendrichsszonn ÿ fullo wmbodhe ffornefndhe Margrette dott dotthr synna waar thaa thett ffullkommelige samtÿck och medt ffullo jaaorddhe stadffest erffwingianna emellom atth ffornēfde Niels tomessonn skulle haffue ÿ fforneffde Eyde xx mercker brendhe och x mercker ÿ westhri brecko, enn forneffdhe Margret Sanderss dott lottnast ÿ hennar parth igenn xij mercker ÿ Heelle som hennarh ffader Koÿss siig ffor Hóffuidt bólle y fullo wiide sÿno paa Retta syuanda dag med synna [ ? ] stett och waar ffornefnde Sander elsthe brodhr, Ther ffor eige handseg ffiorsthe wilkor och skall thaa taga andra jarder och leggia Indtill Hóffuidt bólle och giora thet jamgodt som Eyde aat marke talle och haffue the paa badhe sÿger samtÿck thett biótte, atth wbrideligen geld skall till evindelig tiid. Tüll sandende her wm tryckom wij fforschreffne mendt worr Indsigle nedhenn ffor thette breff som schreffuedt er aar och dag som fforr staar	To all good men into whose hands this letter may come, we the afterwritten men, Niels Willomson, lawman in Hieltland (Note: Hieltland is Shetland), Tomes Rigadzonn, Mag[n]us Jonsson, and Tomes Engusson, inhabitant of the same land, send a hearty greeting in God; making known that we were gathered together at Eydye, (Note: Eydye is Aith) in Eysting (Note: Eysting is Aithsting) in the aforesaid land, a. a 1516, the Monday next before [the feast of St] Gregory, that we made a friendly and just exchange between Niels Tomesson and Margrette Sanders daughter, the lawfully born daughter and heiress of Alexander Tomesson, in such manner, that the said Neils Tomesson, on the one part, came before us with full and lawful powers for himself, and on the other part, Toreualdt Hendrichson, with full powers on behalf of this Margaret, his daughter's daughter. Then an agreement was made, and it was confirmed, with full consent, among the heirs, that the said Niels Tomesson should have twenty merks (Note: A merk was a denomination of land used in Orkney and Shetland tied to its value rather than its size. One merk of cultivated land would be smaller in size than one merk of uncultivated land. One merk of land was tied to the value of a certain amount of refined silver also known as a merk.) burnt [of silver] in Eyde, and ten merks in West Brecka; but the said Margret Sanders daughter should get for her share in return twelve merks in Heelle, which her father chose for himself as a Head Bull, while in full possession of his faculties, on the right seventh day with his [ ? ]. And the said Sander was the oldest brother, and had therefore the first choice. And the other lands are to be taken and laid under the Head Bull, and it is to be made equally good as Eyde, according to the number of merks; and this exchange has been consented to on both sides that it shall be valid and inviolable everlastingly. In confirmation of this, we, the above-written men, impress our seals underneath this letter, which is written year and day as above.

There used to be a post office in Heylor, which gives rise to the fact that many residences several miles away from Heylor still retain Heylor in their postal addresses.

== Sources ==
- Goudie, Gilbert (14 January 1878). "Notice of two charters in the Norse language, found among the papers of the sheriff-court of Shetland". Proceedings of the Society of Antiquaries of Scotland. XII. Translation by Jón A. Hjaltalin. Neill and Company: 472-492 – via archive.org.
- Jakobsen, Jakob (1897). "The old Shetland place-names". The dialect and place names of Shetland; two popular lectures (Lecture). Cornell University Library. Lerwick: Lerwick, T. & J. Manson. p. 100. LCCN 03002186 – via archive.org.
- Post Office Guide. London: William Clowes & Sons. 1914. p. 312.
