= Johan Nicolay Tønnessen =

Norwegian historian and schoolteacher

Johan Nicolay Tønnessen (30 November 1901 – 27 December 1987) was a Norwegian historian and schoolteacher.

He was born in Kristiansand as a son of port magistrate Joh. E. Tønnessen and Ida, née Stray. He finished his secondary education in 1920 and took the cand.philol. degree at the Royal Frederick University in 1928, majoring in history and minoring in French and Latin. He also took pedagogy in 1926 and was a substitute at Trondhjem Cathedral School from 1927 to 1928. In 1928 he married Lulla Evensen; they had two daughters and one son.

He was a teacher at Gjøvik Upper Secondary School from 1928 to 1935 and Grefsen Upper Secondary School from 1935 to 1959. In Gjøvik he was elected to the city council in the 1934 Norwegian local elections. He represented the Fascist party Nasjonal Samling, which with 10.9% of the vote had its third most successful city election in Gjøvik. Moving to Oslo, he did not finish the term. He became a member of the school board and deputy member of the municipal council of Aker.

During the occupation of Norway by Nazi Germany, when Nasjonal Samling was actually propelled to power as a collaborationist party, Tønnessen was arrested by the authorities in August 1943 for resistance work. He was imprisoned in Bredtveit concentration camp until November, then in Møllergata 19, then from April to October 1944 at Akershus Fortress, and ultimately in Grini concentration camp until the war's end.

Tønnessen later took the dr.philos. degree in history, and issued the books Ole Nielsen (Aalgaard) og hans slekt (1953), Kaperfart og skipsfart 1807–1814 (1955), Porsgrunns historie (two volumes in 1956 and 1957). He contributed to Den norske sjøfarts historie (1951), Den moderne hvalfangst historie (1968–1970) and the third volume of Kristiansands historie (1974). His specialties were shipping, privateering, whaling and town history.
