= Ronas Hill =

Mountain in the United Kingdom

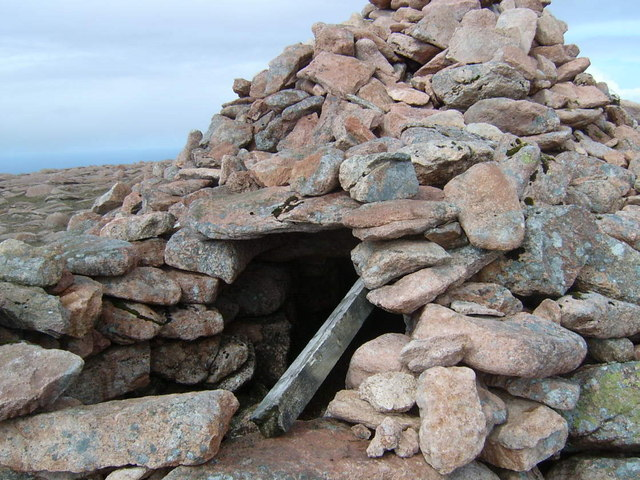
- The chambered cairn on the summit of Ronas Hill

Highest point
- Elevation: 450 m (1,480 ft)
- Prominence: 450 m (1,480 ft)
- Listing: Marilyn, Scottish Council area top (Shetland) Scottish county top (Shetland)
- Coordinates: 60.53393°N 1.44605°W

Naming
- English translation: stony ground or scree
- Language of name: Norse

Geography
- Location within Shetland
- Location: Shetland, Scotland
- OS grid: HU305835
- Topo map: OS Landranger 3

Ramsar Wetland
- Official name: Ronas Hill - North Roe & Tingon
- Designated: 11 August 1997
- Reference no.: 916

Ronas Hill (or Rönies Hill) is a hill in Shetland, Scotland. It is classed as a Marilyn, and is the highest point in the Shetland Islands at an elevation of 450 m (1,480 ft). A Neolithic chambered cairn is located near the summit.

== Location ==
Ronas Hill (Old Norse: rön, meaning stony ground or scree) is on the Northmavine peninsula of Mainland, Shetland, at HU305835. The Norse name certainly describes the hilltop. Ronas Hill also gives its name to Ronas Voe, which it sits adjacent to. On a clear day, much of Shetland can be seen from the summit. It looks over Yell Sound, the North Sea, across to the Atlantic Ocean and even the highest points of Fair Isle.

== Flora and fauna ==
Ronas Hill is a Ramsar site, containing many rare Arctic plants. Peculiarly for Shetland, there are several species of woodland fungi, notably ceps and chanterelles, which normally grow on the roots of deciduous trees (notable by their absence on Ronas Hill). Here, they are associated with creeping willow, which grows extensively on the hill.

The hill forms part of the Ronas Hill – North Roe and Tingon Important Bird Area (IBA), designated as such by BirdLife International because it supports a suite of moorland-breeding birds, including red-throated loons, great skuas and merlins.

== Chambered cairn ==
On top of the hill, there is a Neolithic chambered cairn, unusual for its position on top of a hill. Most surviving Neolithic British cairns are sited in prominent places, but not generally on the top of taller hills. According to local farmers, until the construction of Sullom Voe Terminal in the mid-1970s, the cairn contained a variety of "sacrifice" items, such as coins (some "very old") and other items. Before that time, Ronas Hill would have been far off the beaten track.

Ronas Hill cairn shows evidence of substantial rebuilding of its upper structure, as evidenced by the lack of lichen on stones above the entry passage and main cyst. The current peak of pink granite stones is clearly visible from the valley below and may have been raised in height to serve as a "mede" or fishing mark in past centuries. The cairn was certainly altered by soldiers during a military exercise in the 1960s, when a wall was built around its entrance to turn it into a foxhole.
