= Government in medieval Scotland =

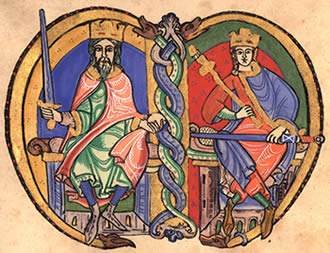
David I, whose introduction of feudalism into Scotland would have a profound impact on the government of the kingdom, and his heir Malcolm IV

Government in medieval Scotland, includes all forms of politics and administration of the minor kingdoms that emerged after the departure of the Romans from central and southern Britain in the fifth century, through the development and growth of the combined Scottish and Pictish kingdom of Alba into the kingdom of Scotland, until the adoption of the reforms of the Renaissance in the fifteenth century.

Kingship was the major form of political organisation in the early Middle Ages, with competing minor kingdoms and fluid relationships of over- and under-kingdoms. The primary function of these kings was as war leaders, but there were also ritual elements to kingship, evident in ceremonies of coronation. The Kingdom of Alba, which emerged from the unification of the Scots and Picts in the tenth century, retained some of these ritual aspects, most obviously in the coronation ceremony at Scone. While the Scottish monarchy remained a largely itinerant institution, Scone remained one of its most important locations, with royal castles at Stirling and Perth becoming significant in the later Middle Ages before Edinburgh developed as a capital in the second half of the fifteenth century. The Scottish crown grew in prestige throughout the era and adopted the conventional offices of western European courts and later elements of their ritual and grandeur.

In the early period, the kings of the Scots depended on the great lords of the mormaers (later earls) and Toísechs (later thanes), but from the reign of David I, sheriffdoms were introduced, which allowed more direct control and gradually limited the power of the major lordships. While modern knowledge of early systems of law is limited, royal justice can be seen as developing from the twelfth century onwards with local sheriff, burgh, manorial and ecclesiastical courts and offices of the justicar to oversee administration. The Scots common law began to develop in this period, and there were attempts to systematise and codify the law and the beginnings of an educated professional body of lawyers. In the late Middle Ages, major institutions of government including the King's Council and Parliament developed. The Council emerged as a full-time body in the fifteenth century, increasingly dominated by laymen and critical to the administration of justice. Parliament also emerged as a major legal institution, gaining an oversight of taxation and policy. By the end of the era it was sitting almost every year, partly because of the frequent minorities and regencies of the period, which may have prevented it from being sidelined by the monarchy.

== Kingship ==
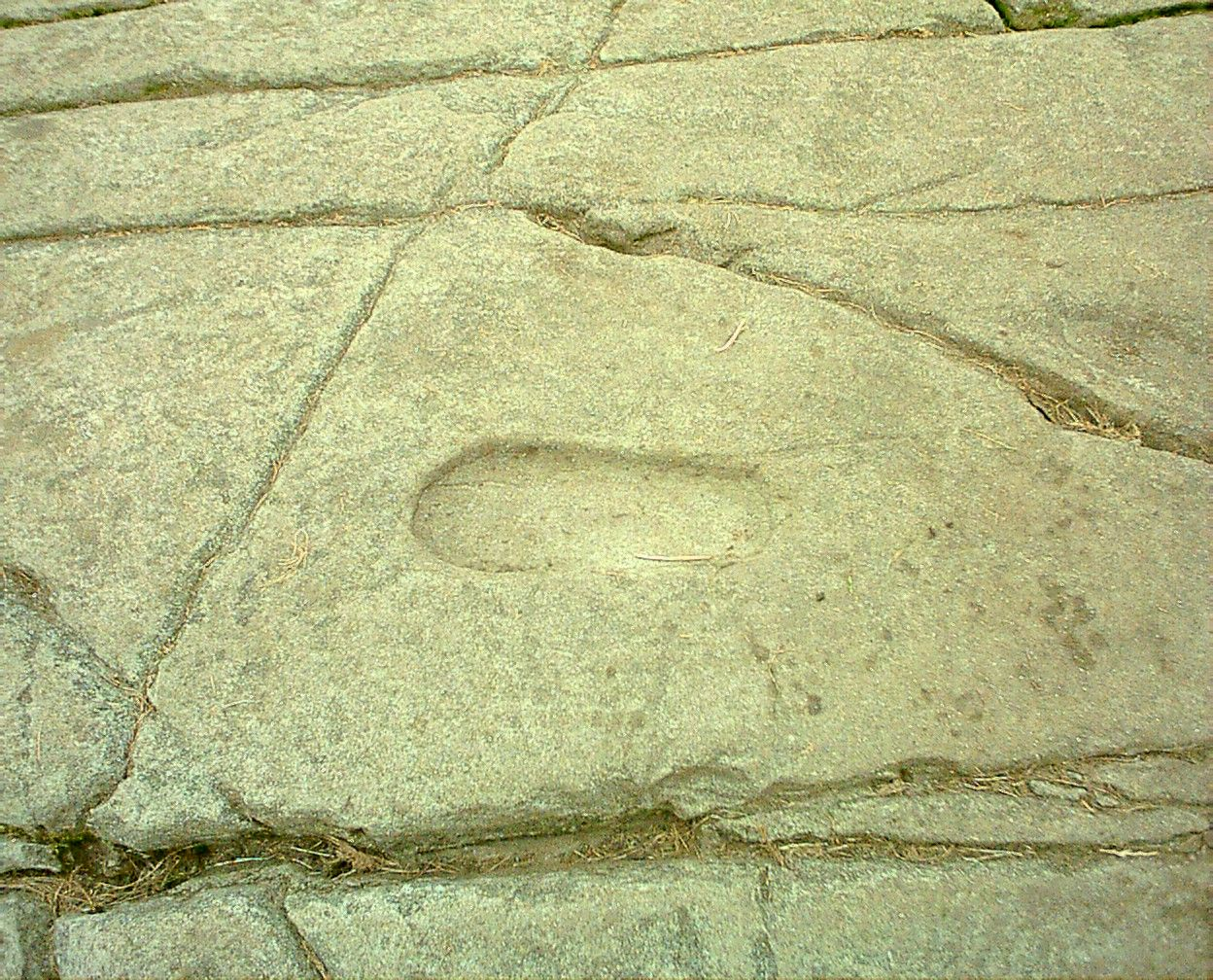
Footprint used in king-making ceremonies at Dunadd

In the early medieval period, with its many competing kingdoms within the modern boundaries of Scotland, kingship was not inherited in a direct line from the previous king. A candidate for kingship usually needed to be a member of a particular dynasty and to claim descent from a particular ancestor. Kingship could be multi-layered and very fluid. The Pictish kings of Fortriu were probably acting as overlords of other Pictish kings for much of this period and occasionally were able to assert an overlordship over non-Pictish kings, but sometimes had to acknowledge the overlordship of external rulers, both Anglian and British. Such relationships may have included obligations to pay tribute or to supply armed forces. In victory subordinate rulers may have received rewards in return. Interaction and intermarriage into subject kingdoms may have opened the way to absorption of such sub-kingdoms and, although there might be later overturnings of such annexation, it is likely that kingship was being gradually monopolised by a handful of the most powerful dynasties.

The primary role of a king was to act as a war leader, reflected in the very small number of minorities or female reigning monarchs in the period. Kings organised the defence of their people's lands, property and persons and negotiated with other kings to secure these things. If they failed to do so, the settlements might be raided, destroyed or annexed and the populations killed or taken into slavery. Kings also engaged in the low-level warfare of raiding and the more ambitious full-scale warfare that led to conflicts of large armies and alliances and which could be undertaken over relatively large distances, like the expedition to Orkney by Dál Riata in 581 or the Northumbrian attack on Ireland in 684.

Kingship had its ritual aspects. The Scottish kings of Dál Riata were inaugurated by putting their foot in a footprint in stone, signifying that they would follow in the footsteps of their predecessors. The Kingdom of Alba, unified in the ninth century and which would develop into the kingdom of Scotland, had Scone and its sacred stone at the heart of its coronation ceremony, which historians presume was inherited from Pictish practice, but which was claimed to date back to the first arrival of the Scottish kings from Ireland. It was here that Scottish kings before the wars of independence were crowned, on the Stone of Scone, before its removal by Edward I in 1296. The first ceremony for which details survive is that for Alexander III in 1249. They describe a ceremony that combined elements of ancient heritage, the Church and secular lordship. He was consecrated by the Bishop of St Andrews and placed on the throne by the Mormaers of Strathearn and Fife and his genealogy recited in Gaelic back to his Dalriadric Scottish ancestors by a royal poet from the Highlands. There was no anointment or crowning ceremony, as was common elsewhere in Europe. Later kings seem to have resented this omission and attempted to remedy it by appeals to the Pope. However, Scottish kings are usually depicted wearing crowns and carrying the normal regalia associated with kingship.

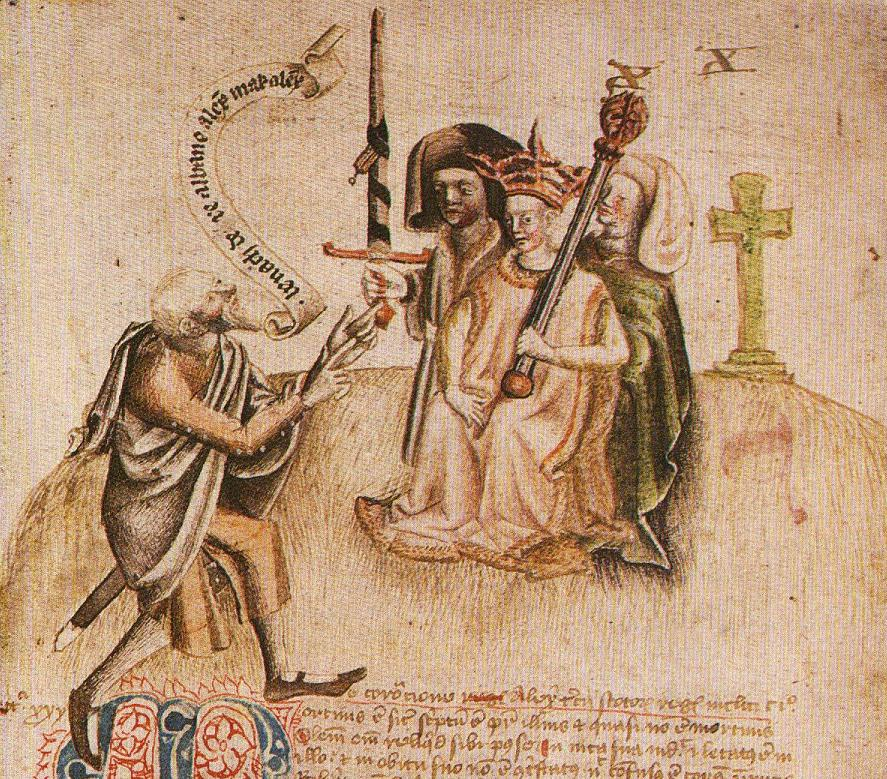
Coronation of Alexander III on Moot Hill, Scone. Beside him are the Mormaers of Strathearn and Fife, while his genealogy is recited by a royal poet.

For most of the medieval era, the king was itinerant and had no "capital" as such. David I (r. 1124–53) tried to build up Roxburgh as a royal centre, but in the twelfth and thirteenth centuries, more charters were issued at Scone than any other location. Other popular locations in the early part of the era were nearby Perth, Stirling, Dunfermline and Edinburgh. In the later Middle Ages the king moved between royal castles, particularly Perth and Stirling, but also holding judicial sessions throughout the kingdom, with Edinburgh only beginning to emerge as the capital in the reign of James III at the cost of considerable unpopularity. The unification of the kingdom, the spread of Anglo-Norman custom, the development of a European trading economy and Robert I's success in achieving independence from England did much to build up the prestige of the institution.

Like most western European monarchies, the Scottish crown in the fifteenth century adopted the example of the Burgundian court, through formality and elegance putting itself at the centre of culture and political life, defined with display, ritual and pageantry, reflected in elaborate new palaces and patronage of the arts. Renaissance ideas began to influence views on government, described as New or Renaissance monarchy, which emphasised the status and significance of the monarch. The Roman Law principle that "a king is emperor in his own kingdom" can be seen in Scotland from the mid-fifteenth century. In 1469 Parliament passed an act that declared that James III possessed "full jurisdiction and empire within his realm". From the 1480s the king's image on his silver groats showed him wearing a closed, arched, imperial crown, in place of the open circlet of medieval kings, probably the first coin image of its kind outside of Italy. It soon began to appear in heraldry, on royal seals, manuscripts, sculptures and the steeples of churches with royal connections, as at St. Giles Cathedral, Edinburgh. The first Scottish monarch to actually wear such a crown was James V, whose diadem was reworked to include arches in 1532. They were re-added when it was reconstructed in 1540 and this remains the Crown of Scotland. The idea of imperial monarchy emphasised the dignity of the crown and included its role as a unifying national force, defending national borders and interest, royal supremacy over the law and a distinctive national church within the Catholic communion. New Monarchy can also be seen in the reliance of the crown on "new men" rather than the great magnates, the use of the clergy as a form of civil service, and the development of standing armed forces and a navy.

== Court ==
The seal of Walter fitz Alan (1106–77), the first hereditary royal stewart

Little is known about the structure of the Scottish royal court in the period before the reign of David I, but by the late thirteenth century, it had taken on a distinctly feudal character. The major offices were the steward or stewart, chamberlain, constable, marischal and chancellor. The office of stewart, responsible for management of the king's household, was created by David I and given as an hereditary office to Walter fitz Alan, whose descendants became the House of Stewart. The office was merged with the crown when Robert II inherited the throne.

The other major secular posts also had a tendency to become hereditary, with the chamberlain responsible for royal finances and the constable for organising the crown's military forces, while the marishchal had a leadership role in battle. The chancellor, who was usually a clergyman, had charge of the king's chapel, which was also the major administrative centre of the crown, and had control of the letters, legal writs and seals. Under him were various posts, usually filled by clerics, including the custodian of the great seal. There were also lesser posts, some of which were Gaelic in origin, including senior clerks of the Provend and the Liverence, in charge of the distribution of food, and the Hostarius (later Usher or "Doorward"), who was in charge of the royal bodyguard.

== King's council ==
After the crown, the most important government institution in the late Middle Ages was the king's council, composed of the king's closest advisers. Unlike its counterpart in England, the king's council in Scotland retained legislative and judicial powers. It was relatively small, with normally less than 10 members in a meeting, some of whom were nominated by parliament, particularly during the many minorities of the era, as a means of limiting the power of a regent.

The council was a virtually full-time institution by the late fifteenth century, and surviving records from the period indicate it was critical in the working of royal justice. Nominally members of the council were some of the great magnates of the realm, but they rarely attended meetings. Most of the active members of the council for most of the late Medieval Period were career administrators and lawyers, almost exclusively university-educated clergy. The most successful of these moved on to occupy the major ecclesiastical positions in the realm as bishops and, towards the end of the period, archbishops. By the end of the fifteenth century, this group was being joined by increasing numbers of literate laymen, often secular lawyers, of which the most successful gained preferment in the judicial system and grants of lands and lordships. From the reign of James III onwards, the clerically dominated post of Lord Chancellor was increasingly taken by leading laymen.

== Parliament ==
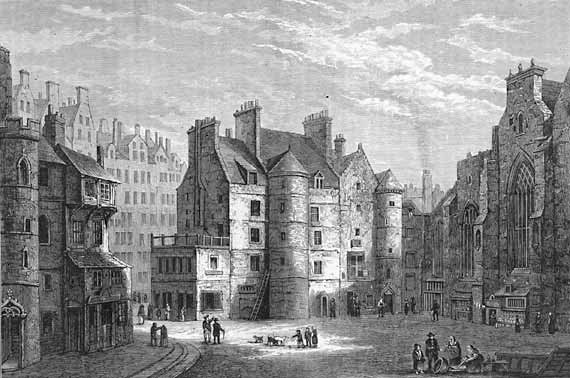
The Old Tolbooth, Edinburgh, usual location of Scottish parliaments from 1438 to 1560

After the council, the next most important body in the process of government at the end of the era was parliament, which had evolved by the late thirteenth century from the King's Council of Bishops and Earls into a 'colloquium' with a political and judicial role. By the early fourteenth century, the attendance of knights and freeholders had become important, and probably from 1326 burgh commissioners joined them to form the Three Estates, meeting in a variety of major towns throughout the kingdom. It acquired significant powers over particular issues, including consent for taxation, but it also had a strong influence over justice, foreign policy, war, and other legislation, whether political, ecclesiastical, social or economic. Under Robert I, the importance of the parliament grew as he called them more frequently and its composition shifted to include more representation from the burghs and lesser landowners. In 1399, a General Council established that the King should hold a parliament at least once a year for the next three years, so "that his subjects are served by the law".

From the early 1450s, a great deal of the legislative business of the Scottish parliament was usually carried out by a parliamentary committee known as the 'Lords of the Articles', chosen by the three estates to draft legislation that was then presented to the full assembly to be confirmed. Before the sixteenth century, parliamentary business was also carried out by 'sister' institutions, including the General Council and the Convention of Estates. These bodies could deal with taxation, legislation and policy-making, but lacked the ultimate authority of a full parliament. In the fifteenth century, parliament was being called on an almost annual basis, more often than its English counterpart, and was willing to offer occasional resistance or criticism to the policies of the crown, particular in the unpopular reign of James III. However, from about 1494, after his success against the Stewarts and Douglases and over rebels in 1482 and 1488, James IV managed largely to dispense with the institution, and it might have declined, like many other systems of Estates in continental Europe, had it not been for his death in 1513 and another long minority.

== Law ==
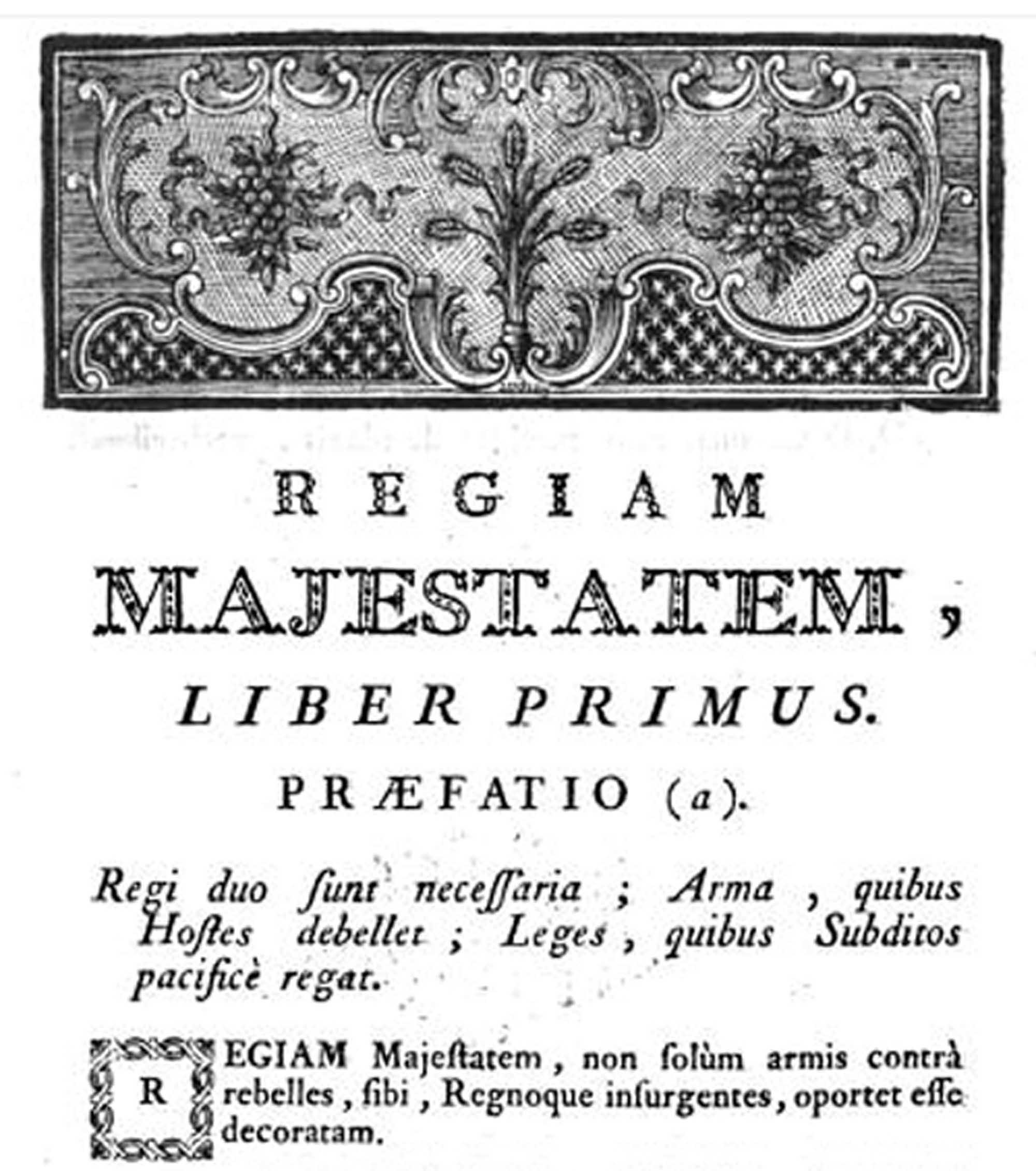
The Regiam Majestatem is the oldest surviving written digest of Scots law.

Present-day knowledge of the nature of Scots law before the eleventh century is largely speculative, with no surviving law codes from Scotland in this period, but it was probably a mixture of different legal traditions representing the different cultures inhabiting the land at the time, including British, Irish and Anglo-Saxon customs. The legal tract known as Laws of the Brets and Scots, probably compiled in the reign of David I, set out a system of compensation for injury and death based on ranks and the solidarity of kin groups. There were popular courts, the comhdhail, indicated by dozens of place names throughout eastern Scotland. In Scandinavian-held areas Udal law formed the basis of the legal system and it is known that the Hebrides were taxed using the Ounceland measure. Althings were open-air governmental assemblies that met in the presence of the jarl, and the meetings were open to virtually all free men. At these sessions decisions were made, laws passed and complaints adjudicated. Examples include Tingwall and Law Ting Holm in Shetland, Dingwall in Easter Ross, and Tynwald on the Isle of Man.

The introduction of feudalism in the reign of David I had a profound impact on the development of Scots law, establishing feudal land tenure over many parts of the south and east, which eventually spread northward. Sheriffs—originally appointed by the King as royal administrators and tax collectors—developed legal functions, and as early as 1214, they were holding court to hear a variety of cases. Feudal lords were also normally permitted to hold court where disputes between their tenants, including criminal matters, were adjudicated. By the fourteenth century, some of these feudal courts had developed into "petty kingdoms" where the King's courts did not have authority, except for cases of treason. Burghs, towns which had been given this special status usually by the King, also had their own set of local laws dealing mostly with commercial and trade matters and may have become similar in function to sheriff's courts.

Ecclesiastical courts also played an important role in Scotland as they had exclusive jurisdiction over matters such as marriage, contracts made on oath, inheritance and legitimacy. These courts, unlike their lay counterparts, were generally staffed by educated men who were trained in both Roman and Canon law and offered a more sophisticated form of justice. Judices were often royal officials who supervised baronial, abbatial and other lower-ranking "courts". However, the main official of law in the post-Davidian Kingdom of the Scots was the Justiciar who held courts and reported to the king personally. Normally, there were two Justiciarships, organised by linguistic boundaries: the Justiciar of Scotia and the Justiciar of Lothian, but sometimes Galloway also had its own Justiciar. Scottish common law, the ius commune, began to take shape at the end of the period, assimilating Gaelic and Celtic law with practices from Anglo-Norman England and the Continent.

During the period of English control over Scotland, there is some evidence to suggest that King Edward I attempted to abolish Scottish laws that were contrary to English law, as he had done in Wales. Under Robert I in 1318, a parliament at Scone enacted a code of law that drew upon older practices, but it was also dominated by current events and focused on military matters and the conduct of the war. Nevertheless, the act also codified procedures for criminal trials and protections for vassals from ejection from the land. From the fourteenth century, there are surviving examples of early Scottish legal literature, such as the Regiam Majestatem (on procedure at the royal courts) and the Quoniam Attachiamenta (on procedure at the baron courts), which drew on both common and Roman law.

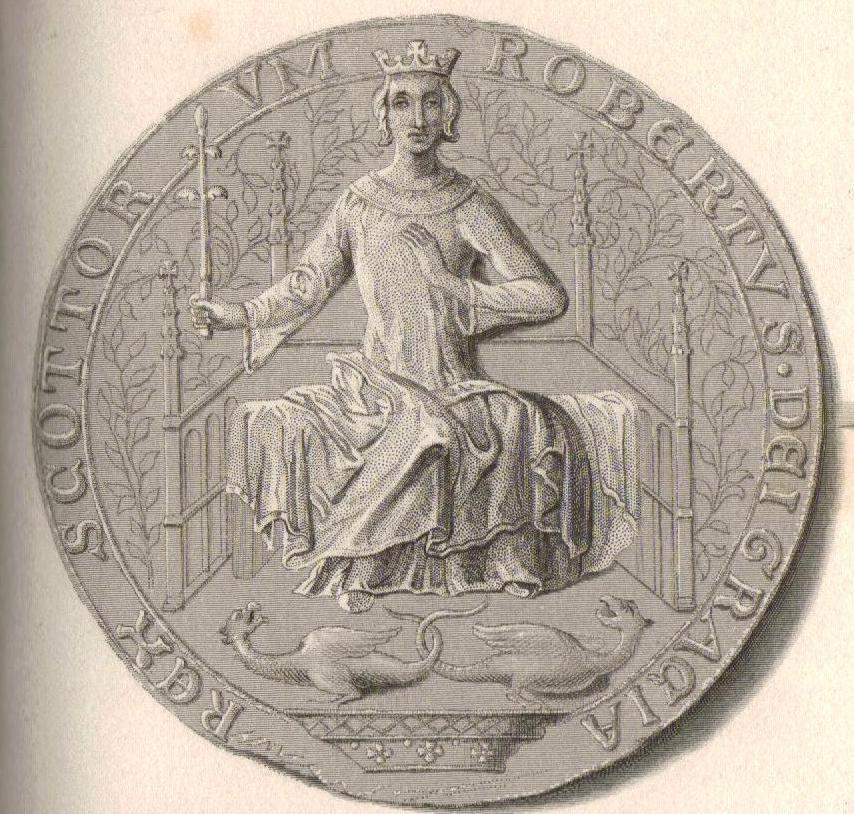
An engraving of Robert II depicted enthroned as a lawgiver on his great seal

The Stewart dynasty, founded by King Robert II in 1371, was defined by the growing authority and power of the Scottish Kings in matters of law and the development of existing legal institutions. In 1469, the parliament of Scotland affirmed the ultimate authority of James III and rejected the authority of imperial notaries in Scottish civil matters. The recognition of the sovereign authority of the Scottish Kings was connected to the influence of the common law in Scots law. Customary laws, such as the Law of Clan MacDuff, came under attack from the Stewart Dynasty, which consequently extended the reach of Scots common law.

From the reign of King James I, the beginnings of a legal profession began to develop and the administration of criminal and civil justice was centralised. The growing activity of the parliament and the centralisation of administration in Scotland called for the better dissemination of acts of the parliament to the courts and other enforcers of the law. Throughout the late fifteenth century, unsuccessful attempts were made to form commissions of experts to codify, update or define Scots law. The legal uncertainty that this situation created prompted increased reliance on the common law found in Canon law, and there are a number of examples of statutes from this period that clearly drew from Roman law. The general practice during this period, as evidenced from records of cases, seems to have been to defer to specific Scottish laws on a matter when available and to fill in any gaps with provisions from the common law embodied in Civil and Canon law, which had the advantage of being written.

The study of law was popular in Scotland, and many students travelled to Continental Europe to study canon law and civil law. Scotland advanced markedly in educational terms during the fifteenth century with the founding of the University of St Andrews in 1413, the University of Glasgow in 1450 and the University of Aberdeen in 1495, and with the passing of the Education Act 1496, which required those who administered justice in Scotland to learn Latin and study law for at least three years at school.

== Local government ==
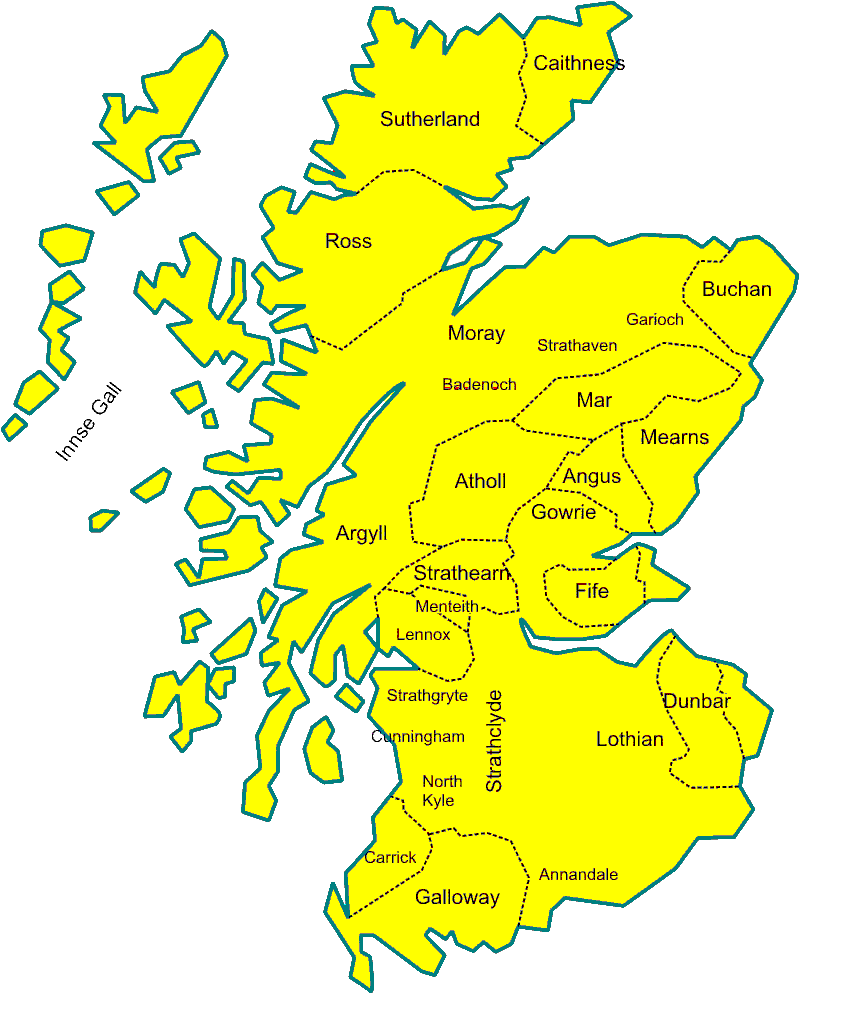
Map of mormaer and other lordships in Medieval Scotland, c. 1230

The relative poverty of the kingdom, difficult terrain and the lack of a system of regular taxation, helped to limit the scale of central administration and government by the Scottish crown. Before the twelfth century, the king "delegated" power to hereditary native "officers" such as the Mormaers/Earls and Toísechs/Thanes. In the Norman period, sheriffs and, to a lesser extent, bishops, became increasingly important. The former enabled the King to effectively administer royal demesne land. During David I's reign, royal sheriffs had been established in the king's core personal territories; at Roxburgh, Scone, Berwick-upon-Tweed, Stirling and Perth. By the reign of William I, there may have been about 30 royal sheriffdoms, including ones at Ayr and Dumfries, key locations on the borders of Galloway-Carrick. By the end of the thirteenth century, sheriffdoms had been established in westerly locations as far-flung as Wigtown, Kintyre, Skye and Lorne. This meant that, particularly in the lowlands, the crown was now able to administer government through the system of sheriffdoms and other appointed officers, rather than semi-independent lordships.

Until the fifteenth century, the ancient pattern of major lordships survived largely intact, with the addition of two new "scattered earldoms" of Douglas and Crawford, thanks to royal patronage after the wars of independence, mainly in the borders and south-west. The Stewarts emerged as the dominant kindred and came to control many of the earldoms. Their acquisition of the crown, and a series of internal conflicts and confiscations, meant that by around the 1460s, the monarchy had transformed its position within the realm, gaining control of most of the "provincial" earldoms and lordships. Rather than running semi-independent lordships, the major magnates now had scattered estates and occasional regions of major influence. In the Highlands, James II created two new provincial earldoms for his favourites: Argyll for the Campbells and Huntly for the Gordons, which acted as a bulwark against the vast Lordship of the Isles built up by the Macdonalds. James IV largely resolved the Macdonald problem by annexing the estates and titles of John Macdonald II to the crown in 1493 after discovering his plans for an alliance with the English.

== See also ==
- Government in medieval England

== Bibliography ==
- Barrow, G. W. S., Grant, A., and Stringer, K. J., eds, Medieval Scotland: Crown, Lordship and Community (Edinburgh: Edinburgh University Press, 1998), ISBN 0-7486-1110-X.
- Bawcutt P. J. and Williams, J. H., A Companion to Medieval Scottish Poetry (DS Brewer, 2006), ISBN 1-84384-096-0.
- Brown, K. M., and Tanner, R. J., The History of the Scottish Parliament volume 1: Parliament and Politics, 1235–1560 (Edinburgh: Edinburgh University Press, 2004), ISBN 0-7486-1485-0.
- Graham-Campbell, J. and Batey, C. E., Vikings in Scotland: An Archaeological Survey (Edinburgh: Edinburgh University Press, 1998), ISBN 0-7486-0641-6.
- MacDonald, A. R., The Burghs and Parliament in Scotland, c. 1550–1651 (Aldershot: Ashgate, 2007), ISBN 0-7546-5328-5.
- Mackie, J. D., Lenman, B., and Parker, G., A History of Scotland (London: Penguin, 1991), ISBN 0-14-013649-5.
- MacKay. A., and Ditchburn, D., eds, Atlas of Medieval Europe (London: Routledge, 1997), ISBN 0-415-12231-7.
- Lynch, M., ed., The Oxford Companion to Scottish History (Oxford, Oxford University Press, 2004), ISBN 0-19-969305-6.
- Reid, K., and Zimmerman, R., A History of Private Law in Scotland: I. Introduction and Property (Oxford: Oxford University Press, 2000), ISBN 0-19-829941-9.
- Sharples, N. and Smith, R., "Norse settlement in the Western Isles" in A. Woolf, ed., Scandinavian Scotland – Twenty Years After (St Andrews: St Andrews University Press), ISBN 978-0-9512573-7-1.
- Stafford, P., ed., A Companion to the Early Middle Ages: Britain and Ireland, c.500-c.1100 (Chichester: Wiley-Blackwell, 2009), ISBN 1-4051-0628-X.
- Tanner, R. J., The Late Medieval Scottish Parliament: Politics and the Three Estates, 1424–1488 (Edinburgh: Tuckwell, 2001), ISBN 1-86232-174-4.
- Woolf, A., From Pictland to Alba: 789 – 1070 (Edinburgh: Edinburgh University Press, 2007), ISBN 0-7486-1234-3.
