= Government in late medieval England =

The government of the Kingdom of England in the Middle Ages was a monarchy based on the principles of feudalism. The king possessed ultimate executive, legislative, and judicial power. However, some limits to the king's authority had been imposed by the 13th century. Magna Carta established the principle that taxes could not be levied without common consent, and Parliament was able to assert its power over taxation throughout this period.

For information on English government before 1216, see Government in Norman and Angevin England.

== Crown ==
=== Inheritance and coronation ===
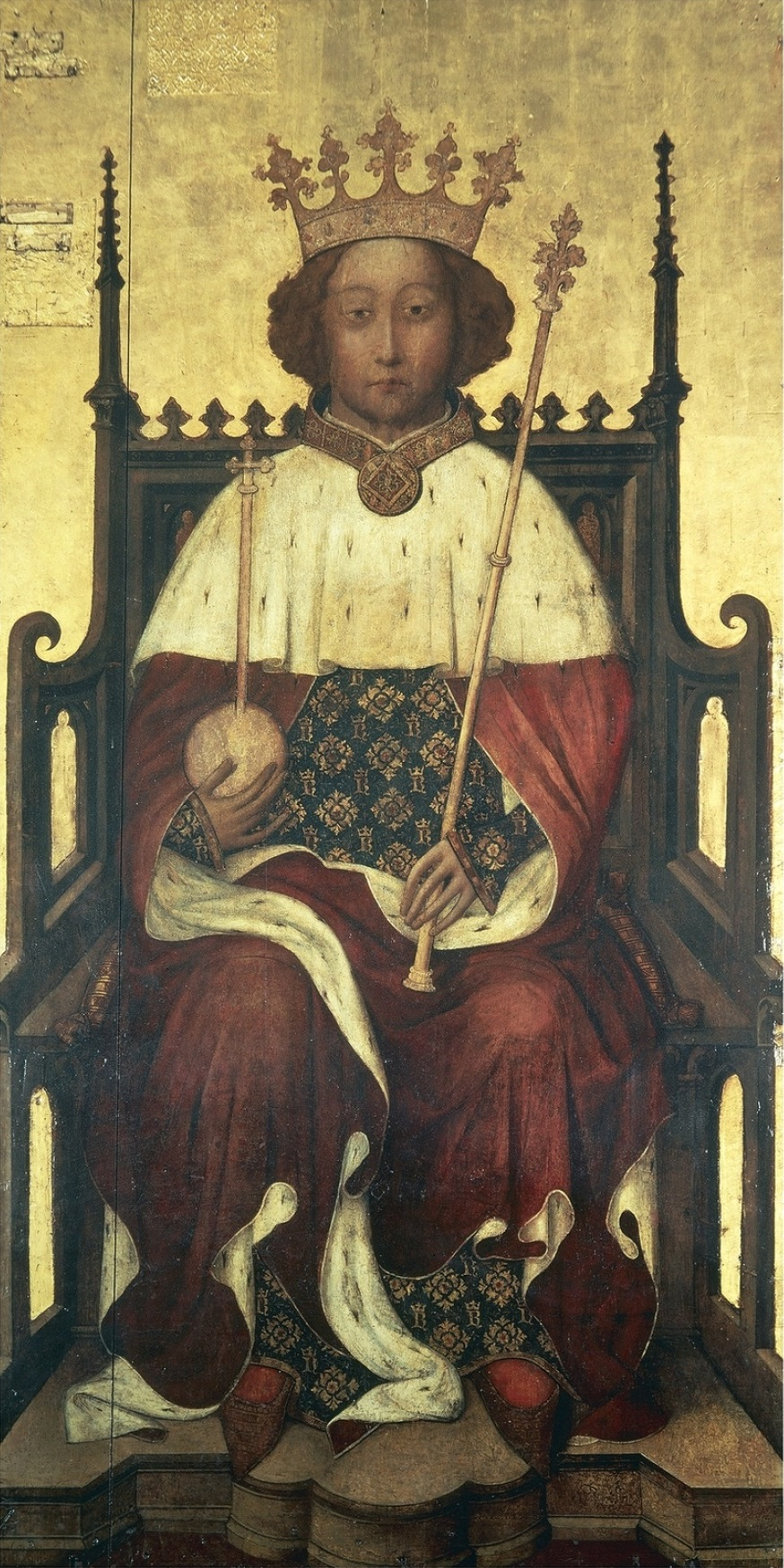
Richard II of England's coronation portrait

Under the Plantagenets, rules of primogeniture were established, and a new reign was considered to have begun on the death of the old king. When Henry III died in 1272, his son Edward I became king even though he was on a crusade at the time and would not be crowned until 1274.

Henry III was crowned twice. The nine-year-old Henry was first given a hasty coronation in 1216 at Gloucester Cathedral by Guala Bicchieri, the papal legate. In a second coronation at Westminster Abbey, the king was crowned by the archbishop of Canterbury as was customary.

Edward II was not crowned until February 1308, seven months after his accession. Edward III was crowned quickly out of necessity due to his accession after the deposition of his father. Edward II was deposed on 20 January 1327 and his son was crowned on 1 February.

At the coronation, the new king swore an oath. The precise wording is unknown before 1308. The king probably swore to uphold the laws of King Edward the Confessor, to work for the peace of the church and the people, and to prevent rapacity and oppression. Both Henry III and Edward I additionally promised to preserve and recover the rights of the Crown. Edward II added the clause promising "to maintain and preserve the laws and rightful customs which the community of your realm shall have chosen".

=== Rights and authority ===
As a feudal overlord, the king had various rights over tenants-in-chief (or feudal barons) including the rights:

- of wardship of underage heirs
- to arrange or sell the marriages of under-age heiresses and widows
- to demand military service
- to demand payment of a feudal aid upon the marriage of the king's eldest daughter or the knighting of his eldest son

Unlike other lords, kings were anointed and had greater power. The Crown alone:

- could coin money
- had authority over main roads
- could declare war (though it was wise for kings to obtain parliamentary consent)
- could not be sued
- had sole jurisdiction over certain crimes (but could delegate authority to private jurisdictions)

The king carried with him a special jurisdiction called the verge, which was the 12 mile area around the king's person where local courts did not have authority to hear cases. Only the courts of the royal household had jurisdiction.

The Roman law principle of necessity was also an important component of the Crown's powers. If the king could demonstrate an urgent necessity, his subjects were obliged to assist him. In 1294, Edward I justified his seizure of wool based on the "certain and urgent necessity" that existed. Edward III also requested taxation on the basis of the necessity of defending the realm.

=== Limitations ===
Royal authority was challenged. Henry de Bracton argued that the king was under the law, and if he went beyond the law he should be "bridled" by his earls and barons.

In the 13th century, the distinction between the king and the Crown developed. In the reign of Henry III, there are some indications that the Crown was regarded as distinct from the king in terms of the alienation of royal land. By the reign of Edward III, this distinction was well developed. The Crown Estate belonged to the Crown and should not be alienated by individual kings.

During the reign of Edward II, the earl of Lincoln presented the Declaration of 1308 arguing that homage and allegiance were due more to the Crown than to the person of the king. One of the arguments for deposing Edward II was that he had not defended the rights of the Crown, specifically that he failed to preserve royal lands and had taken evil counsel.

=== King's council ===
The king's council provided the monarch with expert advice and assistance in governing the kingdom. It was involved in legal, financial, and diplomatic business. It heard important legal cases, and it could reach decisions without reference to the common law. It could draft legislation in the form of administrative orders issued as letters patent or letters close.

Members included the king's ministers and closest advisers, such as judges, the chancellor, and the treasurer. Members took an oath to give the king faithful counsel. The council met in the Star Chamber at Westminster Palace.

=== Royal household ===
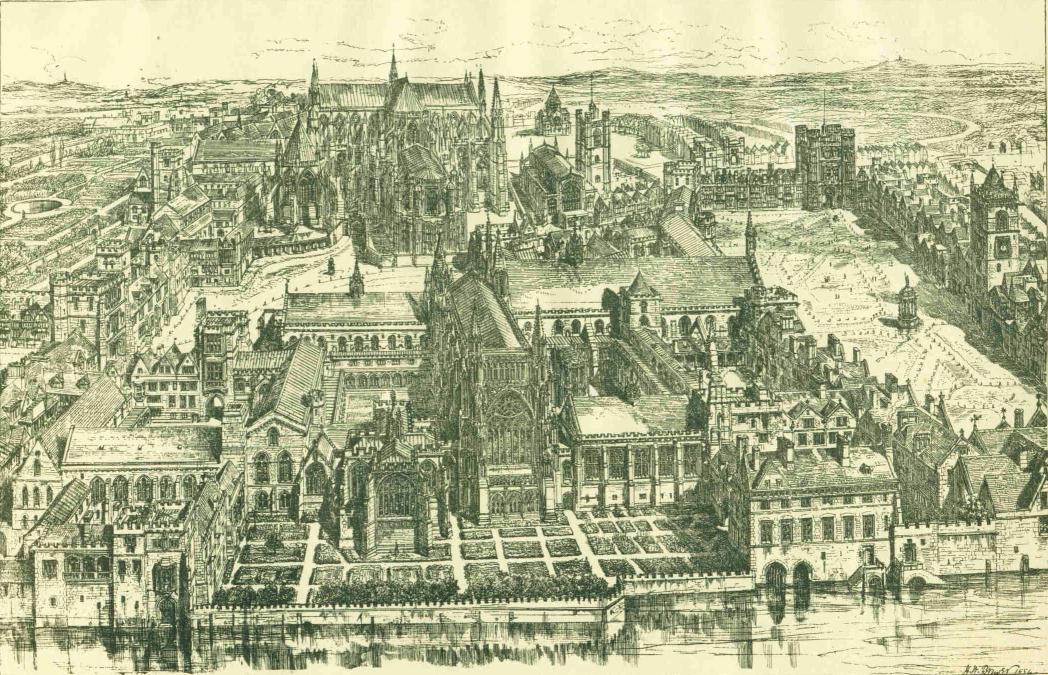
Westminster Palace, the main royal residence, showing St Stephen's Chapel in the centre with the White Chamber and Painted Chamber on the left and Westminster Hall on the right

In the Middle Ages, there was no clear distinction between the royal court and the royal household. The court might refer to everyone around the king, while the household referred to the specific institution that served the king.

There were around 500 members of the household. The most important department was the wardrobe. It managed the household's finances and oversaw war spending. It was led by the keeper of the wardrobe, who was one of the king's most important ministers. The wardrobe controlled the privy seal, which was used to issue orders to the chancery and exchequer. Under Edward II, this writing office was separated from the wardrobe, and the king began using the secret seal when issuing orders to the keeper of the privy seal.

The military household included bannerets, knights, squires, and sergeants-at-arms. In addition to a military role, they also served as administrators and diplomats.

=== Departments ===
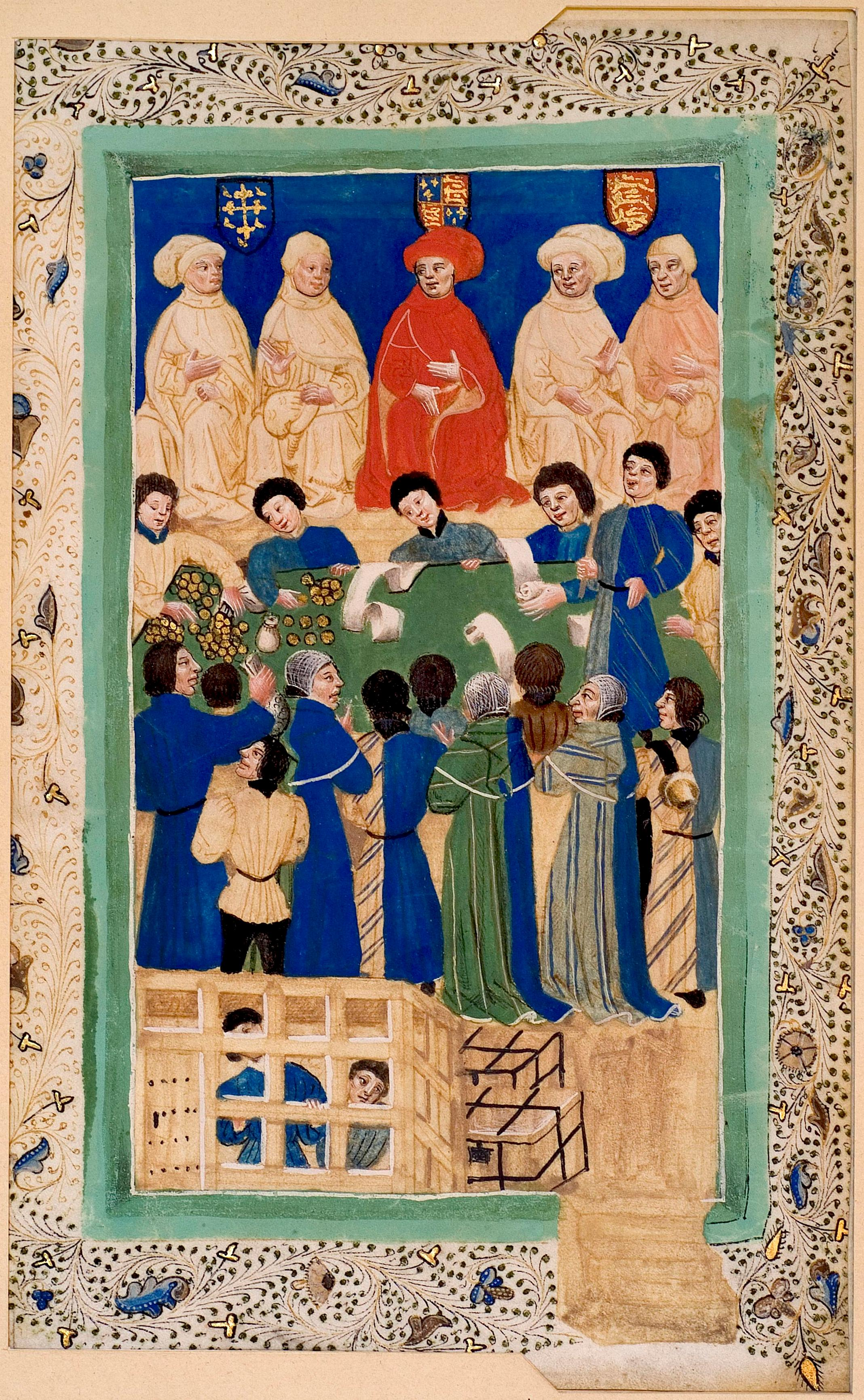
The Exchequer of Pleas at work

The main financial department was the exchequer. The exchequer developed under Henry I (r. 1100–1135) and audited the accounts of sheriffs and other royal officials. At the end of the 12th century, it moved from Winchester to a chamber adjacent to Westminster Hall. The lower exchequer received payments and issued receipts in the form of tally sticks. The upper exchequer was a court called the Exchequer of Pleas.

In theory, the exchequer controlled government finances. All royal revenue was supposed to be paid to the exchequer, and its officers (the treasurer and exchequer chamberlains) would pay out funds as needed to the royal household. In reality, there were periods, such as in the reign of Edward I, where the wardrobe was outside of the exchequer's control. Household officials often diverted royal revenue before it ever reached the exchequer, and the wardrobe did not always submit its accounts to be audited.

The chancellor oversaw the chancery or government writing office. It was originally part of the royal chapel. The clerks in the chapel served both the king's spiritual and secretarial needs. During Edward I's reign, the chancery clerks started to stay in England rather than accompany the king on foreign military expeditions. By the reign of Edward III, it was permanently based at Westminster.

In 1324, there were about a hundred clerks who produced around 29,000 writs. At the head of the chancery's organization were 12 master clerks who were termed "first form" clerks. Beneath them were 12 second form clerks. Beneath them were the 24 cursitors who wrote the standardized writs. Below these were assistant clerks and servants.

Government administration could be needlessly complicated. In the 14th century, a royal order could be issued originally under the king's secret seal, then sent to the privy seal office which would instruct the chancery to prepare the final writ. "Three documents were used where one would have sufficed. This might lead to long delays."

== Parliament ==
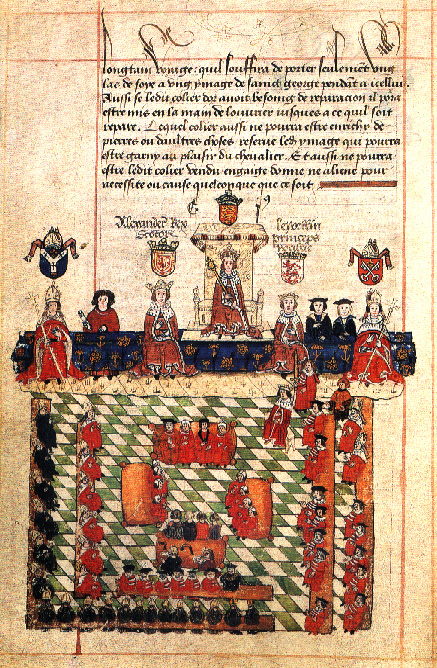
A 16th-century depiction of the Parliament of King Edward I. The lords spiritual are seated to the king's right, the lords temporal to his left, and in the centre sit the justices and law officers.

Parliament evolved out of the magnum concilium and met occasionally when summoned by the king. Parliament differed from the older great council by being "an institution of the community rather than the crown". For the community of the realm, "it acts as representative, approaching the government from without, and 'parleying' with the king and his council".

Before 1258, legislation was not a major part of parliamentary business. It is in the reign of Edward I that Parliament passed the first major statutes. "However, they were not made by the King in Parliament, but simply announced by the king or his ministers in a parliament" [emphasis in original]. The actual work of law-making was done by the king and his council. Completed legislation was then presented to Parliament for ratification.

Parliament successfully asserted for itself the right to consent to taxation, and a pattern developed in which the king would make concessions (such as reaffirming Magna Carta) in return for grants of taxation. This was its main tool in disputes with the king. Nevertheless, this proved ineffective at restraining the king as he was still able to raise lesser amounts of revenue from sources that did not require parliamentary consent:

- county farms (the fixed sum paid annually by sheriffs for the privilege of administering and profiting from royal lands in their counties)
- profits from the eyre
- tallage on the Crown Estate, the towns, foreign merchants, and most importantly English Jews
- scutage
- feudal dues and fines
- profits from wardship, escheat, and vacant episcopal sees

== Local government ==
=== Counties ===
England was divided into 39 counties, which existed with only minor boundary changes until 1974 when the Local Government Act 1972 went into effect.

The most important county officer was the sheriff. Sheriffs were appointed by the king and served at his pleasure. He presided over the county court, collected taxes, and paid the county farm owed to the king. As the main communication channel between the Crown and the counties, the sheriff was responsible for sharing royal proclamations. He was assisted by an under-sheriff, clerks, bailiffs, and sub-bailiffs. One clerk was responsible for county finances, and another was responsible for recording writs received and actions taken. Henry III preferred to appoint local knights to the office, and this trend continued after his reign.

The king appointed an escheator for counties north of the Trent and another for those counties south of it. These appointed sub-escheators in each county to enforce royal wardship rights and manage lands that escheated to the Crown.

== Justice system ==
=== Central courts ===
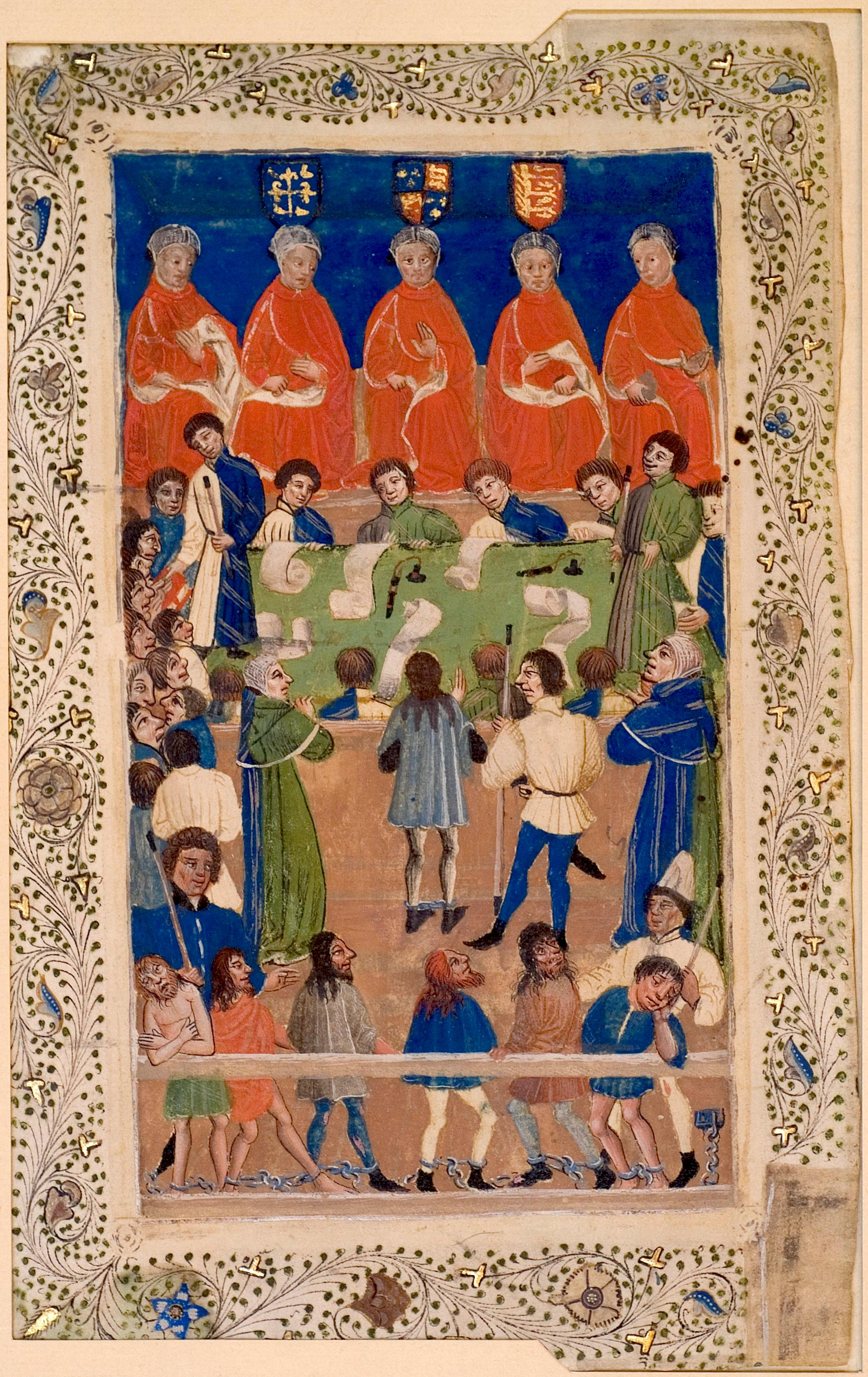
The Court of King's Bench depicted in an illuminated manuscript from about 1460

The king was the fount of justice. Initially, important cases were heard coram rege (Latin for "in the presence of the king") with the advice of his curia regis. But the growth of the legal system required specialization, and the judicial functions of the curia regis were delegated to two courts sitting at Westminster Hall.

The Court of Common Pleas split from the Exchequer of Pleas in the 1190s. It had jurisdiction over civil cases (such as debts, property rights, and trespass). It was staffed by a chief justice of the Common Pleas and several other justices of the Common Pleas.

In the 1230s, the earlier coram rege court developed into the Court of King's Bench. It originally traveled with the king but was permanently based at Westminster Hall by the 1300s. Cases came before the King's Bench as appeals from lower courts (including Common Pleas) by writs of error. It had jurisdiction over civil matters involving the king and criminal cases. It was staffed by the chief justice of the King's Bench and several justices of the King's Bench.

== See also ==
- Elizabethan government
- Government in medieval Scotland
- History of the constitution of the United Kingdom
