= Elizabethan government =

English government during the reign of Elizabeth I

England under Elizabeth I's reign, the Elizabethan era, was ruled by the very structured and complicated Elizabethan government. It was divided into the national bodies (the monarch, Privy Council, and Parliament), the regional bodies (the Council of the North and Council of the Marches), the county, community bodies and the court system.

== Structure ==
=== National bodies ===
==== Privy Council ====
The Privy Council was a group of specially chosen advisors that functioned as the principal executive branch of Elizabeth's government. Both Elizabeth and the members of the Council worked to ensure that no single member monopolized royal confidence. When advice from the Council was followed, Elizabeth was sure to make it seen that all decisions were the expression of Her royal will, not the reflection of the influence of any one councilor or group of councilors. Routine administration was usually left to the Council. It was involved in matters of religion, military, the queen's security, economics, and the welfare of the citizens. It dealt with national and individual interest matters, issued proclamations in the queen's name, and supervised law and enforcement.

The Council could make decisions, but Elizabeth reserved the right to veto anything with which she disagreed without question. Membership was decided entirely by the Queen however, certain powerful noblemen were necessary for the Council so that their and their realms' interests were represented to avoid a rebellion. Believing that more members (and therefore more different opinions) would cause more problems, Elizabeth dropped the previous member count from 50 to 19 and eventually 11 by 1597. The Counselors employed assistants who did most of the work. When first established they met only 3 times a week; by the end of Elizabeth's reign, they met almost every day.

An important member of the Privy Council was Elizabeth’s Secretary of State, William Cecil. Cecil was close to Elizabeth even before she was queen, and their personal relationship was described as one of confidence, trust, and mutual respect. Cecil played an important role in some of the first businesses of the Queen's government; the making of peace with France and Scotland and the re-establishment of a reformed polity in the church. Some of his most critical work was driving French forces from Scotland and winning his Queen the right to interfere in Scottish affairs in order to sustain the terms of the 1560 treaties. His son, Robert Cecil, was also a member of Queen Elizabeth's Privy council.

Robert Dudley was appointed to the Privy Council in October 1562. At the time he was widely considered to be Elizabeth’s favorite and this favor meant he immediately became part of the Council’s senior members. Exact information on Dudley’s political role and influence is unavailable due to the dispersed nature of his personal papers and correspondence.

==== Parliament ====
The group of representatives, called Parliament, was divided into the House of Lords (or the Upper House), which consisted of nobility and higher clergy such as bishops and archbishops, and the House of Commons (or the Lower House), which consisted of common people. Unlike the modern British Parliament, it had much less power, no Prime Minister or cabinet, and no political parties.

The main function of Parliament was dealing with financial matters (taxation and granting the Queen money). Generally, the monarch paid for daily administration with ordinary revenues (customs, feudal dues, and sales of land) while Parliament covered extraordinary expenditures (such as war) with taxation. However, taxation didn't supply enough for military expenditures; therefore, more land was sold along with probably illegal scheming. Parliament was also used for passing laws. 438 laws were passed under Elizabeth's reign. They were either public, in which case they applied to all, or private, in which case they only applied to certain people. Only another Parliament could undo one. They required approval by both houses thrice and the Queen. However, the Queen could make Royal Proclamations without Parliament's consent. Another purpose of Parliament was to advise. Elizabeth was almost never interested in Parliament's advice.

Elections occurred only for the House of Commons. Who was in Parliament depended mainly on who was supported by the important local people. Only those that were male and received a certain annual income could vote.

The monarch decided when Parliament was to be called. In total, Elizabeth only called Parliament thirteen times, 11 of which were to ask for money.

=== Local governments ===
Local governments were important in Tudor England. Regional governments helped oversee parts of England that the Privy Council could not supervise. The Council of the North, which resided in York, oversaw Northern England, while the Council of the Marches, which resided in Ludlow, oversaw Wales and some border counties.

Royal representatives (Justices of the Peace, Sheriffs, and Lords Lieutenant) were appointed in every county; they ensured that the queen's commands and laws were obeyed. Each city and town had its own government, headed by a mayor as well.

Manors were run by nobility and gentry. Land was power at the time; those with land received payments from the tenants on their land and from their workers. They therefore had significant wealth and influence. Another benefit was that the tenants were loyal to their local lord and if called upon they were obligated to follow the lord to war. They also had responsibilities, for they were meant to aid the monarch by governing their land. Local grievances were taken to the lord of the manor. The lord's views tended to greatly influence those of his largely uneducated tenants.

=== Courts ===
The courts made up the judicial system of Elizabethan England. The most important courts were the Great Sessions Courts or the Assizes, which were held twice a year in each county, and the Quarter Sessions Courts, which were held four times in a year. These two dealt with most crimes. The Assizes was famous for its power to inflict harsh punishments.

Unimportant crimes were handled by the Petty Sessions Courts, Manor Courts, and town courts. Civil cases were dealt with by various courts, depending on the person's monetary status; the wealthy were tried by the Star Chamber, one of the highest profile courts which consisted of mostly Privy Counselors. The Court of Chancery judged criminal cases, the Exchequer of Pleas dealt with financial suits, the Court of Requests with the poor ("the court of the poor man’s causes," as it was known), Church Courts with religious and moral cases, and other specific courts with other specific matters.

Committers of high treason and other serious crimes received the death sentence (often handled by the queen). Often a violent death sentence in the case of high treason involving being hanged, drawn and quartered; that is, hanged, taken down before dead, dragged face downward through the streets, and then hacked into four pieces, or quartered, only to have the remains displayed in a public place to discourage others from committing treason. Those of lesser crimes were sent to prison or the stocks. Uses of the pillory, ducking stool, the brank, the drunkards cloak, burning, the breaking wheel, and other forms of punishment and torture were also common during this time.

== Domestic policy ==
The domestic policy of the Elizabethan government was that of focusing more on internal issues, with few foreign excursions. One of the major issues solved early on was the Treaty of Edinburgh. A major domestic policy was that of being strictly anti-Catholic, which can be seen in the ousting of French influence, and thus Catholic influence, in Scotland. William Cecil and Robert Dudley played major roles in the queen’s domestic policy, and much of the queen’s time was spent navigating all the issues that would rise up and dealing with the survivors of the Marian Council, whose support carried much weight, but the members of which were not wont to take initiative in important actions.

== Foreign policy ==
Elizabethan government concerning foreign policy is often accused of being affected by factionalism. This appears true in the later part of her reign, post-Armada, when factions led by the Earl of Essex and the Cecils (William and Robert), argued over which way the war against Spain should proceed. Essex, keen for glory and prestige, favored an expensive land based military strategy, whilst the Cecil faction advocated a cheaper moderate naval strategy. Due to the conflicting factions no policy was explicitly followed and each side frequently tried to undermine the others, resulting in a confused foreign policy.

Faction pre-Armada is harder to analyze. The traditional view put forward by Read and Neale, suggests that William Cecil (later Lord Burghley) was continually in faction against Robert Dudley, over issues such as marriage and most importantly intervention in the Netherlands. Revisionist historian Adams defines faction as "one group of people employed in direct opposition to another", and it is on this premise that historians such as John Guy argue there was no true faction in the Council at this stage, disagreements were primarily over individual opinions, and judgements over how to proceed; all councilors, after the removal of conservative Norfolk, were agreed that Elizabeth should look to further and protect the Protestant cause. Leicester and Walsingham saw intervention in the Netherlands as the best way to achieve this, whilst Cecil was more moderate.

== Impact ==
The Elizabethan era is where some of the first instances of a "Britain First" policy emerged as a focus of the government of the Isles, a policy of keeping the powers of the continent away from decision-making and reducing their influence on British politics. William Cecil was one of the first people to champion this policy which would go on to greatly impact how the Crown and Government would interact with mainland European polities. This period is also the start of England's colonial endeavors, which in time would encapsulate much of the world.

A major goal of the Elizabethan government, at the direction of Elizabeth herself, was the strengthening of the Anglican Church, which was something they succeeded greatly in. Elizabeth used the Church as a tool to help cement her authority as well as to set herself apart from her Catholic sister. Before Elizabeth, many Englishmen still practiced their faith in a way that was broadly similar to their Catholic roots, but her reign helped establish a firm identity for the Church of England.

== See also ==
- Government in medieval England
