= Veensgarth =

Coordinates: 60.183°N 1.229°W

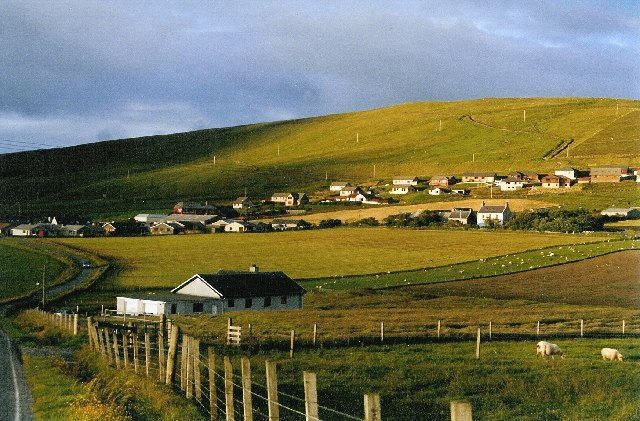
- The village of Veensgarth, nestling under Herrislee hill. Seen looking north-east.

- Location within Shetland
- OS grid reference: HU427444
- Civil parish: Tingwall
- Council area: Shetland
- Lieutenancy area: Shetland
- Country: Scotland
- Sovereign state: United Kingdom
- Post town: SHETLAND
- Postcode district: ZE2
- Dialling code: 01595
- Police: Scotland
- Fire: Scottish
- Ambulance: Scottish
- UK Parliament: Orkney and Shetland
- Scottish Parliament: Shetland

Veensgarth (Shaetlan pronunciation: [ˈviːnsɡərt] VEENS-gərt; Vingarðr, Meadow Farm), is a village in the Tingwall valley west of Lerwick on Mainland in Shetland, Scotland. It includes the Vallafield housing estate. Veensgarth is also within the parish of Tingwall, and is situated at the junction of the A970 and the B9074.
