= Tingwall, Shetland =

Coordinates: 60.167°N 1.233°W

Tingwall
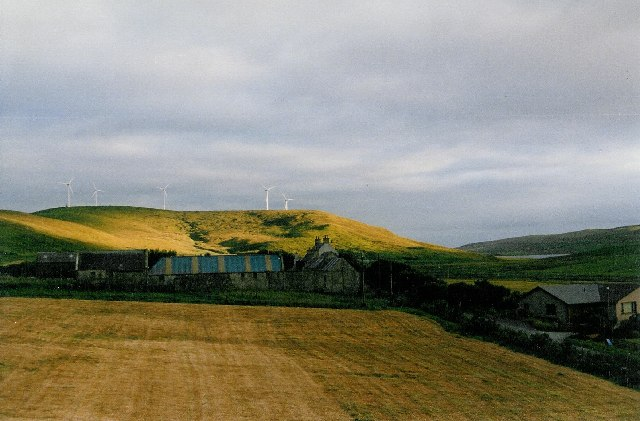
- Veensgarth, with Burra Dale wind farm in the background, along with Loch of Tingwall

- Location within Shetland
- OS grid reference: HU425426
- Civil parish: Tingwall
- Council area: Shetland
- Lieutenancy area: Shetland
- Country: Scotland
- Sovereign state: United Kingdom
- Post town: SHETLAND
- Postcode district: ZE2
- Dialling code: 01595
- Police: Scotland
- Fire: Scottish
- Ambulance: Scottish
- UK Parliament: Orkney and Shetland
- Scottish Parliament: Shetland

Tingwall (Shaetlan pronunciation: ['tɪŋwəɫ] TING-wəl; from Old Norse: Þingvǫllr, lit. 'Field of the Thing assembly') is a parish in Shetland, Scotland. Located mostly on the Shetland Mainland, the centre lies about 2 miles north of Scalloway. Tingwall Airport is located in the village.

== Parish ==
Tingwall parish includes the settlements of Scalloway, Whiteness, Veensgarth and Gott, and the Vallafield housing estate. The centre of the parish was the Tingwall Kirk. It comprehends a section of Mainland, stretching from the Atlantic at Scalloway, to the North Sea at Rova Head and includes the formerly inhabited islands of Hildasay, Langa, Linga, Papa and Oxna.

The Mainland section is divided into two districts by a hill ridge, and comprises two parallel valleys (nearly at right angles from the ridge). The Tingwall valley extends north from near Scalloway to the south end of Lax Firth. It is diversified by the lochs of Tingwall, Girlsta, Asta, Strom and some others.

It is so indented by the sea as to contain no point farther than two miles (three kilometres) from it. Measured across marine intersections, it has a length of about 19 miles (31 kilometres), and a maximum breadth of 10 miles (16 kilometres).

== History ==
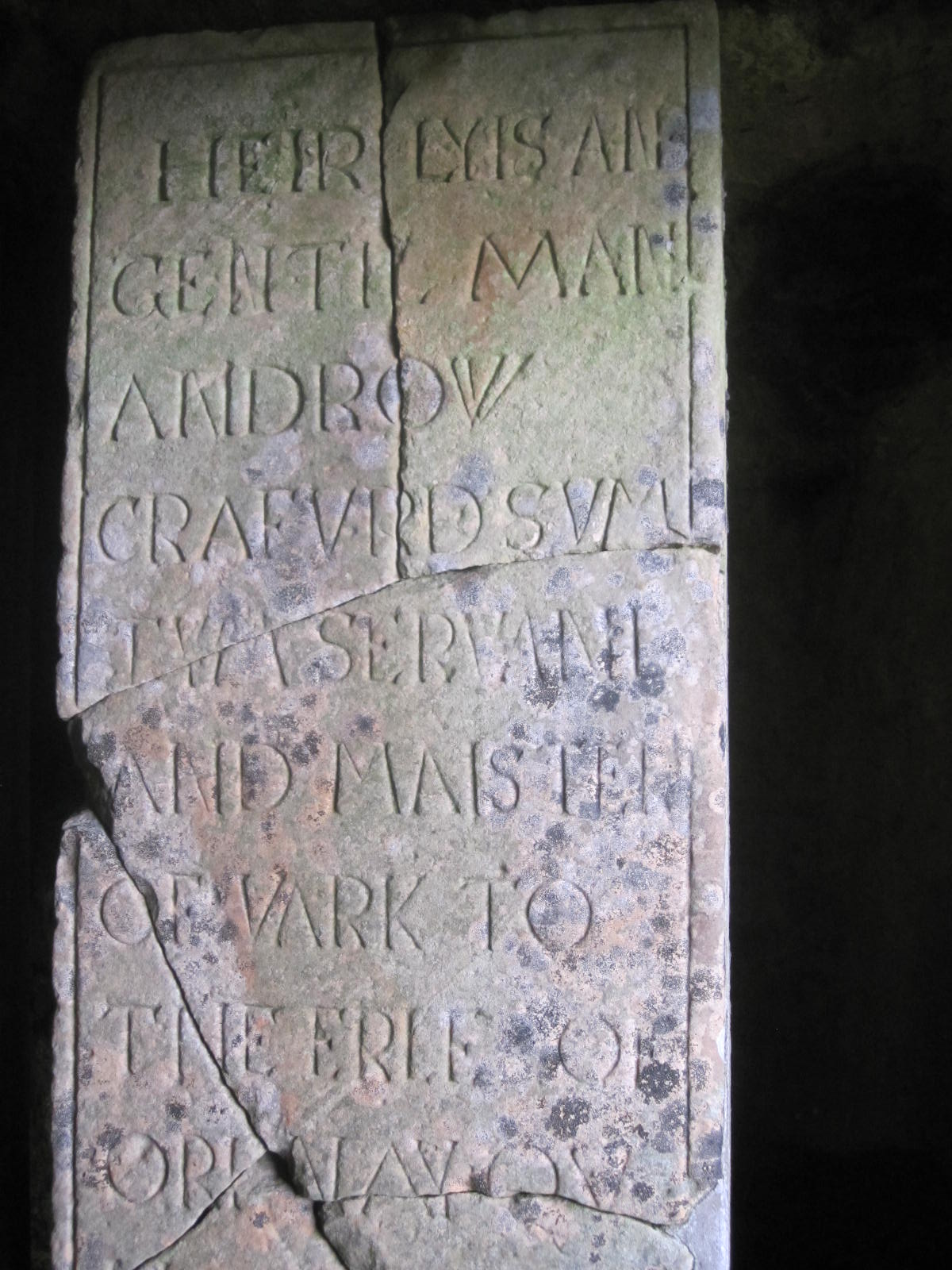
Monument to Andrew Crawford, master of work to the Earl of Orkney in Tingwall kirkyard

The small promontory at the end of Tingwall Loch, known as Tingaholm or Law Ting Holm was once home to Shetland's earliest parliament. It was once an islet entirely surrounded by water and accessed by a stone causeway. In the 1850s the level of the loch was lowered, and the holm took on its present form.

Tingwall was also the base of the Archdeaconry in Shetland. The present day church lies on the site of a much older building, originally dedicated to St Magnus. The burial vault in the churchyard, a turf covered mound with an arched stone doorway, is believed to belong to this earlier building. The burial vault contains 17th and 18th century stone grave slabs. The earlier church, which is thought to have had a round tower, is similar in design to that of the St Magnus Kirk on Egilsay, Orkney.

There are a number of ancient and historical monuments in Tingwall, including a standing stone known as the murder stone. This stone is traditionally said to be the site where the Earl of Orkney killed his cousin in a power struggle over Shetland. Local folklore also suggests that a person could escape punishment at the Thing if they were able to run to the stone and claim sanctuary. Other versions of this story involve running to the Kirk, or the nearby croft at Griesta.

Tingwall was the home of brothers Laurence I. Graham (Lollie) and John J. Graham, two of Shetland's most influential 20th Century Writers.

== Wildlife ==
Tufted duck, red-breasted merganser and common and black-headed gull frequent the loch, which is also home to Shetland's only mute swans.

== Other sources ==
- The original article is based on Shetlopedia.co a GFDL wiki.
- Wilson, Rev. John The Gazetteer of Scotland (Edinburgh: 1882) Published by W. & A. K. Johnstone
- Tudor, J. R. The Orkneys and Shetland: Their Past and Present State(London: 1883) Published by Edward Stanford)

== Related reading ==
- Fojut, Noel (1994) A Guide to Prehistoric and Viking Shetland (Shetland Times) ISBN 978-0-900662-91-1
