= Government in medieval England =

Government in medieval England may refer to:

- Government in Anglo-Saxon England (c. 500–1066)
- Government in Norman and Angevin England (1066–1216)
- Government in late medieval England (1216–1485)
