= Law Ting Holm =

Island in the Shetland Islands, Scotland

Location
- Location within Scotland
- OS grid reference: HU416427
- Coordinates: 60.17296°N 1.24828°W

Name
- Name meaning: flat island of the parliament

Physical geography
- Island group: Shetland
- Area: <1 ha
- Highest elevation: <5 metres (16 ft)

Administration
- Council area: Shetland Islands Council
- Country: Scotland
- Sovereign state: United Kingdom

Law Ting Holm (also known as Tingaholm) is a small promontory at the north end of the freshwater Loch of Tingwall, Mainland Shetland, Scotland. It was once an islet entirely surrounded by water, joined to the shore by a stone causeway 1.7 metres (6 ft) wide and 42.7 metres (140 ft) long. In the 1850s the levels of the loch were lowered and the holm evolved to its present form. The Loch of Tingwall is west of the town of Lerwick and has one additional island - Holm of Setter.

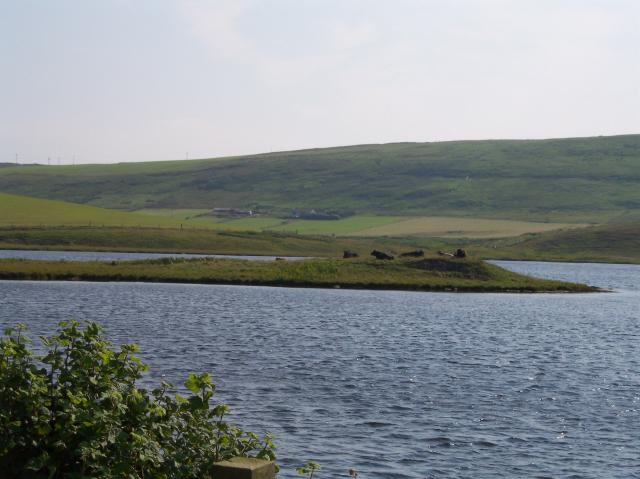
Law Ting Holm

== Norse parliament ==
Law Ting Holm was the location of Shetland's local parliament until the late 16th Century. There are documents relating to assemblies taking place in Tingwall from as early as 1307, although the only reference to the Thing (assembly) meeting on the holm itself comes from a letter dated 1532.

As was common with other such meeting places, a mound may have been made from handsful of earth from the various local things represented at the meeting, so that all members could say that they were on their home ground. A small, much eroded mound can still be seen and the remains of a wall were found on the perimeter of the island, suggesting the creation of secluded area for meetings. Locations where the deliberations of the assembly could be seen but not easily overheard are typical of thing sites. The stones on which the "Ford" and other officials of the meeting sat, were reportedly removed at some time in the 18th century to improve the grazing potential.

In the 1570s Earl Robert Stewart moved the thing to nearby Scalloway Castle, although the holm was used once more in 1577 when over 700 Shetlanders brought a complaint against the local Foud, Lawrence Bruce, before royal commissioners from Edinburgh.

Writing in 1774, Low reports that the stone seats had been ripped up to create more room for grazing, although in 1809 Edmonston suggests that the sites of a stone table and bench can still be traced upon the holm. Excavation undertaken in 2011 as part of the HERA funded Assembly Project revealed the remains of a Late Iron Age/ Pictish settlement at the Law Ting Holm but did not produce clear evidence of later activities. However, archaeological finds indicate that the causeway continued to be maintained well into the 19th century.

== Other Thing Sites ==
Thing assembly sites are found throughout Northern Europe, as a result of a shared Norse heritage. They are often identifiable by their shared thing, ting, ding and fing place names. Examples include Þingvellir in Iceland, Tinganes in the Faroe Islands, Tynwald Hill in the Isle of Man, Fingay Hill in England, and Dingwall in Scotland.

Tingwall is just one of a number of 'ting' names found in Shetland. The parish names Sandsting, Aithsting, Delting, Lunnasting and Nesting all suggest that a wider network of local thing sites once operated in the islands . The names Gnípnaþing, Þvætaþing and Rauðarþing can also be found in early documents, but have since gone out of use.

== THING Project ==
Law Ting Holm is one of a number of sites included in the Northern Periphery Programme's three year transatlantic THING Project. The Project, which includes partners from Iceland, Norway, the Faroe Islands, Orkney, Shetland, Highland Scotland and the Isle of Man, aims to explore and promote the shared links between the Northern European thing sites, and develop sustainable business and tourism opportunities in each of the partner regions. Amongst other things the delegates explored the possibility of a transnational World Heritage nomination, based on an expansion of Iceland's existing World Heritage site Þingvellir, at a meeting in Dingwall in September 2011. This initiative was publicised by the Shetland Islands Council sponsored "Move.Shetland" newsletter and the results of the process will be published in a report in 2012.

== Wildlife ==
Tufted duck, red-breasted merganser and common and black-headed gull frequent the loch, which is also home to Shetland's only mute swans.

== The arts ==
The Royal Scottish National Orchestra (RSNO) premièred Chris Stout's composition Tingaholm in Lerwick on 4 March 2012, a piece named after the Þing site.

== See also ==
- The Crucible of Iron Age Shetland
- World Heritage Sites in Scotland
