= List of hillforts in Scotland =

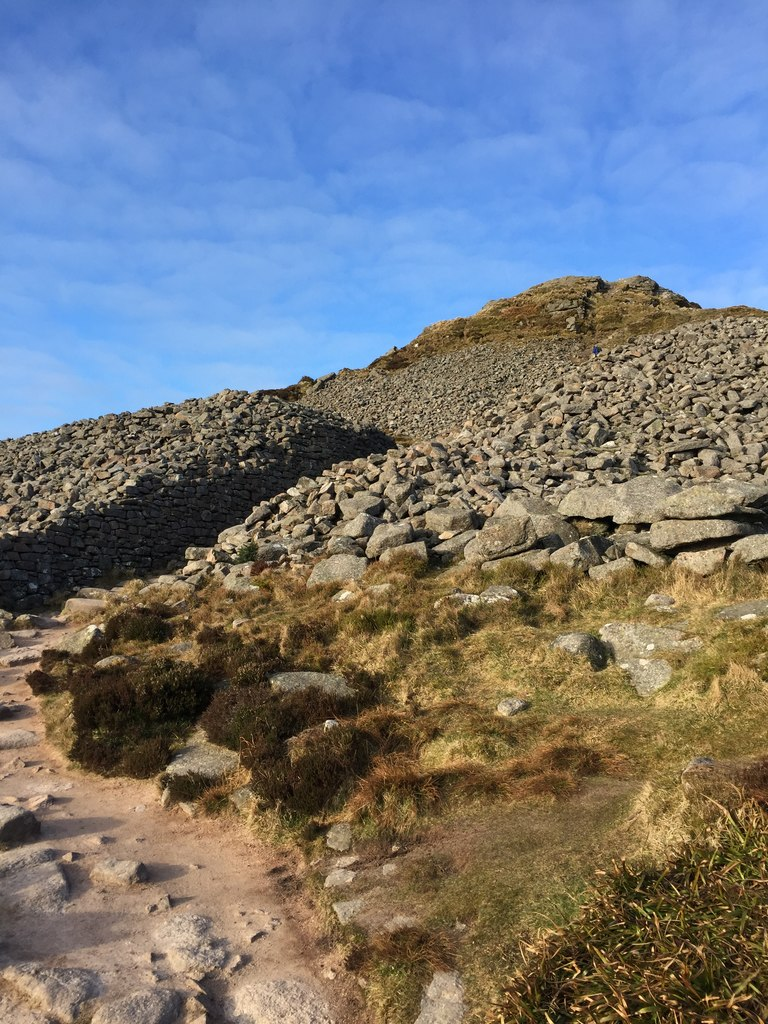
Mither Tap hillfort from the entrance.

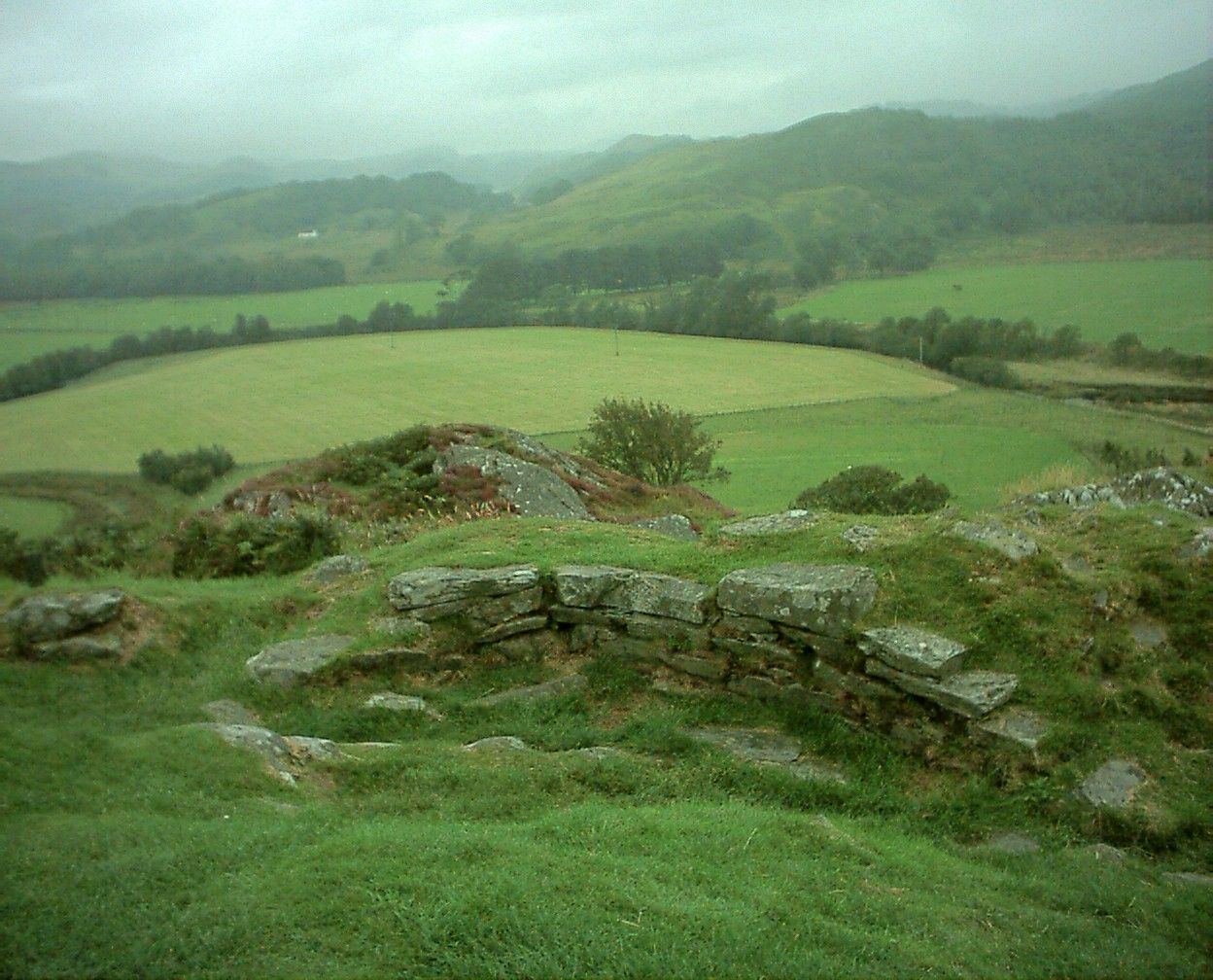
Remains of the fort at Dunadd, Kilmartin, Argyll

Animated LIDAR data of The Doon, or Drimadoon coastal hillfort, on the Isle of Arran

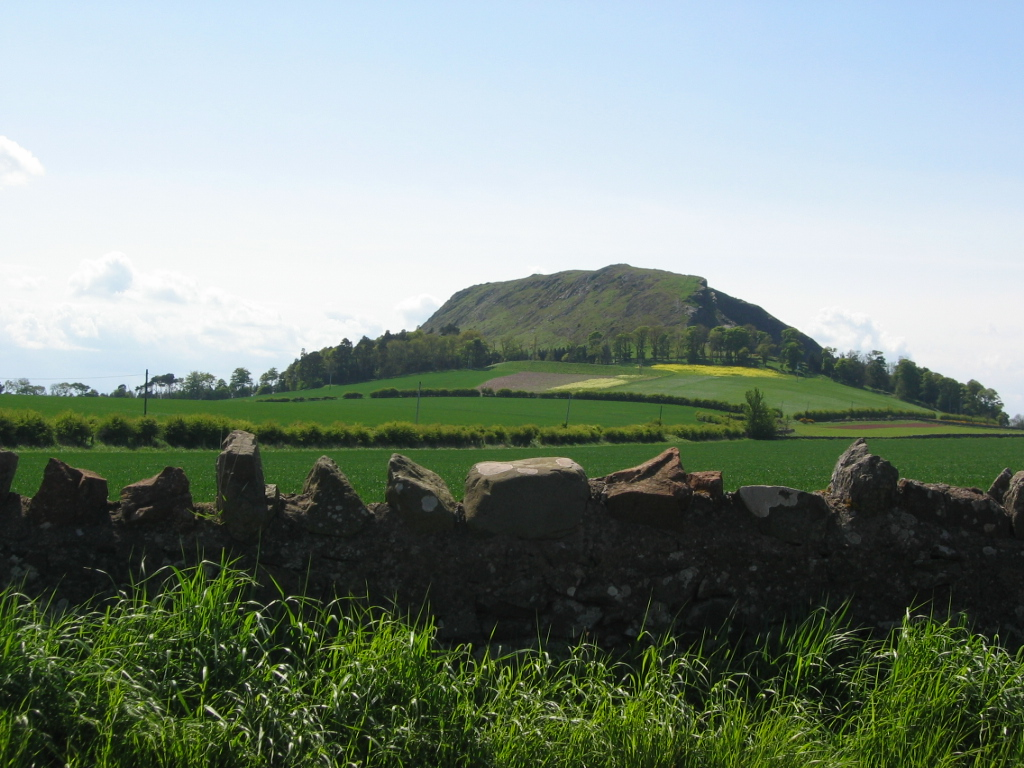
Traprain Law, East Lothian

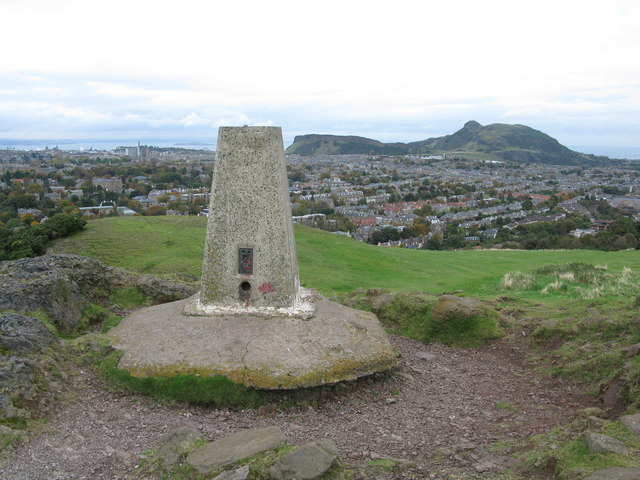
Arthur's Seat, viewed to the north-north-east from Blackford Hill Trig Point

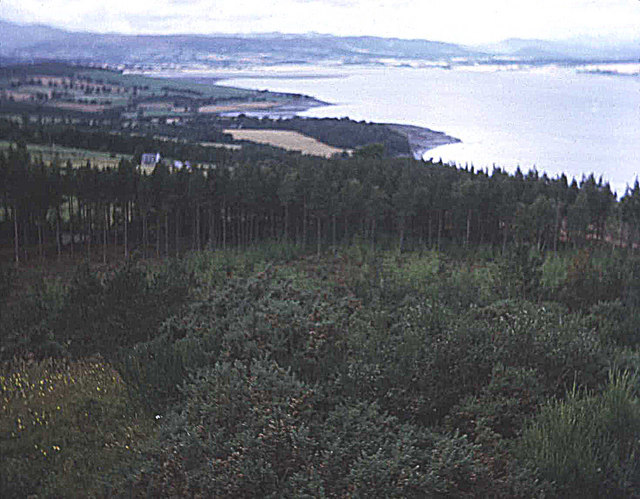
Prospect from Craig Phadrig, looking westward along the southern shore of the Beauly Firth

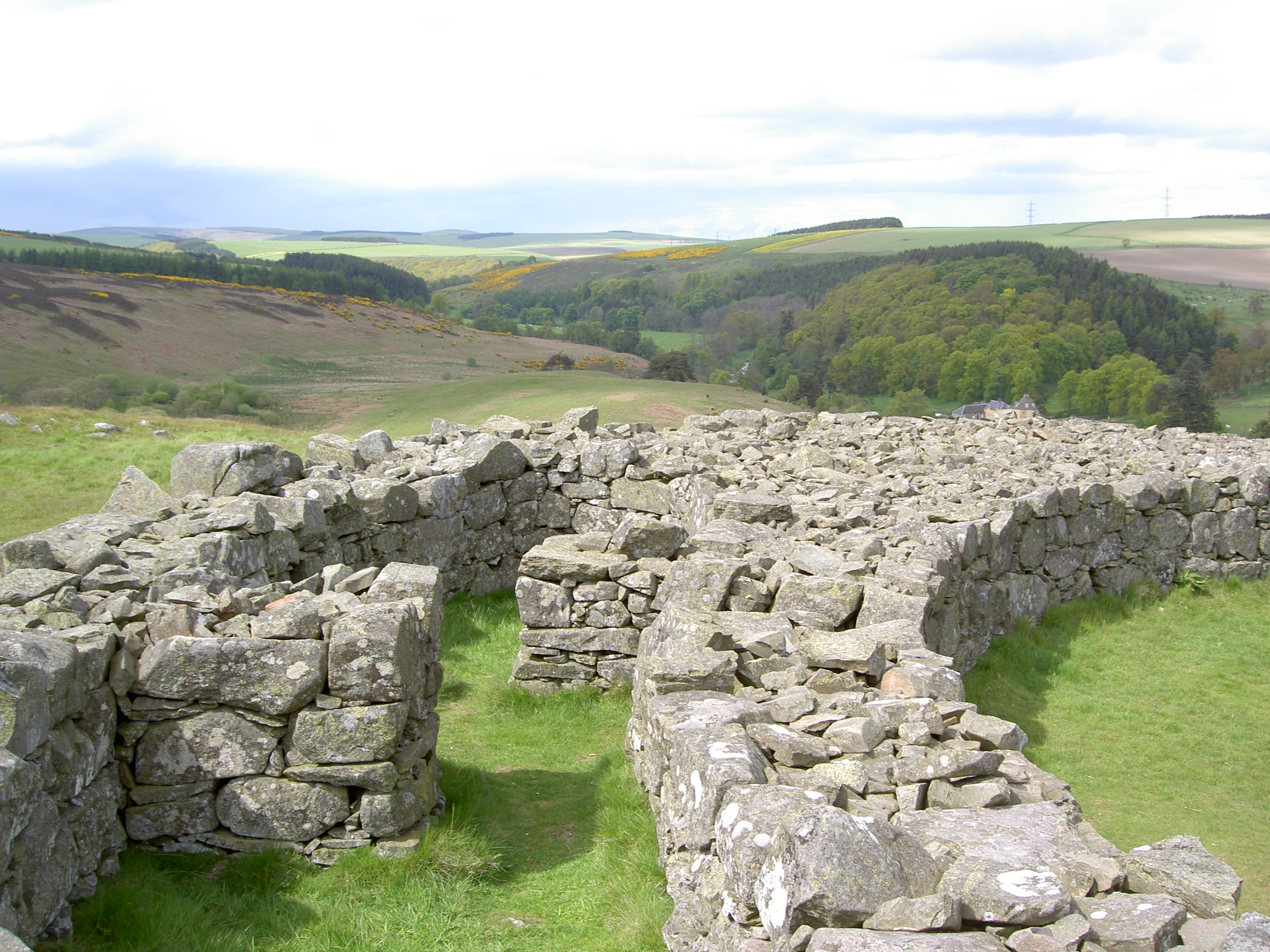
Edin's Hall Broch, Berwickshire

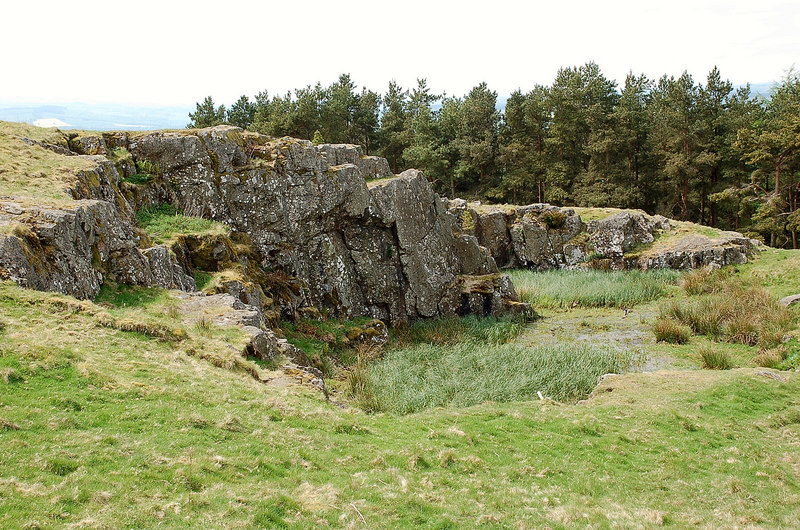
Rock outcrop and pond, Peniel Heugh summit

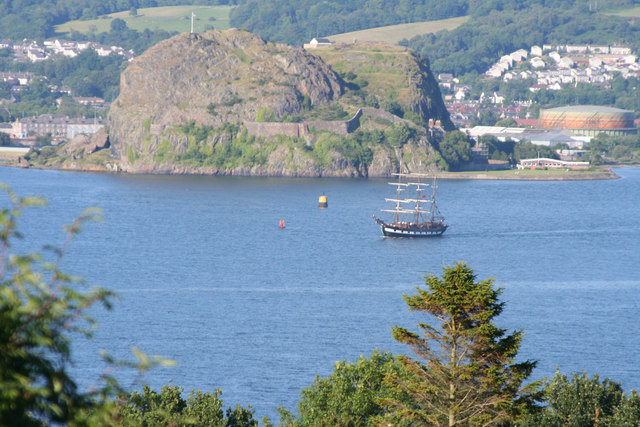
Dumbarton Rock on Clyde Water

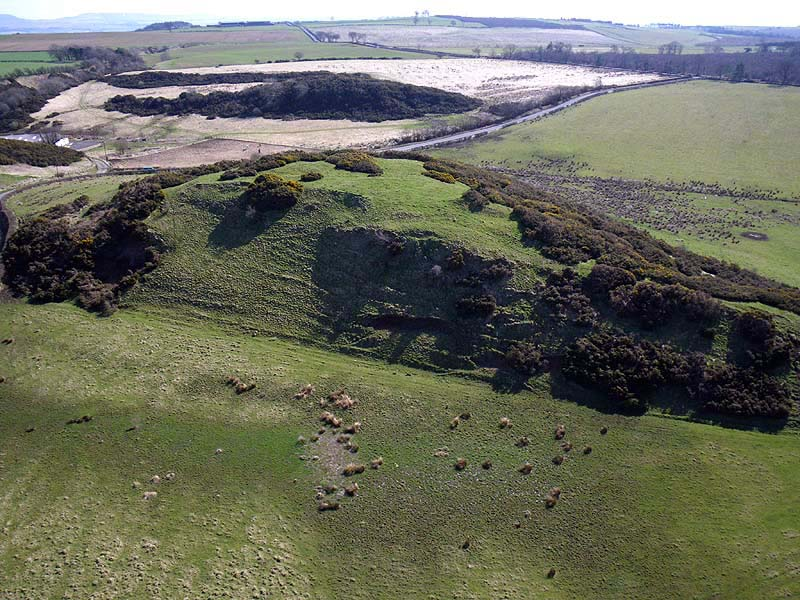
Kite aerial photo of Peace Knowe in West Lothian

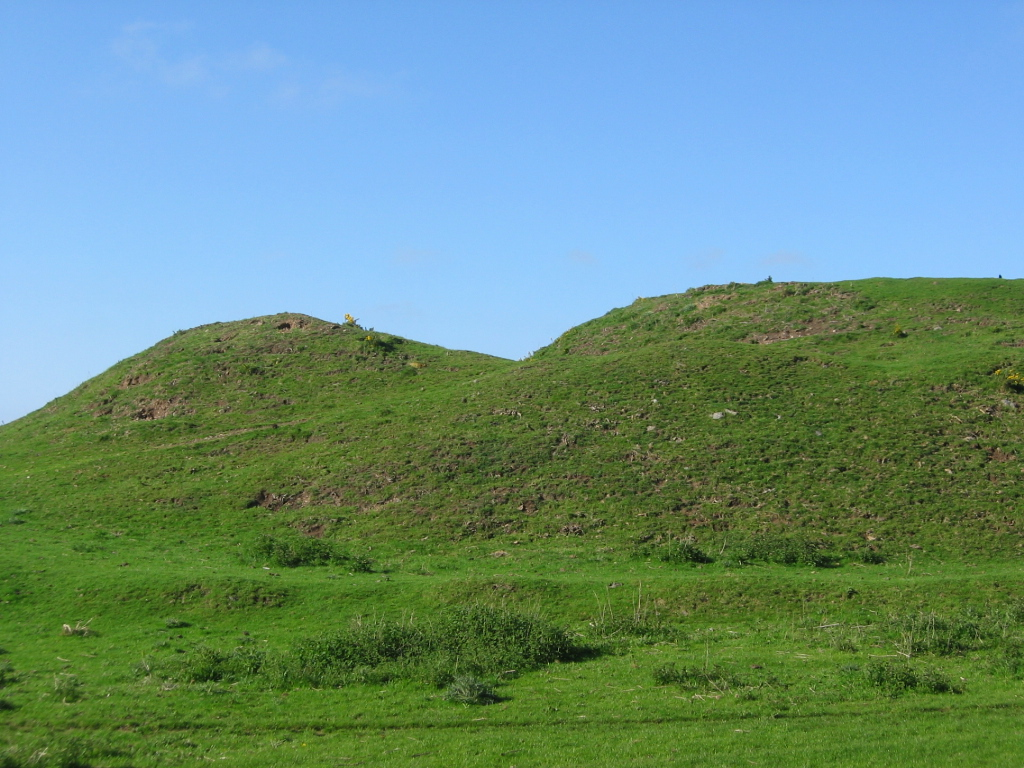
Chesters Hill Fort, East Lothian

Dry stone remains of White Catherun, out by Brechin

This article lists a few selected examples of hill forts in Scotland. The remains of at least 1,695 hillforts have been counted throughout the country as a whole, most predominantly on the Scottish mainland, and also including on some of the Scottish islands. One of the highest concentrations of historic hillforts in Europe, according to the Trimontium Trust, is in the Scottish Borders, including particularly in the historic county of Berwickshire. Hill forts in Scotland typically date from the Bronze and Iron Ages, but post-Roman inhabitation of many sites is also important. The remains today typically survive only as earthworks with occasional traces of structural stone in varying quantity. Remains of vitrified forts are also found throughout Scotland.

== Aberdeenshire ==
- Barmekin of Echt
- Barra Hill
- Mither Tap
- Dunnicaer
- Dunnideer
- Tap o' Noth

== Angus ==
- The Caterthuns

== Argyll and Bute ==
- An Caisteal, Coll
- Dùn Cholla, Colonsay
- Dùn Dubh, Coll
- Dùn Eibhinn, Colonsay
- Dùn Meadhonach, Colonsay
- Dùn Morbhaidh, Coll
- Dunadd, Argyll
- Dun Skeig, Kintyre
- The Doon (Drumadoon), Arran

== Dumfries and Galloway ==
- Doon of May
- Grennan Hill
- Tynron Doon

== East Lothian ==
- Black Castle
- Blackcastle Hill
- Chesters Hill Fort (Historic Scotland)
- Kae Heughs, near Haddington
- Kidlaw, near Dalkeith
- Traprain Law
- White Castle

== City of Edinburgh ==
- Arthur's Seat
- Blackford Hill

== Fife ==
- Clatchard Craig
- Norman's Law

== Highland ==
- Dunearn
- Dun Cruinn
- Dun Evan
- Dun Ringill
- Dun Skudiburgh
- Craig Phadrig, Inverness

== Midlothian ==
- Castle Law

== Moray ==
- Cluny Hill
- Doune of Relugas
- Knock of Alves

== Perth and Kinross ==
- Moredun Top hill fort, Moncreiffe Hill
- Dundurn

== Scottish Borders ==
According to the Trimontium Trust, the area of the Scottish Borders lays claim to as many as 408 identifiable hillfort sites, one of the highest concentrations in Europe.

- Addinston
- Black Meldon
- Broxmouth (destroyed)
- Bunkle Edge (Drakemire hillforts) series of linked hillforts running along a ridge north of the B6438 from Reston to Preston
- Chester Hill, Burnmouth
- Cockburn Law
- Colud's Fort, Kirk Hill (Colodaesburg), St Abb's Head
- Duns Law ("Covenanter's Camp"), Duns
- Earns Heugh
- Edin's Hall Broch (Historic Scotland)
- Eildon Hill
- Fosterland Burn
- Gordon Castle, Bogle Plantation, Gordon
- Habchester, Bastleridge
- Hirsel Law
- Milkieston Rings
- Mutiny Stones
- Northshield Rings
- Peniel Heugh
- Primrose Hill Fort
- Raecleugh Head
- Tollis Hill
- White Meldon

== South Lanarkshire ==
- Black Hill (National Trust for Scotland)

== Stirling ==
- Castle Law, Dumyat
- Gillies Hill

== West Dunbartonshire ==
- Dumbarton Rock

== West Lothian ==
- Bowden Hill, near Linlithgow
- Castlethorn, or Canniewell Slack, Torphichen
- Cockleroy
- Dechmont Law, possible hill fort remains
- Peace Knowe, by Ochiltree

== Western Isles ==
- Dùn Èistean

== See also ==
- David Christison
- List of castles in Scotland
- Hillforts in Scotland
- Hillforts in Britain
- Hillfort of Otzenhausen
- List of hillforts on the Isle of Man
- List of hillforts in Northern Ireland
- List of hillforts in Ireland
- List of hillforts in Wales
- List of hillforts in Monmouthshire
- List of hillforts in England
- List of hillforts and ancient settlements in Somerset
- Forts in Cornwall
- List of hillforts in Latvia
