= Knock of Alves =

Hill in Moray, Scotland

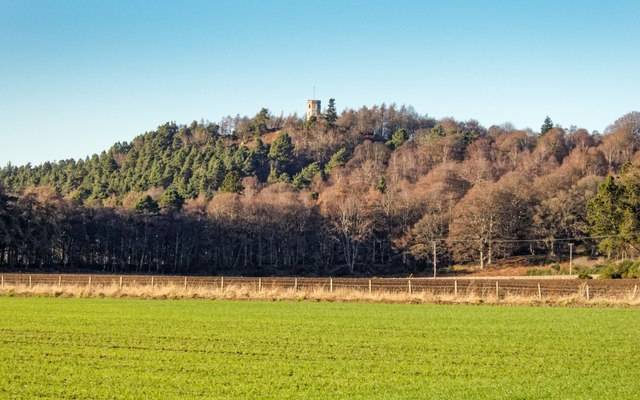
- Looking across to Knock of Alves from the south with York Tower on the summit.

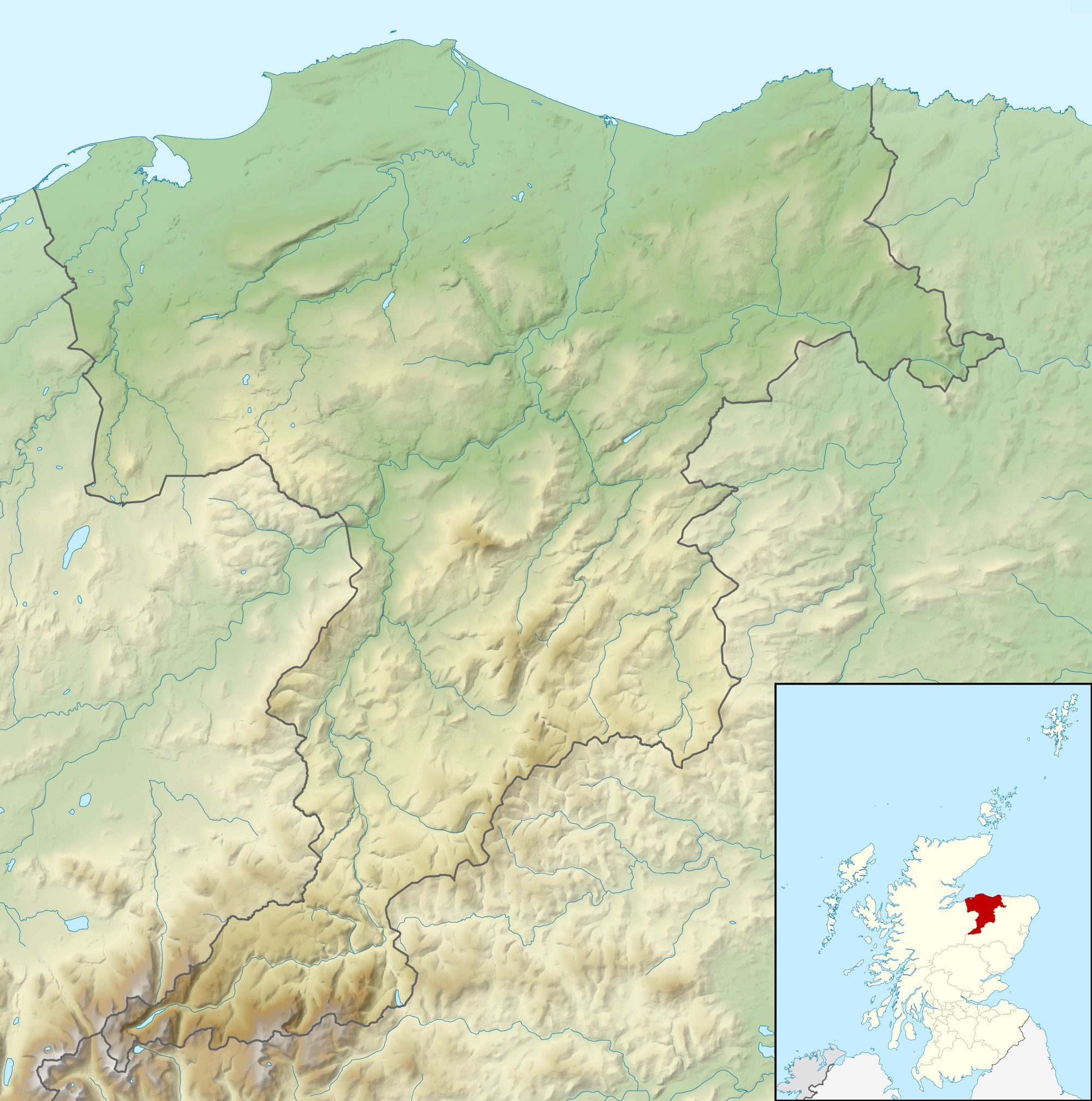
- Location within Moray
- 57.648°N 3.4040°W
- Type: Hill fort, Stone circle

Site notes
- Material: Stone, earth
- Height: 335 feet (102 m) AOD

The Knock of Alves is a small wooded hill that lies 3 miles (4.8 km) to the west of Elgin in Moray, Scotland, rising to 335 feet (102 m) above ordnance datum. Its summit is marked by York Tower, a 3-storey octagonal folly erected in 1827 to commemorate Prince Frederick, the Duke of York; and the Forteath Mausoleum, built in 1850 as the burial place of 7 members of the Forteath family of the nearby house of Newton.

The hill is the site of a hill fort with evidence of both Iron Age and Pictish occupation. It is traditionally believed that there was an early Christian church, possibly Culdean, on top of the hill, though no traces of this have been found.

On the south side of the hill, approximately 200 metres (660 ft) from York Tower and the summit, is a stone circle consisting of six boulders of up to 1.3 metres (4.3 ft) in height, arranged with an overall diameter of 10 metres (33 ft).

== Hill fort ==
The hill is the site of a hill fort commonly classed as a member of a group that also includes Craig Phadrig and Knock Farril to the west and Tap o' Noth and Dunnideer to the south east. These are characterised as massively constructed oblong forts, commonly exhibiting evidence of vitrification. The remains of the fort are now heavily mutilated and defaced and have been damaged by the building of the tower and mausoleum; by erosion from the provision of access roads; by root damage, animal burrowing and slope wash.

The fort was surveyed by the Royal Commission on the Ancient and Historical Monuments of Scotland in 1957. The innermost enclosure measured 125 feet (38 m) from east to west and 75 feet (23 m) from north to south and was marked by crestlines and boulders to the east and south, and by more conspicuous though still ruined remains of a wall to the west and north. This was contained within a second enclosure measuring 415 feet (126 m) by 75 feet (23 m) that was marked by a clear line of large facing stones along the south west. The entrance to both enclosures lay on the east, and the smaller enclosure may therefore have been a later structure built over the ruins of the larger one. A third wall surrounded both inner enclosures and was represented only by tumbled stones to the east and north, but by a more substantial scarp studded with stones and boulders to the west and south.

Two outer ramparts run around the lower slopes of the hill. These were made up of rubble and earth, with the inner enclosing an area measuring 500 feet (150 m) from east to west and 180 feet (55 m) from north to south, and the outer lying 18 feet (5.5 m) further out for most of its length.

Excavations in 2016 revealed postholes in the upper citadel containing deposits dating from 400 to 200 BC and 520-370 BC, while the lower ramparts around the base of the hill contained deposits dating from 330 to 540 AD. This suggests that the site was occupied during the Iron Age, but then reoccupied and refortified between the later 4th and early 6th centuries during the early medieval period.

== Gallery ==
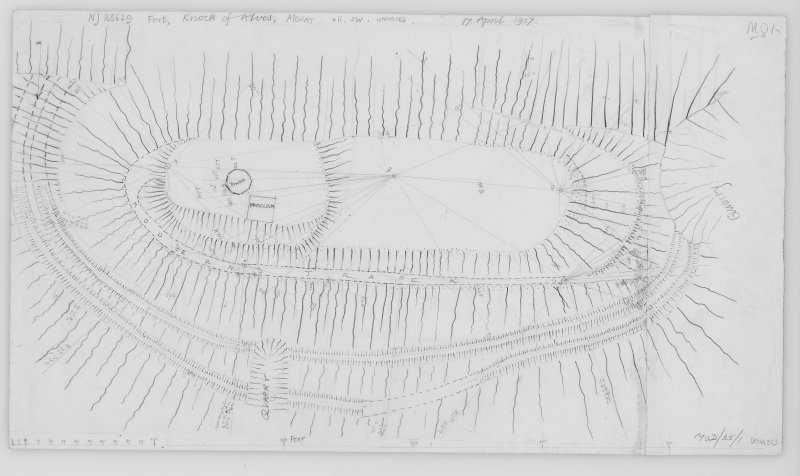
1957 survey of the hill fort

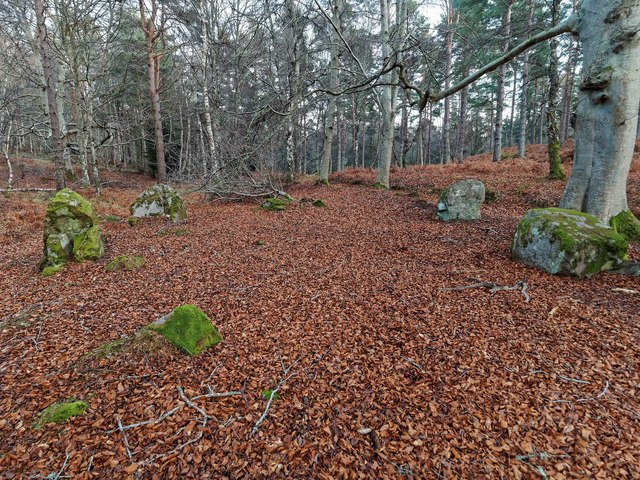
Stone circle, 200m south of the summit

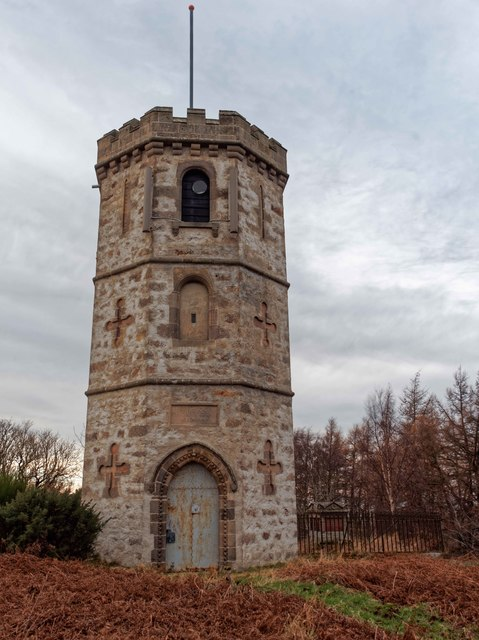
York Tower, built on the summit in 1827

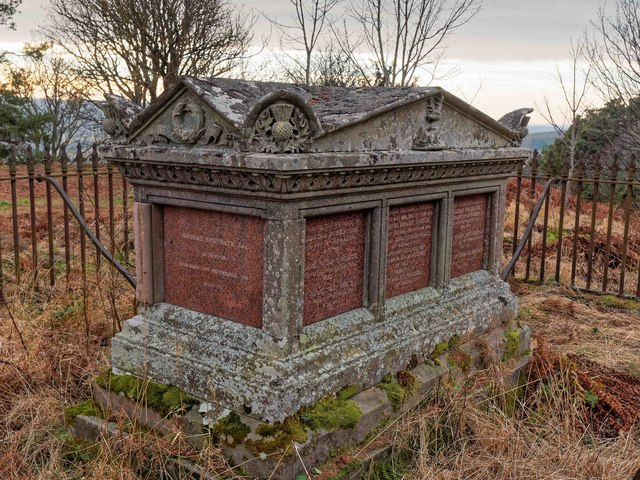
The Forteath Mausoleum, built in 1850

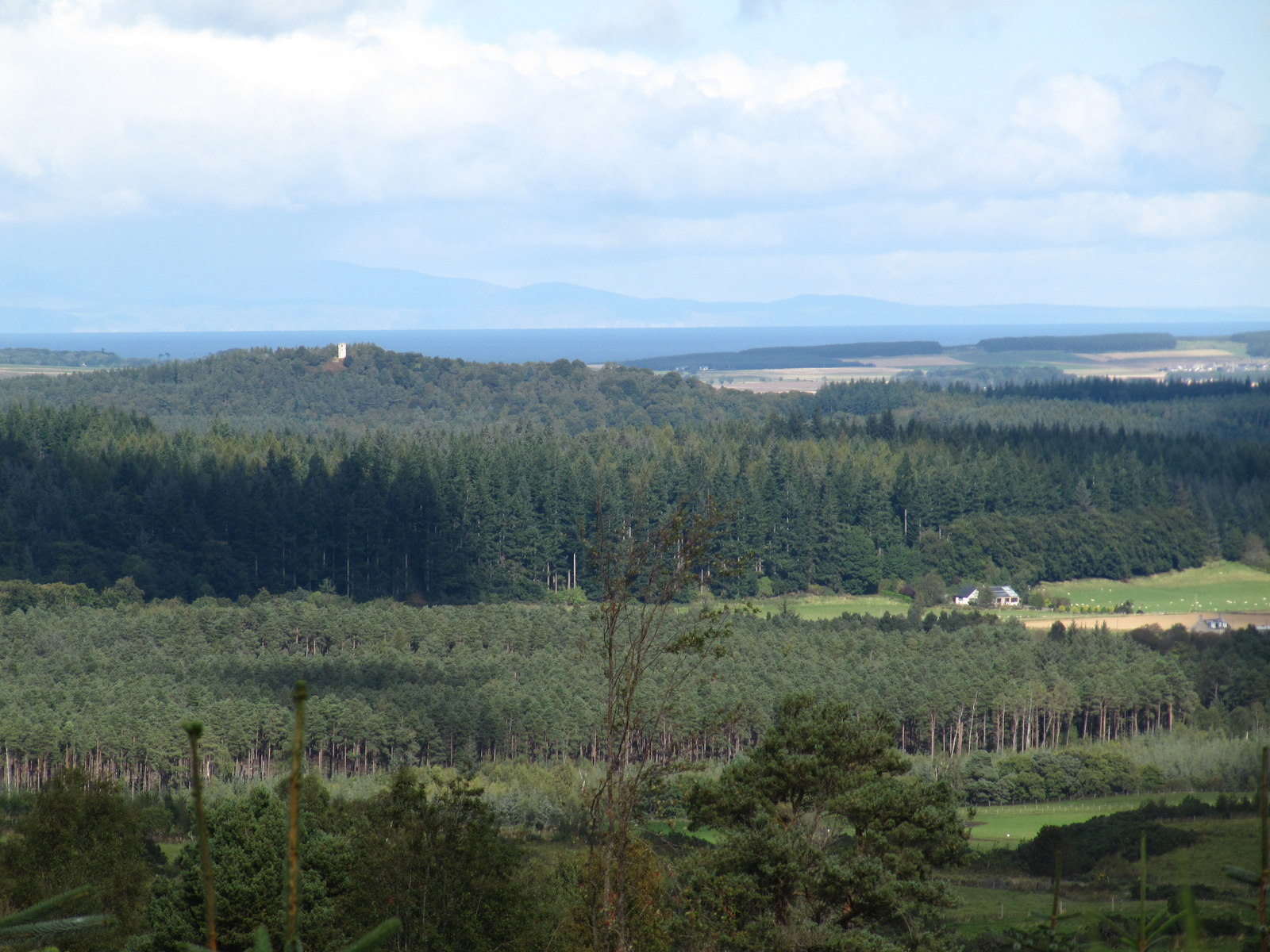
View from Buinach Hill to the south, with the Moray Firth and the hills of Sutherland beyond
