= Mither Tap hillfort =

Hill fort in Aberdeenshire, Scotland

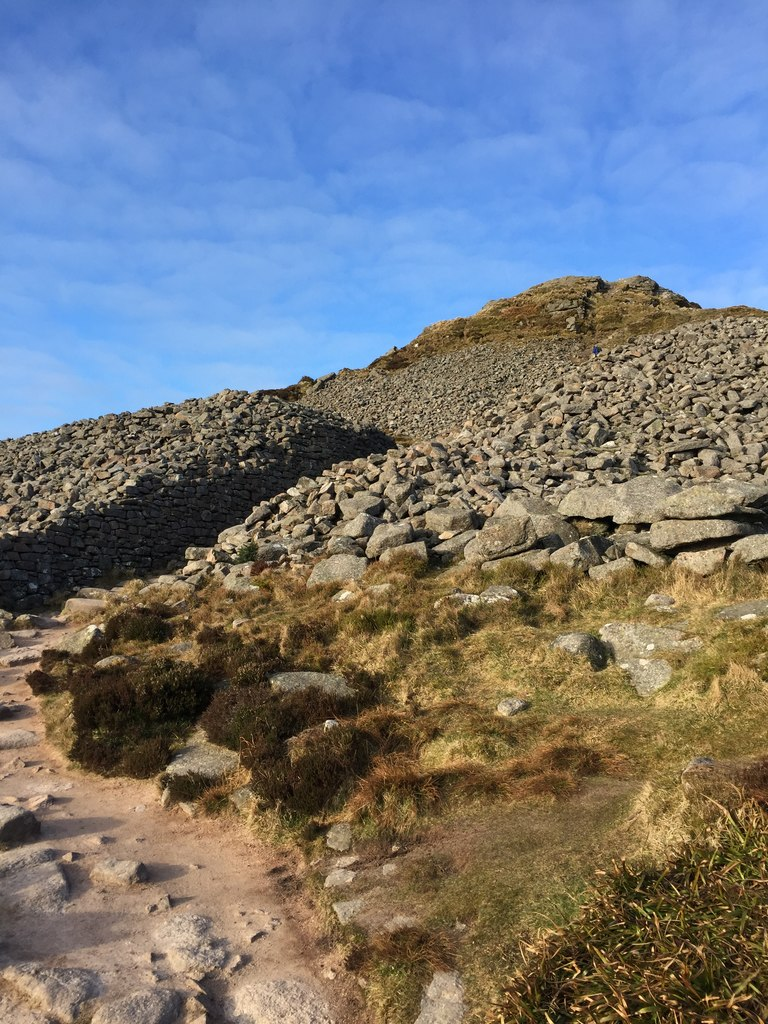
- Taken from the path to the summit, showing collapsed stone ramparts
- Interactive map of Mither Tap hillfort
- 57.29097°N 2.52867°W
- Type: hillfort
- Periods: Prehistoric, Early Medieval (Pictish)
- Location: Aberdeenshire, Scotland

History
- Built: Prehistoric

Site notes
- Excavation dates: 1870s (Christian Maclagan), 2007 (survey), 2019 (Northern Picts Project)
- Archaeologists: Christian Maclagan, Dan Atkinson, Northern Picts Project (University of Aberdeen)

The Mither Tap hillfort is a prehistoric stone-walled fortification located on the summit of Mither Tap, a prominent granite outcrop on the eastern side of the Bennachie range in Aberdeenshire, Scotland.

The site features stone ramparts, complex entrance arrangements, and evidence of multiple construction phases, indicating that it developed from early enclosures into a substantial settlement with both defensive and domestic functions.

== Location ==
The Mither Tap hillfort occupies the summit and upper slopes of Mither Tap, the second-highest hill in the Bennachie range.

== Structure ==
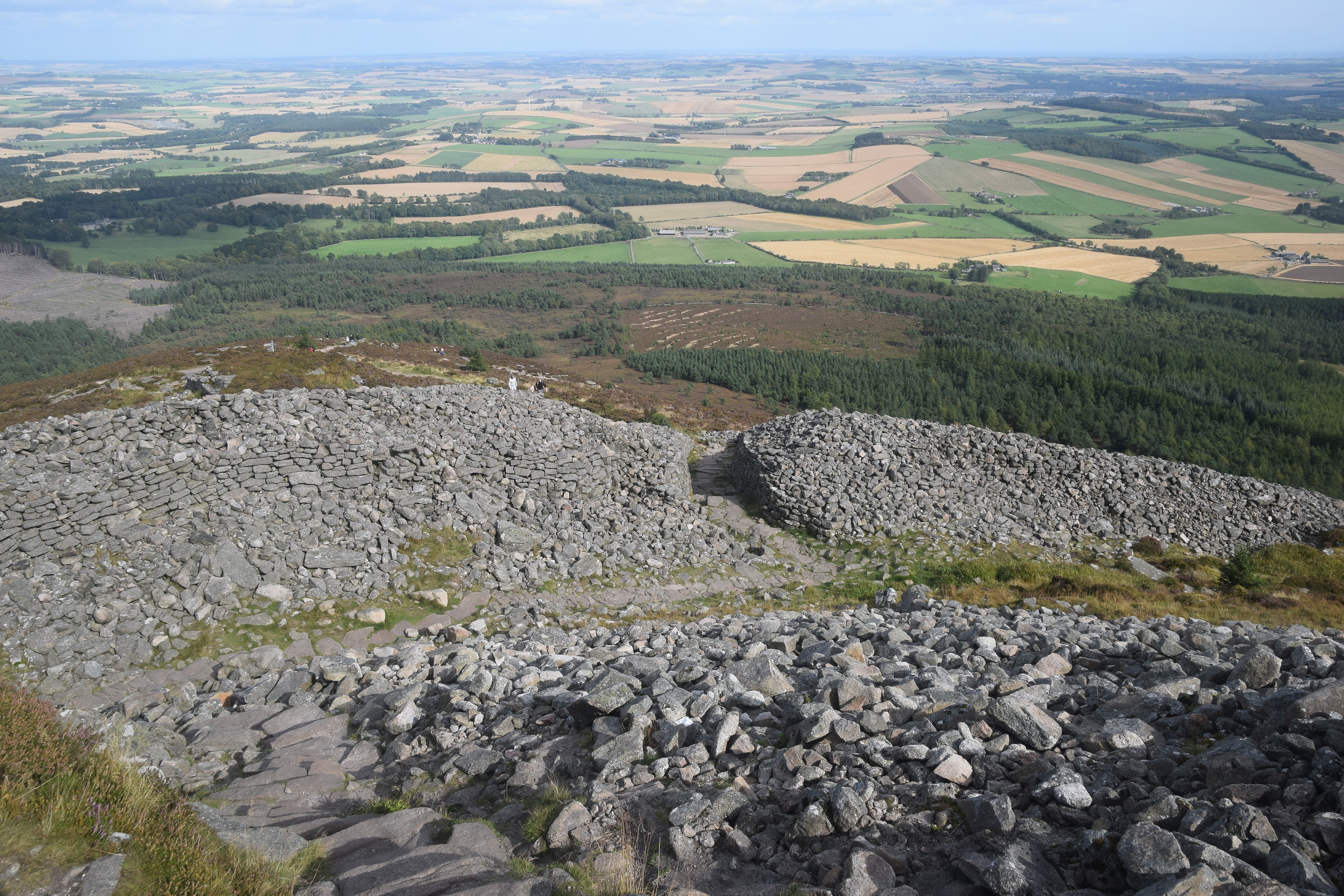
View from the summit showing mostly the outer rampart of the Mither Tap hillfort; the inner rampart is also visible at the bottom of the image.

The fort consists of two stone ramparts: an inner rampart surrounding the summit outcrop and the outer rampart positioned slightly lower down the slopes. Most of the masonry has collapsed, but the rampart lines remain visible.

Terraced platforms cut into the hillside suggest domestic use, with circular and rectangular foundations that may have supported roundhouses or other buildings. A well in the lower citadel, recorded in a 19th-century survey by Christian Maclagan, held water until it was later filled in during the 20th century.

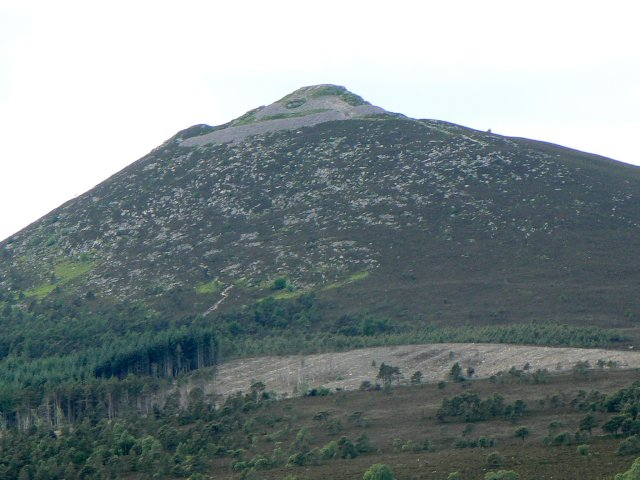
Mither Tap viewed from the base, showing both inner and outer ramparts.

The inner rampart closely follows the granite outcrop at the summit and defines a small summit area that is largely shaped by the outcrop itself.

The outer rampart lies lower on the slope and encloses a larger area. Although much of its stonework has collapsed downslope, its line can still be traced clearly around the hill.

The main entrance, located on the northeast side, features a long, stone-lined passage. Sources suggest this passage may have been protected by additional outer defences.

== Archaeology ==
=== 19th Century ===
In the 1870s, the archaeologist Christian Maclagan conducted one of the earliest investigations. She later published a detailed plan in 1881 that illustrated the upper and lower ramparts, possible round structures in both citadels, and the location of a well in the lower citadel.

=== 21st Century ===
A 2007 watching brief was conducted at the same time of the building of a new path near the entrance of the fort, funded by Forestry Commission Scotland, with Dan Atkinson credited as the archaeologist.

Near the forts’s entrance, a stone block was found, likely related to an earlier post-medieval or modern path. Just inside the entrance, two stone blocks were exposed crossing the path tray (the shallow trench created for a new path). Below them was a compact spread of cobbles. They excavated a small sondage below the cobbles, finding a gravelly-silt deposit directly on bedrock.

This deposit was interpreted as the floor or surface of a building, which may correspond to roundhouses suggested by 19th-century investigations. Multiple fragments of oak charcoal were recovered from the deposit, and were radiocarbon-dated to AD 340-540 and AD 640-780. North of the sondage was a loose concentration of heat-affected stones (but not vitrified) interpreted as collapsed rubble.

In June 2019, the Northern Picts project based in the University of Aberdeen began excavations in the fort. They created 7 trenches in multiple places around the fort.

Trench 1, positioned on the outer rampart, revealed a building platform raised about 1.5 meters above the original rampart base. The base was constructed from large granite slabs resting on mounds of rubble. A midden deposit was also found, containing cattle, sheep and fish bones, suggesting domestic activity.

Trench 2 investigated the well recorded by Maclagan. Excavation uncovered a rectangular, stone-lined structure with steps keyed into the rampart’s stonework, indicating it was integrated into the fort’s design. A clay lining was also found, possibly part of the original waterproofing.

Trench 3 was opened on the south-east side, over what had previously been interpreted as part of the outer bank. During excavation, the team noted that the stonework may not have belonged to a defensive bank. Instead, it may form part of a sub-rectangular building, placed just inside the outer citadel. However, the authors of the published summary noted that larger trenches would be needed to confirm whether the stonework is indeed part of a building rather than an incomplete defensive wall.

Fragments of iron, an intact crucible, and slag were recovered, indicating metalworking activity. Alongside handmade pottery sherds, these finds suggest domestic or industrial use within the fort rather than solely defensive functions.

Trench 4 was positioned in the upper citadel. The team recovered animal bone fragments, teeth, charcoal, and artefacts, including a gaming piece recovered from clayey-silt layers, suggesting domestic or leisure use.

Trench 5 was positioned on the southern side of the central tor. Immediately beneath the soil was a silty-sand layer containing modern glass, large pieces of charcoal, and a small fragment of corroded metal, suggesting a recent disturbance. Directly over bedrock, there were also concentrated pockets of heat-affected soil, indicating that fires were used repeatedly in this part of the fort.

Trench 6 was positioned on the northern side of the inner citadel. Beneath the thin overburden was a clayey-silt occupation deposit containing moderate charcoal and stones, within which they noted a number of flat stones forming a level surface. The flat stones may represent a constructed surface or pathway, though their date and function remain uncertain.

Trench 7 was positioned outside the fort on the northern side; its aim was to investigate a line of boulders and large stones. Immediately adjacent to the boulders, archaeologists recorded a deep peaty topsoil overlying a clayey-sand layer that contained frequent charcoal.

== History ==
The fort is likely to have originated in prehistory, but shows clear evidence of occupation between the 4th and 8th centuries AD, during the early medieval Pictish period.

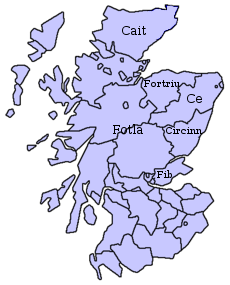
Map showing the Pictish Kingdoms, with the Kingdom of Cé in the northeast.

It has been suggested that the site may have been an important centre within the Pictish territory of Cé, based on place-name evidence and later historical tradition. The name ‘Bennachie’ has been interpreted by some scholars as deriving from Benne Cé (“mountain of Cé”), while others argue it comes from the Gaelic Beinn na Cìche (“hill of the breast”), referring to the summit’s distinctive shape.

Archaeological evidence, including metalworking debris and high-status artefacts, indicates that Mither Tap was more than a defensive site; it was a regional power centre and possibly a hub for ceremonial or elite activity.

== See also ==
- Bennachie
- Hillforts in Scotland
- Picts
