= Bennachie =

Range of hills in Aberdeenshire, Scotland

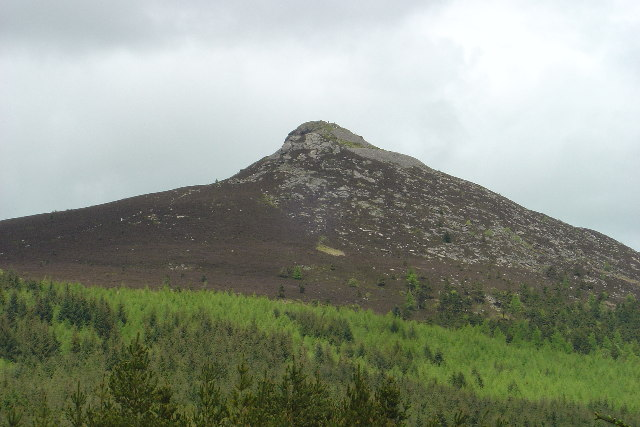
- Mither Tap from the south

Highest point
- Peak: Oxen Craig
- Elevation: 1,732 ft (528 m)
- Prominence: 1,037 ft (316 m)
- Listing: Marilyn
- Coordinates: 57.29275°N 2.56244°W

Naming
- English translation: Hill of the breast
- Language of name: Gaelic
- Pronunciation: English: /bɛnæˈhiː/

Geography
- Location within Scotland
- Location: Aberdeenshire, Scotland
- OS grid: NJ662226
- Topo map: OS Landranger 38

Bennachie (/bɛnəˈxiː/ ben-ə-HEE; Scottish Gaelic: Beinn na Cìche) is a range of hills in Aberdeenshire, Scotland. It has several tops, the highest of which, Oxen Craig, has a height of 528 metres (1,732 ft). Though not particularly high compared to other peaks in Scotland, the mountain is very prominent owing to its isolation and the relative flatness of the surrounding terrain, and dominates the skyline from several viewpoints.

The peak that stands out the most visually is Mither Tap (518 m, 1699 feet) and from its top there are good views of the county to the north and east. Most of the tops lie along an east / west ridge, with the exception of Millstone Hill (409 m) an outlier or spur which is separated from and to the south of the main ridge. Mither Tap has an Iron Age hillfort on its summit. Unlike with many other hilltop forts in the area, there are no signs of vitrification in the stone. Bennachie is visible from a number of distant points; to the north it is visible from Longman Hill, a point considerably to the north.

== Etymology ==
The etymology of Bennachie is uncertain. Suggestions include "Initially Beinn a Cioch, the hill of the nipple or pap." It has also been translated as the "‘Mountain of Ce’", a king mentioned in the List of legendary kings of Pictland.

== History of the area ==
From 1800 to 1859 common land on the east side of Bennachie was home to a community of squatters known locally as the Colony. A small number of families led a crofting life often doing skilled work, such as dyking and quarrying, for local landowners. After 1859 the Colony dwindled as the common land was broken up and divided amongst the local estates. However, the last of the original colonists, George Esson, lived on the hill until his death in the 1930s. Visitors to Bennachie can explore the remains of the Colony and extensive work is being done on site and amongst local parish records to determine the history of the Colonists.

=== Mither Tap ===
In the 1870s Christian Maclagan, an early Scottish archaeologist, surveyed and conducted excavations at Mither Tap in 1876 and 1881.

In 2019 the University of Aberdeen Northern Picts Project conducted an excavation at Mither Tap.

It has been suggested as a possible site of the battle of Mons Graupius.

== Paths and environment ==
The range of hills is frequently visited by walkers, as it is relatively close to Aberdeen. The Gordon Way is a waymarked trail that traverses the Southern flank of Bennachie between the Visitors Centre in the East and Suie Car Park to the West. Most of the Bennachie range is owned by Forestry and Land Scotland, which maintains a network of paths on and around the hills, several car parks and a visitor centre located at the eastern foot of the range. A volunteer conservation charity, the Bailies of Bennachie, founded in 1973, helps with this work and with other environmental and archaeological activities on the hill. There are several marked paths, including fairly easy ascents of Oxen Craig and Mither Tap that start from the centre.

In 2023, the Bailies of Bennachie received the Community Initiative Award at RSPB Scotland's Nature of Scotland Awards 2023.

== See also ==
- Macaulayite, a mineral known from only one place in the world, at the foot of Bennachie.
- Breast-shaped hill
- Christian Maclagan
- Tap o' Noth Pictish hillfort

== Gallery ==
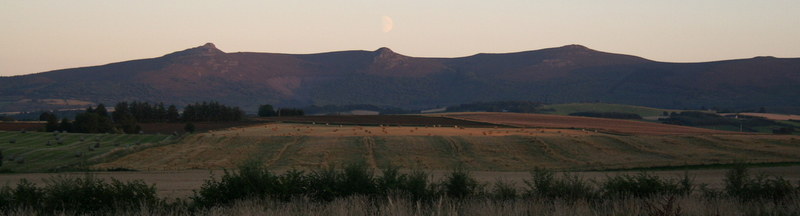
Bennachie from the North. Peaks are from left to right: Mither Tap, Craigshannoch, Bruntwood Tap, Oxen Craig, Watch Craig.

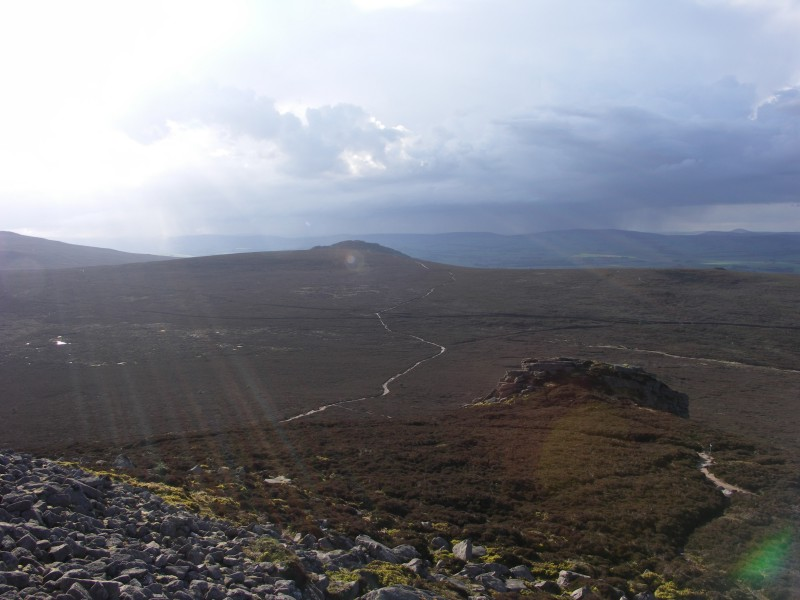
Oxen Craig from Mither Tap

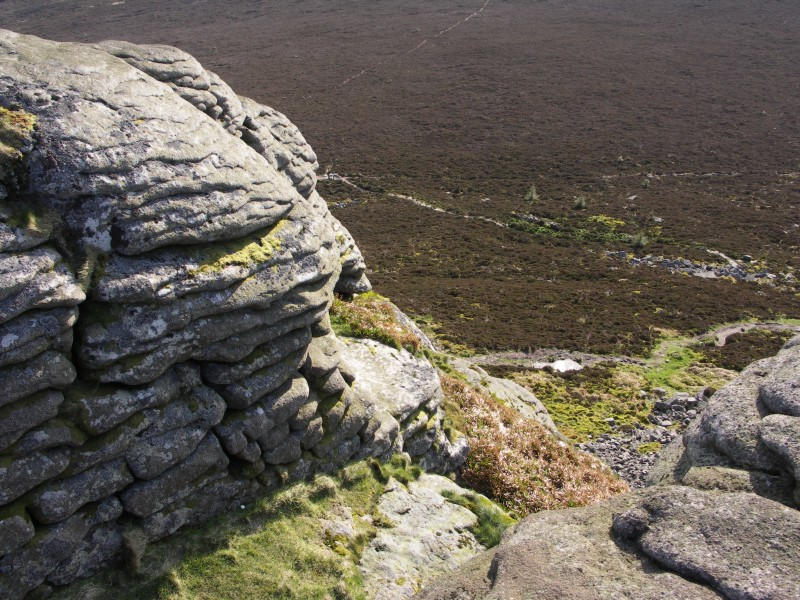
View north from Mither Tap

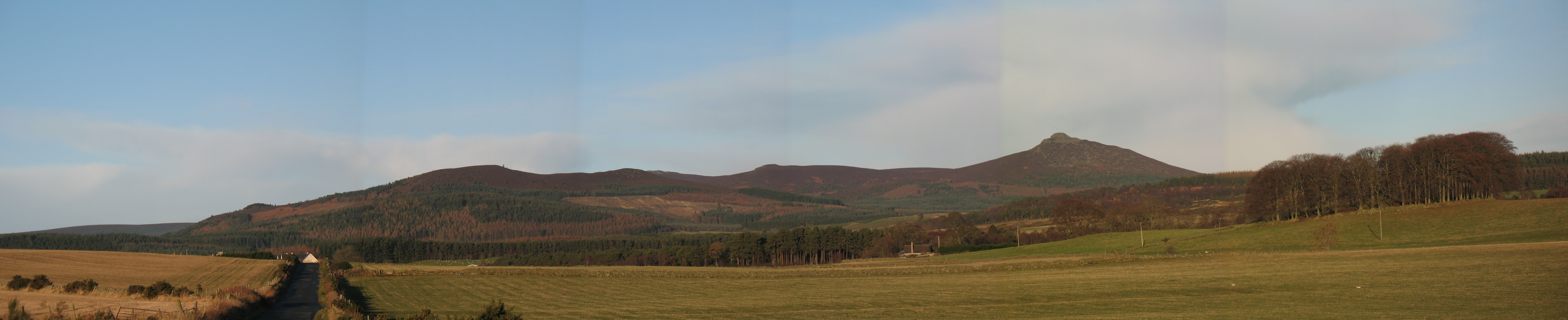
Bennachie viewed from the South, with the peak of Mither Tap to the right.

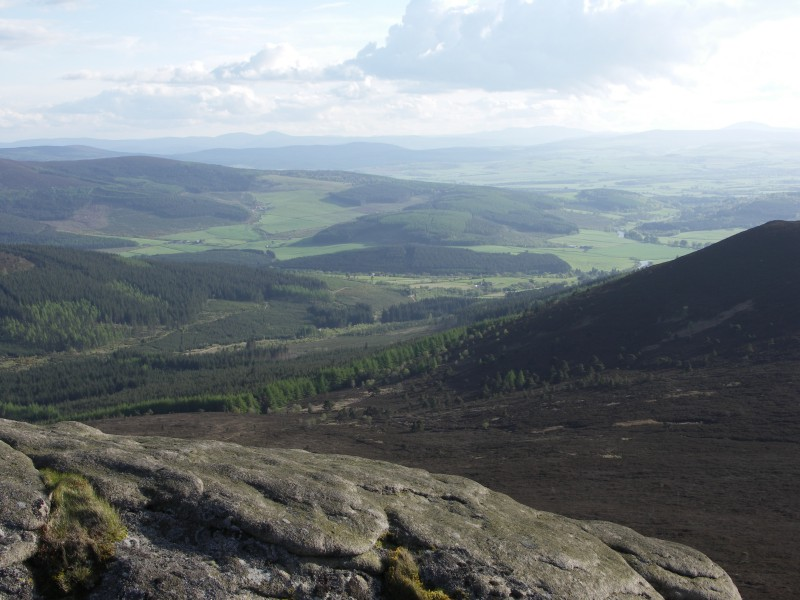
View from the summit of Mither Tap
