= Forts in Cornwall =

There are over 80 hillforts in Cornwall dating from the Iron Age, Roman and post-Roman periods, with most showing evidence of occupation and re-occupation by the Cornish Cornovii tribe. Two of the most impressive, at opposite ends of Cornwall, are Chûn Castle, near Penzance and Warbstow Bury in North East Cornwall. Others can be found at Caer Bran, Castle An Dinas (Goss Moor), Castle an Dinas (Penzance), Castle Canyke, Kelly Rounds, Cadson Bury, Resugga Castle, Helsbury near Michaelstow, St Dennis, Gear fort, Lescudjack Hillfort, Prideaux Castle, and Castle Dore.

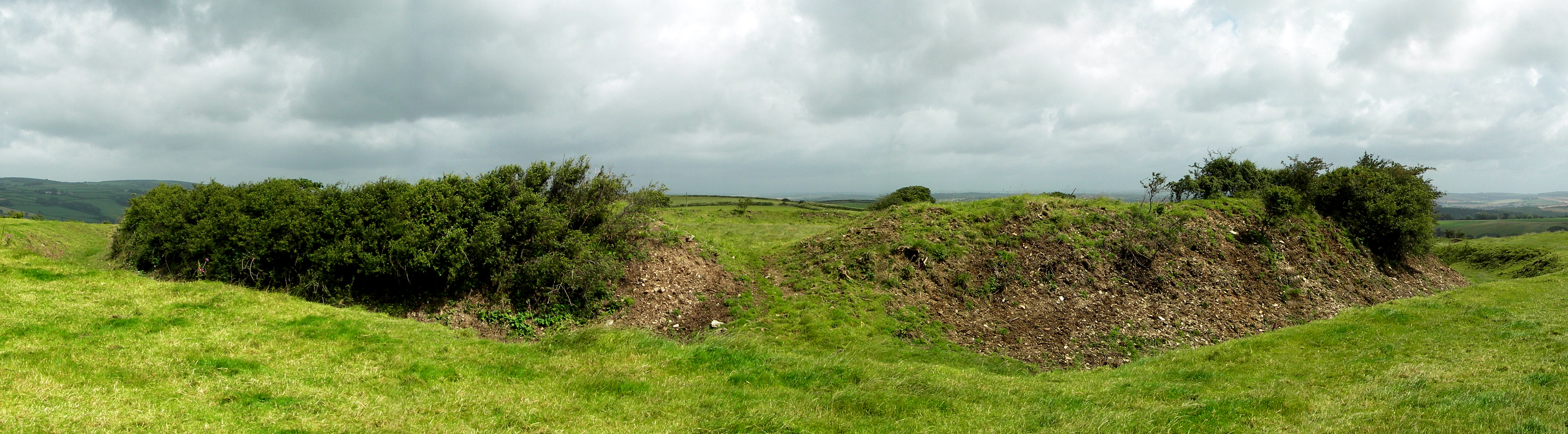
Panorama of Castle Dore, Cornwall

Promontory forts or cliff top forts were also common in the Iron Age and examples of these are at Trevelgue near Newquay, Maen Castle near Sennen, St Michael's at Rame Head, Dodman Point (near Gorran Haven), Treryn Dinas (site of Logan Rock), Trereen Dinas (Gurnard's Head) and The Rumps (near St Minver).

== Modern forts ==
In Tudor times the coastal defences were strengthened (as by Henry VIII at St Mawes) and also at the time when a Spanish invasion was expected in the 1580s. Polruan also has a blockhouse fortification that guards the entrance to the river Fowey, one of a pair — its partner being situated on the Fowey side of the river. Between the two blockhouses was strung a defensive chain to prevent enemy ships entering the harbour, the chain being lowered for friendly vessels. This was primarily used during the wars with the Dutch. Many Napoleonic forts were built during the Napoleonic War in South East Cornwall to protect Plymouth Sound and Plymouth's docks in Devonport, Devon from attack: some are still in use today by the Ministry of Defence.

== See also ==
- Ringfort
- List of hillforts in England
- List of hillforts in Scotland
- List of hillforts in Wales
