= Hillforts in Scotland =

Earthworks on hilltops

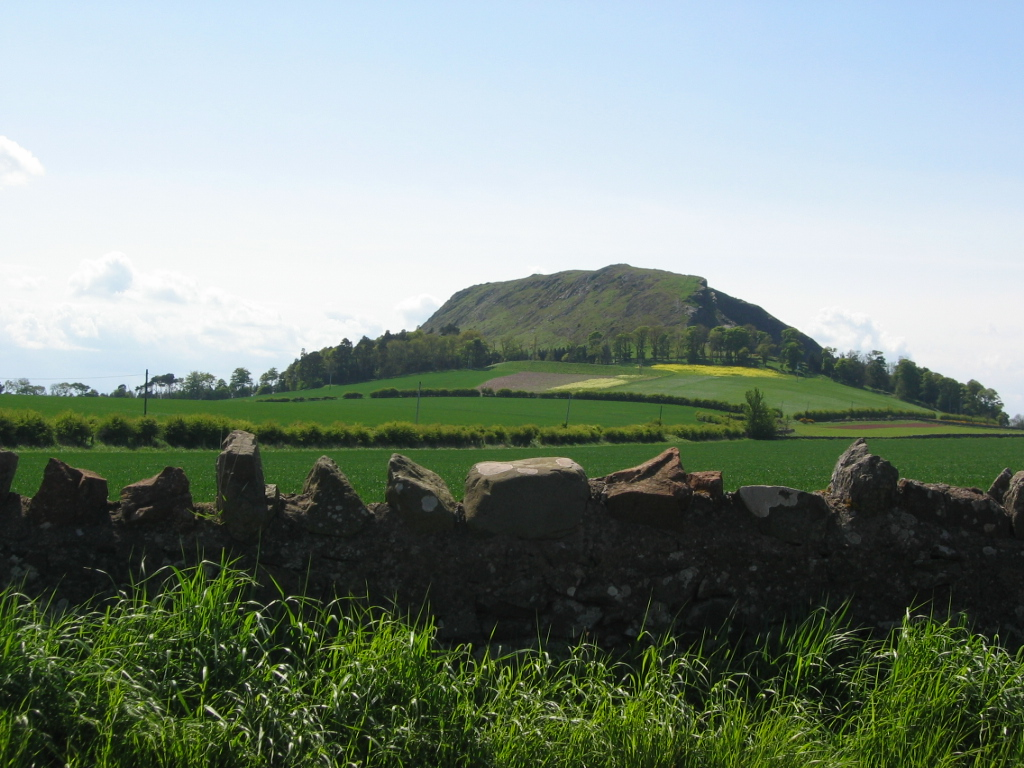
Traprain Law in East Lothian

Hillforts in Scotland are earthworks, sometimes with wooden or stone enclosures, built on higher ground, which usually include a significant settlement, built within the modern boundaries of Scotland. They were first studied in the eighteenth century and the first serious field research was undertaken in the nineteenth century. In the twentieth century there were large numbers of archaeological investigations of specific sites, with an emphasis on establishing a chronology of the forts. Forts have been classified by type and their military and ritual functions have been debated.

They were introduced into Scotland during the Bronze Age from around 1000 BCE. The largest group are from the Iron Age, with over 1,000 hillforts, mostly below the Clyde-Forth line, most of which were abandoned during the period of Roman occupation of Britain. There are also large numbers of vitrified forts, which have been subjected to fire, many of which may date to this period and are found across Scotland. After Roman occupation in the early Middle Ages some hillforts were reoccupied and petty kingdoms were often ruled from smaller nucleated forts using defensible natural features, as at Edinburgh and Dumbarton.

== Early studies ==
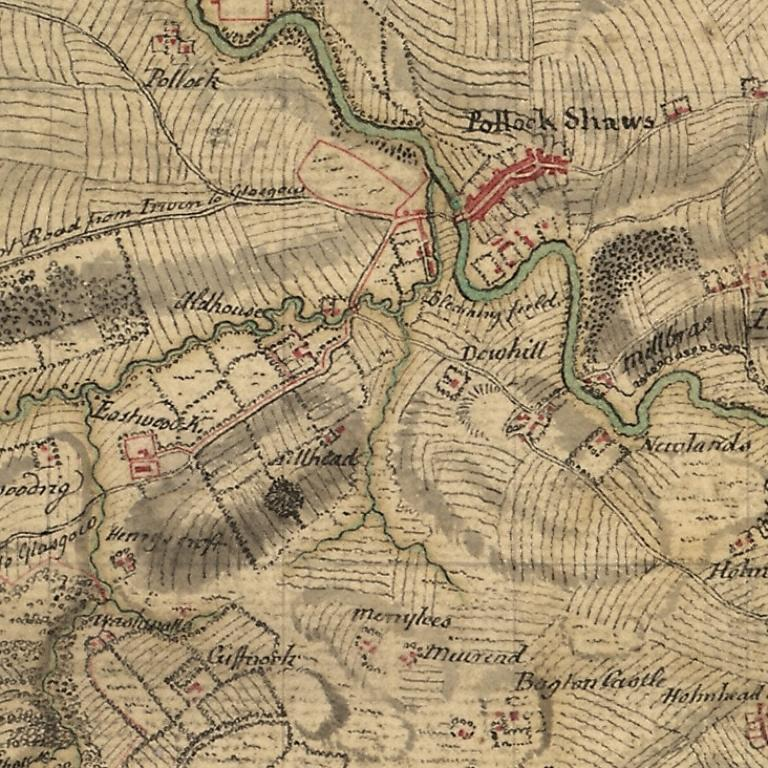
Detail from a map in General William Roy's The Military Antiquities of the Romans in Britain (1793)

The first major study of Scottish hillforts was undertaken by General William Roy and published as The Military Antiquities of the Romans in Britain in 1793. However, Roy recorded only native forts like Burnswark that had a close relationship to Roman constructions (in this case probably Roman practice siege camps), or which he wrongly attributed to be Roman in origin. George Chalmers' (1742–1825) first volume of Caledonia (1807) contained an arbitrary list of forts, but recognised that defences at Burnswark were not just in anticipation of Roman invasion, but to defend against native threats. He also recognised some of the relationships between major and subordinate sites, and the importance of intervisibility between sites. In 1851 the Scots-Canadian Daniel Wilson was the first person to use the term "pre-historic" in English, but he was dismissive of the significance of hillforts. The first serious field research in Scotland was undertaken by David Christison (1830–1912), in the decade preceding his Rhind lectures of 1894. This was the first comprehensive survey of hillforts in a region of Britain and Christison wished to stimulate further research in the subject. His work was published in 1898 as Early Fortification of Scotland and became the model for subsequent national and regional studies.

The twentieth century saw the expansion in archaeological investigations for many sites, which were used to establish a chronology of the forts that would allow them to be fitted into a "defensive sequence" of invasion and occupation. Particularly important in Northern Britain was C. M. Piggott's investigation at Hownam Rings in the Cheviots (1948). This established the "Hownam model" for Iron Age forts of progressive complexity of enclosure. These began with simple palisades, developed into stone univallate defences (with a single rampart), then more complex multivallate walls (with multiple ramparts) and then finally the abandonment of these defences for stone-built roundhouses attributed to the Pax Romana in the first or second century AD. This was challenged by Peter Hill on the basis of his excavations at Broxmouth near Edinburgh, from which he was able to suggest that the chronology of hill fort development was more complex and that stone-build houses pre-dated the arrival of the Romans. The introduction of reliable carbon dating in the late twentieth century allowed new approaches to be developed in which the defensive sequence was less prominent. The idea of developing enclosure, followed by a period of post-enclosure settlement developed in the Hownam model is still seen as having some validity.

== Classification and function ==
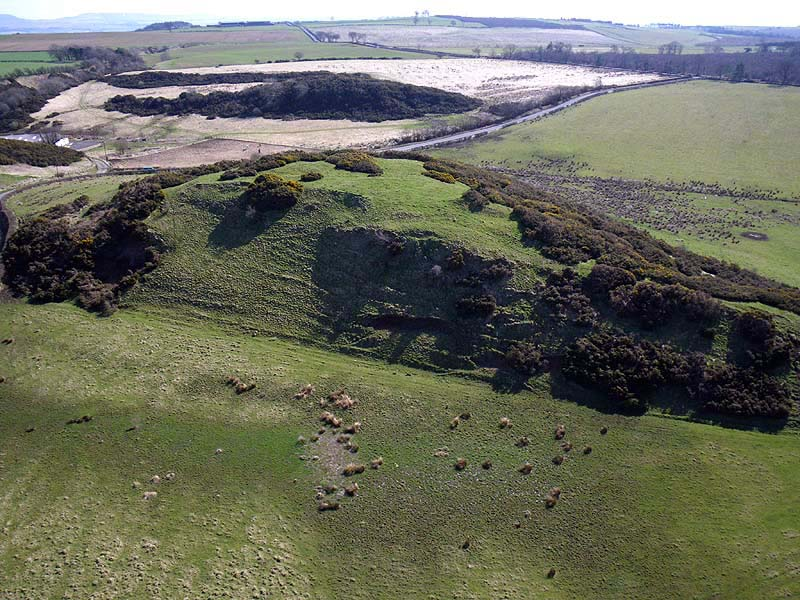
Peace Knowe Hillfort, West Lothian, photographed from the air

A. H. A. Hogg identified four types of hillfort: contour forts, promontory forts, cliff forts and ridge forts. Contour forts, where banks and ditches are moulded to the shape of the hill, are the dominant form in Scotland. Less significant are promontory forts, usually employing coastal features, such as the largest one in Scotland at the Mull of Galloway. Different types of defensive style occurred throughout the Iron Age period, some of which may have been a response to Roman siege warfare. There were different combinations in the use of earth, stone or timber. Timber was frequently in-filled with stone or other materials. In continental Europe the timber is often arranged vertically, but in Scotland horizontal timbers were more common. The function of hillforts has been much debated. It was traditionally assumed that they were primarily defensive in nature, but in the late twentieth century this view began to be questioned and social, ritual and religious functions were emphasised.

== Bronze Age ==
Bronze working spread from mainland Europe into northern Britain by about 2000 BC. As elsewhere in Britain, it was in this period that hillforts of varying size and form were first introduced. Some had timber palisades and others ditches and ramparts. These included the occupation of Eildon hill near Melrose in the Scottish Borders, from around 1000 BCE, which accommodated hundreds of houses on a fortified hilltop. Traprain Law in East Lothian, had a 20-acre enclosure, sectioned in two places west of the summit, made up of a coursed, stone wall with a rubble core. The occupation of Castle Rock at Edinburgh and Burnswark in Dumfries and Galloway, also date from this time. Additionally, there were much smaller forts that were domestic in scale and which would have housed only one or two families. The function of these forts have been debated, with some stressing their military role and others their importance as symbolic centres of local society.

== Iron Age ==
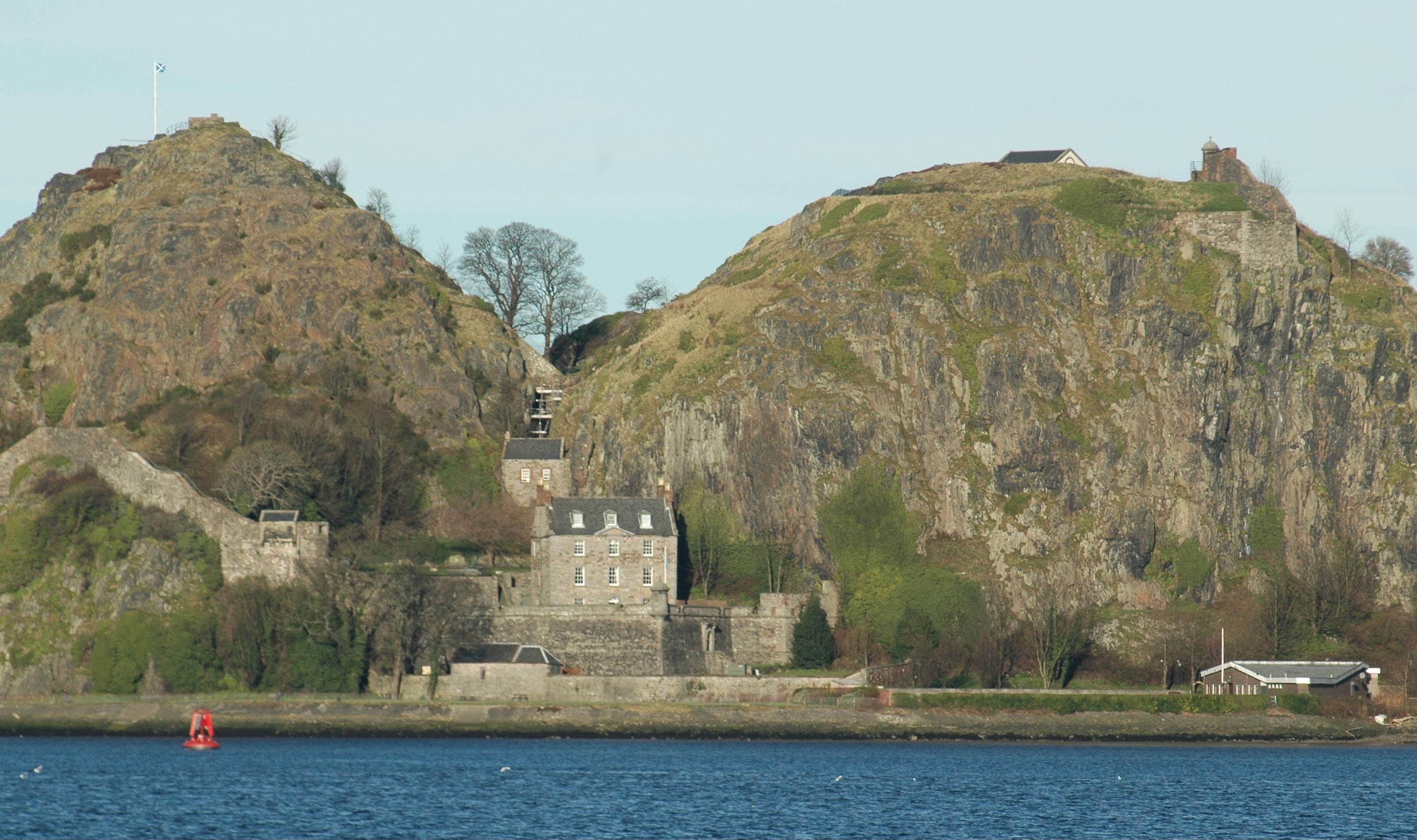
Looking north at Dumbarton Rock chief fort of Strathclyde from the 6th century to 870 when it was taken by the Vikings.

Iron working reached North Britain from about 700 BC. There is evidence for about 1,000 Iron Age hillforts in Scotland, most located south of the Clyde-Forth line. The majority are circular, with a single palisade around an enclosure. They appear to have been largely abandoned in the Roman period, both in the occupied region and further north in the regions beyond Roman control. This might have been because of the threat posed by Roman incursions, which meant that concentrations of military and political force were vulnerable to a planned attack and siege. Archaeological evidence indicates that some were reoccupied after periods of disuse.

There are also numerous vitrified forts, the walls of which have been subjected to fire, which may date to this period, but an accurate chronology has proven to be evasive. When first noted in the nineteenth century it was assumed that vitrification had been deliberately undertaken as part of the building process to harden walls, but this hypothesis was rejected by V. Gordon Childe in the 1940s and subsequent excavations have indicated that, since the debris from such walls fell on the deposits of occupation it could not have been part of the building process. Reconstructions have indicated the difficulty of deliberately firing timbers in this way, particularly in the prevailing climatic conditions in Scotland, and it is more likely that this was done as part of a process of fort destruction, either after conquest or when abandoned by the inhabitants. Extensive studies of such a fort at Finavon Hill near Forfar in Angus, suggest dates for the destruction of the site in either the last two centuries BC, or the mid-first millennium AD. Excavations at Dunnideer, Aberdeenshire indicate a date for its destruction in the period 500–250 BC.

== Early Medieval ==
For the period after the departure of the Romans in the fifth century there is evidence of a series of new forts. According to archaeologist Leslie Alcock, warfare was perhaps the "principal social activity in Early Historic northern Britain", playing a major part in "contemporary prose and poetry", and for this reason hill forts of this period have been commonly thought of as defensive structures designed to repel attack. Some became the centres of competing kingdoms. These were often smaller "nucleated" constructions compared with those from the Iron Age, sometimes utilising major geographical features, as at Edinburgh, which was probably the main fortification of the Brythonic kingdom of the Gododdin, and Dunbarton rock, who gave its Brythonic name of Alt Clut to the kingdom that dominated the Strathclyde region in the post-Roman period. The northern British peoples utilised different forms of fort and the determining factors in construction were local terrain, building materials, and politico-military needs. The first identifiable king of the Picts, Bridei mac Maelchon (r. c. 550-84) had his base at the fort of Craig Phadrig near modern Inverness. The Gaelic overkingdom of Dál Riata was probably ruled from the fortress of Dunadd, now near Kilmartin in Argyll and Bute.

== See also ==
- List of hill forts in Scotland
