= Maen Castle =

Iron Age promontory fort in Cornwall, England

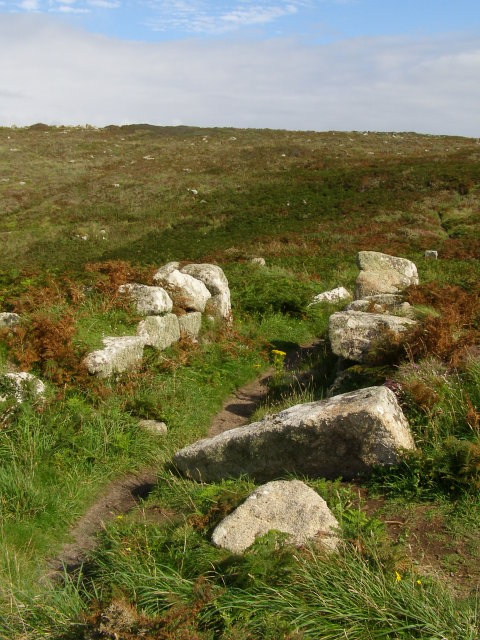
- Entrance to Maen Castle

- Location within Cornwall
- 50.073°N 5.708°W
- Location: Sennen, Cornwall, England

History
- Built: Iron Age

Scheduled monument
- Official name: Cliff castle known as Maen Castle
- Designated: 10 August 1923
- Reference no.: 421208

Maen Castle is an Iron Age promontory fort or 'cliff castle' close to Land's End in Cornwall.

== Description ==
Maen Castle is one of only two fortified sites in Cornwall where Early Iron Age pottery has been found. Excavations took place in 1939 and 1948-9 and about 300 sherds were unearthed.

The defences comprise a stone rampart, ditch and counterscarp bank built across the neck of the headland, with almost sheer cliffs on two sides and a steep slope on the third. There are some indications that the site may have been occupied before these defences were constructed.

== See also ==
- List of hill forts in England
- List of hill forts in Scotland
- List of hill forts in Wales
