= Dun Skudiburgh =

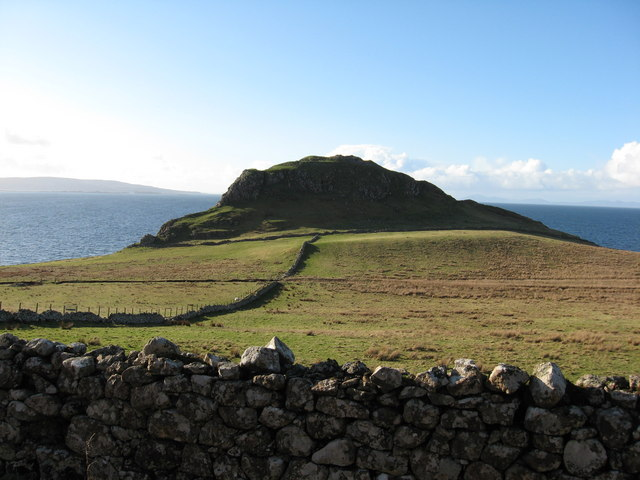
- Viewed from the east

- Location within Highland
- 57°35′45″N 6°23′48″W
- Type: Dun
- Periods: Iron Age
- Location: Near Uig, Skye, Scotland
- OS grid reference: NG 374 647

Dun Skudiburgh is a prehistoric fort near Uig, Skye, Scotland.

The site is on the west coast of Trotternish, on a steep-sided knoll about 60 metres (200 ft) above the shore of Loch Snizort.

== Description ==
The site consists of a partly vitrified fort overlaid by a dun. A ruined wall of width about 10 feet (3.0 m) encloses an oval area of about 150 feet (46 m) by 120 feet (37 m).

Outside this on the east is a wall about 320 feet (98 m) long, and on the north are two shorter walls. There is an entrance between the outer of these walls and the wall to the east.

It is thought there were at least two phases of construction of the dun: walls of poorer quality have been discerned to the west, south and south-east.
