= Gordon Way =

Hiking trail in Aberdeenshire, Scotland

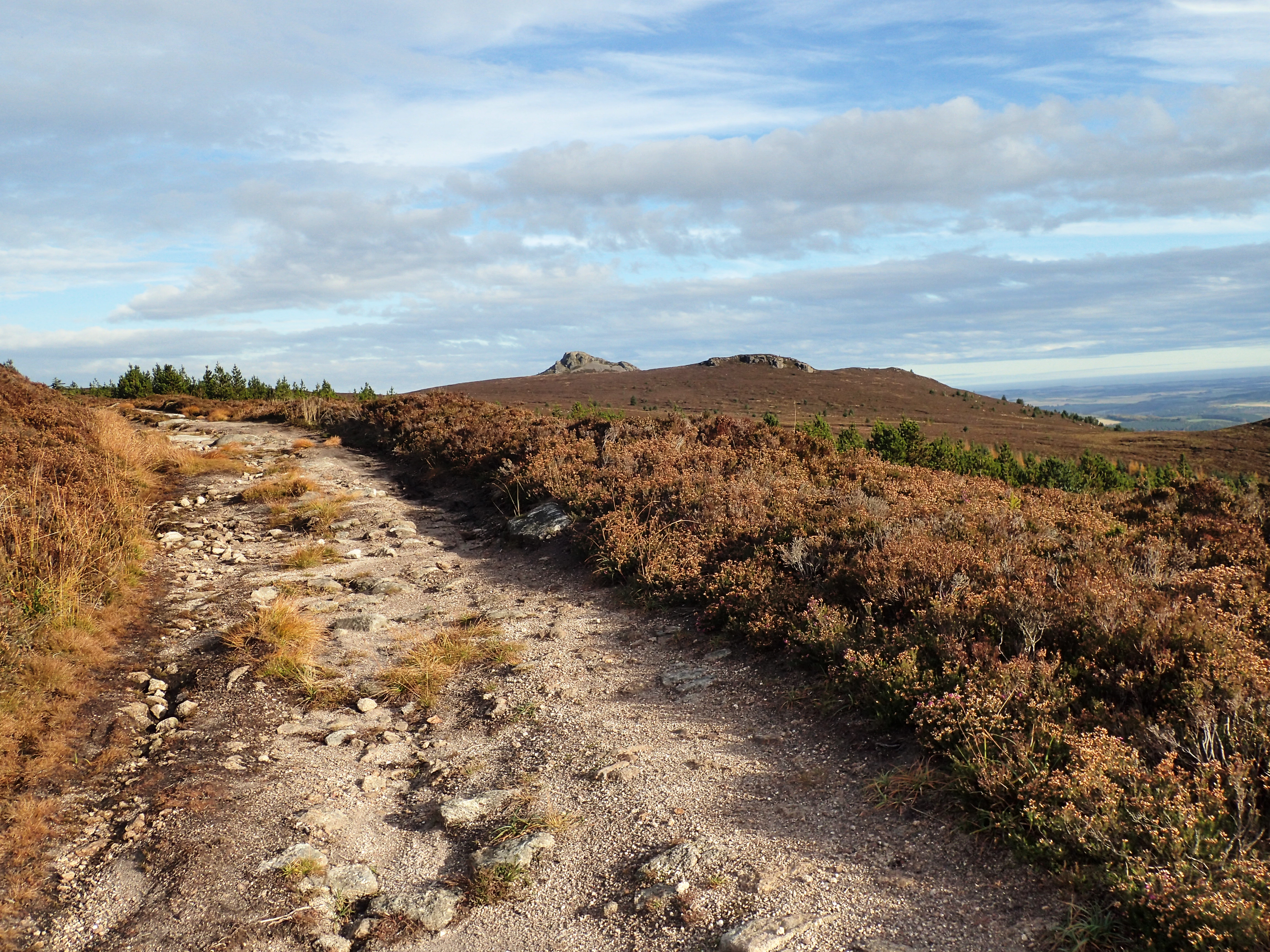
- The trail passing through heathland on the slopes of Oxen Craig
- Length: 11 1/2 miles (18.5 km)
- Location: Aberdeenshire, Scotland
- Trailheads: Bennachie Centre; 57.2847°N 2.4989°W; Suie car park 57.2970°N 2.7535°W
- Use: Hiking
- Elevation change: 2,320 ft (710 m)
- Highest point: Watch Craig, 1,475 ft (450 m)
- Lowest point: Bennachie Centre, 450 ft (140 m)

The Gordon Way is a waymarked hiking trail in Aberdeenshire, Scotland. It runs for 11 1/2 miles (18.5 km) through the Bennachie Forest. The route was one of a series maintained by the Forestry Commission and Aberdeenshire Council. In 2016, the council withdrew completely from its maintaining the route (a cost of £9,486 per year) due to budgetary constraints.

== Route ==
The trail runs from the Essons car park at the Bennachie Centre, near Inverurie, through the Bennachie Forest, crossing the Bridge of Alford to Clatt road at the bealach between Bennachie and Suie Hill, to the Suie car park, which is located on the bealach between Suie Hill and Hill of Millmedden, 3 miles (4.8 km) south-east of Rhynie. There are plans to extend the route to Rhynie in future, with a proposed extension from Inverurie to Huntly through Rhynie. The route follows former peat extraction routes.

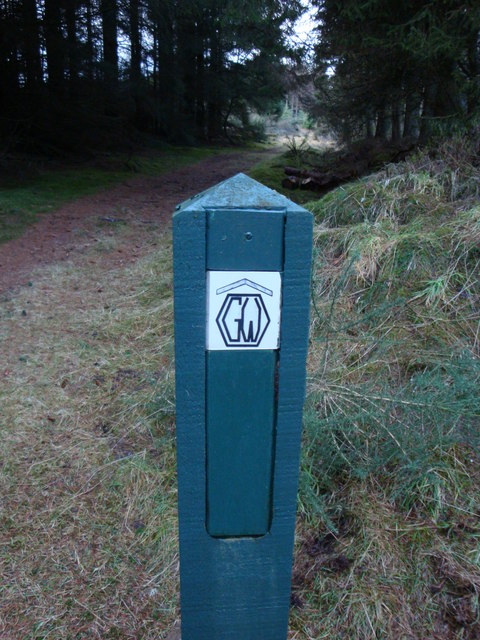
Waymark used on the Gordon Way

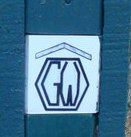
Detail of the waymark used on the Gordon Way

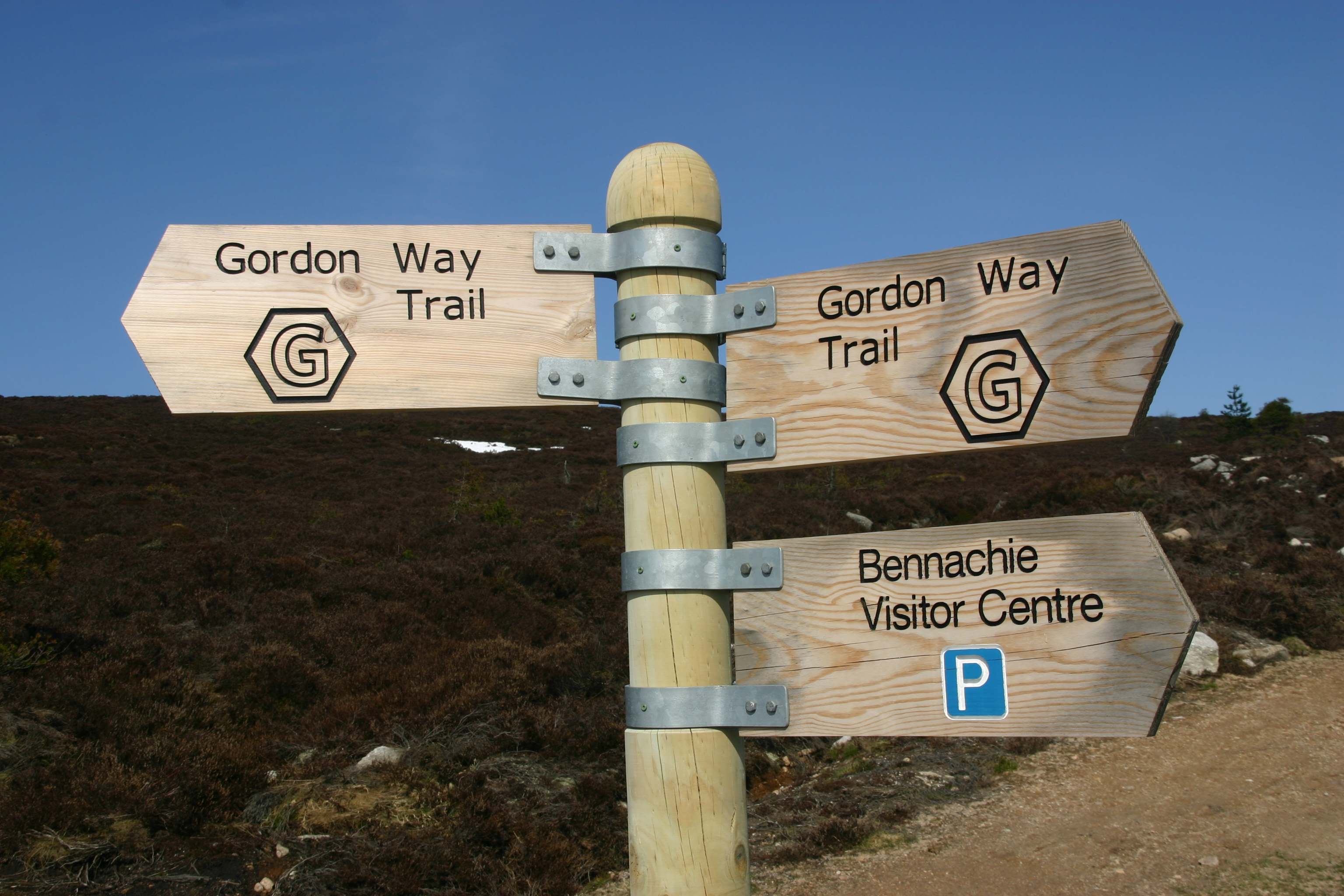
One of the route markers erected in 2010 to mark the Gordon Way
