= Dun Cruinn =

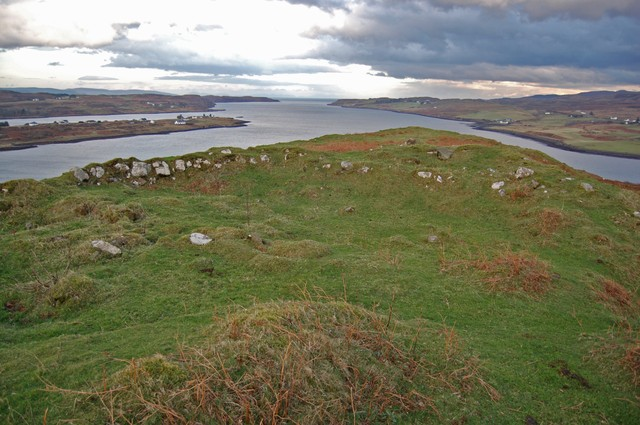
- Looking north-northwest at the site, between Loch Snizort Beag (on the left) and Loch Eyre

- Location within Highland
- 57°28′58″N 6°19′17″W
- Type: Dun
- Periods: Iron Age
- Location: Isle of Skye, Scotland
- OS grid reference: NG 411 518

Scheduled monument
- Reference no.: SM910

Dun Cruinn is a prehistoric site about 10 kilometres (6.2 mi) north-west of Portree, on the Isle of Skye, Scotland. It is on the Skerinish Peninsula, between Loch Snizort Beag and Loch Eyre.

== Description ==
There is a fort on a rocky knoll: it is an irregular oval, about 95 metres (312 ft) north-northwest to south-southeast, by 25 metres (82 ft), enclosing an area of about 0.19 hectares (0.47 acres). The wall of the fort is now seen as a band of rubble, about 3 metres (9.8 ft) thick, best preserved in the north. It is divided about midway by a rampart and ditch.

In the south of the fort are the remains of a dun (or broch), built later than the fort, diameter about 20 metres (66 ft) and having a maximum height of 1.5 metres (4.9 ft).
