= Christian Maclagan =

British antiquary and archaeologist

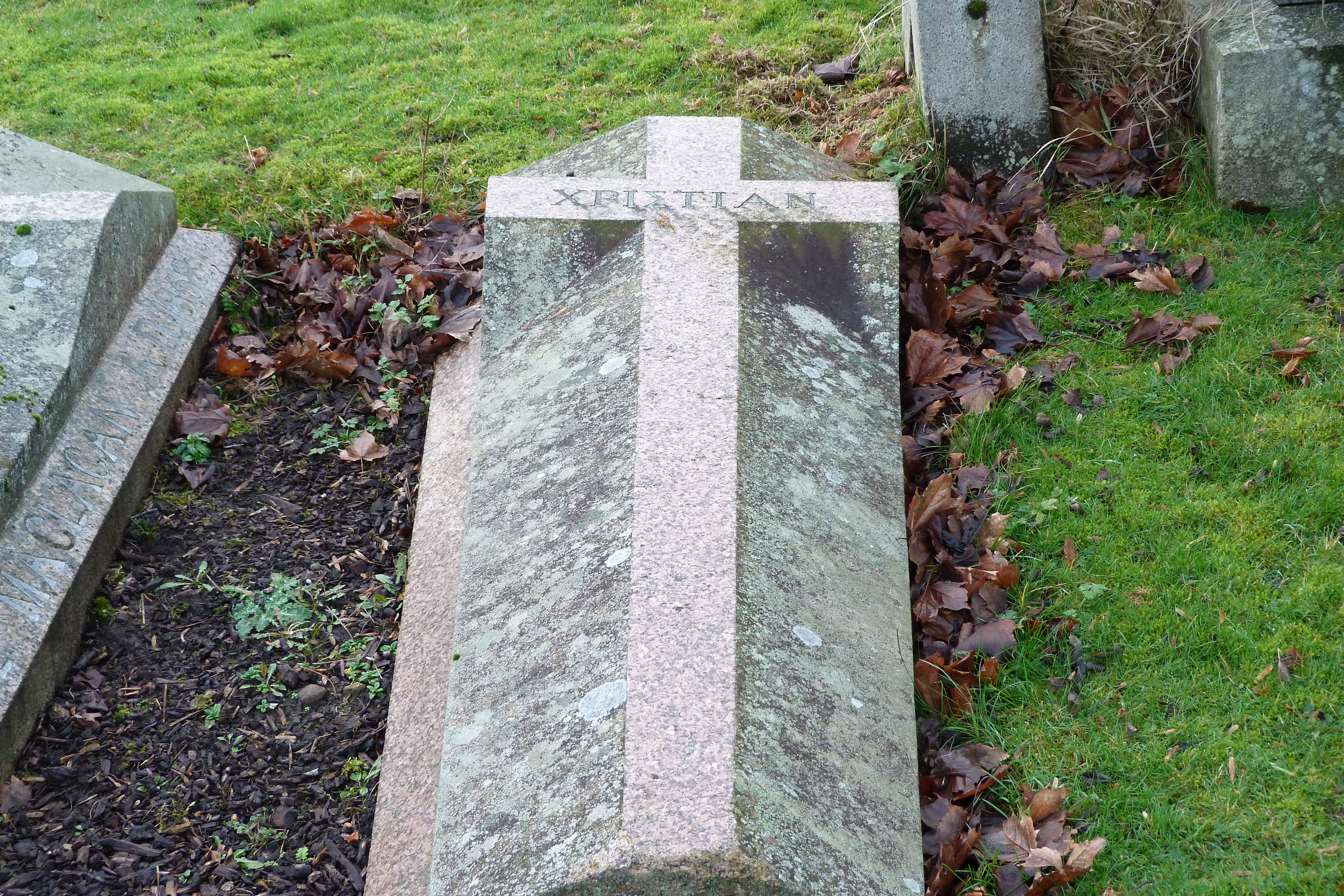
- Christian Maclagan's Grave in Stirling's Old Town Cemetery
- Born: 1811; Braehead, Denny, Scotland
- Died: 10 May 1901 (aged 89–90); Ravenscroft, Stirling, Scotland
- Occupations: Archaeology, Antiquities

Christian Maclagan (1811–10 May 1901) was a Scottish antiquarian and early archaeologist, described by one author as "the earliest female archaeologist in the British Isles," and certainly among the earliest examples. She is known for her collection of rubbings of Celtic crosses and Pictish stones from across Scotland, and was a pioneer of stratigraphic excavation. Although she lost the use of her right hand due to a medical condition she nevertheless produced numerous drawings, sketches and paintings with her left hand. She took action to help those affected by poverty in Stirling. She refused to sit for portraits although one obituary described her as tall. She was a suffragist. She wrote an autobiography but the script remains lost. She was nominated to be one of Scotland's Heroines honoured at the National Wallace Monument's Hall of Heroes.

== Life ==
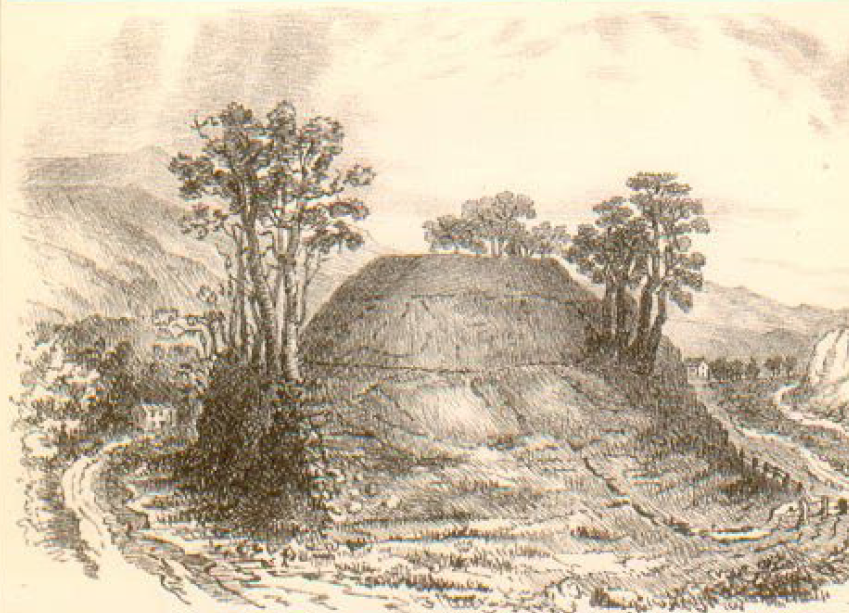
Christian Maclagan, drawing of Keir Hill, Gargunnock, c.1870

Daughter of distiller and chemist George Maclagan and Janet Colville of Stirling, she was born on the family's farm at Braehead near Denny. Her father died in 1818, as did her paternal grandfather, Frederick Maclagan, parish minister at Melrose, and her mother moved the family to Stirling around 1820. Between 1829 and 1834 the Maclagan family lived in Edinburgh, to access medical treatment for Christian's sister, where Maclagan may have had additional access to libraries and educational resources. By April 1834 they had moved back to Stirling, where Maclagan would remain for the rest of her life. She lived in a house in Pitt Terrace, a wealthy part of the town near St Ninian's Well and the modern Stirling Council offices.

Her mother died in 1858, and until that time Christian Maclagan engaged in philanthropic activities, establishing a Sunday School and subscribing towards the cost of a library. Following her mother's death, Maclagan built the house 'Ravenscroft' in the Abercromby district of Stirling, where she went to live with her companion Jessie Hunter Colvin, a fellow antiquarian. The two lived together until Hunter Colvin's death in 1890. After the Disruption of 1843 Maclagan joined the Free Church of Scotland and in 1865 she funded the building of a new kirk. The church was commissioned in memory of her brother, and made Maclagan the first recorded female client of the architect Frederick Thomas Pilkington. Her relationship with the Free Church soured in the 1870s and she sued to reclaim the church which she then gifted to the established Church of Scotland. She apparently received a bequest from one of her brothers, who had died in Calcutta, at around the time of her mother's death, and this along with her inheritance from her mother established her as a woman of some wealth. In 1866, she gave £10 to the National Wallace Memorial appeal, and also contributed to Christmas celebrations associated with the mission school. Her obituary in the Stirling Observer credited her with charitable donations and activity throughout her life, especially in connection with problems of housing in Stirling.

She was well-educated, knowing Latin, French, Greek, and Gaelic well — her paternal grandfather had tried his hand at a translation of the Bible into Gaelic, and collected Gaelic poetry. She also spoke some Italian and was an artist of some skill. She seems to have made use of the private libraries of gentlemen she knew, both relatives such as her father and grandfather and those further afield such as the Reverend Edward L Barnwell in Wiltshire, to extend her reading, as access to institutional libraries such as that of the Society of Antiquaries of Scotland was not permitted to her.

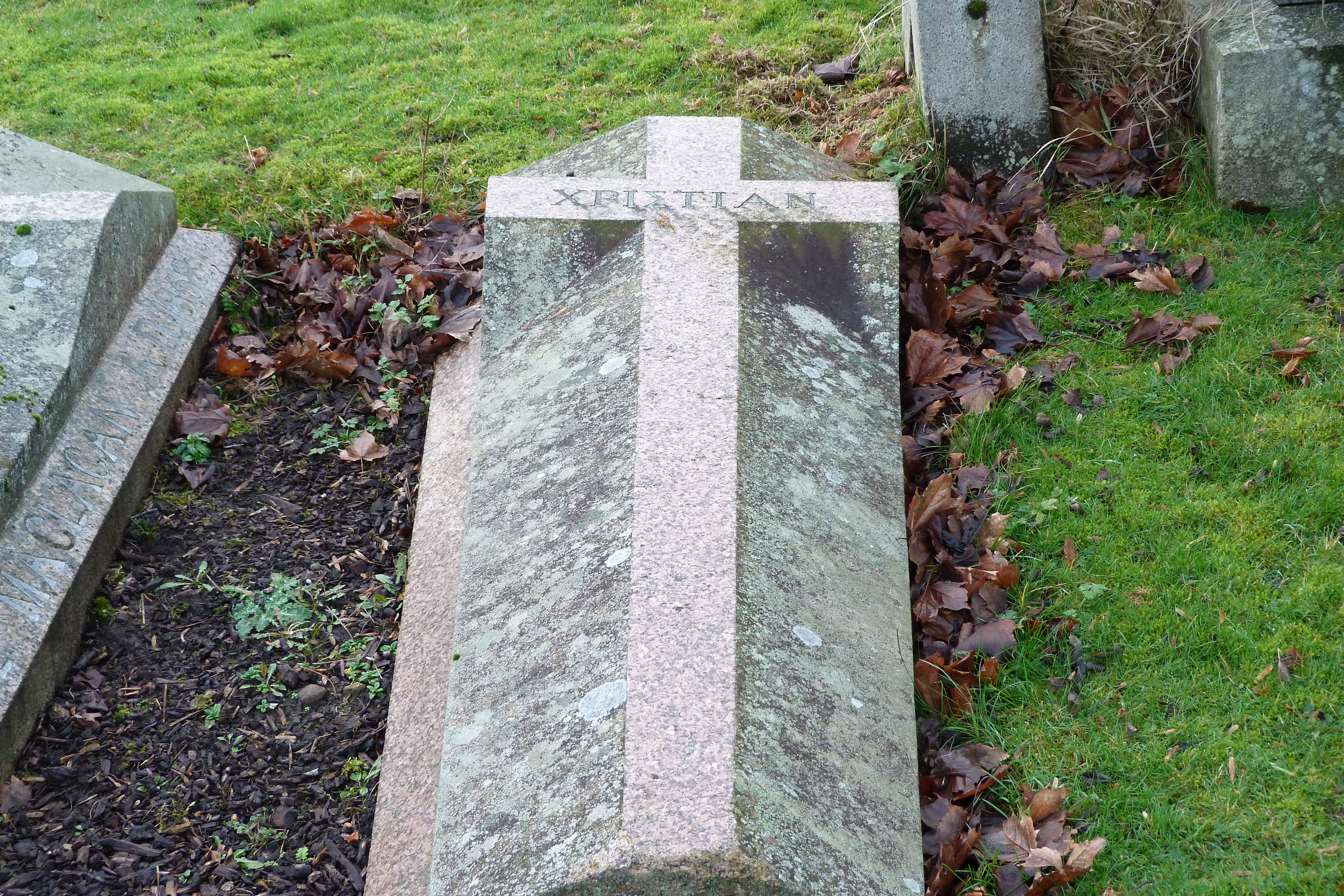
Christian Maclagan's Grave in Stirling's Old Town Cemetery

Maclagan died at home in 1901. Her estate was valued at 3100 pounds sterling at her death.

== Antiquarian activities ==
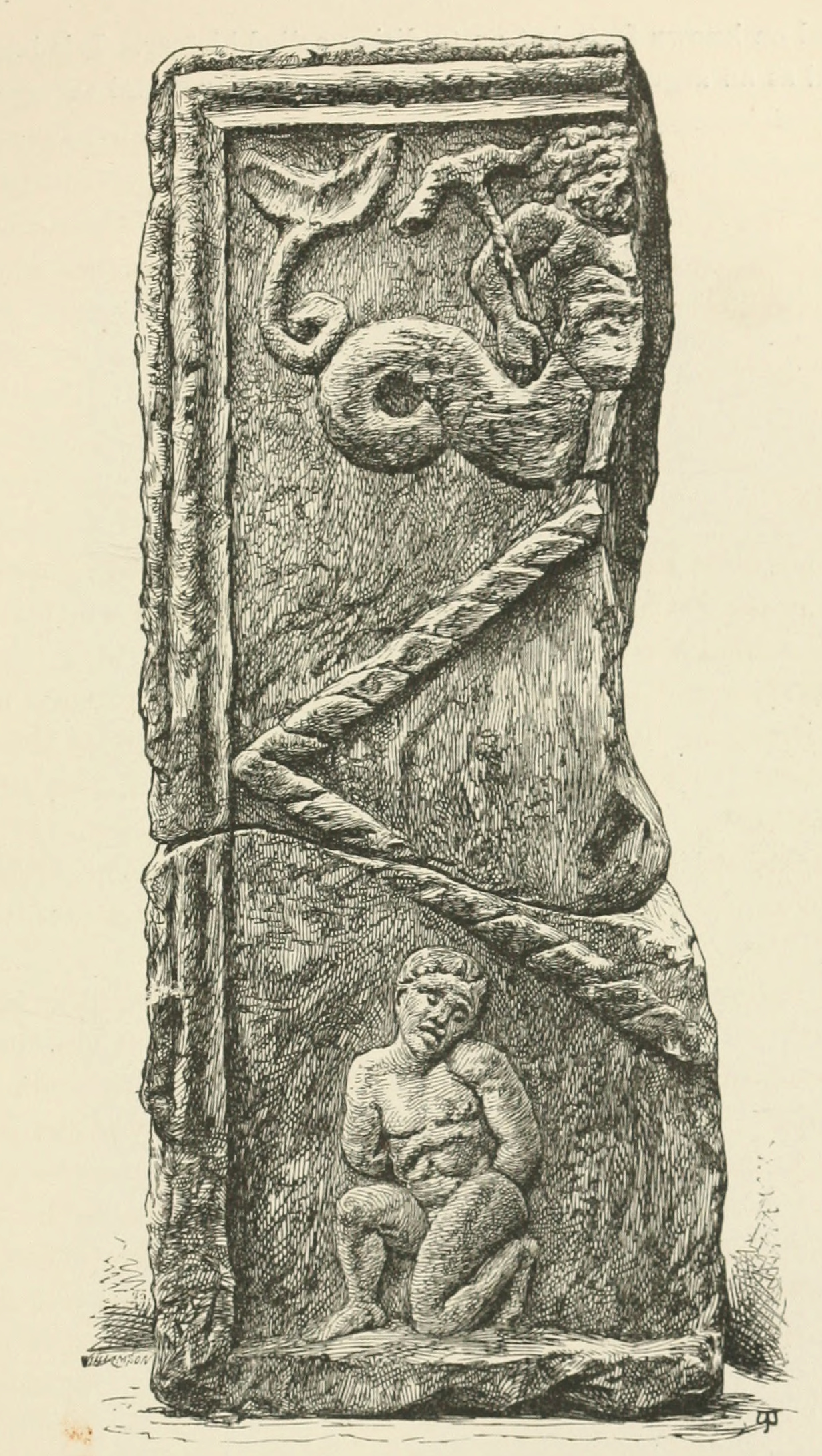
Uncredited artist's sketch of distance slab found at Arniebog Farm, Westerwood, Cumbernauld. Christian Maclagan attempted to buy the slab and produced a sketch of it in ink. It has been scanned and a video produced.

Maclagan theorised that megalithic circles and tombs were the remnants of houses and forts. She believed an academic examination of all such sites would reveal a message, through the archaeological 'language' needed for such examination. Accordingly, she carried out her own archaeological investigations through extensive independent travel to sites across Scotland. The findings of her investigations included rubbings from hundreds of archaeological specimens of various sites and were published at her own expense. Although her fieldwork is likely to have taken place across multiple years preceding, her first archaeological publication was not until 1871, when she was already 60, on antiquities near Stirling. She carried out an excavation on the Mither Tap of Bennachie. Her major work on Scottish hillforts was published in 1875. In 1880 she excavated two carved stones in Abderdeenshire, and published their details along with drawings. After several further years publishing on Scottish archaeology and antiquaries, she published in 1881 her second book, Chips From Old Stone on various stone structures she had examined in Sardinia, Brittany, Rome, and France.

Some of Maclagan's theories were considered eccentric to her contemporaries. The dismissal of her views could be due to sexist attitudes of her era, or due to the anthropological comments Maclagan would make alongside her archaeological studies, which were particularly influenced by her tendency to present the Scots as conducting a noble resistance to the Romans, even when she was discussing archaeological remains of buildings from times significantly before the Roman invasion. At least one author criticized her work despite, presumably because of her Christian name, mistaking her for a man.

One of her primary interests were in the brochs of Scotland and she also was one of the pioneers of stratigraphic excavation. She devised a special method for taking rubbings from sculptured stones; the exact details of how this was done were kept secret. Possibly her greatest contribution to posterity was her meticulous collection of rubbings of Celtic Christian crosses and Pictish symbol stones, made from c 1850 onwards, and donated to the British Museum in 1895. These rubbings include some of the earliest done at Wemyss Cave.

As a woman Maclagan was disbarred from obtaining a fellowship of the Society of Antiquaries of Scotland, and instead she was merely a Lady Associate as were Lady John Scott and Queen Victoria. She told friends she was an antiquarian before Queen Victoria was born. Later she threatened to resign the title since the society read her papers in her absence without her having the opportunity to respond. She could not formally publish with the Society and required a man to publish her work under his name. As a result of this, it has been supposed, she sent her rubbings to the British Museum. She remained a Lady Associate however until the time of her death around the age of 92. The Smith Museum in Stirling contains one of her models of a broch tower and a wooden carving as a tribute to her. She was buried in Stirling's old town cemetery.

This sexism may also have led to her work being overlooked and one of her key discoveries, the Livilands Broch, being lost. A crowdfunding project was launched in 2016 by Stirling Council's Archaeologist Dr Murray Cook to rediscover the broch that she discovered. In 2018 Cook also identified using Maclagan's records, a destroyed hillfort on Abbey Craig under the Wallace Monument, which radiocarbon dating demonstrated may have been one of the last hillforts built in Scotland. The hillfort dates to the second half of the 1st millennium AD.

== Selected publications ==
- The Hill Forts Stone Circles and Others Structural Remains of Ancient Scotland, Edmonston and Douglas, 1875.
- Chips from old stones 1881
- What Mean These Stones? D. Douglas, 1894 (described as a "slight and idiosyncratic work" by Euan MacKie).
- A catalogue raisonné of the British Museum collection of rubbings from ancient sculptured stones. 1898
- On the Round Castles and Ancient Dwellings of the Valley of the Forth, and its Tributary the Teith.
- Notes of a Roman Sculptured Stone recently discovered at Cumbernauld, and of an Inscribed Stone at Stirling, &c. (With Photograph and Copy of the Inscription) (pp 178–9)

== Commemoration ==
A Historic Environment Scotland commemorative plaque was unveiled at 19 Clarendon Place, Stirling in August 2019. In 2016, a carving by Iain Chalmers was set up by the Stirling Smith Art Gallery and Museum to commemorate Maclagan and her work.

== Bibliography ==
- The Biographical Dictionary of Scottish Women edited by Elizabeth L. Ewan, Sue Innes, Sian Reynolds, Rose Pipes (2008).
- Millar, A. H. (1912). "Maclagan, Christian" . In Lee, Sidney (ed.). Dictionary of National Biography (2nd supplement). London: Smith, Elder & Co. pp. 531–532. This article incorporates text from this source, which is in the public domain.
- Elsdon, Sheila M. (2004), Christian Maclagan: Stirling's formidable lady antiquary, Balgavies: Pinkfoot Press, ISBN 1-874012-43-1
- Scotsman, 13 May 1901;
- Sentinel (Stirling), 14 May 1901;
- Athenæum, 18 May 1901;
- Scots Magazine, 1818;
- Hew Scott's Fasti Eccles. Scot.;
- notes from Miss Maclagan's MS. autobiography, supplied by J. W. Barty, LL.D.;
- notes from W. B. Cook, Stirling;
