= Craig Phadrig =

Forested hill on the western edge of Inverness, Scotland

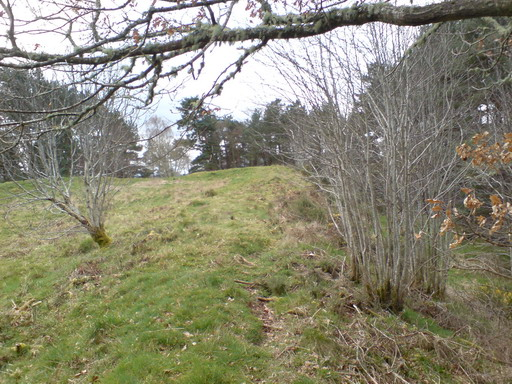
- The site of the fort on Craig Phadrig

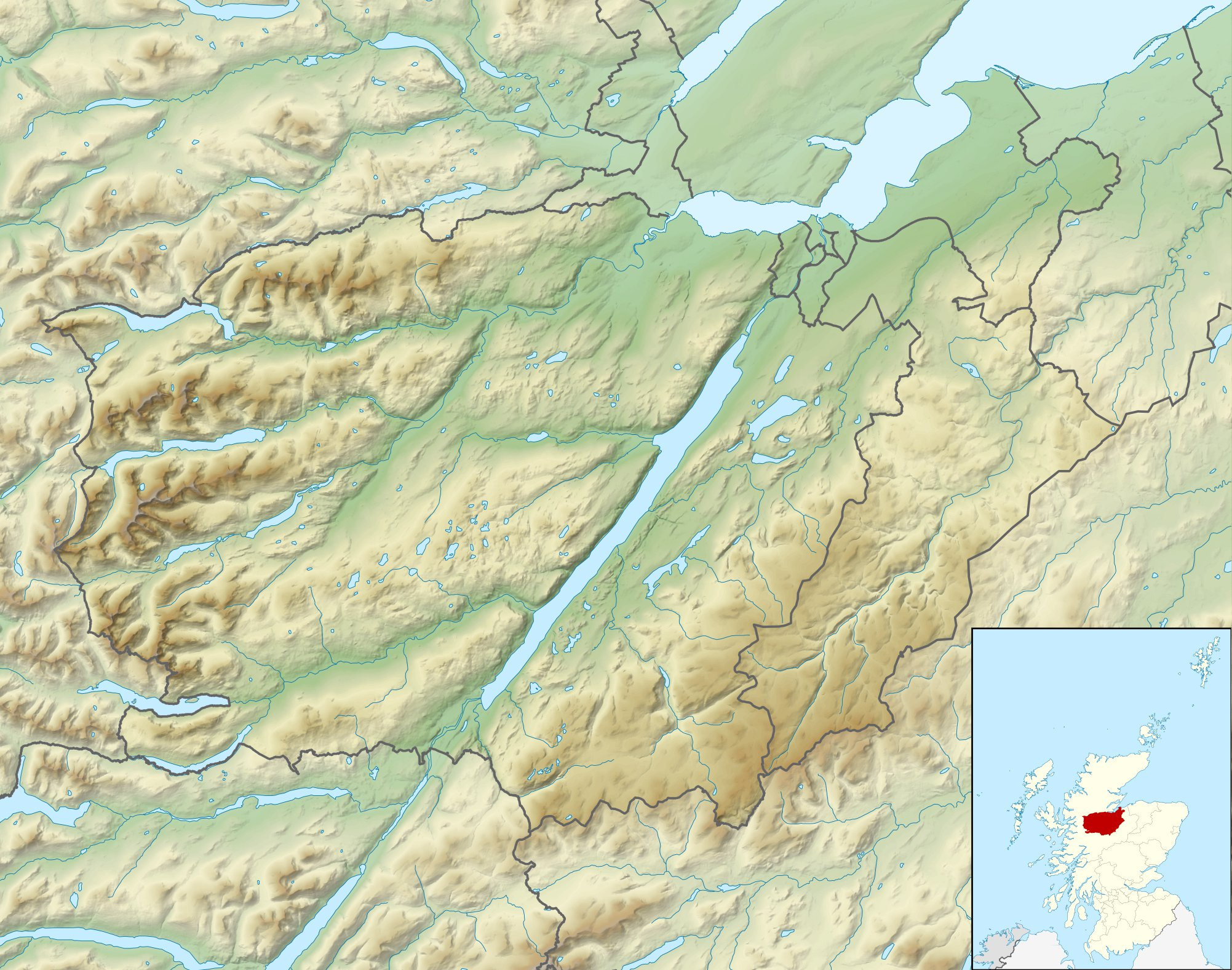
- Location within Inverness area
- 57.477°N 4.269°W
- Type: Hill fort
- Periods: Iron Age, Pictish

Site notes
- Material: Stone, earth
- Height: 172 metres (564 ft) AOD
- Length: 75 metres (246 ft)
- Width: 25 metres (82 ft)

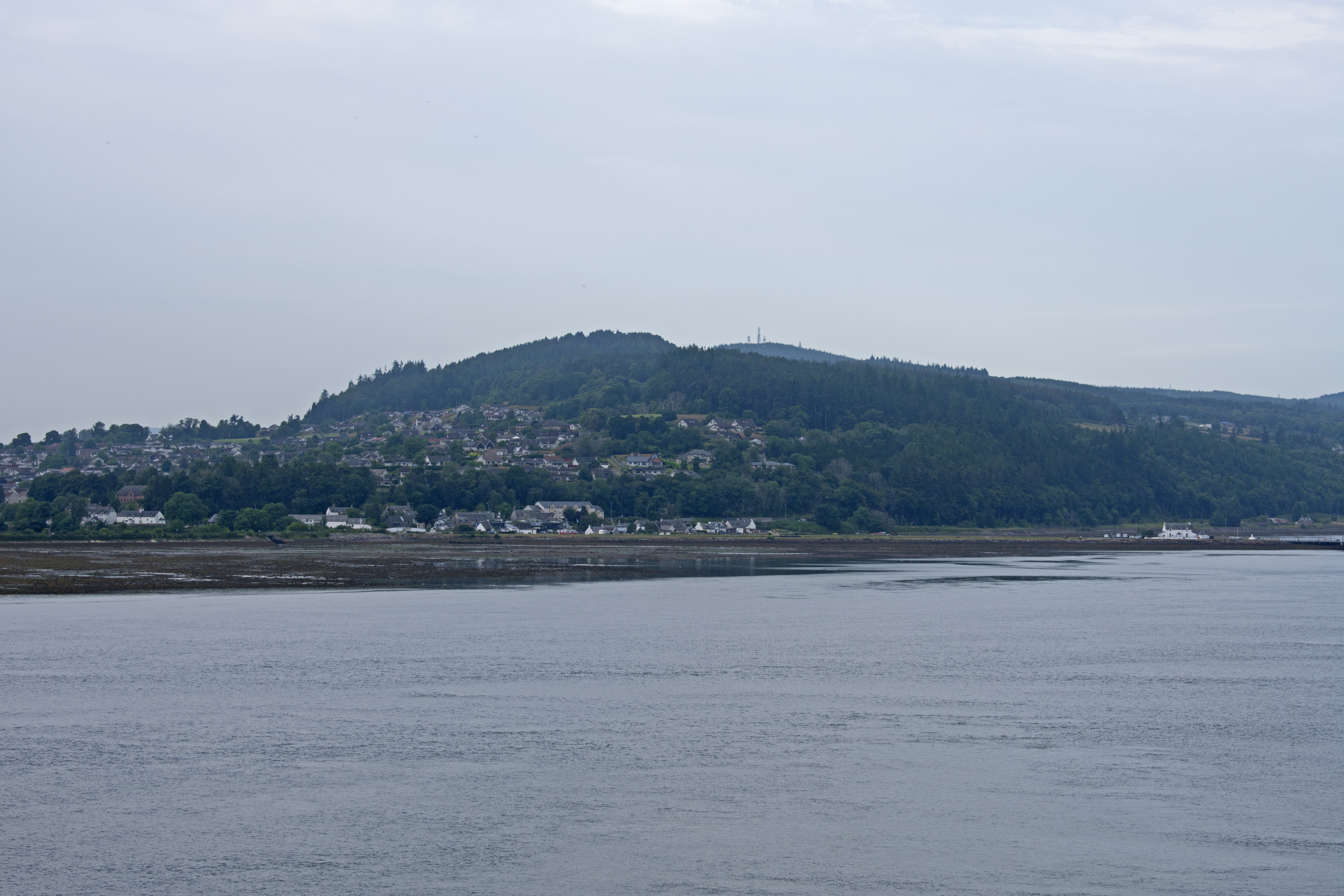
Craig Phadrig seen from North Kessock

Craig Phadrig (Scottish Gaelic: Creag Phàdraig, meaning Rock of Patrick) is a forested hill on the western edge of Inverness, Scotland. A hill fort on the summit is generally supposed to have been the base of the Pictish king Bridei mac Maelchon (ruled circa 554–584). The hill rises to 172 metres (564 ft) above sea level and overlooks the Beauly Firth to the north and the mouth of the River Ness to the north-east. The hill is currently owned and managed by Forestry and Land Scotland.

== Craig Phadrig fort ==
The summit of the hill is occupied by a vitrified fort; a stone structure affected by fire to produce a glass-like material. The inner wall of the fort defines an area around 75 by 23 metres (246 by 75 ft), and survives to a height of around 1.2 metres (3 ft 11 in). Beyond this is an outer wall and part of a third wall or hornwork to the east. Radiocarbon dates obtained in the 1970s suggest that the inner wall was constructed in the 4th century. Excavations at this time revealed evidence of Pictish occupation, including metal-working implements and French pottery, dating from the 7th century. The fort is a scheduled monument.

== Bridei and Columba ==
Craig Phadrig is commonly assumed to have been the site where St Columba visited the Pictish king Bridei around 565. The event is recorded in Adomnán's Life of Columba, in which he describes several encounters between the two. The identification of Craig Phadrig is not universally accepted, and other sites including Urquhart Castle and Inverness Castle have been suggested.
