= Tap o' Noth =

Hillfort in Aberdeenshire, Scotland, UK

Highest point
- Elevation: 563 m (1,847 ft)
- Prominence: 247 m (810 ft)
- Listing: Marilyn

Geography
- Location: Aberdeenshire, Scotland
- Parent range: Grampian Mountains
- OS grid: NJ48408293
- Topo map: OS Landranger 37

Tap o' Noth
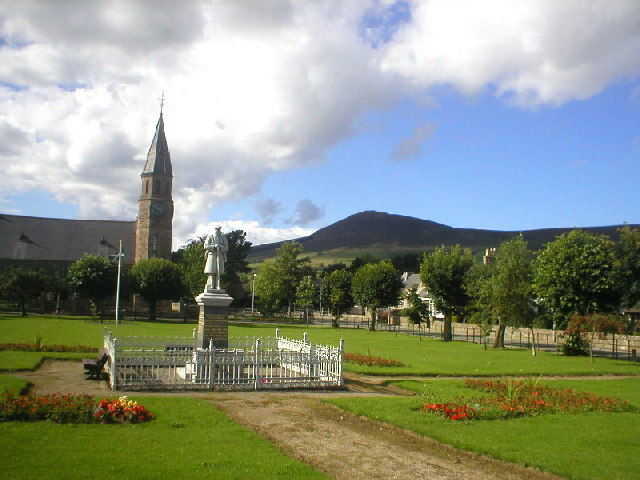
- Tap o' Noth seen from Rhynie
- Interactive map of Tap o' Noth
- 57.3514°N 2.8586°W
- Type: Hill fort

Scheduled monument
- Official name: Tap o'Noth fort
- Type: Prehistoric domestic and defensive: fort (includes hill fort and promontory fort)
- Designated: 18 August 1882
- Reference no.: SM63

The Tap o' Noth is a hill and the name of a hillfort on its summit, 8 miles south of Huntly in Aberdeenshire, Scotland at grid reference NJ485293. It is the second highest fort in Scotland and its main feature is its well-preserved vitrified wall which encloses an area of approximately 100 m by 30 m, 0.3 hectares. Archaeological finds from the site include a stone axe head dated to between c. 2000 BC– c.800 BC, and a decorated bronze rein-ring dated to the 1st–3rd century AD. The site has been designated a scheduled monument.

The vitrified fort is the centre of a settlement within another rampart which encloses a much larger area of some 7 hectares. This outer rampart was constructed in the fifth to sixth centuries AD; large scale settlement within the area may date back as far as the third century AD, contemporary with the Pictish culture.

The antiquarian James Macdonald led an archaeological excavation of the vitrified fort on the summit of Tap o' Noth in the 1880s. An archaeological investigation of the summit fort, the rampart of the larger later fort and some of the Pictish period house platforms within it was undertaken by the University of Aberdeen's Northern Picts: Rhynie Environs Project between 2017 and 2022.

Drone photographs and lidar surveys suggest that there may have been as many as 800 huts, many in groups with a larger hut at the centre of the group. It has been described as the largest known settlement in early-Medieval (post-Roman) Britain.

In the nearby valley, the Pictish image of Rhynie Man on a standing stone has been found on Barflat farm. A post-Roman settlement has been discovered in the valley, with evidence for the consumption of wine from the Mediterranean, the use of glass vessels from western France, and intensive metalwork production. This is interpreted as signs of high social status, possibly with royal connections.

it has been suggested that the decline of the settlement on Tap o' Noth and the high status centre at Rhynie may have been associated with a subsistence crisis precipitated by the Late Antique Little Ice Age (LALA) and the Justinian plague epidemics of the mid sixth century.
