= Vitrified fort =

Stone enclosure with vitrified walls

Vitrified forts are stone enclosures whose walls have been subjected to vitrification through heat. It was long thought that these structures were unique to Scotland, but they have since been identified in several other parts of western and northern Europe.

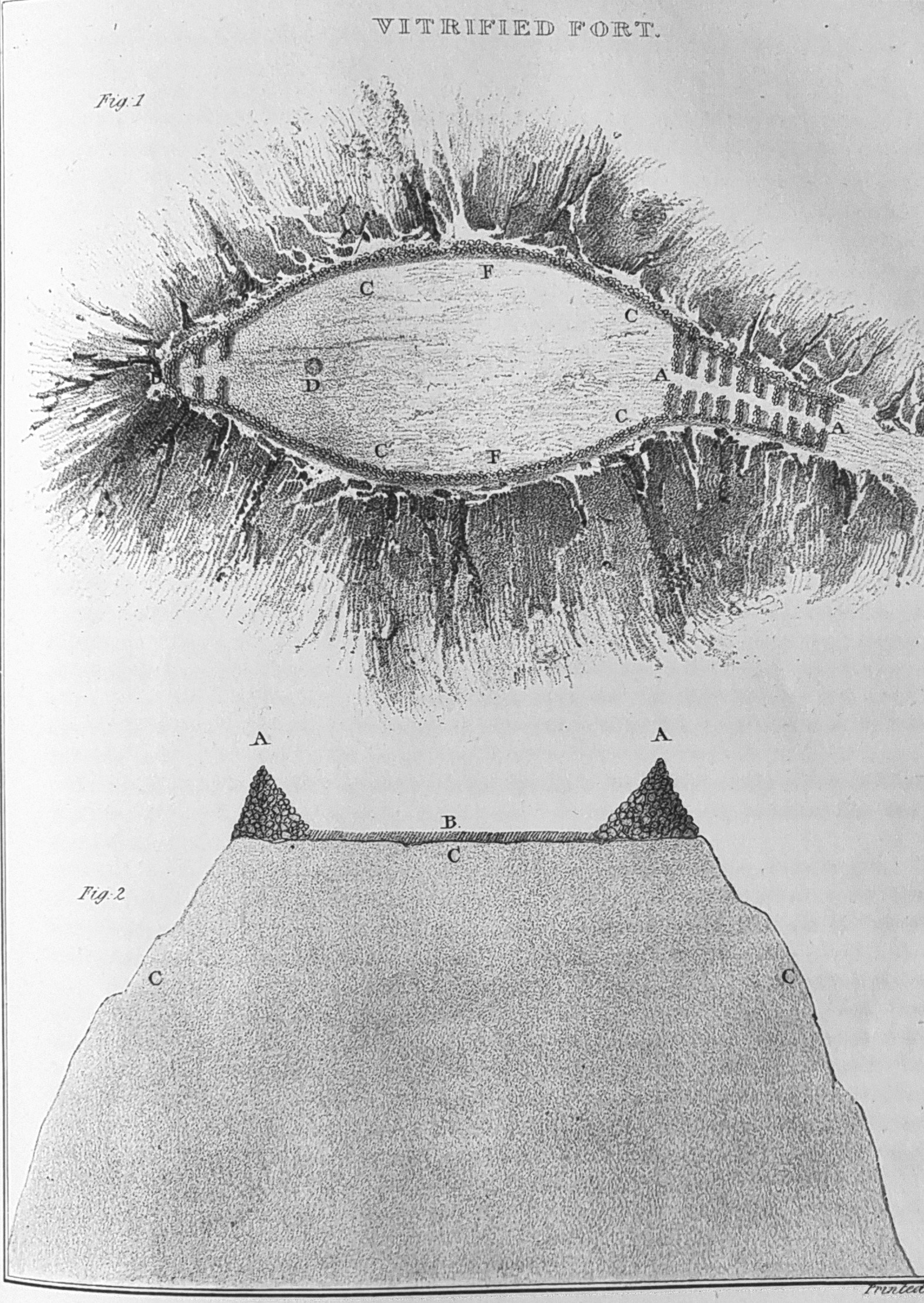
Vitrified fort, England, 1829

Vitrified forts are generally situated on hills offering strong defensive positions. Their form seems to have been determined by the contour of the flat summits which they enclose. The walls vary in size, a few being upwards of 12 feet (3.7 m) high, and are so broad that they present the appearance of embankments. Weak parts of the defence are strengthened by double or triple walls, and occasionally vast lines of ramparts, composed of large blocks of unhewn and unvitrified stones, envelop the vitrified centre at some distance from it. The walls themselves are termed vitrified ramparts.

== Vitrification process ==
No lime or cement has been found in any of these structures, all of them presenting the peculiarity of being more or less consolidated by the fusion of the rocks of which they are built. This fusion, which has been caused by the application of intense heat, is not equally complete in the various forts, or even in the walls of the same fort. In some cases the stones are only partially melted and calcined; in others their adjoining edges are fused so that they are firmly cemented together; in many instances pieces of rock are enveloped in a glassy enamel-like coating which binds them into a uniform whole; and at times, though rarely, the entire length of the wall presents one solid mass of vitreous substance.

It is not clear why or how the walls were subjected to vitrification. Some antiquarians have argued that it was done to strengthen the wall, but the heating actually weakens the structure. Battle damage is also unlikely to be the cause, as the walls are thought to have been subjected to carefully maintained fires to ensure they were hot enough for vitrification to take place.

The expert consensus explains vitrified forts as the product of deliberate destruction either following the capture of the site by an enemy force or by the occupants at the end of its active life as an act of ritual closure. The process has no chronological significance and is found during both Iron Age and early medieval forts in Scotland.

== List of forts ==
Since John Williams, one of the earliest of British geologists, and author of The Natural History of the Mineral Kingdom, first described these singular ruins in 1777, over 70 examples have been discovered in Scotland. The most remarkable are:

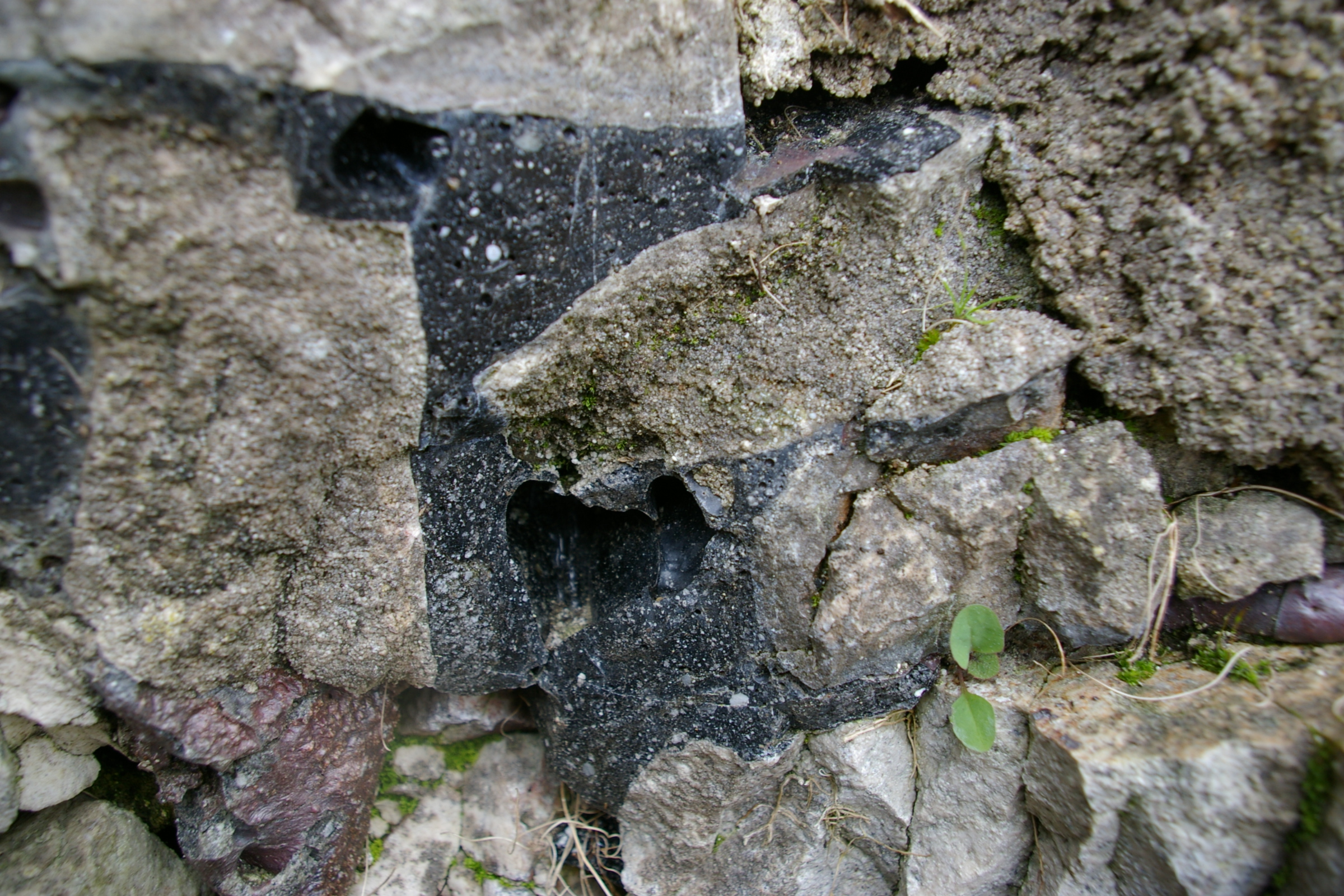
Part of the vitrified wall at Sainte-Suzanne (Mayenne)

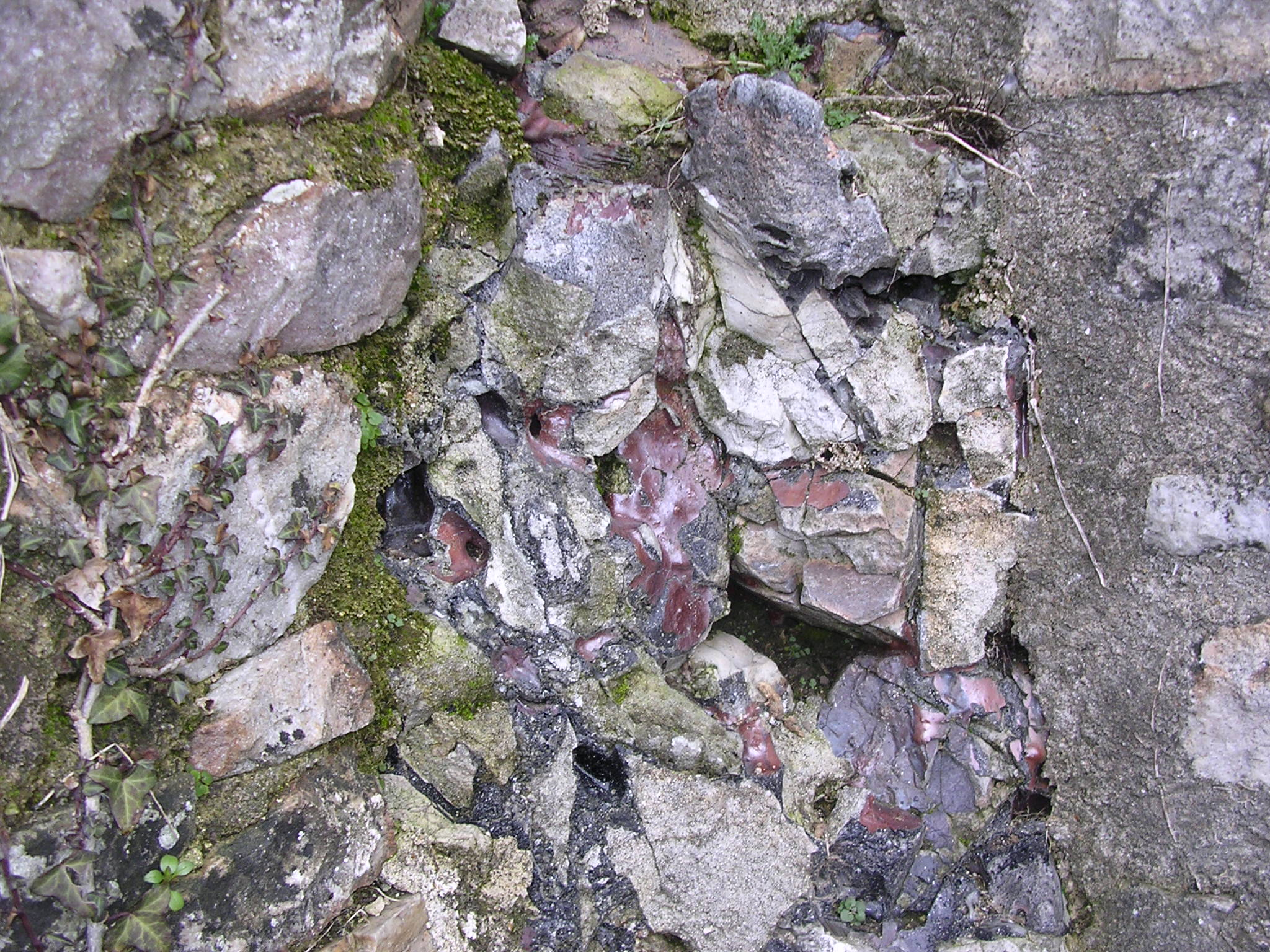
Fragment of vitrified wall at Sainte-Suzanne (Mayenne)

- Dun Mac Sniachan (or Dun Mac Uisneachan), Argyll, the largest in area at 245 m by 50 m
- Benderloch, north of Oban; grid reference NM 902 381
- Craig Phadrig, near Inverness; NH 640 452
- Ord Hill, North Kessock, near Inverness; NH 664 491
- Dun Deardail (or Dundbhairdghall) in Glen Nevis; NN 127 701
- Knock Farril (or Knockfarrel), near Strathpeffer, NH 505 585
- Dun Creich, in Sutherland; NH 651 882
- Finavon (or Finhaven), near Aberlemno; NO 507 556
- Barryhill, in Perthshire
- Laws, near Dundee; NO 490 349
- Dunagoil and Burnt Islands, in Buteshire
- Mote of Mark, (Rockcliffe) near Rockcliffe; NX 845 540
- Trusty's Hill, Anwoth, near Gatehouse of Fleet; NX 589 560
- Tap o' Noth, Aberdeenshire; NJ 484 293
- Dunnideer Castle, Aberdeenshire
- Cowdenknowes, in Berwickshire; NT 585 370

For a long time it was supposed that these forts were peculiar to Scotland; but they are found also in the Isle of Man (Cronk Sumark); County Londonderry and County Cavan, Ireland; in Upper Lusatia, Bohemia, Silesia, Saxony, and Thuringia; in the provinces on the Rhine, especially in the neighbourhood of the Nahe; in the Ucker Lake; in Brandenburg, where the walls are formed of burnt and smelted bricks; in Hungary; in several places in France, such as Châteauvieux (near Pionnat), Péran, La Courbe, Sainte-Suzanne, Puy de Gaudy, and Thauron; also rarely in the north of England. Castle Hill, Almondbury in Huddersfield, West Yorkshire. Broborg is a vitrified hill-fort in Uppland, Sweden.

== Appearance in media ==
=== Arthur C. Clarke's Mysterious World ===
The 16 September 1980 episode of Arthur C. Clarke's Mysterious World features a segment in which the archaeologist Ian Ralston examines the mystery of the vitrified fort Tap o' Noth and tries to recreate how it might be accomplished by piling stones and setting a massive bonfire, repeating the work of V. Gordon Childe and Wallace Thorneycroft in the 1930s. The experiment produced a few partially vitrified stones, but it was asserted that no answers were gleaned as to how large-scale forts could have been crafted with the approach tried in the programme.
