= List of sites on the Inventory of Gardens and Designed Landscapes =

This list includes the gardens and designed landscapes sites on the Inventory of Gardens and Designed Landscapes managed by Historic Environment Scotland.

The list is grouped by Scottish council areas.

== Aberdeen City ==
Name	Type	Date listed	Coordinates	Designation	Image
Duthie Park	Public park	31 March 2006	57.13049°N 2.10347°W	GDL00166	
Piper Alpha Memorial Garden / North Sea Memorial Rose Garden	Memorial	3 October 2023	57.13812°N 2.17958°W	GDL00412	

== Aberdeenshire ==
Name	Type	Date listed	Coordinates	Designation	Image
Straloch	Estate	31 March 2006	57.28061°N 2.22915°W	GDL00351	
Castle Forbes	Estate	31 March 2006	57.26220°N 2.62923°W	GDL00090	
Park House	Estate	31 March 2006	57.06782°N 2.36590°W	GDL00309	
Fyvie Castle	Estate	1 July 1987	57.44324°N 2.39264°W	GDL00184	
Haddo House	Estate	1 July 1987	57.40123°N 2.22591°W	GDL00206	
Williamston House	Estate	1 July 1987	57.37561°N 2.58639°W	GDL00386	
Leith Hall	Estate	1 July 1987	57.35600°N 2.76252°W	GDL00258	
Newton House	Estate	1 July 1987	57.35592°N 2.56201°W	GDL00300	
Pitmedden Garden	Garden	1 July 1987	57.34142°N 2.19398°W	GDL00314	
Keith Hall	Estate	1 July 1987	57.28177°N 2.34980°W	GDL00232	
House of Monymusk	Estate	1 July 1987	57.22391°N 2.51504°W	GDL00289	
Kildrummy Castle	Estate	1 July 1987	57.23563°N 2.90473°W	GDL00237	
Castle Fraser	Estate	1 July 1987	57.20508°N 2.45946°W	GDL00091	
Candacraig House	Estate	1 July 1987	57.18681°N 3.09137°W	GDL00083	
Craigievar Castle	Estate	1 July 1987	57.17470°N 2.71791°W	GDL00114	
Dunecht House	Estate	1 July 1987	57.15961°N 2.38956°W	GDL00153	
Tillypronie	Estate	1 July 1987	57.16035°N 2.94455°W	GDL00373	
Drum Castle	Estate	1 July 1987	57.09743°N 2.34096°W	GDL00141	
Crathes Castle	Estate	1 July 1987	57.06317°N 2.43669°W	GDL00119	
Glen Tanar	Estate	1 July 1987	57.04996°N 2.86673°W	GDL00191	
Balmoral Castle	Estate	1 July 1987	57.03372°N 3.23001°W	GDL00045	
Invercauld Castle	Estate	1 July 1987	57.01804°N 3.36212°W	GDL00224	
Glenbervie House	Estate	1 July 1987	56.91472°N 2.37572°W	GDL00194	
Arbuthnott House	Estate	1 July 1987	56.86573°N 2.34434°W	GDL00016	
The Burn	Estate	1 July 1987	56.83605°N 2.66189°W	GDL00355	
Cluny Castle	Estate	31 March 2006	57.20264°N 2.51577°W	GDL00103	
Fasque House	Estate	31 March 2006	56.86881°N 2.58097°W	GDL00178	
Hatton Castle	Estate	30 June 2011	57.51032°N 2.40851°W	GDL00399	
Forglen House	Estate	30 June 2011	57.55318°N 2.50888°W	GDL00398	
Cairness House	Estate	30 June 2011	57.63895°N 1.94108°W	GDL00396	
Crimonmogate	Estate	30 June 2011	57.61639°N 1.93874°W	GDL00397	
Duff House	Estate	1 July 1987	57.65030°N 2.53465°W	GDL00148	

== Angus ==
Name	Type	Date listed	Coordinates	Designation	Image
Craig House	Estate	31 March 2006	56.69654°N 2.48771°W	GDL00110	
Dunninald Castle	Estate	31 March 2006	56.67893°N 2.48771°W	GDL00159	
Kinnaird Castle	Estate	1 July 1987	56.70583°N 2.60988°W	GDL00245	
The Guynd	Estate	1 July 1987	56.56641°N 2.70482°W	GDL00361	
Guthrie Castle	Estate	1 July 1987	56.64412°N 2.71517°W	GDL00205	
Airlie Castle	Estate	1 July 1987	56.65605°N 3.15504°W	GDL00009	
Cortachy Castle	Estate	1 July 1987	56.72200°N 2.98526°W	GDL00108	
Edzell Castle	Estate	1 July 1987	56.81180°N 2.68125°W	GDL00169	
House of Pitmuies	Estate	1 July 1987	56.63824°N 2.70872°W	GDL00215	
Glamis Castle	Estate	1 July 1987	56.62174°N 3.00059°W	GDL00189	
House of Dun	Estate	1 July 1987	56.72934°N 2.54244°W	GDL00213	
Brechin Castle	Estate	1 July 1987	56.72399°N 2.66748°W	GDL00070	

== Argyll and Bute ==
Name	Type	Date listed	Coordinates	Designation	Image
Rossdhu Castle	Estate	31 March 2006	56.06042°N 4.63760°W	GDL00330	
Castle Toward	Estate	31 March 2007	55.87094°N 5.01215°W	GDL00097	
Islay House	Estate	31 March 2006	55.78481°N 6.25695°W	GDL00228	
Colonsay House	Estate	31 March 2007	56.09251°N 6.18646°W	GDL00106	
Torosay Castle (Duart House)	Estate	1 July 1987	56.45935°N 5.68763°W	GDL00376	
Ardchattan Priory	Estate	1 July 1987	56.46385°N 5.29353°W	GDL00019	
Ardanaiseig House	Estate	1 July 1987	56.37836°N 5.10049°W	GDL00018	
An Cala	Garden	1 July 1987	56.29533°N 5.64153°W	GDL00013	
Inveraray Castle	Estate	1 July 1987	56.24820°N 5.06689°W	GDL00223	
Arduaine gardens	Garden	1 July 1987	56.23444°N 5.56017°W	GDL00025	
Crarae Gardens	Garden	1 July 1987	56.12699°N 5.24337°W	GDL00118	
Duntrune Castle	Estate	1 July 1987	56.10409°N 5.54817°W	GDL00163	
Benmore Botanic Garden	Botanic Garden	1 July 1987	56.03253°N 4.99696°W	GDL00056	
Ballimore House	Estate	1 July 1987	55.99663°N 5.32663°W	GDL00041	
Mount Stuart House	Estate	1 July 1987	55.79259°N 5.02424°W	GDL00291	
Achamore House	Estate	1 July 1987	55.66650°N 5.74973°W	GDL00005	
Linn Botanic Gardens	Botanic Gardens	20 December 2012	56.00371°N 4.85086°W	GDL00401	
Glenarn	Estate	1 July 1987	56.01841°N 4.76974°W	GDL00193	
Ardkinglas and Strone	Estate	1 July 1987	56.24445°N 4.95760°W	GDL00022	
Achnacloich	Estate	1 July 1987	56.45307°N 5.31946°W	GDL00007	
Stonefield Castle	Estate	1 July 1987	55.88911°N 5.41579°W	GDL00350	

== Clackmannanshire ==
Name	Type	Date listed	Coordinates	Designation	Image
Castle Campbell	Estate	31 March 2007	56.17397°N 3.67482°W	GDL00089	
Japanese garden at Cowden	Garden	25 July 2013	56.17974°N 3.64203°W	GDL00402	

== Dumfries and Galloway ==
Name	Type	Date listed	Coordinates	Designation	Image
Drumlanrig Castle	Estate	1 July 1987	55.28292°N 3.80451°W	GDL00143	
Raehills House	Estate	1 July 1987	55.23085°N 3.46611°W	GDL00322	
Maxwelton (Glencairn Castle)	Estate	1 July 1987	55.18787°N 3.85166°W	GDL00276	
Dalswinton	Estate	1 July 1987	55.14218°N 3.65628°W	GDL00131	
Cowhill Tower	Estate	1 July 1987	55.12682°N 3.64660°W	GDL00109	
Lochryan	Estate	1 July 1987	54.97983°N 5.02270°W	GDL00266	
Kinmount House	Estate	1 July 1987	55.00196°N 3.34664°W	GDL00244	
Castle Kennedy	Estate	1 July 1987	54.91836°N 4.95390°W	GDL00093	
Threave Gardens	Estate	1 July 1987	54.92431°N 3.94493°W	GDL00372	
Arbigland	Estate	1 July 1987	54.90448°N 3.57665°W	GDL00015	
Cally Palace	Estate	1 July 1987	54.87327°N 4.17653°W	GDL00079	
Broughton House	Estate	1 July 1987	54.83704°N 4.05523°W	GDL00075	
Ardwell Gardens	Estate	1 July 1987	54.77553°N 4.95552°W	GDL00026	
Galloway House	Estate	1 July 1987	54.77765°N 4.36929°W	GDL00185	
Logan House (Balzieland)	Estate	1 July 1987	54.74451°N 4.95506°W	GDL00268	
Monreith House	Estate	1 July 1987	54.75602°N 4.55140°W	GDL00287	
Logan Botanic Garden	Botanic Garden	1 July 1987	54.74170°N 4.95962°W	GDL00267	
Lochnaw Castle	Estate	2 April 2019	54.91835°N 5.13606°W	GDL00407	
Glenwhan Gardens And Arboretum	Garden	23 August 2023	54.88809°N 4.88292°W	GDL00411	
Crawick Multiverse	Sculpture park	28 March 2024	55.38226°N 3.93281°W	GDL00413	
Garden of Cosmic Speculation	Sculpture park	22 September 2025	55.13060°N 3.66666°W	GDL00417	

== Dundee City ==
Name	Type	Date listed	Coordinates	Designation	Image
Balgay Park	Public park	31 March 2007	56.46451°N 3.01331°W	GDL00039	
Baxter Park	Public park	31 March 2006	56.47175°N 2.95080°W	GDL00051	
Camperdown Country Park	Public park	1 July 1987	56.48361°N 3.04099°W	GDL00082	

== East Ayrshire ==
Name	Type	Date listed	Coordinates	Designation	Image
Craigengillan	Estate	31 March 2006	55.30783°N 4.42161°W	GDL00111	
Caprington Castle	Estate	31 March 2006	55.59265°N 4.52813°W	GDL00084	
Lanfine	Estate	31 March 2007	55.60239°N 4.30516°W	GDL00252	
Skeldon House	Estate	31 March 2007	55.39196°N 4.56913°W	GDL00342	
Dumfries House	Estate	1 July 1987	55.45583°N 4.30379°W	GDL00149	
Rowallan Castle	Estate	1 July 1987	55.64986°N 4.48953°W	GDL00333	
Loudoun Castle	Estate	1 July 1987	55.61128°N 4.36862°W	GDL00269	

== East Dunbartonshire ==
Name	Type	Date listed	Coordinates	Designation	Image
Milngavie Reservoirs	Reservoir	6 September 2018	55.95287°N 4.30779°W	GDL00408	

== East Lothian ==
Name	Type	Date listed	Coordinates	Designation	Image
Balgone House	Estate	31 March 2001	56.03061°N 2.69995°W	GDL00040	
Tyninghame House	Estate	1 July 1987	56.01701°N 2.61674°W	GDL00380	
Luffness Castle	Estate	1 July 1987	56.01177°N 2.84198°W	GDL00270	
Gosford House	Estate	1 July 1987	55.99182°N 2.87036°W	GDL00200	
Broxmouth Park	Park	31 March 2001	55.99255°N 2.48842°W	GDL00076	
Biel House	Estate	1 July 1987	55.97160°N 2.58815°W	GDL00057	
Cockenzie House	Estate	31 March 2001	55.97000°N 2.96250°W	GDL00105	
Seton Castle	Estate	1 July 1987	55.96535°N 2.93453°W	GDL00340	
Carberry Tower	Estate	1 July 1987	55.91463°N 3.01479°W	GDL00085	
Stevenson House	Estate	1 July 1987	55.96483°N 2.73006°W	GDL00347	
Whittingehame	Estate	1 July 1987	55.94785°N 2.63945°W	GDL00385	
St Mary's Pleasance (Haddington Garden)	Estate	1 July 1987	55.95390°N 2.77353°W	GDL00346	
Lennoxlove House	Estate	1 July 1987	55.93924°N 2.77874°W	GDL00259	
Newhailes House	Estate	31 March 2001	55.94194°N 3.07798°W	GDL00296	
Pinkie House	Estate	31 March 2001	55.94276°N 3.04068°W	GDL00313	
Dunglass Castle	Estate	1 July 1987	55.93584°N 2.38613°W	GDL00154	
Dirleton Castle	Estate	1 July 1987	56.04605°N 2.77901°W	GDL00136	
Leuchie	Estate	1 July 1987	56.03942°N 2.68674°W	GDL00262	
Pilmuir	Estate	31 March 2001	55.91464°N 2.82317°W	GDL00312	
Saltoun Hall	Estate	1 July 1987	55.90487°N 2.86646°W	GDL00336	
Yester House	Estate	1 July 1987	55.89370°N 2.72527°W	GDL00388	
Greywalls	Estate	1 July 1987	56.04169°N 2.81910°W	GDL00204	
Winton Castle	Estate	1 July 1987	55.91562°N 2.90487°W	GDL00387	

== East Renfrewshire ==
Name	Type	Date listed	Coordinates	Designation	Image
Rouken Glen Park	Public park	31 March 2006	55.79534°N 4.31693°W	GDL00332	
Greenbank Garden	Estate	1 July 1987	55.78144°N 4.29558°W	GDL00203	

== Edinburgh, City of ==
Name	Type	Date listed	Coordinates	Designation	Image
Dalmeny House	Estate	1 July 1987	55.98526°N 3.34010°W	GDL00130	
Dundas Castle	Estate	31 March 2001	55.97554°N 3.41224°W	GDL00151	
Lauriston Castle	Estate	1 July 1987	55.97053°N 3.27846°W	GDL00255	
Craigiehall	Estate	1 July 1987	55.96590°N 3.33169°W	GDL00113	
Royal Botanic Garden Edinburgh	Botanic Garden	1 July 1987	55.96507°N 3.20853°W	GDL00334	
New Town Gardens	Garden	31 March 2001	55.95458°N 3.20210°W	GDL00367	
Millburn Tower	Estate	1 July 1987	55.93189°N 3.32799°W	GDL00286	
Cammo House	Estate	31 March 2001	55.95631°N 3.32258°W	GDL00081	
Newliston	Estate	1 July 1987	55.94584°N 3.42820°W	GDL00298	
Holyrood Palace	Estate	1 July 1987	55.94657°N 3.16212°W	GDL00308	
Dean Cemetery	Cemetery	31 March 2001	55.95303°N 3.22250°W	GDL00135	
Duddingston House	Estate	1 July 1987	55.94014°N 3.13633°W	GDL00147	
Prestonfield House	Estate	1 July 1987	55.93672°N 3.15668°W	GDL00319	
The Drum	Estate	1 July 1987	55.90865°N 3.11769°W	GDL00356	
Haltoun House	Estate	31 March 2001	55.90453°N 3.39354°W	GDL00209	
Craigmillar Castle	Estate	31 March 2001	55.92494°N 3.14357°W	GDL00115	
Malleny House and Garden	Estate	1 July 1987	55.88533°N 3.33595°W	GDL00272	

== Falkirk ==
Name	Type	Date listed	Coordinates	Designation	Image
Callendar House	Estate	31 March 2007	55.99243°N 3.76946°W	GDL00078	
Dunmore Park	Estate	1 July 1987	56.07876°N 3.79419°W	GDL00158	
Dunmore Pineapple	Estate	1 July 1987	56.07607°N 3.78608°W	GDL00368	

== Fife ==
Name	Type	Date listed	Coordinates	Designation	Image
Balcarres House	Estate	31 March 2005	56.22923°N 2.84129°W	GDL00036	
Cambo Estate	Estate	31 March 2005	56.29299°N 2.64512°W	GDL00080	
Charleton House	Estate	31 March 2005	56.22510°N 2.87328°W	GDL00100	
Dunimarle Castle	Estate	31 March 2005	56.06121°N 3.64473°W	GDL00155	
Dysart House And Ravenscraig Park	Public park	31 March 2005	56.12178°N 3.13200°W	GDL00167	
House of Falkland	Estate	31 March 2005	56.25258°N 3.24016°W	GDL00214	
Fordell Castle	Estate	31 March 2005	56.05386°N 3.36616°W	GDL00182	
Lahill	Estate	31 March 2005	56.22268°N 2.90218°W	GDL00251	
Leslie House	Estate	31 March 2005	56.20220°N 3.18879°W	GDL00260	
Melville House	Estate	31 March 2005	56.30749°N 3.13513°W	GDL00283	
Raith Park And Beveridge Park	Public park	31 March 2005	56.11112°N 3.20419°W	GDL00323	
St Colme	Estate	31 March 2005	56.04453°N 3.31995°W	GDL00345	
Wemyss Castle	Estate	31 March 2005	56.14474°N 3.09187°W	GDL00384	
Naughton	Estate	1 July 1987	56.40969°N 3.01476°W	GDL00293	
Earlshall Castle	Estate	1 July 1987	56.37906°N 2.87340°W	GDL00168	
Hill of Tarvit	Estate	1 July 1987	56.29582°N 3.00797°W	GDL00211	
Falkland Palace	Estate	1 July 1987	56.25494°N 3.20750°W	GDL00176	
Kellie Castle	Estate	1 July 1987	56.23744°N 2.77554°W	GDL00234	
Balcaskie	Estate	1 July 1987	56.22394°N 2.76920°W	GDL00037	
Tulliallan Castle	Estate	1 July 1987	56.07805°N 3.71352°W	GDL00379	
Valleyfield	Estate	1 July 1987	56.06825°N 3.59728°W	GDL00381	
Pittencrieff Park	Public park	1 July 1987	56.06856°N 3.46713°W	GDL00315	
The Murrel	Estate	1 July 1987	56.06571°N 3.30656°W	GDL00365	
Culross Abbey House	Estate	1 July 1987	56.05944°N 3.61958°W	GDL00123	
Aberdour Castle	Estate	1 July 1987	56.05380°N 3.29678°W	GDL00003	
Craigtoun Country Park	Garden	31 March 2005	56.31936°N 2.84501°W	GDL00117	
St Andrews Links	Golfcourse	31 March 2005	56.35537°N 2.81677°W	GDL00344	
Balbirnie House	Estate	1 July 1987	56.20908°N 3.14856°W	GDL00034	
St Andrews Botanic Garden	Botanic Garden	7 November 2016	56.33542°N 2.80619°W	GDL00405	

== Glasgow City ==
Name	Type	Date listed	Coordinates	Designation	Image
Victoria Park	Public park	31 March 2006	55.87650°N 4.33371°W	GDL00382	
Kelvingrove Park	Public park	31 March 2006	55.86924°N 4.28586°W	GDL00235	
Glasgow Botanic Gardens	Botanic Garden	1 July 1987	55.88014°N 4.29064°W	GDL00190	
Glasgow Necropolis	Cemetery	1 July 1987	55.86252°N 4.23111°W	GDL00366	
Pollok Country Park	Country park	1 July 1987	55.82754°N 4.31693°W	GDL00317	

== Highland ==
Name	Type	Date listed	Coordinates	Designation	Image
Ardross Castle	Estate	31 March 2003	57.73325°N 4.32765°W	GDL00023	
Novar House	Estate	31 March 2003	57.68143°N 4.32245°W	GDL00303	
Cromarty House	Estate	31 March 2003	57.67462°N 4.02704°W	GDL00120	
Castle of Mey	Estate	1 July 1987	58.64690°N 3.22284°W	GDL00096	
Tongue House	Estate	1 July 1987	58.49019°N 4.41484°W	GDL00375	
Dunbeath Castle	Estate	31 March 2003	58.23765°N 3.43951°W	GDL00150	
Dunrobin Castle	Estate	1 July 1987	57.98786°N 3.93758°W	GDL00160	
Skibo Castle	Estate	1 July 1987	57.86971°N 4.13932°W	GDL00343	
Dundonnell	Estate	1 July 1987	57.82223°N 5.17998°W	GDL00152	
Inverewe Garden	Garden	1 July 1987	57.77631°N 5.60206°W	GDL00226	
House of The Geanies	Estate	1 July 1987	57.78850°N 3.86487°W	GDL00217	
Balnagown Castle	Estate	1 July 1987	57.74876°N 4.08901°W	GDL00046	
Ardgour House	Estate	31 March 2003	56.72075°N 5.27283°W	GDL00020	
Glenborrodale Castle	Estate	31 March 2003	56.67844°N 5.91071°W	GDL00195	
Ardtornish	Estate	1 July 1987	56.56316°N 5.74071°W	GDL00024	
Castle Leod	Estate	31 March 2003	57.59851°N 4.53457°W	GDL00094	
The Fairy Glen	Nature Reserve	31 March 2003	57.59450°N 4.12535°W	GDL00357	
The Spa Gardens	Garden	31 March 2003	57.58671°N 4.53810°W	GDL00370	
Brahan Castle	Estate	1 July 1987	57.55976°N 4.47776°W	GDL00068	
Rosehaugh House	Estate	31 March 2003	57.57235°N 4.20646°W	GDL00326	
Fairburn	Estate	1 July 1987	57.53842°N 4.56845°W	GDL00174	
Cawdor Castle	Estate	1 July 1987	57.51281°N 3.92419°W	GDL00099	
Dunvegan Castle	Estate	1 July 1987	57.44752°N 6.58948°W	GDL00164	
Dalcross Castle	Estate	1 July 1987	57.50896°N 4.04017°W	GDL00125	
Culloden House	Estate	31 March 2003	57.49014°N 4.13617°W	GDL00122	
Tomnahurich Cemetery	Cemetery	31 March 2003	57.46795°N 4.24278°W	GDL00374	
Beaufort Castle	Estate	31 March 2003	57.45200°N 4.48928°W	GDL00052	
Dochfour	Estate	31 March 2003	57.42580°N 4.32072°W	GDL00137	
Raasay House	Estate	31 March 2003	57.35644°N 6.07181°W	GDL00321	
Aldourie Castle	Estate	31 March 2003	57.40243°N 4.32515°W	GDL00011	
Castle Grant	Estate	31 March 2003	57.34886°N 3.59453°W	GDL00092	
Aultmore	Estate	31 March 2003	57.27471°N 3.63682°W	GDL00032	
Doune of Rothiemurchus	Estate	31 March 2003	57.15867°N 3.83211°W	GDL00139	
Kinrara	Estate	31 March 2003	57.15362°N 3.86634°W	GDL00246	
Armadale Castle	Estate	1 July 1987	57.07067°N 5.90070°W	GDL00028	
Kinloch Castle	Estate	31 March 2003	57.01219°N 6.28084°W	GDL00242	
Achnacarry Castle	Estate	1 July 1987	56.94448°N 4.99336°W	GDL00006	
Arisaig House	Estate	31 March 2003	56.89517°N 5.79341°W	GDL00027	
Eilean Shona	Estate	31 March 2003	56.78994°N 5.84165°W	GDL00171	
Kinlochmoidart	Estate	31 March 2003	56.78672°N 5.74344°W	GDL00243	
Corrour Lodge	Estate	31 March 2003	56.78642°N 4.60284°W	GDL00107	
Làrach Mòr	Garden	31 March 2003	56.91056°N 5.82521°W	GDL00254	
Leckmelm	Garden	31 March 2003	57.87215°N 5.10195°W	GDL00256	
Lochalsh Woodland Walks	Garden	1 July 1987	57.28544°N 5.65081°W	GDL00043	
Leys Castle	Estate	31 March 2003	57.44089°N 4.20145°W	GDL00264	
Belladrum Estate	Estate	2 June 2025	57.44225°N 4.46789°W	GDL00415	
Reelig (Easter Moniack)	Estate	22 July 2025	57.45982°N 4.40429°W	GDL00416	

== Inverclyde ==
Name	Type	Date listed	Coordinates	Designation	Image
Ardgowan House	Estate	1 July 1987	55.91726°N 4.87139°W	GDL00021	
Duchal House	Estate	31 March 2006	55.87825°N 4.63640°W	GDL00146	
Finlaystone House	Estate	1 July 1987	55.92745°N 4.62125°W	GDL00180	

== Midlothian ==
Name	Type	Date listed	Coordinates	Designation	Image
Dalkeith Palace	Estate	1 July 1987	55.90855°N 3.06011°W	GDL00128	
Melville Castle	Estate	1 July 1987	55.88971°N 3.10219°W	GDL00282	
Newbattle Abbey	Estate	31 March 2001	55.88115°N 3.06662°W	GDL00295	
Oxenfoord Castle	Estate	1 July 1987	55.88056°N 2.98025°W	GDL00307	
Mavisbank House	Estate	1 July 1987	55.87669°N 3.13504°W	GDL00275	
Roslin Glen Country Park	Country park	31 March 2001	55.86170°N 3.14775°W	GDL00327	
Arniston House	Estate	1 July 1987	55.83235°N 3.07110°W	GDL00029	
Penicuik House	Estate	1 July 1987	55.81766°N 3.25089°W	GDL00311	
Newhall	Estate	31 March 2001	55.79502°N 3.31424°W	GDL00297	
Preston Hall	Estate	1 July 1987	55.88500°N 2.96572°W	GDL00320	

== Moray ==
Name	Type	Date listed	Coordinates	Designation	Image
Doune of Relugas	Estate	31 March 2005	57.52048°N 3.67238°W	GDL00325	
Cullen House	Estate	1 July 1987	57.67971°N 2.82701°W	GDL00121	
Innes House	Estate	1 July 1987	57.66659°N 3.20637°W	GDL00221	
Gordon Castle	Estate	1 July 1987	57.62746°N 3.07237°W	GDL00198	
Brodie Castle	Estate	1 July 1987	57.59751°N 3.70979°W	GDL00072	
Pluscarden Abbey	Estate	1 July 1987	57.60009°N 3.43743°W	GDL00316	
Darnaway Castle	Estate	1 July 1987	57.57526°N 3.68083°W	GDL00133	
Cluny Hill	Estate	31 March 2006	57.61000°N 3.60182°W	GDL00201	
Blackhills House	Estate	27 September 2018	57.61015°N 3.21866°W	GDL00409	

== North Ayrshire ==
Name	Type	Date listed	Coordinates	Designation	Image
Blair Estate	Estate	31 March 2007	55.69493°N 4.69772°W	GDL00061	
Annick Lodge and Greenville	Estate	31 March 2006	55.64060°N 4.61103°W	GDL00014	
Kelburn Castle	Estate	1 July 1987	55.77204°N 4.84203°W	GDL00233	
Eglinton Castle	Estate	1 July 1987	55.64681°N 4.66593°W	GDL00170	
Brodick Castle	Estate	1 July 1987	55.59751°N 5.15704°W	GDL00071	

== North Lanarkshire ==
Name	Type	Date listed	Coordinates	Designation	Image
Dalzell House	Estate	1 July 1987	55.77173°N 3.97861°W	GDL00132	
Colzium Lennox Estate	Estate	17 February 2021	55.98266°N 4.03646°W	GDL00410	

== Orkney Islands ==
Name	Type	Date listed	Coordinates	Designation	Image
Skaill House	Estate	31 March 2003	59.04756°N 3.33449°W	GDL00341	
Balfour Castle	Estate	31 March 2003	59.03406°N 2.91927°W	GDL00038	
Melsetter House	Estate	1 July 1987	58.78567°N 3.26149°W	GDL00281	

== Outer Hebrides ==
Name	Type	Date listed	Coordinates	Designation	Image
Lews Castle and Lady Lever Park	Public park	31 March 2003	58.21002°N 6.40259°W	GDL00263	

== Perth and Kinross ==
Name	Type	Date listed	Coordinates	Designation	Image
Monzie Castle	Estate	31 March 2006	56.39975°N 3.82678°W	GDL00290	
Errol Park	Estate	31 March 2006	56.38976°N 3.22697°W	GDL00173	
Braco	Estate	31 March 2006	56.27532°N 3.89870°W	GDL00067	
Cleish Castle	Estate	31 March 2006	56.16473°N 3.47939°W	GDL00102	
Dupplin Castle	Estate	31 March 2007	56.36218°N 3.52846°W	GDL00165	
Taymouth Castle	Estate	1 July 1987	56.59480°N 3.98395°W	GDL00354	
Meggernie Castle	Estate	1 July 1987	56.58434°N 4.35388°W	GDL00277	
Meikleour House	Estate	1 July 1987	56.53490°N 3.37118°W	GDL00279	
Rossie Priory	Estate	1 July 1987	56.46196°N 3.16571°W	GDL00331	
Scone Palace	Estate	1 July 1987	56.42759°N 3.43142°W	GDL00338	
Methven Castle	Estate	1 July 1987	56.41690°N 3.54106°W	GDL00285	
Megginch Castle	Estate	1 July 1987	56.40669°N 3.23380°W	GDL00278	
Ochtertyre	Estate	1 July 1987	56.39072°N 3.87622°W	GDL00304	
Kinross House	Estate	1 July 1987	56.20862°N 3.41213°W	GDL00247	
Inchyra	Estate	1 July 1987	56.37815°N 3.31437°W	GDL00220	
Castle Menzies	Estate	1 July 1987	56.62505°N 3.90273°W	GDL00095	
Abercairny	Estate	1 July 1987	56.37627°N 3.76610°W	GDL00002	
Aberuchill Castle	Estate	1 July 1987	56.36477°N 4.02224°W	GDL00004	
Battleby	Estate	1 July 1987	56.44555°N 3.48528°W	GDL00050	
Balmanno Castle	Estate	1 July 1987	56.32631°N 3.38429°W	GDL00044	
Fingask Castle	Estate	1 July 1987	56.43571°N 3.24923°W	GDL00179	
Murthly Castle	Estate	1 July 1987	56.53375°N 3.51611°W	GDL00292	
Dunira	Estate	1 July 1987	56.38845°N 4.05448°W	GDL00156	
The Hermitage	Estate	1 July 1987	56.55806°N 3.61333°W	GDL00363	
Dunkeld House	Estate	1 July 1987	56.56708°N 3.60004°W	GDL00157	
Keillour Castle	Estate	1 July 1987	56.41168°N 3.66042°W	GDL00230	
Drummond Castle	Estate	1 July 1987	56.34567°N 3.85965°W	GDL00144	
Glendoick	Estate	1 July 1987	56.39737°N 3.28444°W	GDL00196	
Kinfauns Castle	Estate	1 July 1987	56.38861°N 3.37657°W	GDL00240	
Bolfracks	Garden	1 July 1987	56.61008°N 3.92001°W	GDL00064	
Blair Castle	Estate	1 July 1987	56.77699°N 3.86277°W	GDL00059	
Drumkilbo	Estate	1 July 1987	56.59099°N 3.13588°W	GDL00142	
Craighall Rattray	Estate	1 July 1987	56.61647°N 3.34240°W	GDL00112	
Stobhall	Estate	1 July 1987	56.49473°N 3.40965°W	GDL00348	
Grandtully Castle	Estate	1 July 1987	56.64015°N 3.80948°W	GDL00202	
Falls of Bruar	Waterfalls	31 March 2006	56.77568°N 3.93405°W	GDL00177	
Invermay	Estate	31 March 2006	56.31755°N 3.52108°W	GDL00227	
Blair Adam	Estate	1 July 1987	56.14555°N 3.40066°W	GDL00058	
Cluny House	Estate	1 July 1987	56.64095°N 3.82935°W	GDL00104	
Branklyn Garden	Garden	1 July 1987	56.38757°N 3.41891°W	GDL00069	
Gleneagles Hotel	Golfcourse	1 July 1987	56.27939°N 3.75397°W	GDL00360	

== Renfrewshire ==
Name	Type	Date listed	Coordinates	Designation	Image
Formakin House	Estate	1 July 1987	55.90766°N 4.54242°W	GDL00183	

== Scottish Borders ==
Name	Type	Date listed	Coordinates	Designation	Image
Bowhill House	Estate	1 July 1987	55.53872°N 2.91443°W	GDL00065	
The Haining	Estate	1 July 1987	55.53875°N 2.84297°W	GDL00362	
Monteviot House	Estate	1 July 1987	55.51523°N 2.55757°W	GDL00288	
Netherbyres	Estate	1 July 1987	55.86260°N 2.09360°W	GDL00294	
Ayton Castle	Estate	1 July 1987	55.84421°N 2.11256°W	GDL00033	
Duns Castle	Estate	1 July 1987	55.78906°N 2.35897°W	GDL00161	
Manderston	Estate	1 July 1987	55.78204°N 2.30465°W	GDL00273	
Wedderburn Castle	Estate	1 July 1987	55.76861°N 2.30707°W	GDL00383	
Paxton House	Estate	1 July 1987	55.76302°N 2.10818°W	GDL00310	
Thirlestane Castle	Estate	1 July 1987	55.72837°N 2.74467°W	GDL00371	
Marchmont House	Estate	1 July 1987	55.72995°N 2.41056°W	GDL00274	
The Hirsel	Estate	1 July 1987	55.65897°N 2.27846°W	GDL00364	
Mellerstain House	Estate	1 July 1987	55.64516°N 2.56486°W	GDL00280	
Stobo Castle	Estate	1 July 1987	55.61743°N 3.32320°W	GDL00349	
Newton Don	Estate	1 July 1987	55.62444°N 2.47013°W	GDL00299	
Dawyck Botanic Garden	Botanic Garden	1 July 1987	55.59993°N 3.32547°W	GDL00134	
Traquair House	Estate	1 July 1987	55.60719°N 3.06519°W	GDL00378	
Floors Castle	Estate	1 July 1987	55.60260°N 2.46690°W	GDL00181	
Abbotsford	Estate	1 July 1987	55.59061°N 2.76651°W	GDL00001	
The Glen	Estate	1 July 1987	55.58037°N 3.12442°W	GDL00359	
Bemersyde House	Estate	1 July 1987	55.59243°N 2.65284°W	GDL00055	
Mertoun House	Estate	1 July 1987	55.57686°N 2.60558°W	GDL00284	
Kailzie Gardens	Garden	1 July 1987	55.63564°N 3.13767°W	GDL00229	
Hendersyde Park	Estate	30 June 2011	55.61249°N 2.40937°W	GDL00210	
Fairnilee	Estate	30 June 2011	55.58765°N 2.85349°W	GDL00175	
Dryburgh Abbey	Estate	30 June 2011	55.58100°N 2.64765°W	GDL00145	
Carolside	Estate	30 June 2011	55.65194°N 2.69583°W	GDL00088	
Bowland	Estate	30 June 2011	55.64960°N 2.88035°W	GDL00066	
Portmore	Estate	30 June 2011	55.73483°N 3.19303°W	GDL00318	
Ladykirk	Estate	30 June 2011	55.70638°N 2.18682°W	GDL00250	
Kimmerghame House	Estate	30 June 2011	55.75489°N 2.29255°W	GDL00239	

== Shetland Islands ==
Name	Type	Date listed	Coordinates	Designation	Image
Belmont House	Estate	31 March 2003	60.68731°N 0.97025°W	GDL00054	
Brough Lodge	Estate	31 March 2003	60.61180°N 0.94323°W	GDL00074	
Lunna House	Estate	31 March 2003	60.40474°N 1.11712°W	GDL00271	
Gardie House	Estate	31 March 2003	60.16047°N 1.11878°W	GDL00186	

== South Ayrshire ==
Name	Type	Date listed	Coordinates	Designation	Image
Auchincruive	Estate	1 July 1987	55.47772°N 4.54654°W	GDL00031	
Rozelle (La Rochelle)	Public park	1 July 1987	55.43661°N 4.62781°W	GDL00335	
Blairquhan Castle	Estate	1 July 1987	55.32195°N 4.57915°W	GDL00063	
Kilkerran House	Estate	1 July 1987	55.29225°N 4.67081°W	GDL00238	
Bargany	Estate	1 July 1987	55.27000°N 4.75542°W	GDL00047	
Glenapp Castle	Estate	1 July 1987	55.08179°N 4.98731°W	GDL00192	
Carnell Estate	Estate	1 July 1987	55.55903°N 4.43067°W	GDL00087	
Culzean Castle	Estate	1 July 1987	55.35217°N 4.78202°W	GDL00124	

== South Lanarkshire ==
Name	Type	Date listed	Coordinates	Designation	Image
Scots Mining Company House	Estate	31 March 2006	55.41453°N 3.76105°W	GDL00339	
Falls of Clyde	Waterfalls	31 March 2006	55.65710°N 3.77714°W	GDL00358	
Chatelherault Country Park	Country park	1 July 1987	55.75473°N 4.01457°W	GDL00101	
Barncluith	Estate	1 July 1987	55.76727°N 4.02563°W	GDL00048	
Lee Castle	Estate	1 July 1987	55.69368°N 3.82408°W	GDL00257	
Little Sparta	Garden	1 July 1987	55.72437°N 3.50866°W	GDL00265	

== Stirling ==
Name	Type	Date listed	Coordinates	Designation	Image
The Roman Camp	Garden	31 March 2007	56.24007°N 4.20739°W	GDL00369	
Kippenross	Park	31 March 2007	56.17660°N 3.95599°W	GDL00248	
Cardross House	Estate	31 March 2007	56.15156°N 4.24686°W	GDL00086	
Inchmahome Priory	Monastic island	31 March 2007	56.17573°N 4.29827°W	GDL00218	
Doune Park	Park	1 July 1987	56.20592°N 4.08092°W	GDL00140	
Rednock House	Estate	1 July 1987	56.17981°N 4.26029°W	GDL00324	
Blair Drummond	Estate	1 July 1987	56.17142°N 4.04856°W	GDL00060	
Keir House	Estate	1 July 1987	56.17079°N 3.98371°W	GDL00231	
Duntreath Castle	Estate	1 July 1987	55.99856°N 4.34448°W	GDL00162	
Gargunnock House	Estate	1 July 1987	56.12549°N 4.06615°W	GDL00188	
King's Knot	Earthwork	1 July 1987	56.12074°N 3.94915°W	GDL00241	
Touch House	Estate	1 July 1987	56.11106°N 4.01310°W	GDL00377	
Cowane's Hospital	Garden	16 March 2012	56.12040°N 3.94456°W	GDL00400	
Airthrey Castle	Estate	1 July 1987	56.14687°N 3.91740°W	GDL00010	

== West Dunbartonshire ==
Name	Type	Date listed	Coordinates	Designation	Image
Overtoun House	Estate	31 March 2006	55.95064°N 4.53002°W	GDL00306	
Ross Priory	Estate	1 July 1987	56.05432°N 4.54534°W	GDL00329	
Balloch Castle	Estate	1 July 1987	56.01219°N 4.58404°W	GDL00042	

== West Lothian ==
Name	Type	Date listed	Coordinates	Designation	Image
House of the Binns	Estate	1 July 1987	55.98840°N 3.52114°W	GDL00216	
Harburn House	Estate	31 March 2001	55.83249°N 3.52781°W	GDL00208	
Hopetoun House	Estate	1 July 1987	55.99006°N 3.46579°W	GDL00212	

== See also ==
- List of gardens in Scotland
- List of Historic Environment Scotland properties
- List of listed buildings in Scotland
