= Belmont House =

Belmont House may refer to:

- Belmont House, Toronto, care home in Canada
- Belmont House, Shetland, lairds house in Scotland
- Belmont House (Montevideo), hotel in Uruguay
- Belmont House, Herefordshire, country house in Herefordshire, England
- Belmont House and Gardens, country house in Kent, England
- Belmont House School, Newton Mearns, Scotland
- Belmont Manor House, Virginia, USA
- Belmont Hall, Cheshire, Cheshire, England
- Perry Belmont House, historic name for the International Temple, Washington, D.C.
- Belmont-Paul Women's Equality National Monument in Washington, D.C.
- Mrs. O. H. P. Belmont House, New York City

== See also ==
- Belmont Mansion (disambiguation)
