= Listed buildings in Scotland =

This is a list of Category A listed buildings in Scotland, which are among the listed buildings of the United Kingdom.

For a fuller list, see the pages linked on List of listed buildings in Scotland.

== Key ==
| Category | Criteria |
|---|---|
| A | Buildings of national or international importance, either architectural or historic, or fine little-altered examples of some particular period, style or building type. |
| B | Buildings of regional or more than local importance, or major examples of some particular period, style or building type which may have been altered. |
| C | Buildings of local importance, lesser examples of any period, style, or building type, as originally constructed or moderately altered; and simple traditional buildings which group well with others in categories A and B. |

The organization of the lists in this series is on the same basis as the statutory register. County names are those used in the register, and in the case of Scotland they parallel the current administrative areas.

== Category A listed buildings in Scotland ==
| Council area | Number |
|---|---|
| List of Category A listed buildings in Aberdeen | 68 |
| List of Category A listed buildings in Aberdeenshire | 210 |
| List of Category A listed buildings in Angus | 97 |
| List of Category A listed buildings in Argyll and Bute | 155 |
| List of Category A listed buildings in Clackmannanshire | 18 |
| List of Category A listed buildings in Dumfries and Galloway | 224 |
| List of Category A listed buildings in Dundee | 82 |
| List of Category A listed buildings in East Ayrshire | 45 |
| List of Category A listed buildings in East Dunbartonshire | 15 |
| List of Category A listed buildings in East Lothian | 135 |
| List of Category A listed buildings in East Renfrewshire | 5 |
| List of Category A listed buildings in Edinburgh | 909 |
| List of Category A listed buildings in Falkirk | 27 |
| List of Category A listed buildings in Fife | 214 |
| List of Category A listed buildings in Glasgow | 281 |
| List of Category A listed buildings in Highland | 190 |
| List of Category A listed buildings in Inverclyde | 25 |
| List of Category A listed buildings in Midlothian | 71 |
| List of Category A listed buildings in Moray | 117 |
| List of Category A listed buildings in North Ayrshire | 40 |
| List of Category A listed buildings in North Lanarkshire | 10 |
| List of Category A listed buildings in Orkney | 24 |
| List of Category A listed buildings in Perth and Kinross | 163 |
| List of Category A listed buildings in Renfrewshire | 36 |
| List of Category A listed buildings in the Scottish Borders | 187 |
| List of Category A listed buildings in Shetland | 13 |
| List of Category A listed buildings in South Ayrshire | 79 |
| List of Category A listed buildings in South Lanarkshire | 95 |
| List of Category A listed buildings in Stirling | 90 |
| List of Category A listed buildings in West Dunbartonshire | 20 |
| List of Category A listed buildings in West Lothian | 44 |
| List of Category A listed buildings in the Western Isles | 18 |
| TOTAL: Category A listed buildings in Scotland | 3,707 |

== See also ==
- List of castles in Scotland
- List of country houses in the United Kingdom
- List of hillforts in Scotland
- List of historic sites in Scotland
- List of monastic houses in Scotland
- List of National Trust for Scotland properties
- List of post-war Category A listed buildings in Scotland
- Listed buildings in England
- Listed buildings in Northern Ireland
- Listed buildings in Wales
- Lists of listed buildings in Scotland
- Signal boxes that are listed buildings in Scotland
