= List of hotels: Countries U =

This is a list of what are intended to be the notable top hotels by country, five or four star hotels, notable skyscraper landmarks or historic hotels which are covered in multiple reliable publications. It should not be a directory of every hotel in every country:

== Uruguay ==
- Belmont House, Montevideo
- Casapueblo, Punta del Este
- Four Seasons Resort Carmelo, Uruguay, Carmelo
- Hotel Carrasco, Montevideo
- Radisson Montevideo Victoria Plaza Hotel, Montevideo
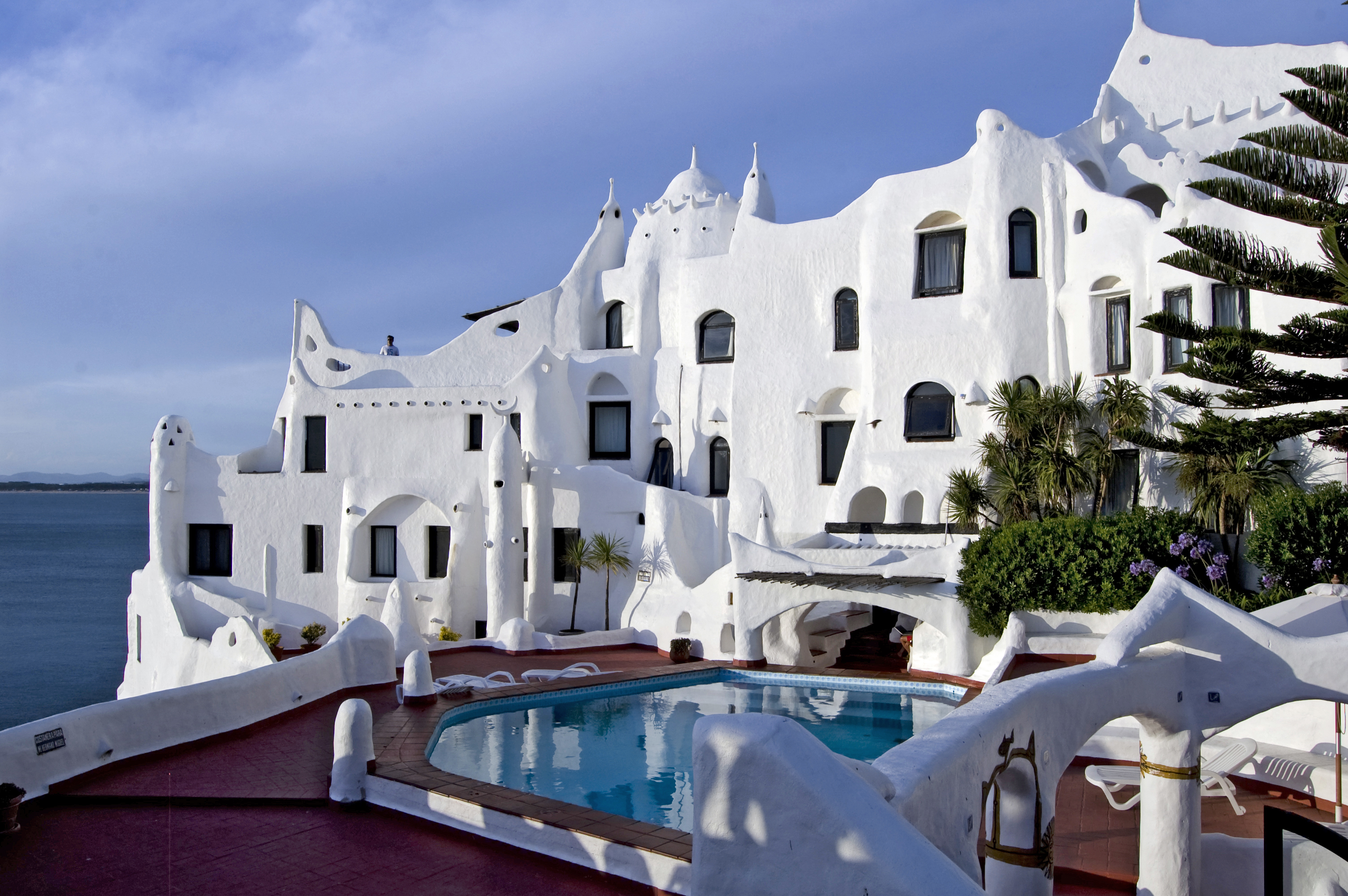
Casapueblo

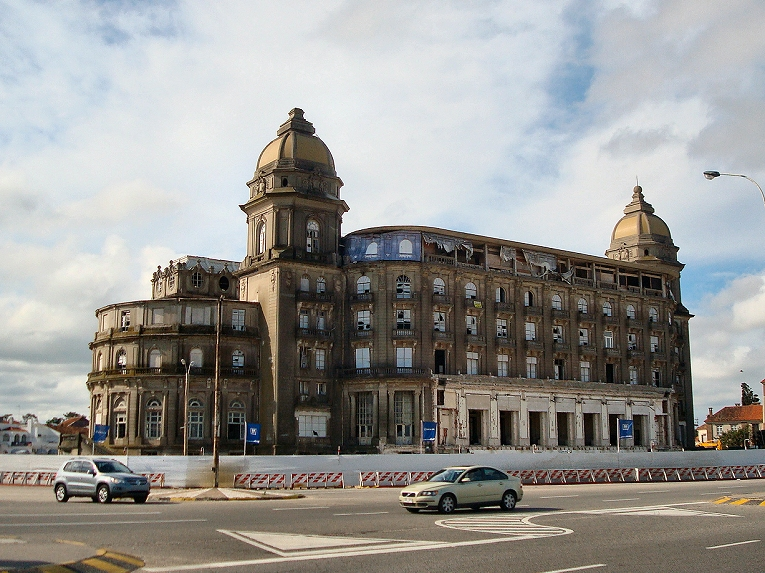
Hotel Carrasco

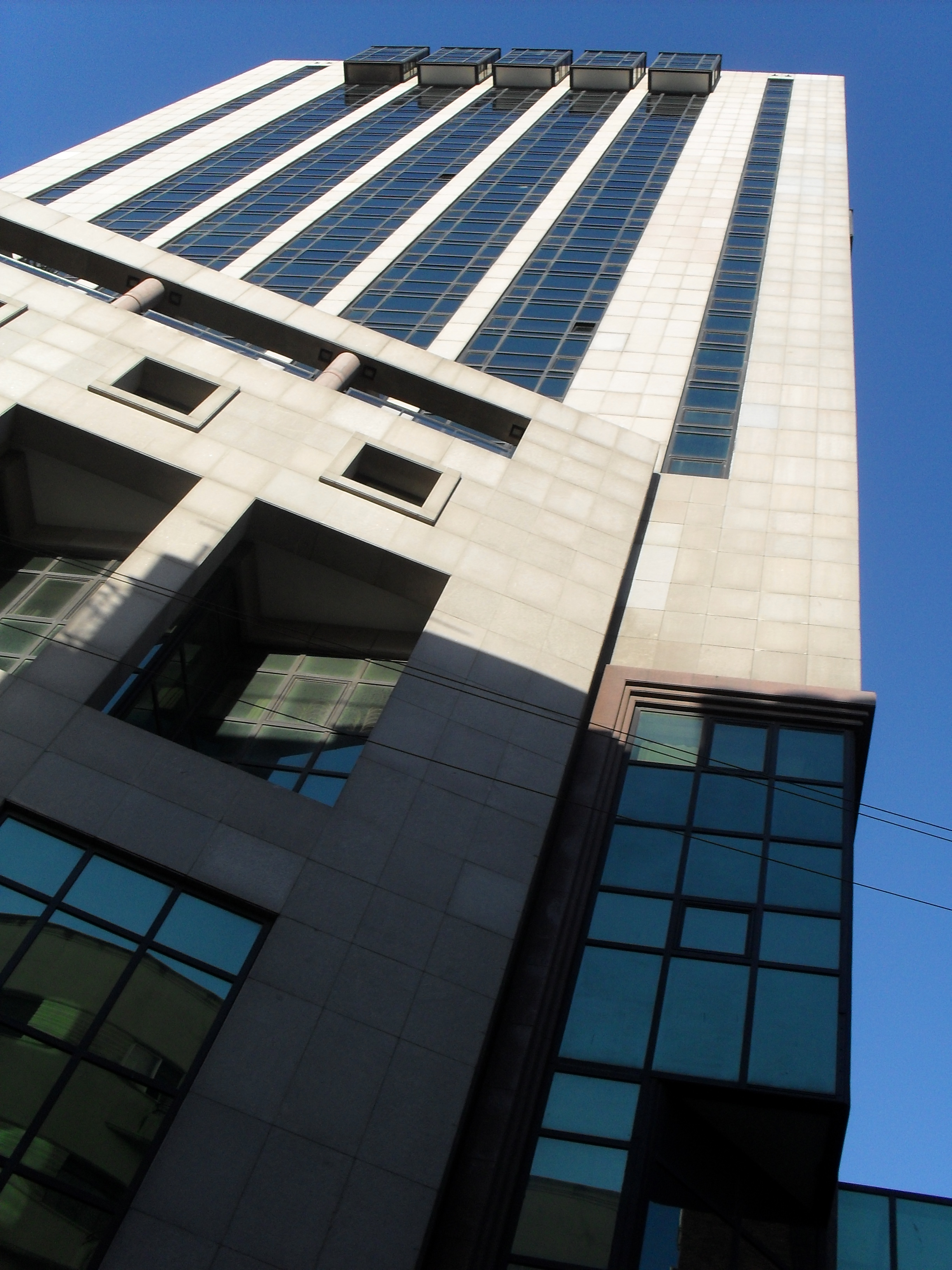
Radisson Montevideo Victoria Plaza Hotel
