= Lists of scheduled monuments in Scotland =

Scheduled monuments are sites of archaeological importance with specific legal protection against damage or development. The list of such monuments in Scotland is maintained by Historic Environment Scotland. The lists below show these monuments, arranged by council areas.

== Lists of scheduled monuments ==
- Scheduled monuments in Aberdeen
- Scheduled monuments in Aberdeenshire
- Scheduled monuments in Angus
- Scheduled monuments in Argyll and Bute
- Scheduled monuments in Clackmannanshire
- Scheduled monuments in Dumfries and Galloway
- Scheduled monuments in Dundee
- Scheduled monuments in East Ayrshire
- Scheduled monuments in East Dunbartonshire
- Scheduled monuments in East Lothian
- Scheduled monuments in East Renfrewshire
- Scheduled monuments in Edinburgh
- Scheduled monuments in Falkirk
- Scheduled monuments in Fife
- Scheduled monuments in Glasgow
- Scheduled monuments in Highland
- Scheduled monuments in Inverclyde
- Scheduled monuments in Midlothian
- Scheduled monuments in Moray
- Scheduled monuments in North Ayrshire
- Scheduled monuments in North Lanarkshire
- Scheduled monuments in Orkney
- Scheduled monuments in Perth and Kinross
- Scheduled monuments in Renfrewshire
- Scheduled monuments in Shetland
- Scheduled monuments in South Ayrshire
- Scheduled monuments in South Lanarkshire
- Scheduled monuments in Stirling
- Scheduled monuments in the Outer Hebrides
- Scheduled monuments in the Scottish Borders
- Scheduled monuments in West Dunbartonshire
- Scheduled monuments in West Lothian

== See also ==
- Lists of listed buildings in Scotland
- List of sites on the Inventory of Gardens and Designed Landscapes
