= Dunearn =

Hill fort in Highland, Scotland

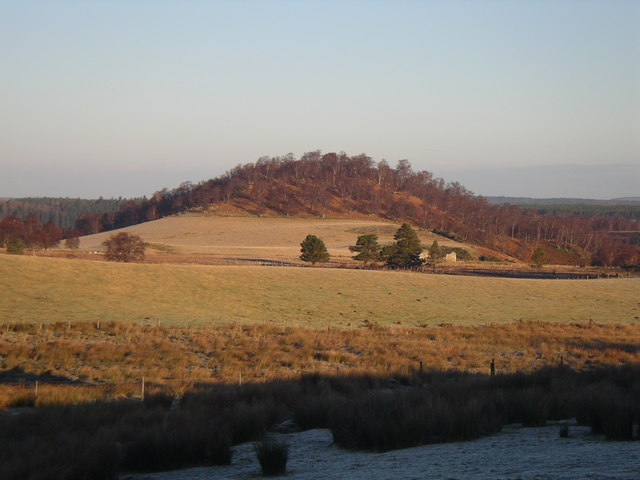
- Dunearn from the south west in winter

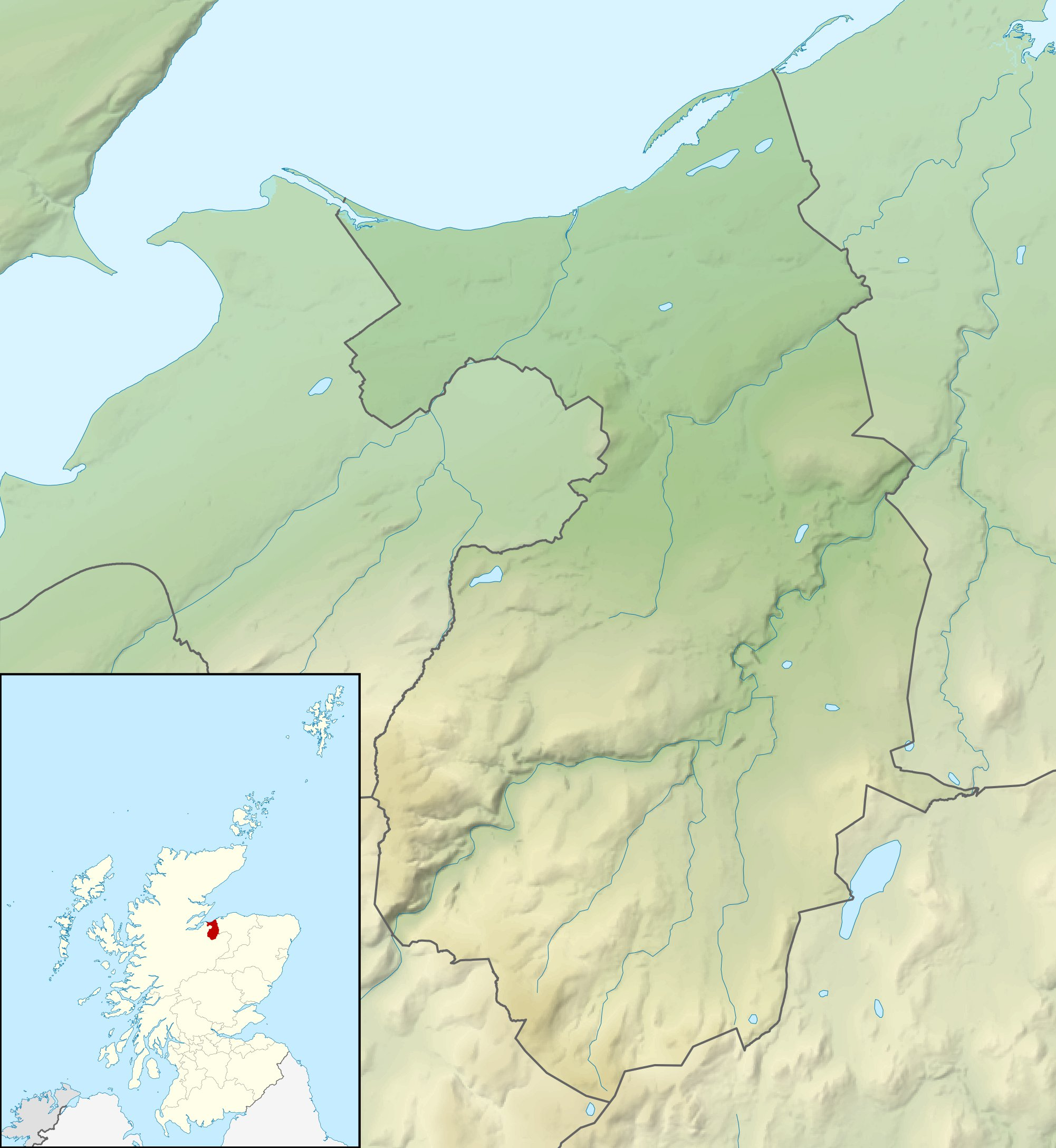
- Location within Nairn
- 57.4505°N 3.7836°W
- Type: Hill fort
- Periods: Iron Age, Pictish

Site notes
- Material: Stone, earth
- Height: 266 metres (873 ft) AOD
- Length: 245 metres (804 ft)
- Width: 45 metres (148 ft)

Dunearn is a hill fort located 15 kilometres (9.3 mi) south south east of Nairn in Highland, Scotland. It is situated on a steep-sided hill called Doune rising to approximately 266 metres (873 ft) above ordnance datum just south of Dulsie Bridge (which provides a modern crossing of the River Findhorn) in the parish of Ardclach.

The site commands uninterrupted views in all directions of the valley of the Findhorn including towards the pass of Streens in the west, which leads to upper Strath Dearn.

== Etymology ==
The modern name, which is shared by a nearby farm is from the Scottish Gaelic, Dùn Éireann meaning "Hill(fort) on the Findhorn". Although Gaelic in origin the derivation of the name of the River Findhorn itself is not absolutely clear. Watson (1926) states that it is derived from Fionn Èire, meaning "white Ireland" which "doubtless refers to the white sands of the estuary". The dative Èireann gave rise to the use of the anglified 'earn' or 'erne' in other local names such as Invererne, Cullerne and Earnhill.

== Structure ==
The slopes up to the fort are steep from all directions save the west. The summit is S-shaped and was surrounded by two parallel walls which closely followed the contour that delineates the summit plateau. The visual evidence of the inner rampart is simply scattered stones and boulders along with some evidence of vitrification, suggesting that the fort may have been burned at some point in its history. The outer wall lies about 20 feet (6.1 m) beyond the inner and is a "mere crest-line, dotted rather sparsely with stones and boulders". The proximity of the two walls to one another suggests it was designed as a single structure with stabilising timbers in the centre. The entrance lies to the south west and the enclosed area is roughly .75 hectares (1.9 acres) in extent.

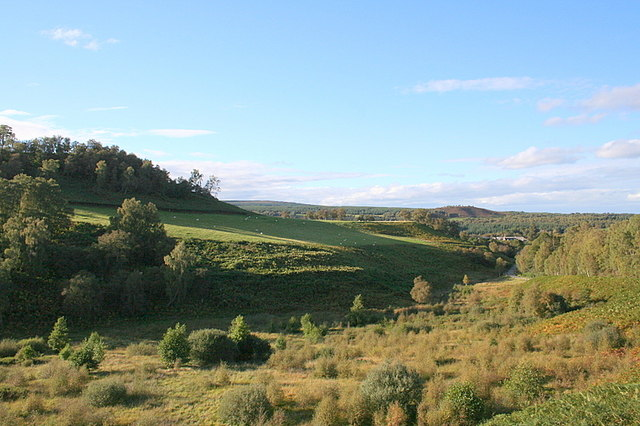
From the south east in the summer. The lower, grassy slopes lie below the remains of the ramparts in the upper wooded area.

== Local comparisons ==
Dunearn is one of a group of larger, more open, structures such as Craig Phadrig, which is thought to have been constructed in the 4th Century CE (Note: Craig Phadrig, which is much smaller than Dunearn, is popularly believed to have been the site of the Pictish king Bridei's conversion to Christianity by Columba in 565 CE, although there is no real evidence for this.) and Ord Hill of Kessock, both to the west near modern-day Inverness. There are various smaller structures in the area, such as Doune of Relugas, and Dun Earn (Note: The small fort of Dun Earn is located, rather confusingly, above the Dunearn Burn near its confluence with the River Findhorn about 2 kilometres (1.2 mi) south of Conicavel and 12 kilometres (7.5 mi) downstream from Dunearn.) lower down the Findhorn valley and Dun Evan and Castle Finlay in the Nairn valley. The existence of another large hill fort at Cluny Hill in Forres, which extends to 3.6 hectares (8.9 acres) was confirmed in 2017.

== Modern uses ==
It is thought that the relatively level summit of the hill was farmed for many years until 1906, including ploughing and it is likely that the stone remains of the fortification are "slight" as a result.

An artillery base was established in the fort during the Second World War.
