= Gardie House =

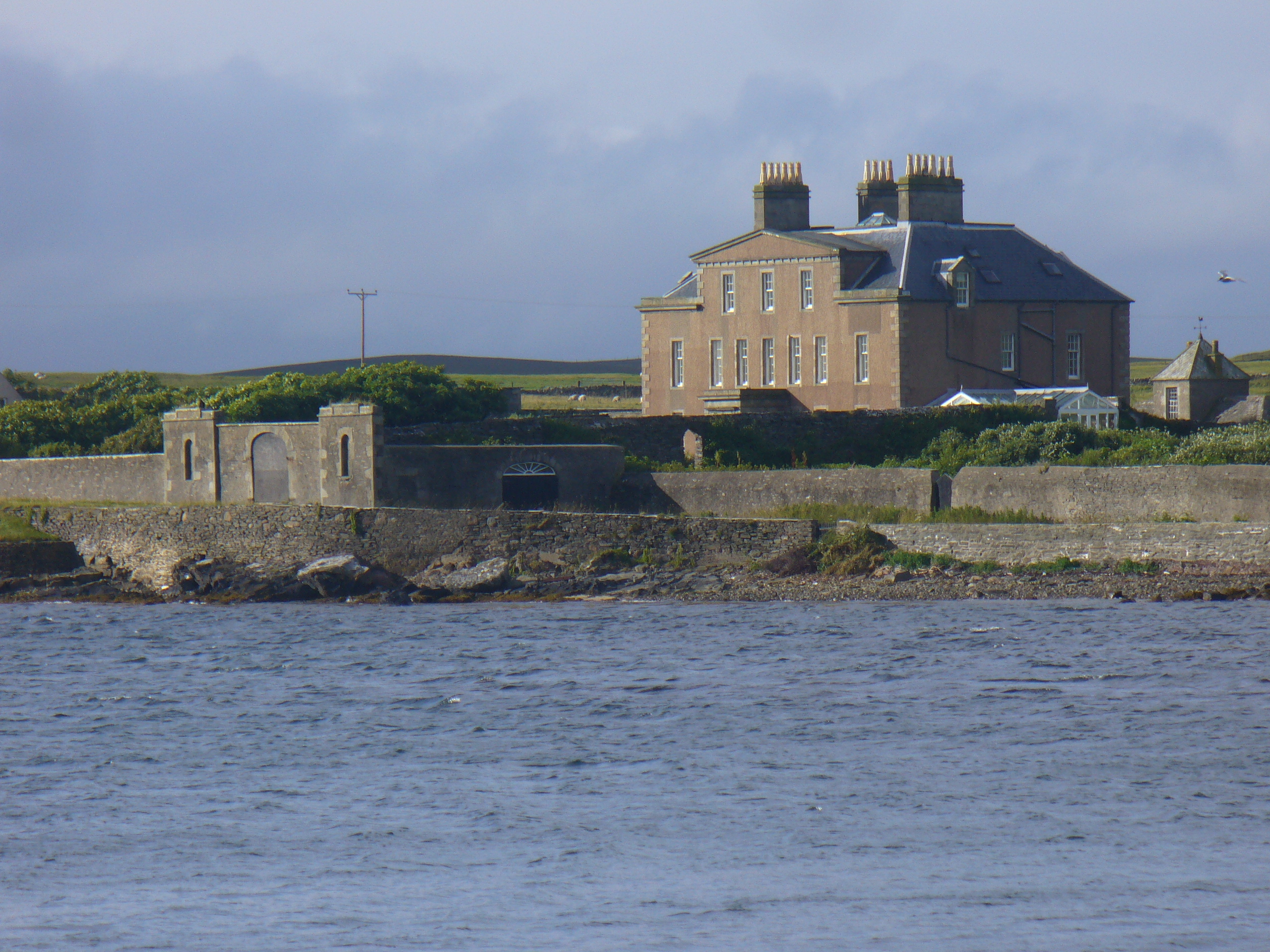
- Gardie House

- Location in Shetland
- 60.1601°N 1.1230°W

Listed Building – Category A
- Designated: 13 August 1971
- Reference no.: LB5880

Inventory of Gardens and Designed Landscapes in Scotland
- Official name: Gardie House
- Designated: 31 March 2003
- Reference no.: GDL00186

Gardie House is an 18th-century estate house on Bressay in Shetland, Scotland. Located opposite Lerwick, across the Bressay Sound, Gardie is described by Historic Scotland as an "example of the smaller Scottish country house, unique in Shetland."

The house is protected as a category A listed building, and the grounds are included in the Inventory of Gardens and Designed Landscapes in Scotland, the national listing of significant gardens.

== History ==
The Henderson family owned Gardie from the 17th century, and in 1724 Magnus Henderson (died 1753) had the present house built. The builder was a mason from Aberdeen named Forbes. The double-pile plan of Gardie was relatively novel in the early 18th century. The symmetrical arrangement of walled gardens leading down to a harbour was laid out at the same time. The drawing room contains fine wooden panelling, installed around 1750.

The house passed out of the Henderson family in 1799, and was inherited by Elizabeth Nicolson and her husband Thomas Mouat of Garth, the builder of Belmont House on Unst. Their nephew, William Mouat, added the porch and constructed the steading and Gothic cottage in the grounds. Sir Walter Scott dined at Gardie House during his 1814 visit to Shetland. In 1905 the house was altered, and remains privately owned. In 2001, the owner was John Hamilton Scott, Lord Lieutenant of Shetland.

== Description ==
The house has a symmetrical main front facing the sea of seven bays, with a central stone porch (added in 1810) and stone quoins. There were originally two storeys plus attics; the upper part was extended in around 1905 to create a shallow central pediment, five bays in width, which has three windows. The lower storeys have seven windows, with five grouped centrally flanked by a single one on either side. The other elevations are not symmetrical. The building is finished with brown-coloured harling. Outbuildings include a small stableblock and a cottage with Gothic windows. The garden gate has columns with pilasters surmounted by urns.
