= Newcastle University Faculty of Humanities and Social Sciences =

Faculty of Humanities and Social Sciences
- Type: Faculty
- Established: 1871 as Armstrong College
- Pro-Vice-Chancellor: Professor Nigel Harkness
- Location: Newcastle upon Tyne, Tyne & Wear, England
- Colours: Old Gold
- Affiliations: Newcastle University
- Website: www.ncl.ac.uk/hass

The Newcastle University Faculty of Humanities and Social Science (HaSS) is the largest of the three faculties at Newcastle University.

In its current form, the Faculty of Humanities and Social Science contains nine schools, a graduate school and a language centre (INTO).

The faculty offers over seventy undergraduate degrees, postgraduate degrees and research opportunities, and has a number of research centres.

== Schools ==
The ten schools within the faculty are:

- Architecture, Planning & Landscape
- Arts & Cultures
- Newcastle University Business School
- Education, Communication & Language Sciences
- English Literature, Language & Linguistics
- Geography, Politics & Sociology
- History, Classics & Archaeology
- Newcastle Law School
- Modern Languages
- School X

== Research centres ==
- Centre for Gender and Women's Studies
- Centre for Learning and Teaching
- Centre for Knowledge, Innovation, Technology and Enterprise
- Centre for Research in Linguistics and Language Sciences
- Centre for Urban and Regional Development Studies
- Global Urban Research Unit (GURU)
- Northern Centre for the History of Medicine
- Policy, Ethics and Life Sciences
- McCord Centre for Landscape
