= Designed landscape =

A designed landscape is an area of land which has been modified by people for primarily aesthetic effect. The term is used by historians to denote various types of site, such as gardens, parks, cemeteries, and estates. Such sites are often protected for their historic or artistic value.

A designed landscape may comprise landform, water, built structures, trees and plants, all of which may be naturally occurring or introduced.

== Overview ==
Many designed landscapes take advantage of existing geographical features, emphasising them through the planting of woodlands, or the creation of artificial lakes. For example, the parklands created by landscape gardeners such as Lancelot "Capability" Brown, are designed landscapes.

They may also be more subtle, resulting from the enclosure of land, and the planting of functional woodlands such as shelter belts. Patterns of such features may be of use to historians in identifying the extent of country estates, and in dating agricultural improvements.

== See also ==
- Historic garden conservation
- McCord Centre for Landscape
- National Register of Historic Parks and Gardens
- Inventory of Gardens and Designed Landscapes in Scotland
