= List of Category A listed buildings in Dundee =

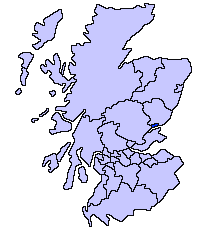
Dundee shown within Scotland

This is a list of Category A listed buildings in the Dundee council area in eastern Scotland.

In Scotland, the term listed building refers to a building or other structure officially designated as being of "special architectural or historic interest". Category A structures are those considered to be "buildings of national or international importance, either architectural or historic, or fine little-altered examples of some particular period, style or building type". Listing was begun by a provision in the Town and Country Planning (Scotland) Act 1947, and the current legislative basis for listing is the Planning (Listed Buildings and Conservation Areas) (Scotland) Act 1997. The authority for listing rests with Historic Environment Scotland. In 2015 it succeeded Historic Scotland, an executive agency of the Scottish Government, which had inherited this role from the Scottish Development Department in 1991. Once listed, severe restrictions are imposed on the modifications allowed to a building's structure or its fittings. Listed building consent must be obtained from local authorities prior to any alteration to such a structure. There are approximately 47,400 listed buildings in Scotland, of which around 8% (some 3,800) are Category A.

The council area of Dundee covers 67 square kilometres (26 sq mi), and has a population of around 152,320. There are 83 Category A listed buildings in the area.

== Listed buildings ==
Name	Location	Date listed	Geo-coordinates	Notes	LB number	Image
Benvie Mill	Benvie		56°28′15″N 3°05′32″W		10864	Upload Photo
Gray House, also known as House of Gray	Mains of Gray		56°28′35″N 3°04′36″W		12858	Upload another image See more images
Powrie Castle	Fintry		56°29′59″N 2°56′30″W		19019	Upload another image See more images
Camperdown Dock	Dundee Harbour		56°27′48″N 2°57′14″W		24923	Upload another image
Harbour, or Clocktower, Warehouse	Dundee Harbour, Victoria Dock		56°27′48″N 2°57′26″W		24932	Upload another image See more images
McManus Galleries	Dundee, Albert Square		56°27′45″N 2°58′15″W		24939	Upload another image See more images
The Coffin Mill, Logie Works	Dundee, Brook Street		56°27′43″N 2°59′19″W		24956	Upload Photo
Harbour Workshops and Patent Slip	Dundee, Marine Parade		56°27′36″N 2°57′38″W		24957	Upload Photo
Old Tay Works Mills, Engine Houses and Chimney	Dundee, Brown Street		56°27′42″N 2°58′46″W		24960	Upload another image
South Mills	Dundee, Brown Street		56°27′38″N 2°58′47″W		24965	Upload Photo
Victoria Dock with pedestrian and vehicular swing bridges	Dundee Harbour		56°27′42″N 2°57′35″W		24971	Upload Photo
Dundee Royal Infirmary, original block Out Patients Dept & Urology Theatre	Dundee, Barrack Road		56°27′55″N 2°58′51″W		24982	Upload Photo
Baxter Park Pavilion	Dundee, Baxter Park		56°28′20″N 2°57′03″W		24992	Upload another image See more images
Castle Hill House	Dundee, Castlehill		56°27′40″N 2°58′04″W		24993	Upload Photo
St Paul's Episcopal Cathedral	Dundee, Castlehill		56°27′39″N 2°58′05″W		24997	Upload another image See more images
Former Edward Street Mill	Dundee, Edward Street		56°27′41″N 2°59′25″W		25003	Upload Photo
Tay Works	Dundee, Lochee Road		56°27′44″N 2°58′45″W		25030	Upload Photo
Camperdown Works, High Mill or Sliver Mill	Dundee, Methven Street		56°28′21″N 3°00′25″W		25041	Upload Photo
Camperdown Works, Cox's Stack	Dundee, Methven Street		56°28′22″N 3°00′12″W		25044	Upload another image See more images
Mains Castle	Dundee, Caird Park		56°29′08″N 2°57′29″W		25066	Upload another image See more images
51-63 (odd nos) Commercial Street	Dundee, Commercial Street		56°27′42″N 2°58′06″W		25071	Upload Photo
73-99 (odd nos) Commercial Street, Commercial Bank	Dundee, Commercial Street		56°27′44″N 2°58′10″W		25075	Upload Photo
Camperdown House	Camperdown		56°29′04″N 3°02′34″W		25078	Upload another image See more images
Lower Dens Works	Dundee, Princes Street		56°27′56″N 2°57′47″W		25093	Upload another image
68-110 (even nos) Commercial Street (Northern Assurance Buildings)	Dundee, Commercial Street		56°27′44″N 2°58′14″W		25099	Upload another image
Upper Dens Mill	Dundee, Princes Street		56°27′58″N 2°57′46″W		25101	Upload Photo
Seafield Works (west side of Taylor's lane only)	Dundee, Taylor's Lane		56°27′17″N 2°59′39″W		25111	Upload Photo
Claverhouse Bleachfield, former Beetling House, Office and Chimney Stalk	Dundee, Claverhouse Road		56°29′31″N 2°57′46″W		25112	Upload Photo
Verdant Works	Dundee, West Henderson's Wynd		56°27′42″N 2°58′58″W		25140	Upload another image See more images
Former Exchange Coffee House	Dundee, Dock Street		56°27′37″N 2°58′03″W		25150	Upload another image
High School of Dundee	Dundee, Euclid Crescent		56°27′47″N 2°58′23″W		25177	Upload another image See more images
High School, (Former Girls' School)	Dundee, Euclid Crescent		56°27′45″N 2°58′27″W		25189	Upload Photo
Watson's Bond, HM Customs Warehouse No 4	Dundee, Seagate		56°27′47″N 2°58′00″W		25194	Upload Photo
Dudhope Castle	Dundee, Barrack Road		56°27′51″N 2°59′03″W		25195	Upload another image See more images
Wishart Arch	Dundee, East (Cowgate) Port	Delisted	56°27′54″N 2°57′51″W		25209	Upload another image
Former Dundee Foundry (stonebuilt, cast-iron framed engine shop only)	Dundee, East Dock Street		56°27′50″N 2°57′40″W		25236	Upload Photo
70-73 (inclusive nos) High Street, including Gardyne's Land, Gray's Close, including clock and model of the town house	Dundee, High Street		56°27′40″N 2°58′11″W		25239	Upload another image See more images
74, 75 and 76 High Street	Dundee, High Street		56°27′40″N 2°58′11″W		25243	Upload Photo
77–80 (inclusive nos) High Street and returns to Murraygate/Commercial Street (Arnott's)	Dundee, High Street		56°27′42″N 2°58′10″W		25247	Upload Photo
Caird Hall	Dundee, City Square		56°27′35″N 2°58′13″W		25258	Upload another image See more images
St Andrew's Church (Church of Scotland)	Dundee, King Street		56°27′53″N 2°58′05″W		25279	Upload another image See more images
Clepington Primary School (former Stobswell Public School)	Dundee, Eliza Street		56°28′22″N 2°57′34″W		25280	Upload another image
Morgan Academy	Dundee, Forfar Road		56°28′28″N 2°57′15″W		25288	Upload another image See more images
The Howff	Dundee, Barrack Street		56°27′42″N 2°58′22″W		25312	Upload another image See more images
St Salvador's Episcopal Church	Dundee, St Salvador Street		56°28′12″N 2°58′17″W		25314	Upload another image See more images
St Mary's RC Church	Lochee, High Street		56°28′14″N 3°00′28″W		25338	Upload Photo
Invergowrie House	Dundee, Invergowrie Drive		56°27′41″N 3°02′14″W		25369	Upload Photo
City Churches, St Mary's Tower, or The Steeple	Dundee, Nethergate		56°27′34″N 2°58′23″W		25370	Upload another image See more images
City Churches, St Clement's, or Steeple Church	Dundee, Nethergate		56°27′34″N 2°58′23″W		25374	Upload another image See more images
City Churches, Old St Paul's and St David's, or South Church	Dundee, Nethergate		56°27′34″N 2°58′21″W		25378	Upload Photo
City Churches, St Mary's East, or Dundee Parish Church	Dundee, Nethergate		56°27′34″N 2°58′20″W		25382	Upload another image See more images
Morgan Tower	Dundee, Nethergate		56°27′26″N 2°58′34″W		25402	Upload another image
136–148 (even nos) Nethergate, including remains of former sea wall to south (Miln's Buildings)	Dundee, Nethergate		56°27′28″N 2°58′27″W		25451	Upload Photo
Nethergate House (Clydesdale Bank)	Dundee, Nethergate		56°27′26″N 2°58′31″W		25458	Upload Photo
The Vine	Dundee, Magdalen Yard Road		56°27′12″N 2°59′13″W		25469	Upload Photo
Coldside Branch Public Library	Dundee, Strathmartine Road		56°28′29″N 2°58′51″W		25494	Upload another image See more images
Magdalen Green Bandstand	Dundee, Magdalen Green		56°27′11″N 2°59′41″W		25499	Upload another image See more images
Royal Exchange	Dundee, Panmure Street		56°27′48″N 2°58′15″W		25507	Upload another image
India Buildings	Dundee, Victoria Road		56°27′50″N 2°58′19″W		25515	Upload Photo
Seymour Lodge	Dundee, Perth Road		56°27′25″N 2°59′59″W		25542	Upload another image See more images
1-27 (odd nos) South Tay Street	Dundee, South Tay Street		56°27′30″N 2°58′33″W		25546	Upload Photo
St Mark's Church (Gate Fellowship)	Dundee, Perth Road		56°27′22″N 2°59′08″W		25601	Upload another image See more images
McCheyne Memorial Church	Dundee, Perth Road		56°27′22″N 2°59′44″W		25603	Upload another image See more images
Greywalls	Dundee, Perth Road		56°27′20″N 3°00′19″W		25617	Upload Photo
Former Custom House and Harbour Chambers	Dundee, Dock Street		56°27′41″N 2°57′51″W		25673	Upload another image
1-32 Springfield (inclusive nos)	Dundee, Springfield		56°27′23″N 2°59′10″W		25678	Upload Photo
Tay Railway Bridge	Dundee		56°26′20″N 2°59′19″W		25681	Upload another image See more images
Balmossie Railway Viaduct over Dichty Water	Balmossie		56°28′54″N 2°50′35″W		25739	Upload Photo
Broughty Ferry railway station	Broughty Ferry		56°28′03″N 2°52′24″W		25823	Upload another image See more images
St Luke's and Queen Street Church	Broughty Ferry, West Queen Street		56°28′10″N 2°53′00″W		25885	Upload another image See more images
Eastern Primary School	Broughty Ferry		56°28′05″N 2°52′06″W		25887	Upload another image
East Bridge over Dichty Water	Linlathen		56°29′05″N 2°52′19″W		25892	Upload another image
West Bridge over Dichty Water	Linlathen		56°29′00″N 2°52′40″W		25893	Upload Photo
Pitkerro Lodge	Pitkerro		56°29′23″N 2°53′23″W		25894	Upload Photo
Pitkerro House	Pitkerro		56°29′33″N 2°53′22″W		25895	Upload Photo
St Stephen's and West Church	Broughty Ferry, Dundee Road		56°28′05″N 2°52′55″W		25932	Upload another image See more images
Red Court	Broughty Ferry, Fairfield Road		56°28′19″N 2°54′02″W		25938	Upload Photo
Beachtower	Broughty Ferry, Ralston Road		56°28′10″N 2°54′23″W		25947	Upload Photo
Aystree	Broughty Ferry, Victoria Road		56°28′17″N 2°53′11″W		25950	Upload Photo

== See also ==
- Scheduled monuments in Dundee
