= Doune of Relugas =

Hill fort in Moray, Scotland

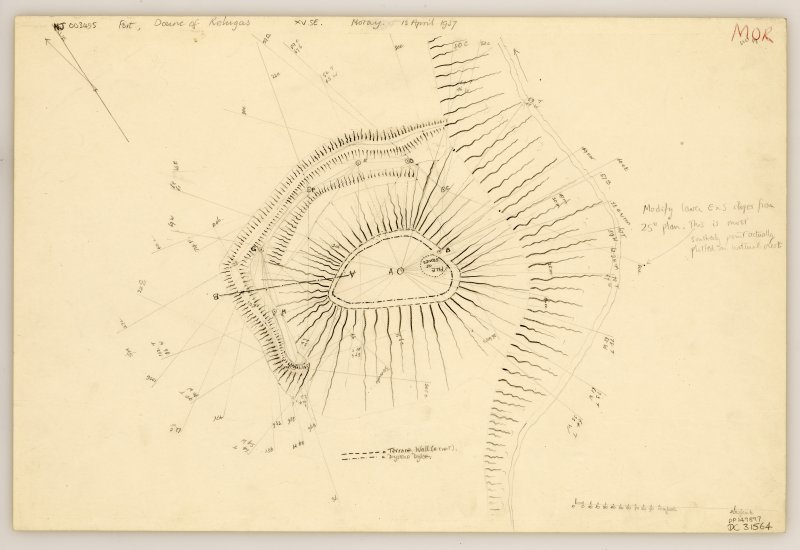

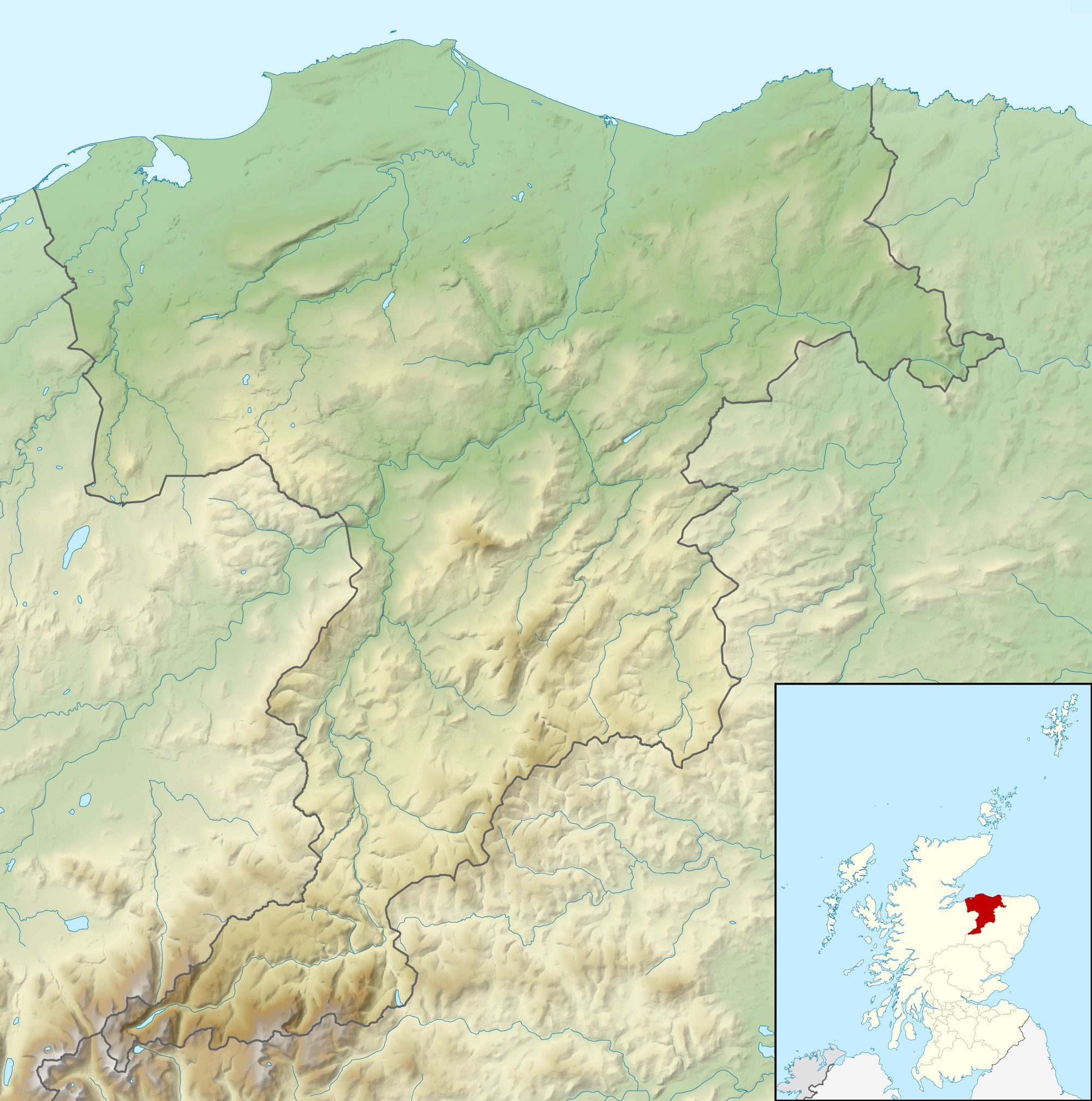
- Location within Moray
- 57.5251°N 3.6648°W
- Type: Hill fort
- Periods: Iron Age, Pictish

Site notes
- Material: Stone, earth
- Height: 400 feet (120 m) AOD
- Length: 53 metres (174 ft)
- Width: 33 metres (108 ft)

Designations

Inventory of Gardens and Designed Landscapes in Scotland
- Official name: Relugas
- Designated: 30 March 2005
- Reference no.: GDL00325

The Doune of Relugas (/rɪˈluːɡəs/) is a hill fort located 9.25 kilometres (5.75 mi) south south west of Forres in Moray, Scotland. It is situated on a rocky knoll rising to approximately 400 feet (120 m) above ordnance datum and forming the south east part of the promontory at the confluence of the River Findhorn and the River Divie. The site commands an uninterrupted view of the valley of the Findhorn as far as Culbin Sands, 9 miles to the north on the shore of the Moray Firth.

The hill fort was occupied from the 1st millennium BC through to the late 1st millennium AD. At its heart is a timber-laced rampart enclosing an area measuring 53 metres (174 ft) by 33 metres (108 ft). The enclosure is oval-shaped and has a gap to the east which may represent its entrance. Although there was no need for further defences to the east and south, there is an outer earthen rampart and ditch across the neck of the promontory to the north and west. This takes the form of a curved ditch 5.5 metres (18 ft) wide and 2.0 metres (6.6 ft) deep, behind which the rampart rises 5.5 metres (18 ft) wide and 1.5 metres (4.9 ft) high.

Stones from the rampart show evidence of vitrification, suggesting that the fort was burned at some point in its history. Other similarly sized vitrified forts within the area include Dun Evan, Dun Finlay and Dun Davie.

During the 19th century the remains of the Doune were incorporated as features into the designed picturesque landscape of the Relugas estate by the antiquarian and author Thomas Dick Lauder.
