= Stella Maris Church, Montevideo =

Church in Montevideo, Uruguay

Coordinates: 34°53′17.6″S 56°3′23.9″W

Parroquia Stella Maris
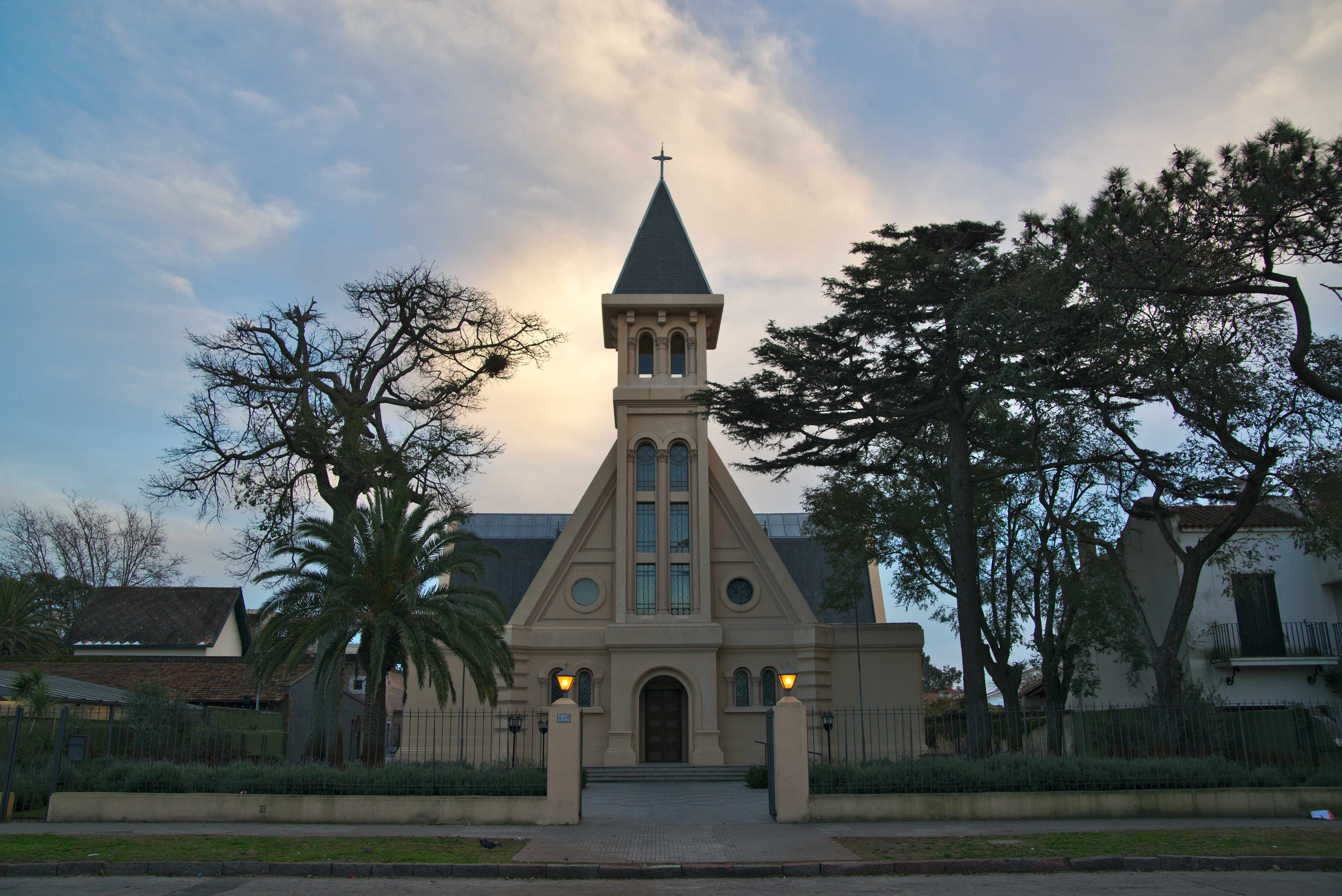
- Parroquia Stella Maris en 2013.

Religion
- Affiliation: Roman Catholic
- Ecclesiastical or organisational status: Parish church
- Patron: Stella Maris
- Year consecrated: 1918

Location
- Location: Gabriel Otero 6489; Montevideo, Uruguay
- Interactive map of Parroquia Stella Maris

Architecture
- Architect: Rafael Ruano
- Type: Church

The Stella Maris Church (Spanish: Iglesia Stella Maris) is a Roman Catholic parish church in the neighbourhood of Carrasco, Montevideo, Uruguay.

The edifice was built in 1918, designed by architect Rafael Ruano. It is dedicated to Our Lady, Star of the Sea, in allusion to the fact that Carrasco was a seaside resort when it was established at the beginning of the 20th century.

The parish was established on 24 February 1934.

Several years ago a wooden image of a Christ Pantocrator was added to the main altar.

In the front yard can be seen an image of the Virgin of the Thirty-Three, patron saint of Uruguay.
