= List of historic sites in Scotland =

There are thousands of historic sites and attractions in Scotland. These include Neolithic Standing stones and Stone Circles, Bronze Age settlements, Iron Age Brochs and Crannogs, Pictish stones, Roman forts and camps, Viking settlements, Mediaeval castles, and early Christian settlements. Scotland also played an important role in the development of the modern world, and there are many industrial heritage sites and museums. A few of the best known are listed below:

== Sites and monuments ==
=== Neolithic sites ===
- Callanish, Lewis
- Corrimony, Glen Urquhart (Glenurquhart)
- Croftmoraig, Perthshire
- Kilmartin Glen, Argyll
- Machrie Moor, Arran
- Maeshowe, Orkney
- Ring of Brodgar, Orkney
- Skara Brae, Orkney
- Standing Stones of Stenness, Orkney

=== Roman sites ===
- Antonine Wall, Scottish Lowlands
- Trimontium, Scottish Borders

=== Monuments ===
- Wallace Monument, Stirling
- National Monument, Edinburgh
- Nelson Monument, Edinburgh
- Scott Monument, Edinburgh

=== Historic sites and battles ===
- Stirling Bridge, 1297
- Bannockburn 1314
- Killiecrankie, 1689
- Glenfinnan, (Raising of Standard in 1745, see Jacobitism)
- Culloden, 1746

== See also ==
- History of Scotland
- Tourism in Scotland.
