= Lists of listed buildings in Scotland =

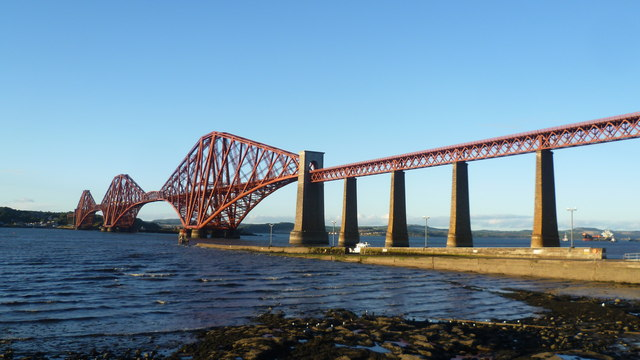
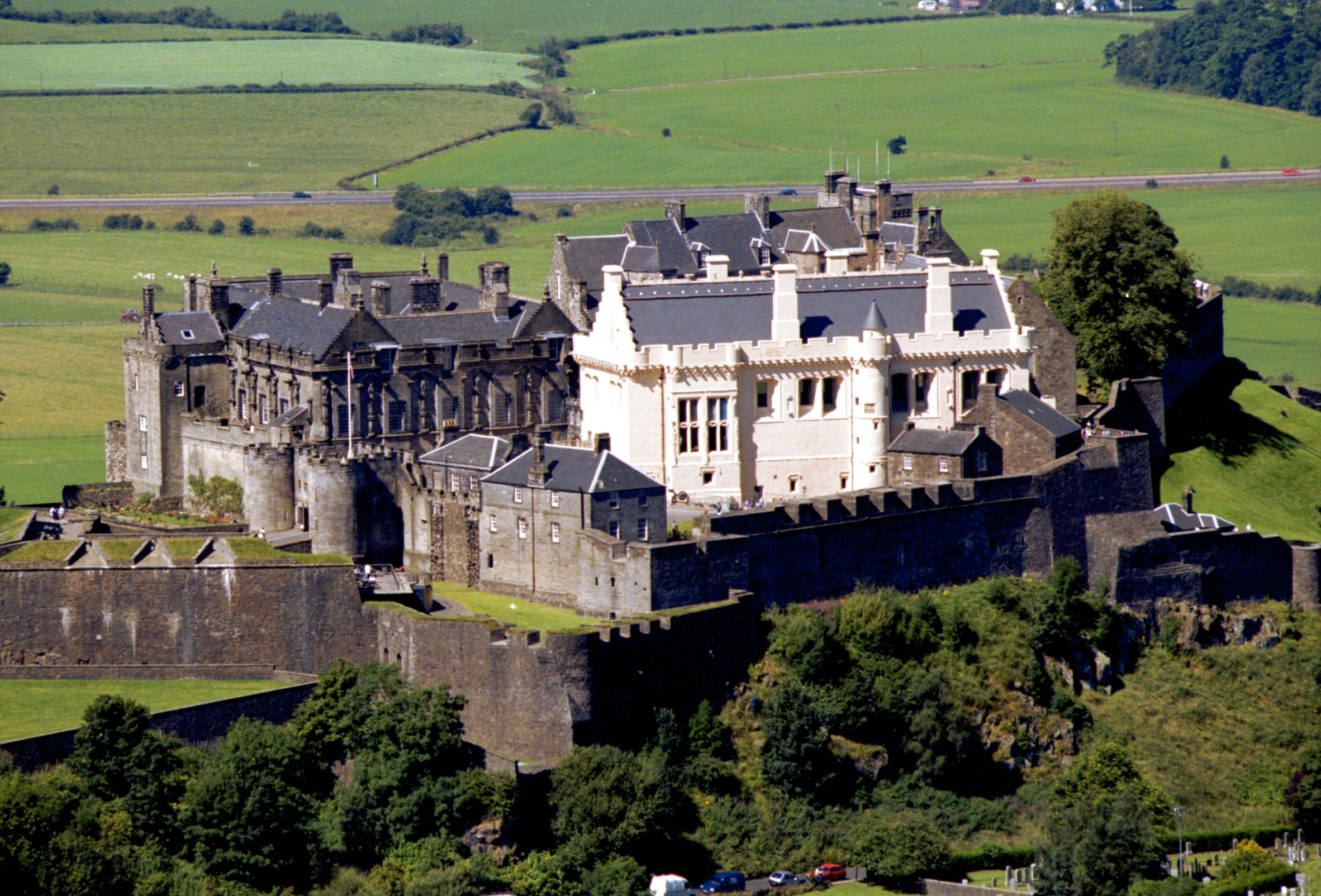
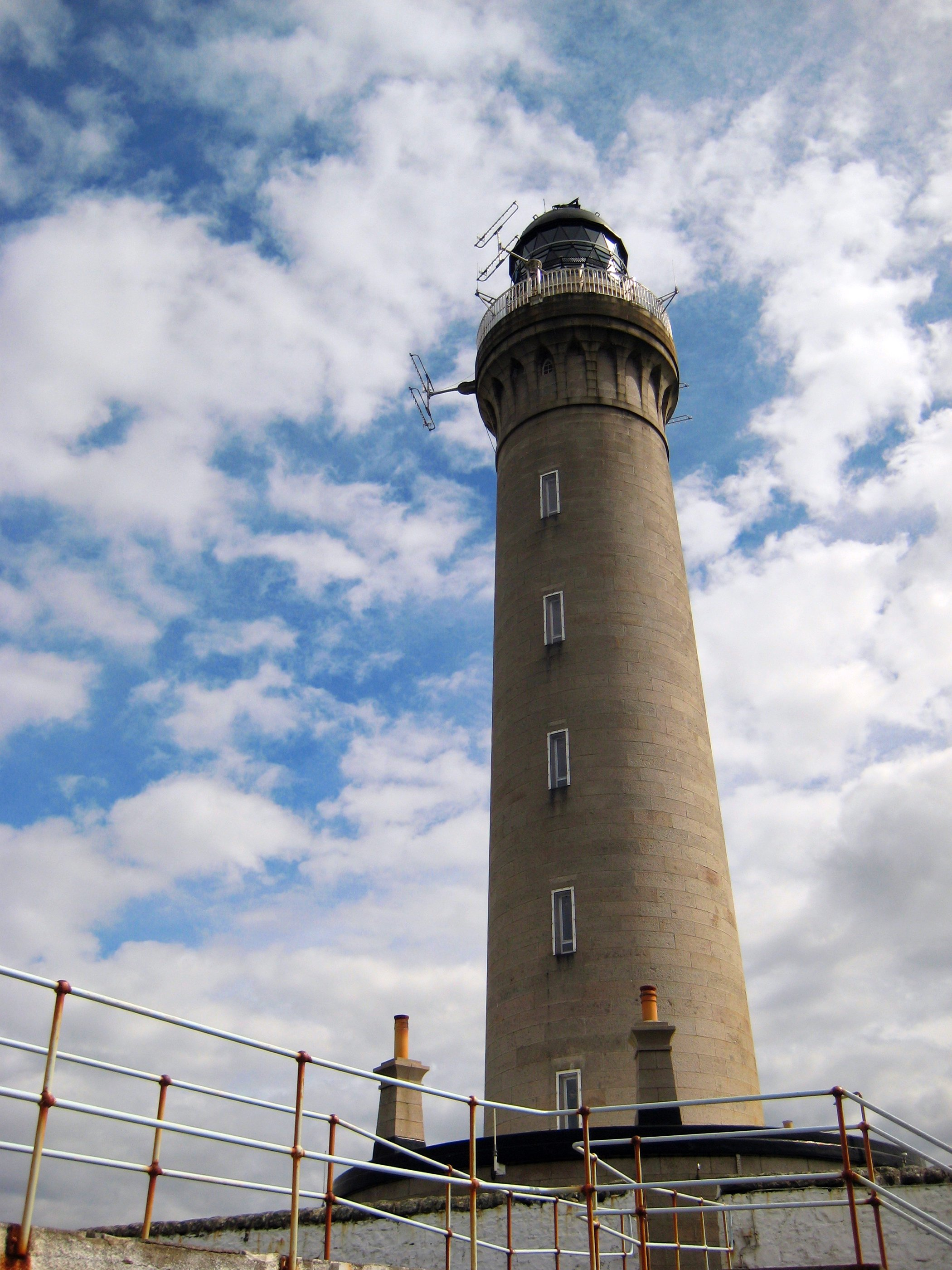
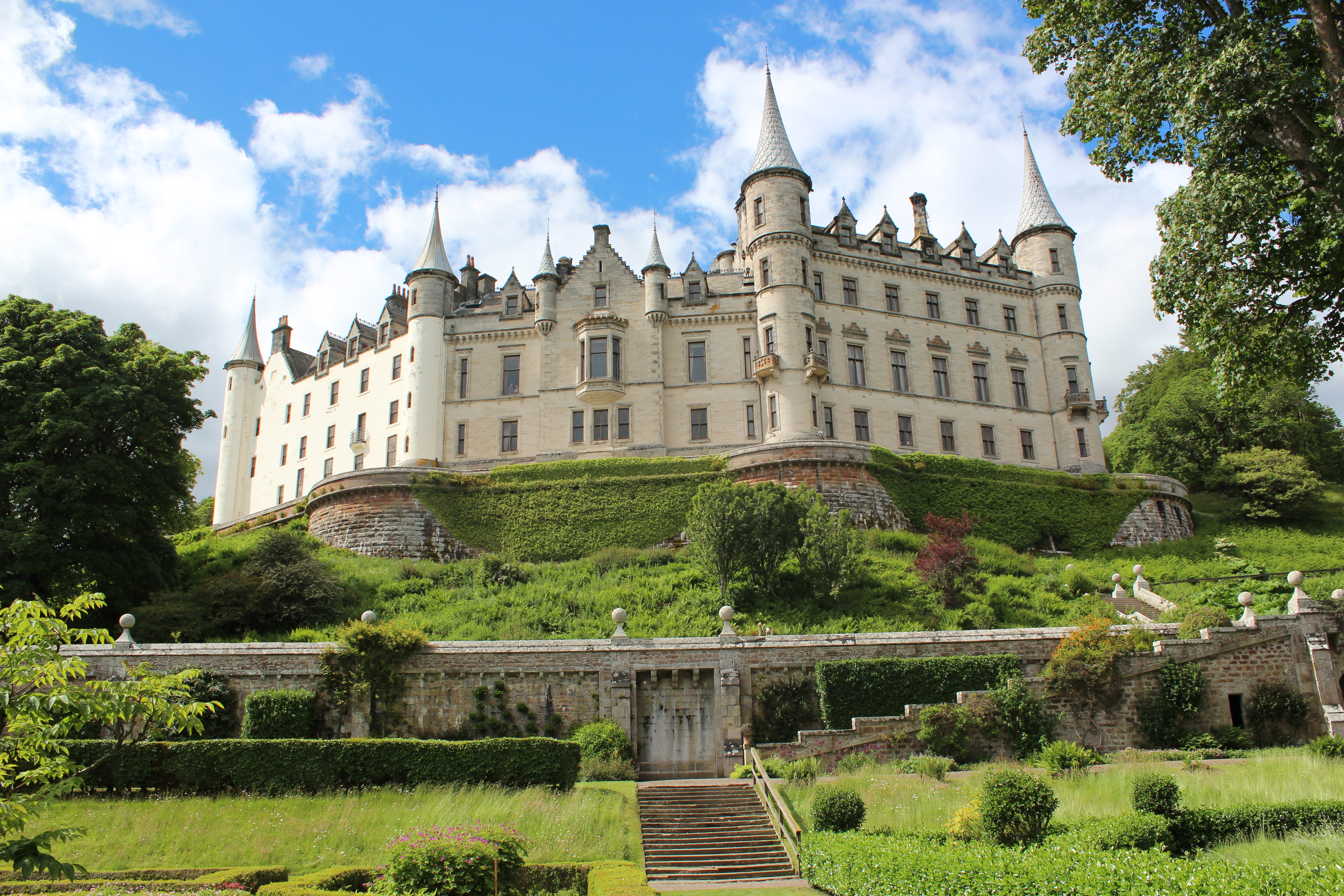
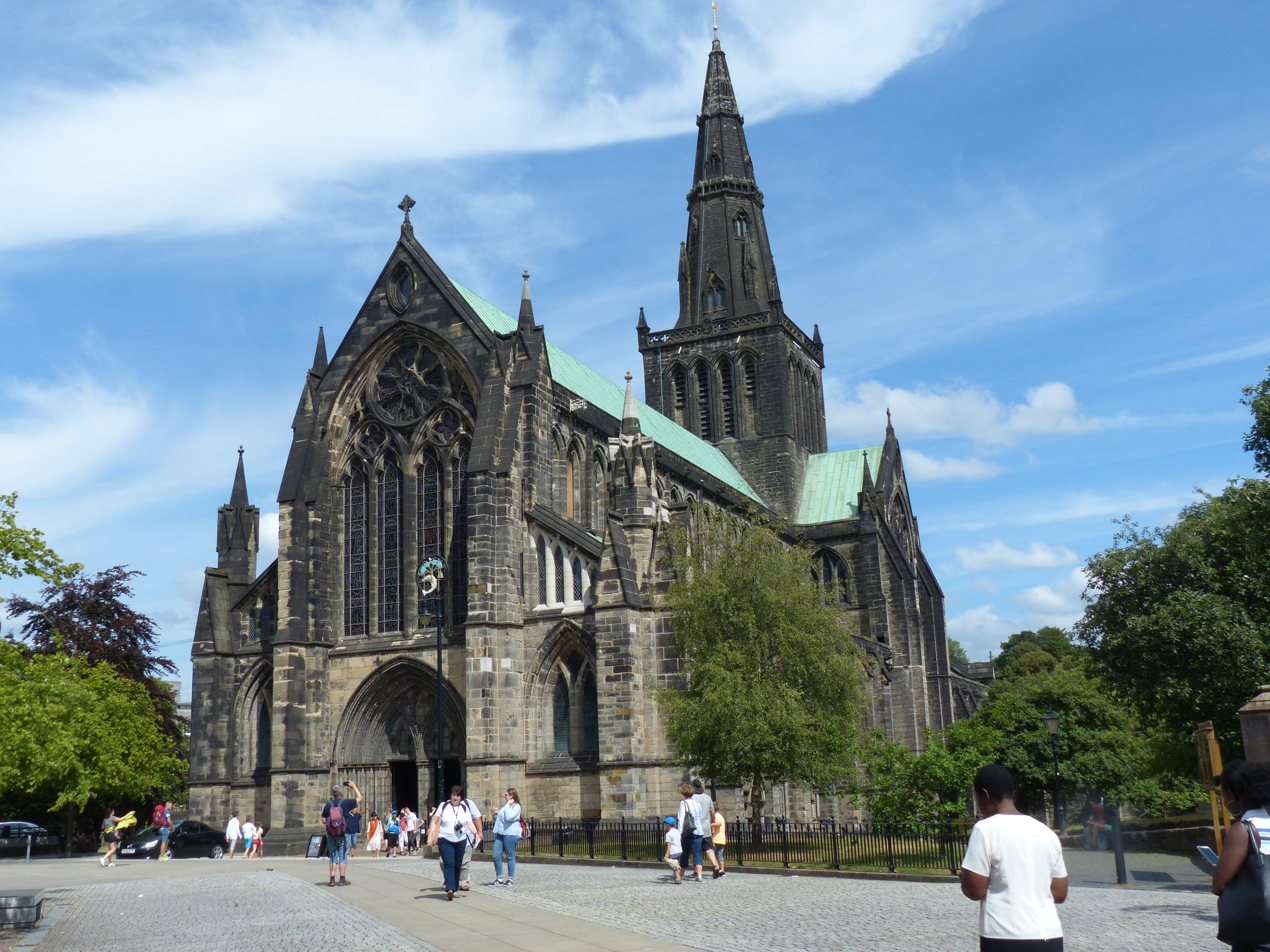
- From top, left to right: Forth Bridge
- Stirling Castle
- Ardnamurchan Lighthouse
- Dunrobin Castle
- Glasgow Cathedral

This is a list of listed buildings in Scotland. The list is split out by council area.

- List of listed buildings in Aberdeen
- List of listed buildings in Aberdeenshire
- List of listed buildings in Angus
- List of listed buildings in Argyll and Bute
- List of listed buildings in Clackmannanshire
- List of listed buildings in Dumfries and Galloway
- List of listed buildings in Dundee
- List of listed buildings in East Ayrshire
- List of listed buildings in East Dunbartonshire
- List of listed buildings in East Lothian
- List of listed buildings in East Renfrewshire
- List of listed buildings in Edinburgh
- List of listed buildings in Falkirk (council area)
- List of listed buildings in Fife
- List of listed buildings in Glasgow
- List of listed buildings in Highland
- List of listed buildings in Inverclyde
- List of listed buildings in Midlothian
- List of listed buildings in Moray
- List of listed buildings in North Ayrshire
- List of listed buildings in North Lanarkshire
- List of listed buildings in Orkney Islands
- List of listed buildings in the Outer Hebrides
- List of listed buildings in Perth and Kinross
- List of listed buildings in Renfrewshire
- List of listed buildings in Scottish Borders
- List of listed buildings in Shetland Islands
- List of listed buildings in South Ayrshire
- List of listed buildings in South Lanarkshire
- List of listed buildings in Stirling
- List of listed buildings in West Dunbartonshire
- List of listed buildings in West Lothian

== See also ==
- Listed buildings in Scotland, includes a list of lists of Category A listed buildings
- Lists of scheduled monuments in Scotland
