= Belmont Mansion =

Belmont Mansion may refer to:

- Belmont Mansion (Philadelphia), a historic house museum
- Belmont Mansion (Tennessee), listed on the National Register of Historic Places
