= Hotel Carrasco =

Hotel and casino in Montevideo, Uruguay

Coordinates: 34.8905°S 56.0554°W

Carrasco Hotel
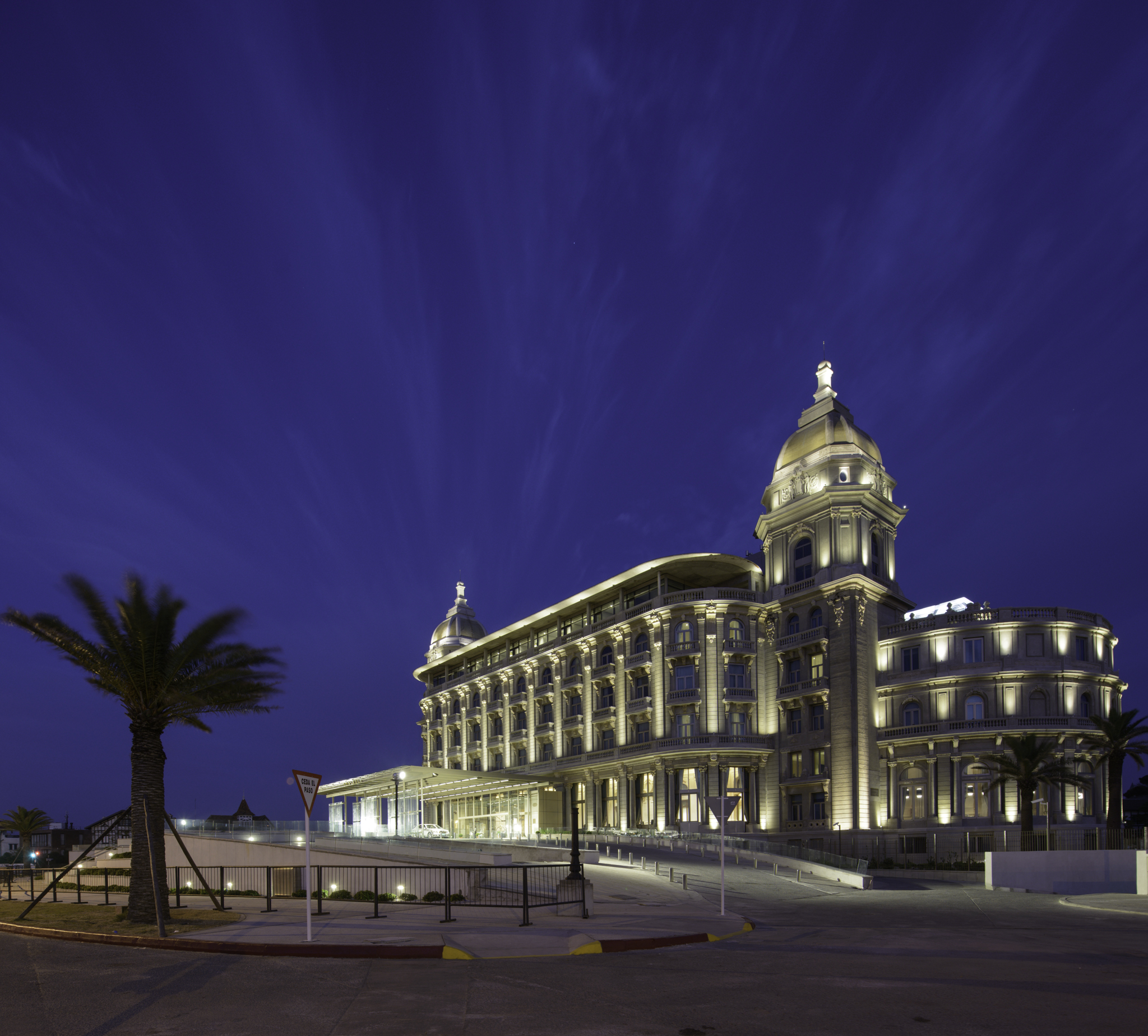
- Interactive map of the Carrasco Hotel area

General information
- Location: Rambla República de México esq. Arocena, Montevideo, Uruguay
- Opening: 1921
- Owner: Carrasco Nobile S. A.
- Management: Sofitel

Design and construction
- Architects: Gastón Mallet, Jacques Dunant

Website
- Hotel Casino Carrasco

The Hotel Casino Carrasco is a historic five star hotel and casino in Montevideo, Uruguay. It currently operates as the Hotel Sofitel Montevideo Casino Carrasco and Spa.

== History ==
The idea for the building began with the formation of a corporation called "Balneario Carrasco", created by Alfredo Arocena with the aim of building a hotel in the then seaside resort of Carrasco. This company was in charge of summoning the landscaper Carlos Thays, to design and convert the entire area into a wonderful garden neighborhood, and then begin the construction of the Hotel Carrasco, named in honor of the first owner of the lands, Sebastián Carrasco.

The construction of the hotel began in 1912, under the leadership and projection of the architects Gastón Mallet and the Swiss Jacques Dunant.

The outbreak of the World War I forced the suspension of construction works for nine years. Later, the Municipality of Montevideo bought the land and the monumental unfinished building, to continue the works and finally inaugurate them, on January 29, 1921. It soon became a landmark of luxury for tourists visiting the city, and many lodged many famous personalities, such as Albert Einstein (1925) and Federico García Lorca (1934).

In 1975 it was declared a National Historical Heritage. In 1997 it closed its doors. Renovation work began in 2009 by the company Carrasco Nobile Sociedad Anónima, and culminated in 2013. Currently the hotel is managed by Sofitel. It formally reopened its doors on March 7, 2013. According to El País, the opening of this building brings with it a whole revolution in the neighbourhood of Carrasco, with many real estate and business investments. In addition, Rostand Street and the adjoining square became one of the most popular pedestrian zones in the city.

== Overview ==
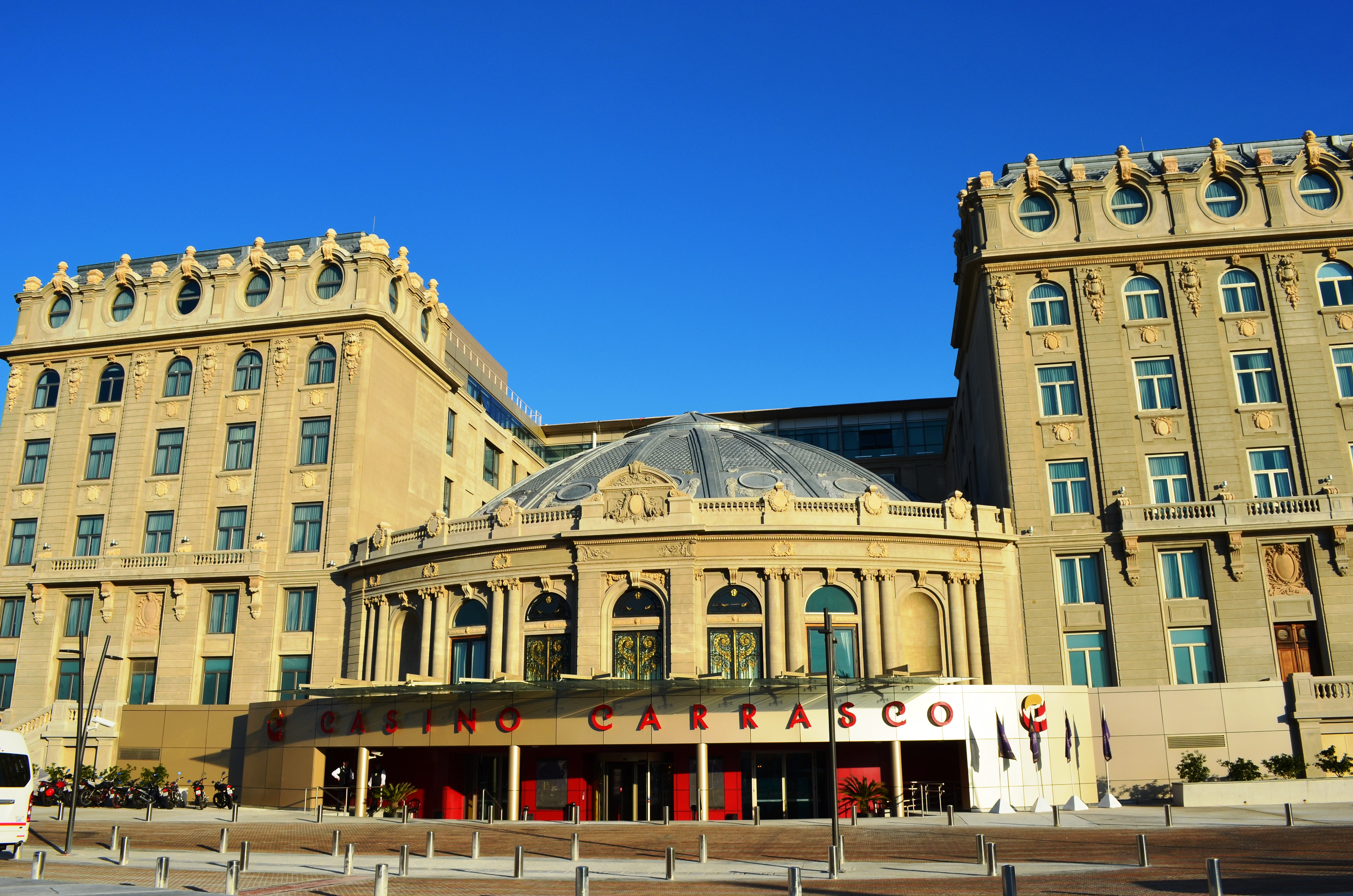
Rear entrance and access to the casino

Located on the Rambla of Montevideo, the hotel stands as the center of the urban plan designed for the barrio Carrasco, in the first decades of the 20th century, by the French landscape architects Charles Thays and Edouard André.

Its architectural style is eclectic-historicist with a predominance of neoclassical and baroque and inspired by European palace hotels. It currently has 116 rooms (including 22 Suites), Thays Lounge Bar, 1921 Restaurant, spa and various spaces for events. In the basement there is a casino.
