= Belmont House, Shetland =

Belmont House
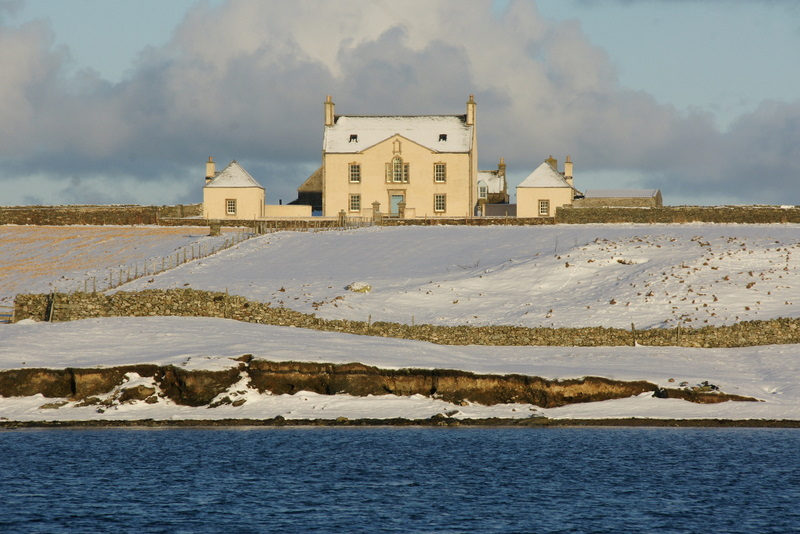
- Belmont House

- Location in the Shetland Islands
- 60.6876°N 0.9673°W

Listed Building – Category A
- Designated: 13 August 1971
- Reference no.: LB17474

Inventory of Gardens and Designed Landscapes in Scotland
- Official name: Belmont House
- Criteria: Work of Art, Architectural
- Designated: 31 March 2003
- Reference no.: GDL00054

Belmont House (Shaetlan pronunciation: [ˌbɛɫmənt ˈhuːs] BEL-mənt-HOOSS) is a neo-classical Georgian country house estate on the island of Unst, the most northerly of the Shetland Islands, United Kingdom. It was constructed in 1775 by Shetland landowner Thomas Mouat of Garth who was a local Shetlander. The Estate has been described as "possibly the most ambitious, least-altered classical mansion in the Northern Isles." The house was restored from a derelict state between 1996 and 2010 by the community and local interest groups and Trust.

Belmont House is protected as a category A listed building, and the grounds are included on the Inventory of Gardens and Designed Landscapes in Scotland, the national listing of significant gardens.

== Gardens ==
Walled gardens are laid out to the south of the house. These were originally restored by The Belmont Trust with walls restored and trees and shrubs planted and miantained and added to by the owners (Wilsons) with British species of Roses and Fruit Trees.

== History ==
Belmont was built in 1775, with the farm square to the rear complete by 1790; together they form "miniature Palladian classical groups with flanking pavilion wings". Surrounding enclosures including garden grounds form a regular layout running down to the sea. The house and adjacent farm square are designated category A, and the grounds are included on the Inventory of Gardens and Designed Landscapes in Scotland.

The house was built for Thomas Mouat, whose father William was laird of the Garth estate in Shetland. Thomas Mouat visited Lothian, around Edinburgh, to gather ideas on contemporary architecture, and may have been influenced by Hopetoun House.

In the early 19th century, the east wing was added to the house (now demolished), but it has otherwise remained unaltered. The Mouat family continued to occupy the house until the mid-20th century. It was then sold and became derelict. From 1996 and over the following 15 years works were carried out, largely by local craftsmen, to bring the building back into use. The property was sold in 2022 to the Wilson family who now use the House as their home and Bed and Breakfast retreat for visitors to the island of Unst. The original interiors are described by Historic Scotland as "a particularly remarkable survival."
