= Dun Evan =

Hill fort in the Highland area of Scotland

- Doune of Cawdor
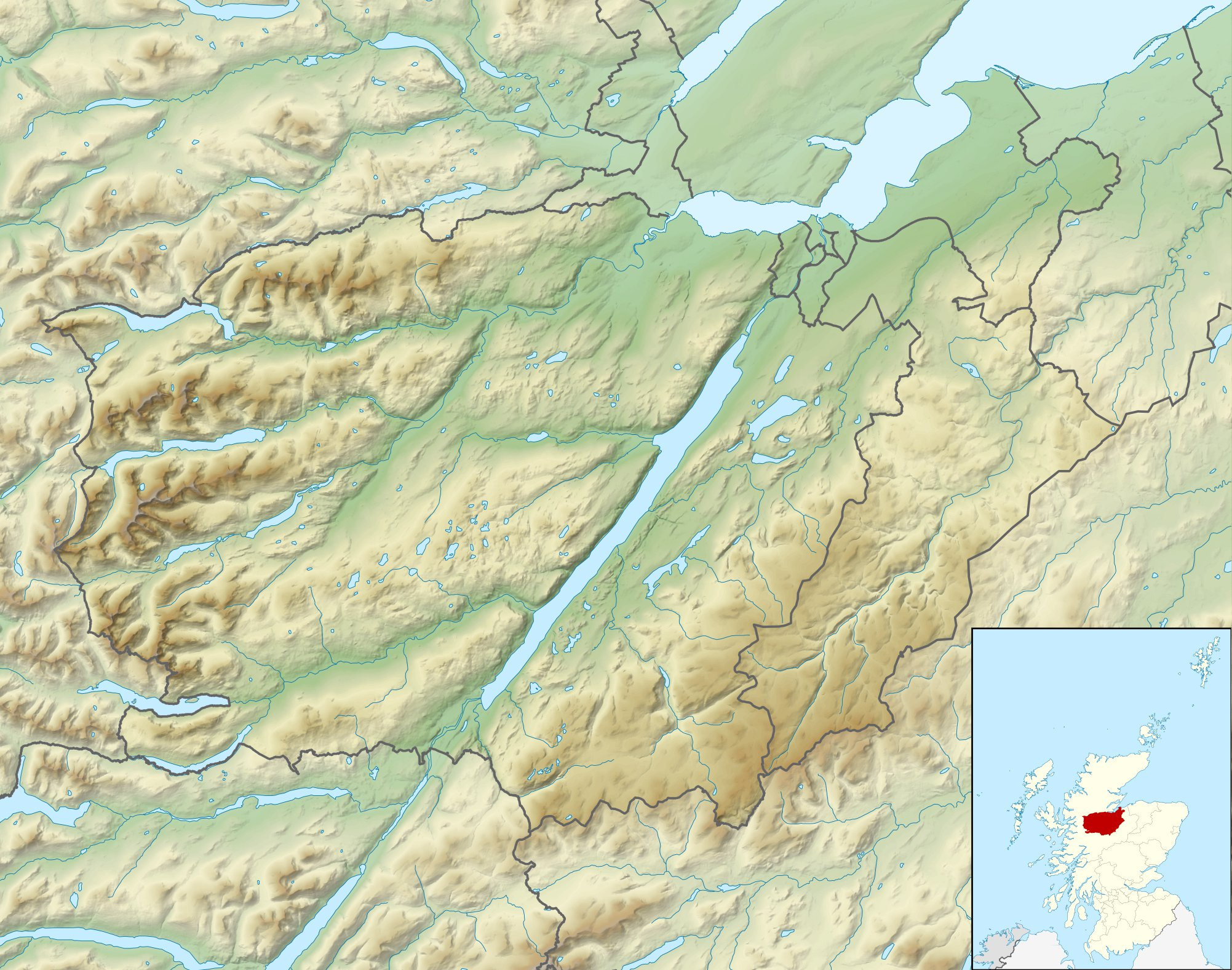
- Location within Inverness area
- 57.5030°N 3.9581°W
- Type: Hill fort

Site notes
- Material: Stone, earth
- Height: 678 feet (207 m) AOD
- Length: 58 metres (190 ft)
- Width: 25 metres (82 ft)

Dun Evan or the Doune of Cawdor is a hill fort located 2.5 kilometres (1.6 mi) south west of Cawdor in the Highland area of Scotland. It is situated on a rocky hill that rises to 678 feet (207 m) above ordnance datum between the valleys of the River Nairn and its tributary the Allt Dearg. The site has a wide view in all directions, extending to the mouth of the River Nairn at the town of Nairn, 7 miles to the north east on the shore of the Moray Firth. Dun Evan is scheduled by Historic Environment Scotland as a site of national importance.

A ruined wall surrounds the summit of the hill, enclosing an area measuring 58 metres (190 ft) by 25 metres (82 ft), surviving to an average internal height of 0.4 metres (1.3 ft) and spread to a width of up to 10 metres (33 ft). Facing stones and traces of vitrification were recorded from this wall in 1963 and a dip in the wall in the north east suggests it was the entrance to the enclosure. A wall enclosing a smaller area of the summit marks a second phase of the defences, probably built with stones removed from the fortifications of the earlier phase. The small size of the stones of the inner walls of the fort suggest that they were timber-laced. Within the fort a circular depression measuring approximately 3.5 metres (11 ft) in diameter and 0.6 metres (2.0 ft) deep has been interpreted as a well or a cistern.

The fort is surrounded by a series of outer defences further down the flanks of the rock, including a 180 feet (55 m) arc of ruined walling and earthworks to the south west, and a similar 130 feet (40 m) arc to the north east. Within the north east tip of this second arc is a further defensive wall whose surviving height was measured in 1957 as up to 14 feet (4.3 m), and which extended about 60 feet (18 m) back to the southern apex of the rock This was connected to the outer arc by two parallel radial stretches of wall about 25 feet (7.6 m) to 35 feet (11 m) apart, which together formed a rectilinear plan which may represent a building or reinforcing cross-walls, but appear to have been built on a larger scale than the rest of the defences.
