= Powrie Castle =

Castle in Dundee, Scotland

Coordinates: 56°29′58″N 2°56′29″W

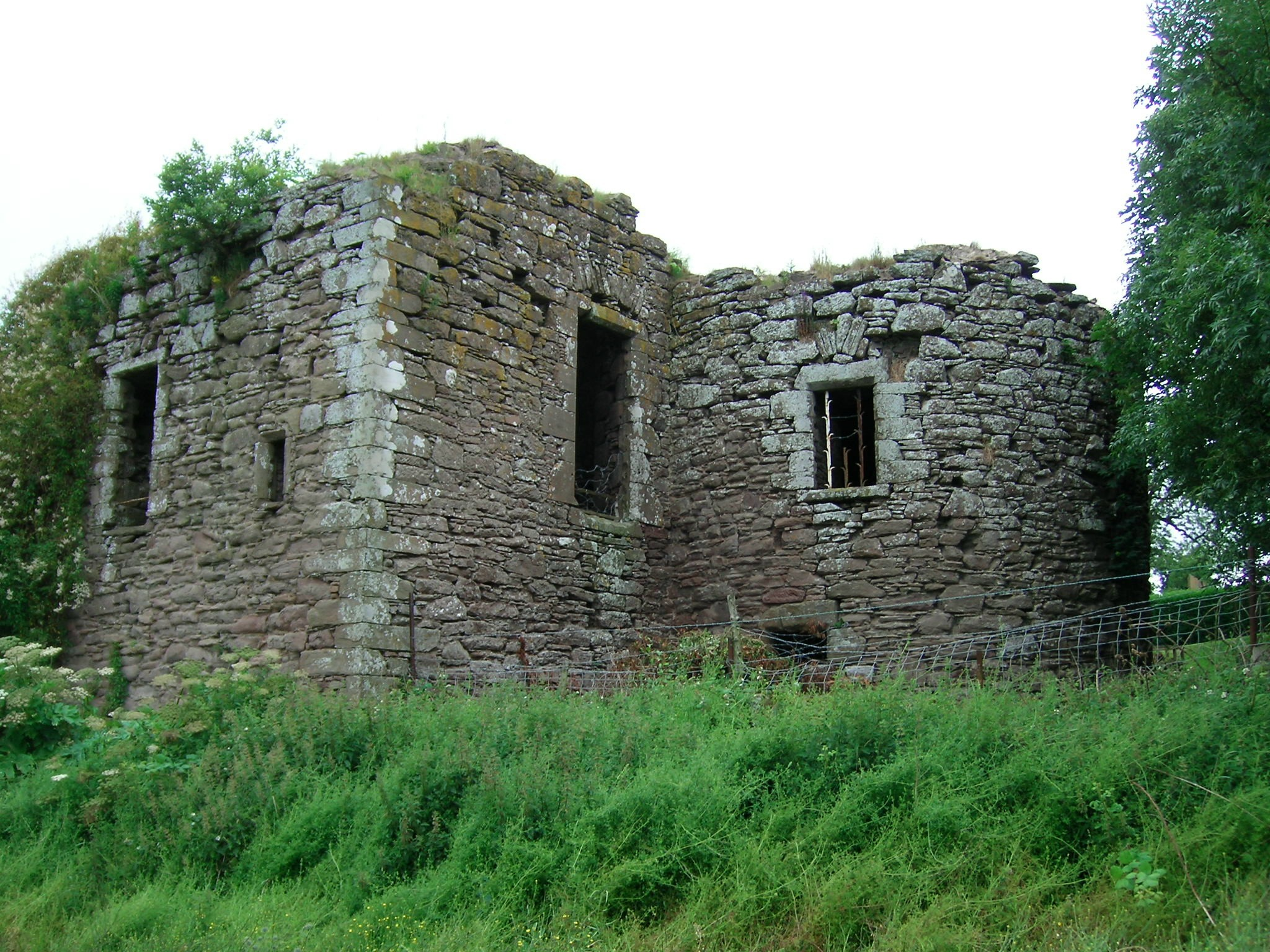
- South wing of Powrie Castle viewed from the south east
- Interactive map of the Powrie Castle area

General information
- Location: Dundee, Scotland

Technical details
- Material: Stone

Listed Building – Category A
- Official name: Powrie, Powrie Castle
- Designated: 10 June 1971
- Reference no.: LB19019

Scheduled monument
- Official name: Powrie Castle, Powrie
- Designated: 28 July 1970
- Reference no.: SM2871

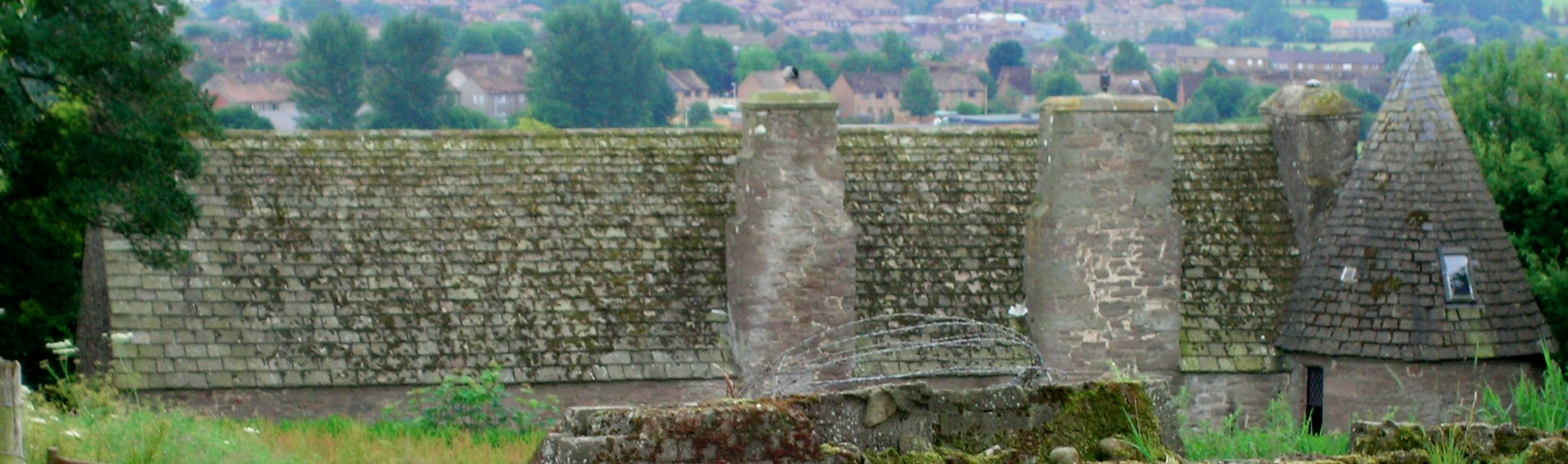
Powrie Castle north wing viewed from a road to the north

Powrie Castle is a ruined 16th-century castle located in the north of Dundee, Scotland. It was designated as a scheduled monument in 1970. The early 17th-century north range of the castle is now a separate fortified house and has been converted into a private residence. It itself is a Category A listed building.

== History ==
Originally known as Wester Powrie, the estate was purchased by Thomas Fothringham in 1412 who built a castle of which nothing is known. That structure was destroyed by the Scrymgeours in 1492 and the current castle, built of pink and buff sandstone rubble, probably replaced it in the 16th century. It may have been damaged as part of the Rough Wooing; if so it was repaired. It was after this incident that the castle was enlarged with east and north domestic ranges. Little survives of the east range, although it was known as "Lady Kinneard's quarters" or "the ladies quarter". The north range was built in 1604 by the Thomas Fothringham who married Barbara Scott in 1593. With the disappearance of the east range and the western boundary wall, the castle now appears as two separate buildings forming a courtyard. The family appears to have remained in the main building until at least 1684.

A National Trust for Scotland competition was later held to design a plan to restore the north range. This was won by Gillian Strickland who was awarded ownership of the castle as a result. It was adapted as a private residence in 1978–1981 by architect D. C. Leslie.

== Description ==
The final layout of the main castle was as a two-storey rectangular Z-plan structure with round towers at the north east and south west corners. The western part of the building has collapsed. The north wing was built in a more renaissance style with a vaulted ground floor and a small round tower at the north west corner.

== Bibliography ==
- A Chronicle of The City's Office Bearers, Chambers, Regalia, Castles & Twin Cities (PDF). Dundee City Council. Archived from the original (PDF) on 23 July 2006.
- MacGibbon, David & Ross, Thomas (1889). The Castellated and Domestic Architecture of Scotland, from the Twelfth to the Eighteenth century. Vol. 4. Edinburgh: David Douglas.
