= McCord Centre for Landscape =

Research centre

Coordinates: 54°58′47″N 01°36′58″W

The McCord Centre for Landscape is an interdisciplinary research centre based at Newcastle University, directed by Sam Turner. It is named after Norman McCord, emeritus professor of history at Newcastle University, a pioneer of aerial photography in north-east England.

Research in the McCord Centre covers landscapes in the broadest sense, from the physical environment to intangible heritage, and includes archaeologists, historians, geographers, geoscientists and landscape architects. Although the McCord Centre is based in Newcastle, it has members around the world. The Centre promotes interdisciplinary approaches to understanding the complex relationships that create landscapes from early prehistory to present.

The centre undertakes desk based assessments and surveys for bodies such as English Heritage, and Durham County, academic research, and has hosted several major international conferences.
