= Belmont House (Montevideo) =

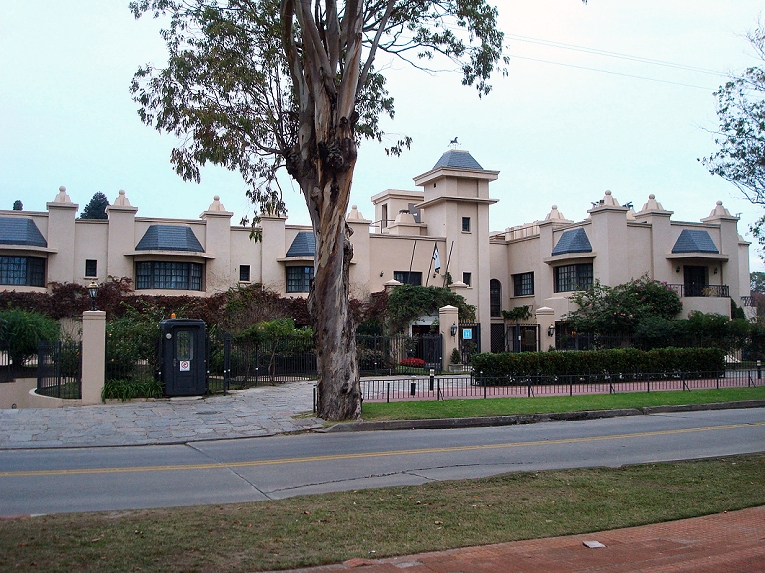

- Location within Montevideo

General information
- Location: Avenida Rivera in Carrasco, Montevideo, Uruguay.
- Coordinates: 34°53′16″S 56°3′42″W
- Opening: 1995

Other information
- Number of rooms: 24

Belmont House is a boutique hotel, located on the Avenida Rivera in Carrasco, Montevideo, Uruguay. It is set amidst gardens, has 24 rooms and suites and is served by the Restaurant Allegro. Belmont House retains the feel of an aristocratic home in Montevideo, with its lavish furnishings, and rooms with rich and colorful linens, two and four posters beds, marble bathrooms and jacuzzis.
