= Inventory of Gardens and Designed Landscapes in Scotland =

Listing of gardens

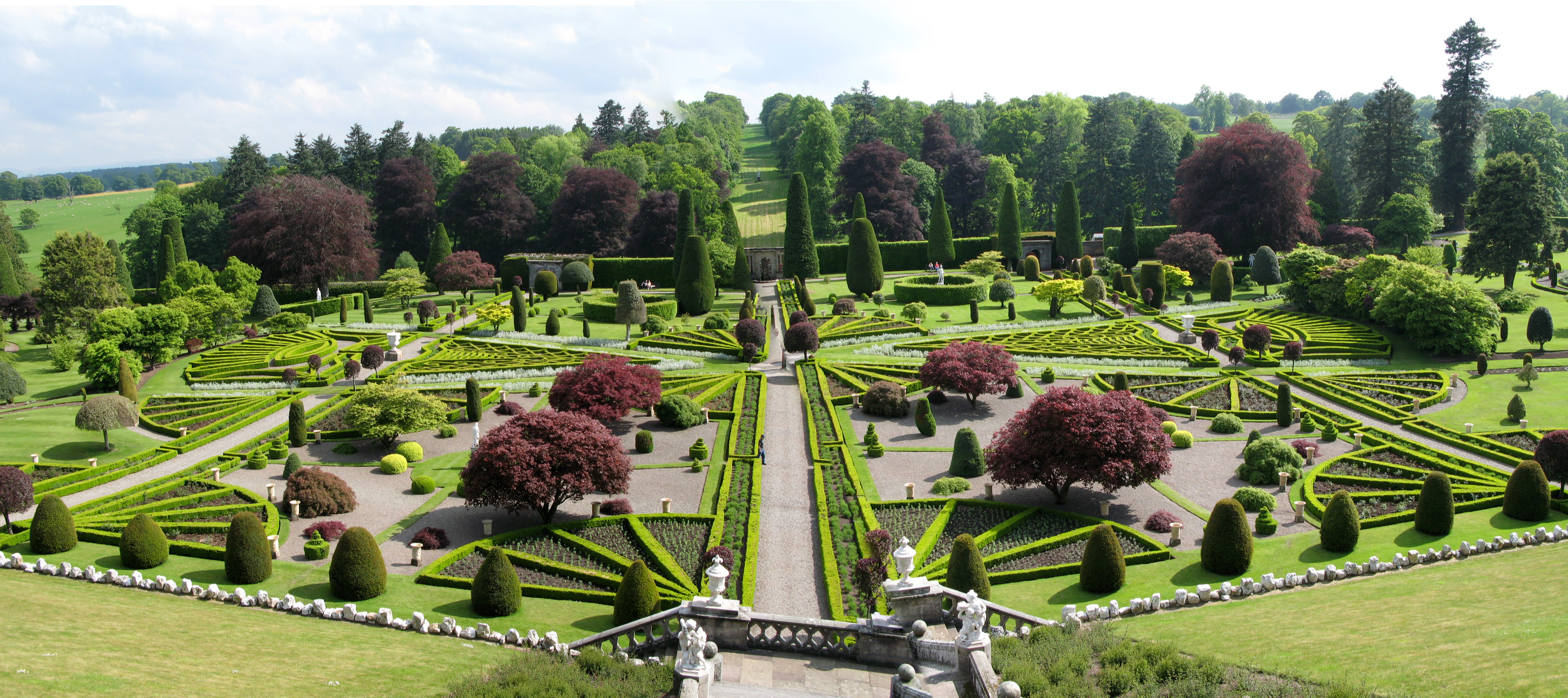
The gardens at Drummond Castle are listed on the Inventory, as "the best example of formal terraced gardens in Scotland", and are assessed as "outstanding" for four of six values

The Inventory of Gardens and Designed Landscapes in Scotland is a listing of gardens and designed landscapes of national artistic and/or historical significance, in Scotland. The Inventory was originally compiled in 1987, although it is a continually evolving list. From 1991 it was maintained by Historic Scotland and Scottish Natural Heritage, and is now updated by a dedicated team within Historic Environment Scotland. As of 2016 the Inventory includes over 300 sites across Scotland.

== Background ==
Unlike listed building status, there is no statutory basis for the Inventory, and inclusion of a site on the Inventory does not offer any legal protection. However, under the Town and Country Planning (Development Management Procedure) (Scotland) Regulations 2013, planning authorities are required to consult Historic Environment Scotland on "development which may affect a historic garden or designed landscape". This is confirmed in Scottish Planning Policy, and the inclusion of a site on the Inventory is a material consideration in planning terms.

== Types of site ==
The majority of the Inventory sites are estate or park landscapes associated with country houses. However, a wide variety of other types of site are included, including cemeteries, urban parks, and small gardens, where these are of historical significance. Examples include Benmore Botanic Garden in Argyll, Duthie Park in Aberdeen, the Balmoral Castle estate in Deeside, and Ian Hamilton Finlay's garden at Little Sparta in Lanarkshire.

== Site selection ==
Sites are selected and graded based on seven value-based criteria. These are:

- value as an individual work of art
- historic value
- horticultural, arboricultural, silvicultural value
- architectural value
- scenic value
- nature conservation value
- archaeological value

Each site is assessed, on a scale of none—little—some—high—outstanding, for each criterion, using guidance set out in the Historic Environment Policy Statement.

== Other parts of the United Kingdom ==
Separate registers of parks, gardens and designed landscapes are maintained in the other countries of the United Kingdom:

- The Register of Historic Parks and Gardens of special historic interest in England is maintained by English Heritage
- The Cadw/ICOMOS Register of Parks and Gardens of Special Historic Interest in Wales is maintained by Cadw
- The Register of Parks, Gardens and Demesnes of Special Historic Interest is maintained by the Northern Ireland Environment Agency

== See also ==
- List of sites on the Inventory of Gardens and Designed Landscapes
