= Christison =

Christison is a surname. Notable people with the surname include:

- Alexander Christison, (1751–1820), Scottish educator and mathematician
- Dan Christison (born 1972), an American mixed martial artist
- David Christison, (1830–1912), Scottish physician, botanist, writer and antiquary
- Kathleen Christison (born 1941), an American political analyst and author
- Philip Christison GBE CB DSO MC (1893–1993), a British military commander of the Second World War
- Robert Christison FRSE FRCSE FRCPE (1797–1882), a Scottish toxicologist and physician, president of the Royal College of Surgeons of Edinburgh
- Robert Christison (pastoralist) (1837–1915), a pastoralist in Australia
- Sir Alexander Christison (1828 – 1918), Scottish army surgeon
- Wenlock Christison, last Quaker to be sentenced to death in Massachusetts
- William Christison (c.1520–1603), Church of Scotland minister

== See also ==
- Christison baronets, a title in the Baronetage of the United Kingdom
