= Robert Christison (disambiguation) =

Robert Christison (1797–1882) was a Scottish toxicologist and physician

Robert Christison may also refer to:

- Robert Christison (pastoralist) (1837–1915), Australian pastoralist
- Sir Robert Alexander Christison, 3rd Baronet (1870–1945) of the Christison baronets

== See also ==
- Christison (surname)
