= John Beddoe =

English ethnologist (1826–1911)

John Beddoe FRS FRAI
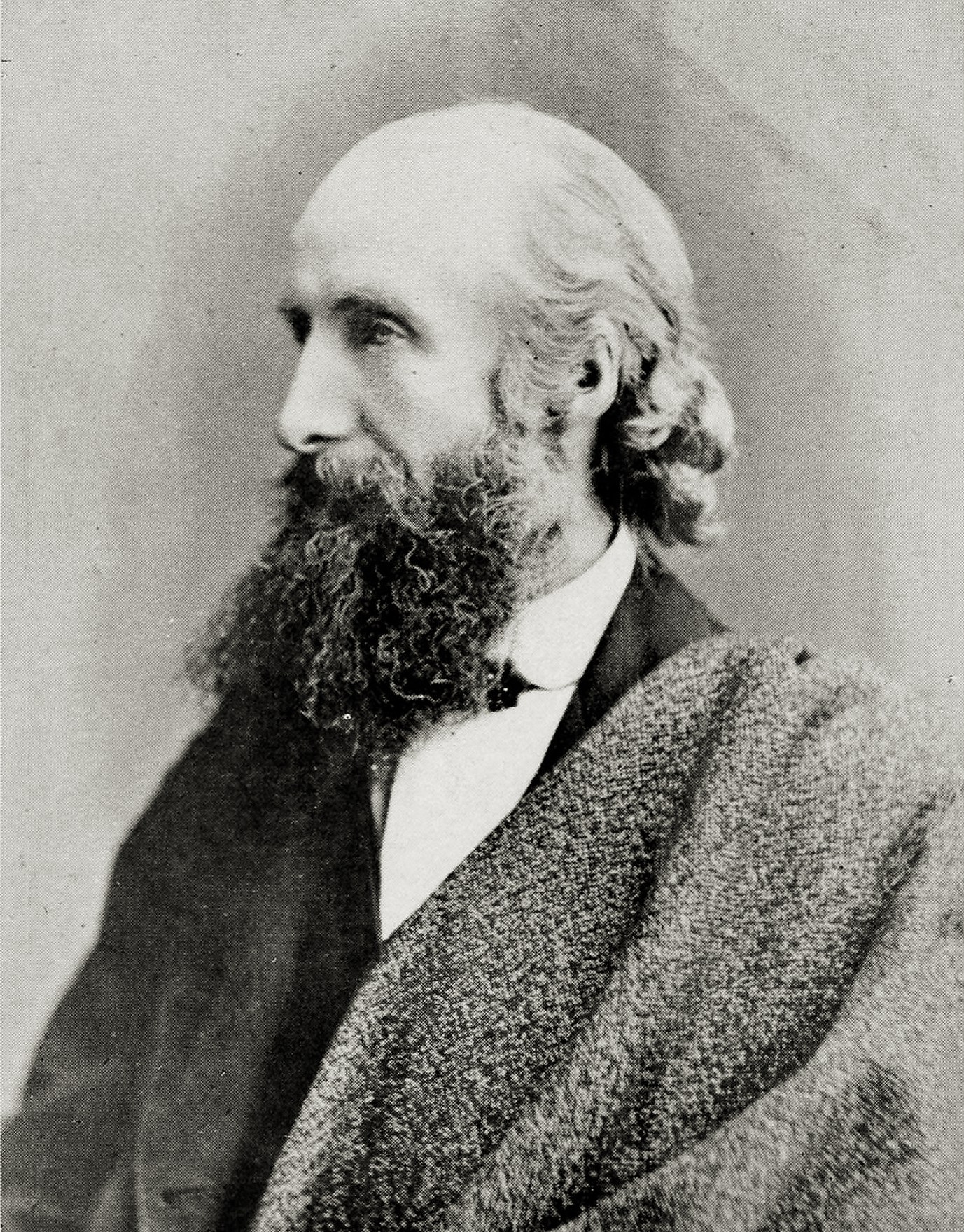
- Born: 21 September 1826; Bewdley, Worcestershire, England
- Died: 19 July 1911 (aged 84)
- Education: University College, London; Edinburgh University
- Occupation: ethnologist

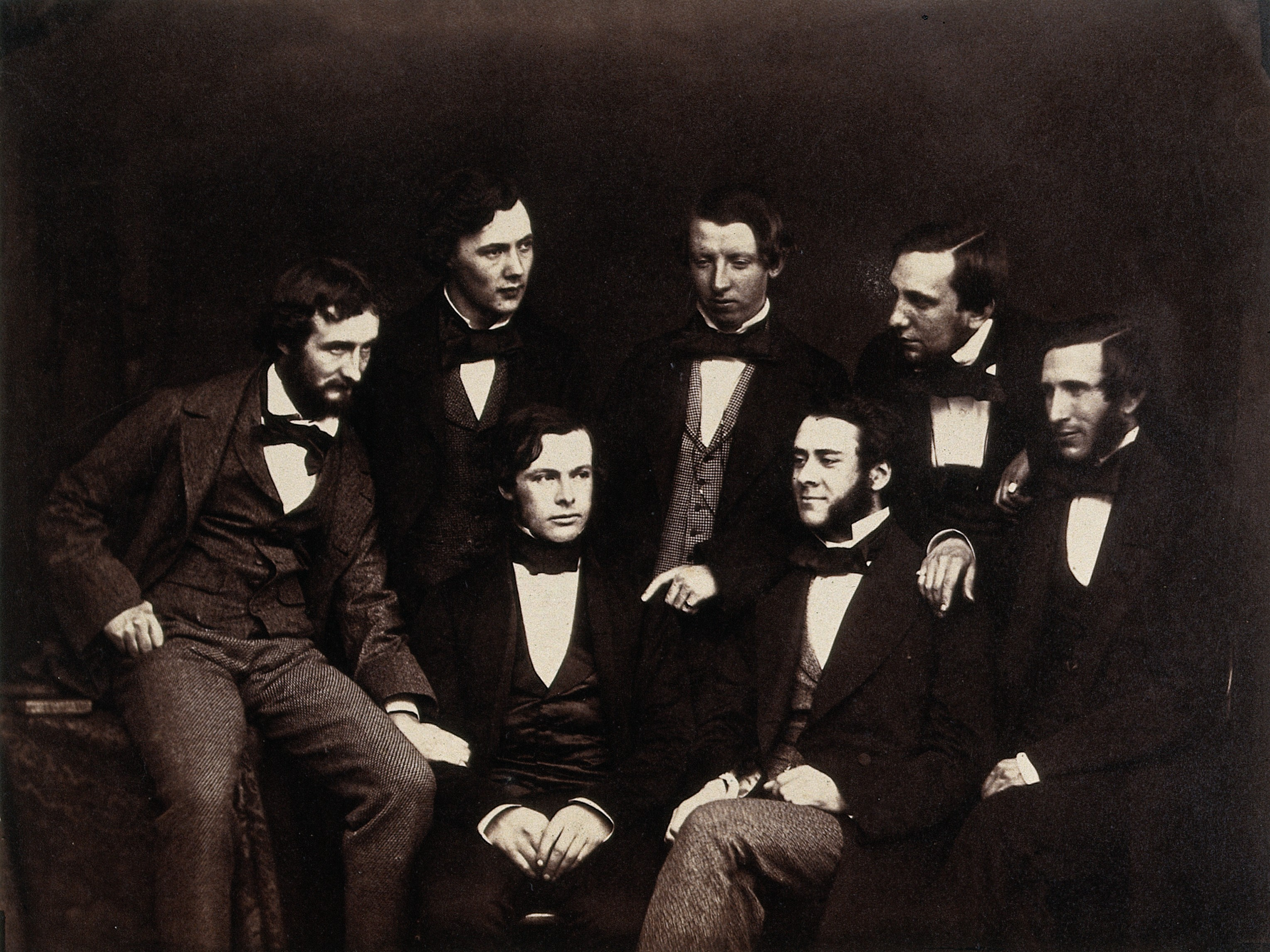
John Beddoe (far left) with other Residents at the Old Royal Infirmary, Edinburgh, including his friends David Christison, Joseph Lister, and Patrick Heron Watson

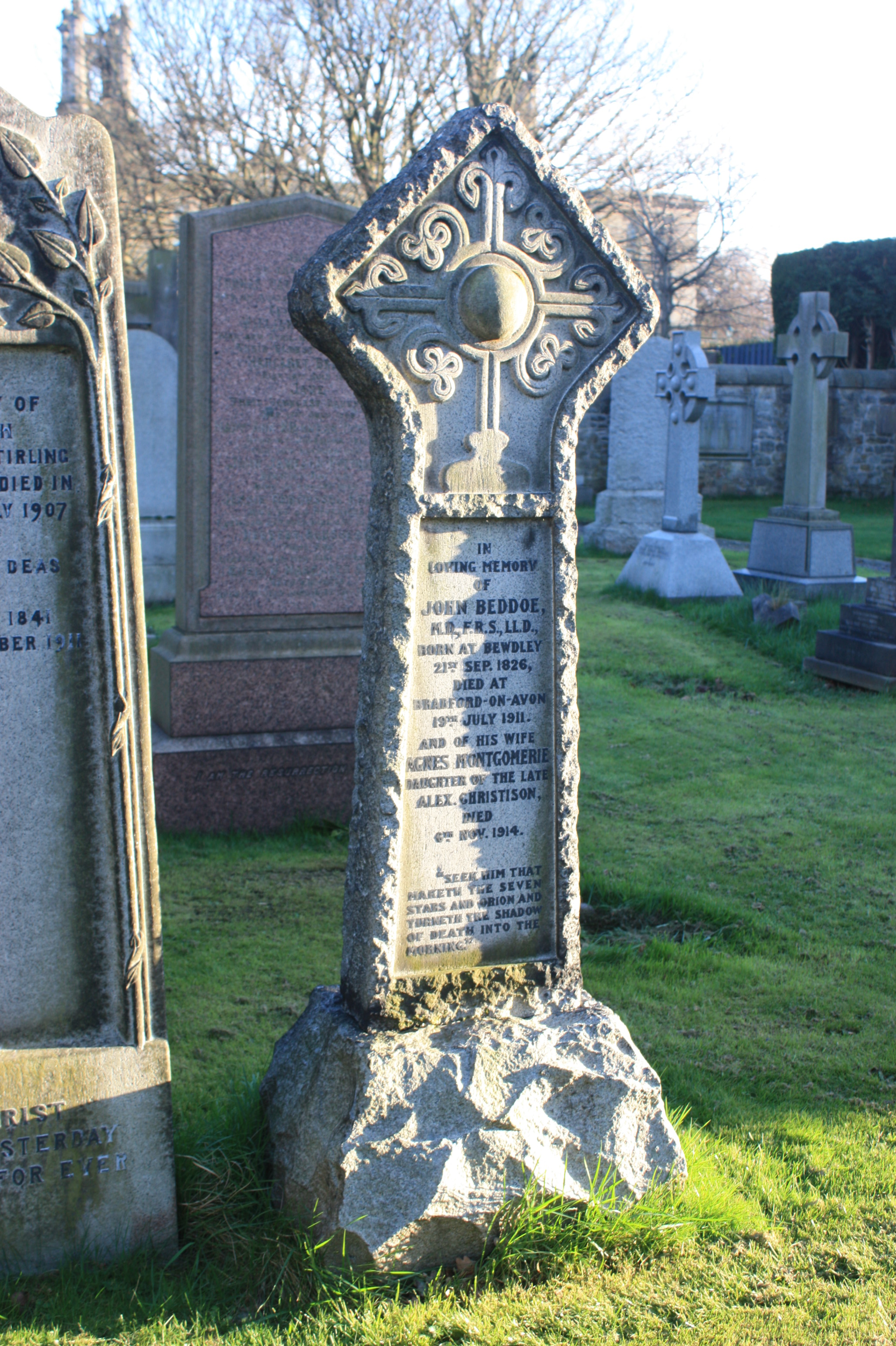
The grave of John Beddoe, Dean Cemetery

John Beddoe FRS FRAI (21 September 1826 – 19 July 1911) was one of the most prominent English ethnologists in Victorian Britain.

== Life ==
Beddoe was born in Bewdley, Worcestershire, and educated at University College, London (BA (London)) and the University of Edinburgh (MD 1853). He served in the Crimean War alongside David Christison and was a physician at Bristol Royal Infirmary from 1862 to 1873. He and his wife Agnes were both friends with Mary Carpenter and they hosted what was said to be the first women's suffrage meeting in 1868. Invitees included a young Annie Leigh Browne. Beddoe retired from practice in Bristol in 1891.

He was elected a Fellow of the Royal Society in 1873. In 1887 he was elected a member of the American Antiquarian Society. He was president of the Anthropological Institute from 1889 to 1891.

He died at Bradford-on-Avon on 19 July 1911. He is buried in the northern section of Dean Cemetery in Edinburgh towards the western end.

== Family ==
In 1858, he married Agnes Montgomerie Cameron (d.1914), granddaughter of Prof Alexander Christison and niece of Robert Christison. She was the sister of his friend Dr David Christison. Together they had a son and a daughter.

== Works ==
Beddoe was a pioneer in making observations of living people, in particular of their hair and eye colours, which he believed to be valuable evidence of the origins of the British people. His essay The Origin of the English Nation won a prize offered by the Welsh National Eisteddfod in 1867. This was later expanded and published in 1885 as Races of Britain.

Beddoe gave the Rhind Lectures in 1891, on 'The Anthropological History of Europe'.
