= Sir Alexander Christison, 2nd Baronet =

Scottish army surgeon (1828–1918)

Sir Alexander Christison, 2nd Baronet (26 August 1828 – 14 October 1918) was a member of the Edinburgh Christison medical dynasty. He was one of the first doctors to write on the medical benefits of cannabis.

He spent most of his working life in India. On return to Scotland he made major advances in achieving medical training for women.

== Life ==
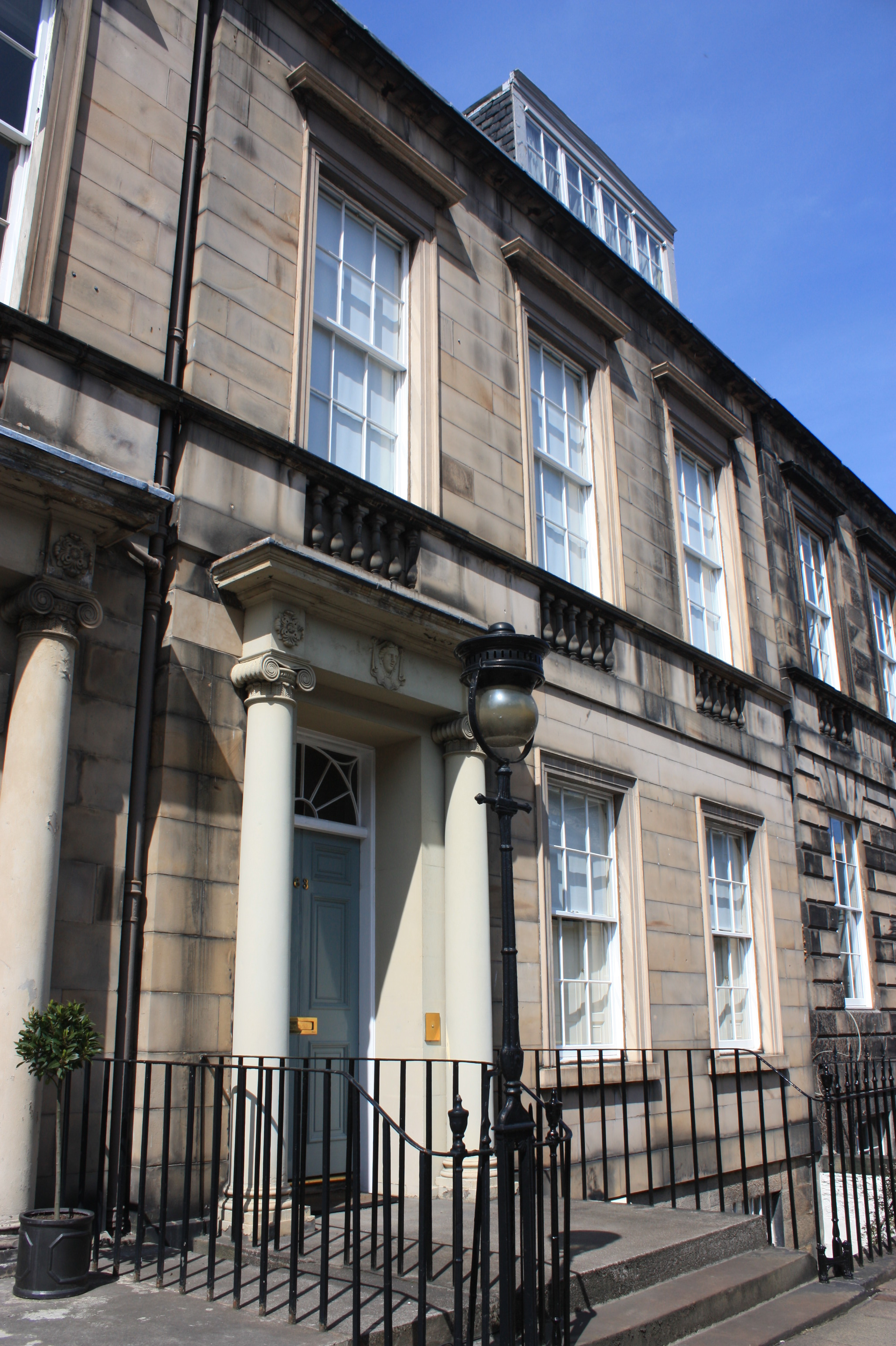
63 Northumberland Street, Edinburgh

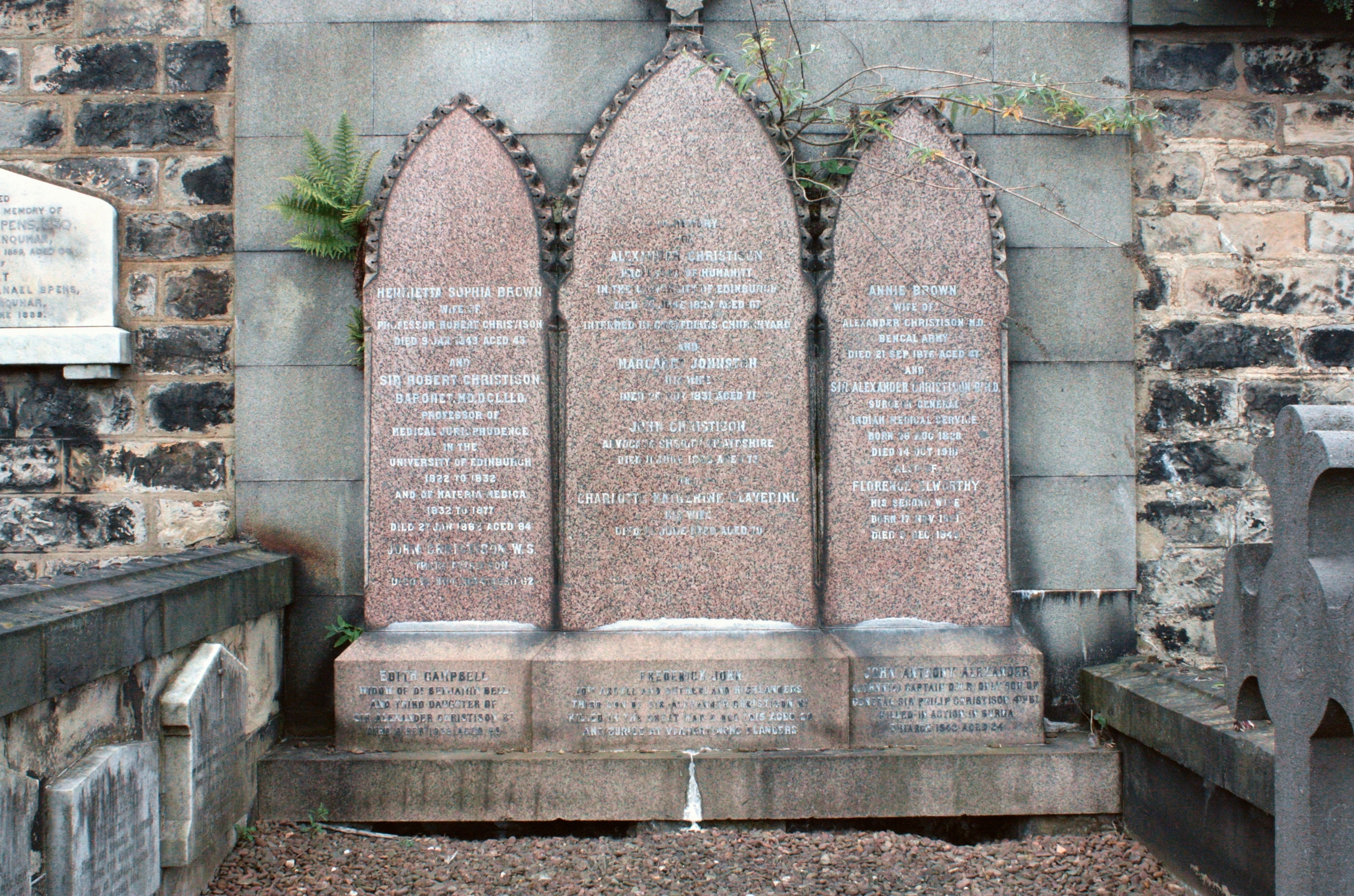
Christison grave, New Calton Cemetery

He was born on 26 August 1828 at 63 Northumberland Street in Edinburgh's New Town the son of Henrietta Sophia Brown and Robert Christison, Professor of Medical Jurisprudence at the University of Edinburgh. The house was then a new house, designed by Robert Reid and William Sibbald. He was named after his paternal grandfather, Professor Alexander Christison.

He was educated at Edinburgh Academy then studied medicine at the University of Edinburgh. He gained his doctorate (MD) in 1850 with a thesis on the medical uses of cannabis. In 1851, he obtained a post as assistant surgeon to the Honourable East India Company and served with the 4th Sikh Infantry in the Second Anglo-Burmese War 1852/53 winning a campaign medal and clasp.

He served with the 1st Cavalry 1855 to 1857 and accompanied Meade's Horse regiment at the Mutinies of Gwalior and Agra in 1858, again receiving a campaign medal and clasp. He then gave medical support to the 18th Bengal Infantry. Late in 1858 he was made superintendent of vaccination and lecturer in surgery at Agra Medical School. He rose to be Principal of the school in 1865 and also took on a role as Principal of Agra Lunatic Asylum. Still connected to the military by 1879 he was Surgeon General for the entire North-West Provinces.

He retired in 1882, following the death of his father, and his creation as 2nd baronet, and returned to Edinburgh. Here he joined his brother David Christison at 40 Moray Place, his parents' large townhouse on the Moray Estate. In Edinburgh he busied himself in various medical matters. Most notably he strived to reverse his father's anti-female stance in the education of women and more specifically women doctors. He was President of the Scottish Association for the Medical Education of Women. In 1885 he was elected a member of the Harveian Society of Edinburgh. He was President of the Royal Victoria Hospital from its foundation in 1887. He ran several campaigns to reduce tuberculosis in Scotland.

He died at home 40 Moray Place in Edinburgh on 14 October 1918 aged 90. He is buried with his family in New Calton Cemetery. The grave lies on a south-facing terrace, just west of the main north–south path, towards the centre.

== Family ==
He was married twice. First to Jemima Anne (Annie) Cowley Brown (possibly a cousin) who died in 1876, then to Florence Elworthy (1851-1949) who was considerably his junior. He had one son and two daughters by his first marriage, and two sons and three daughters by the second marriage.

His youngest son, Lieutenant Frederick John Christison (b.1895) was killed on 4 December 1915 in the First World War while serving with the 10th battalion Argyll and Sutherland Highlanders.

He was succeeded in the baronetcy by his oldest son Major Robert Alexander Christison of the Royal Garrison Artillery.

His cousin, Robert Christison died of tuberculosis in 1915.

Baronetage of the United Kingdom
Preceded by Robert Christison	Baronet (of Moray Place); 1882–1918	Succeeded by Robert Christison
