= James Miller (surgeon) =

Scottish surgeon and medical author

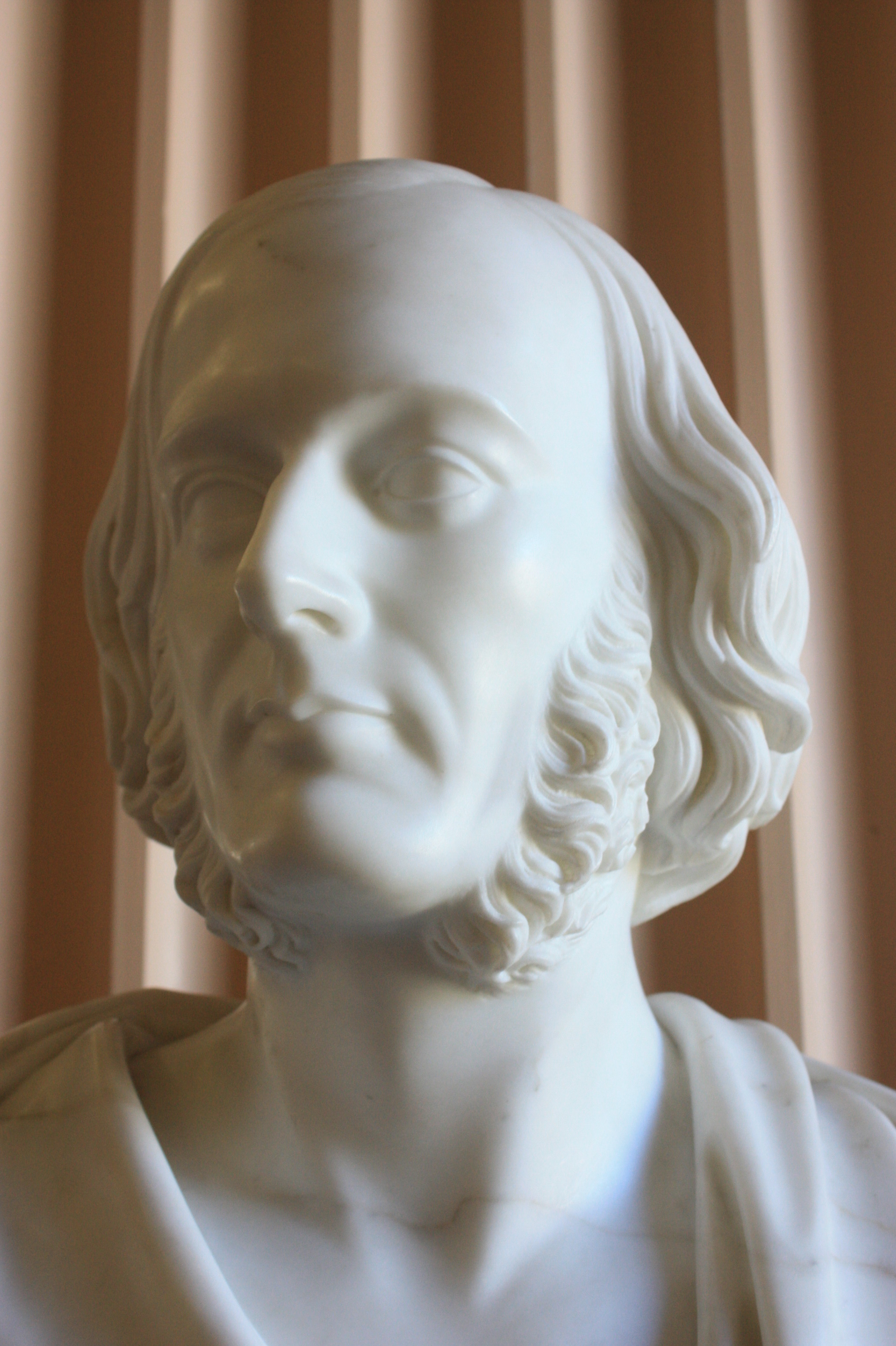
- Bust of James Miller, by Sir John Steell, Old College, University of Edinburgh
- Born: 2 April 1812; Eassie, Angus, Scotland
- Died: 17 June 1864 (aged 52); Edinburgh, Scotland
- Other name: Prof Miller
- Occupation: Scottish surgeon

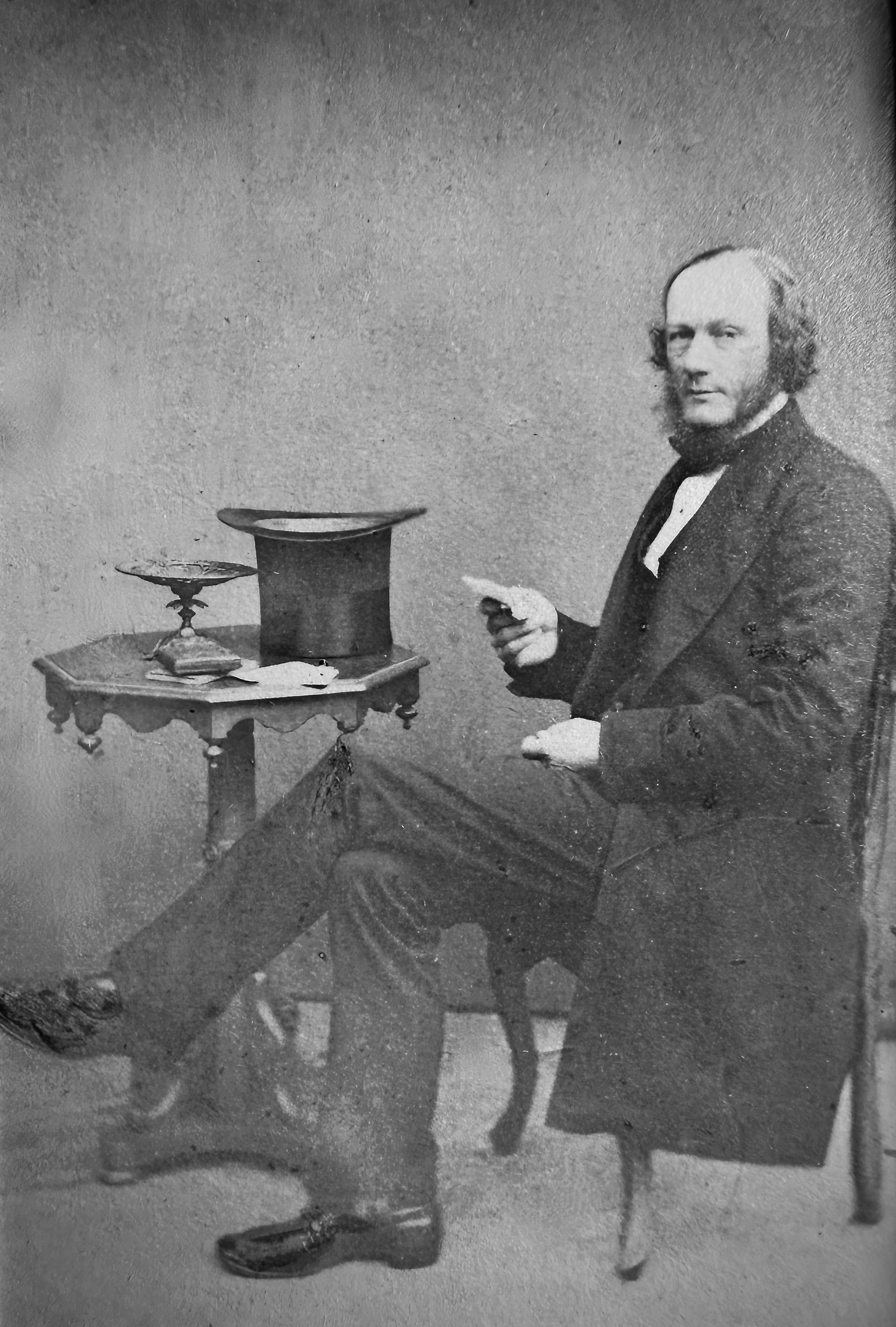

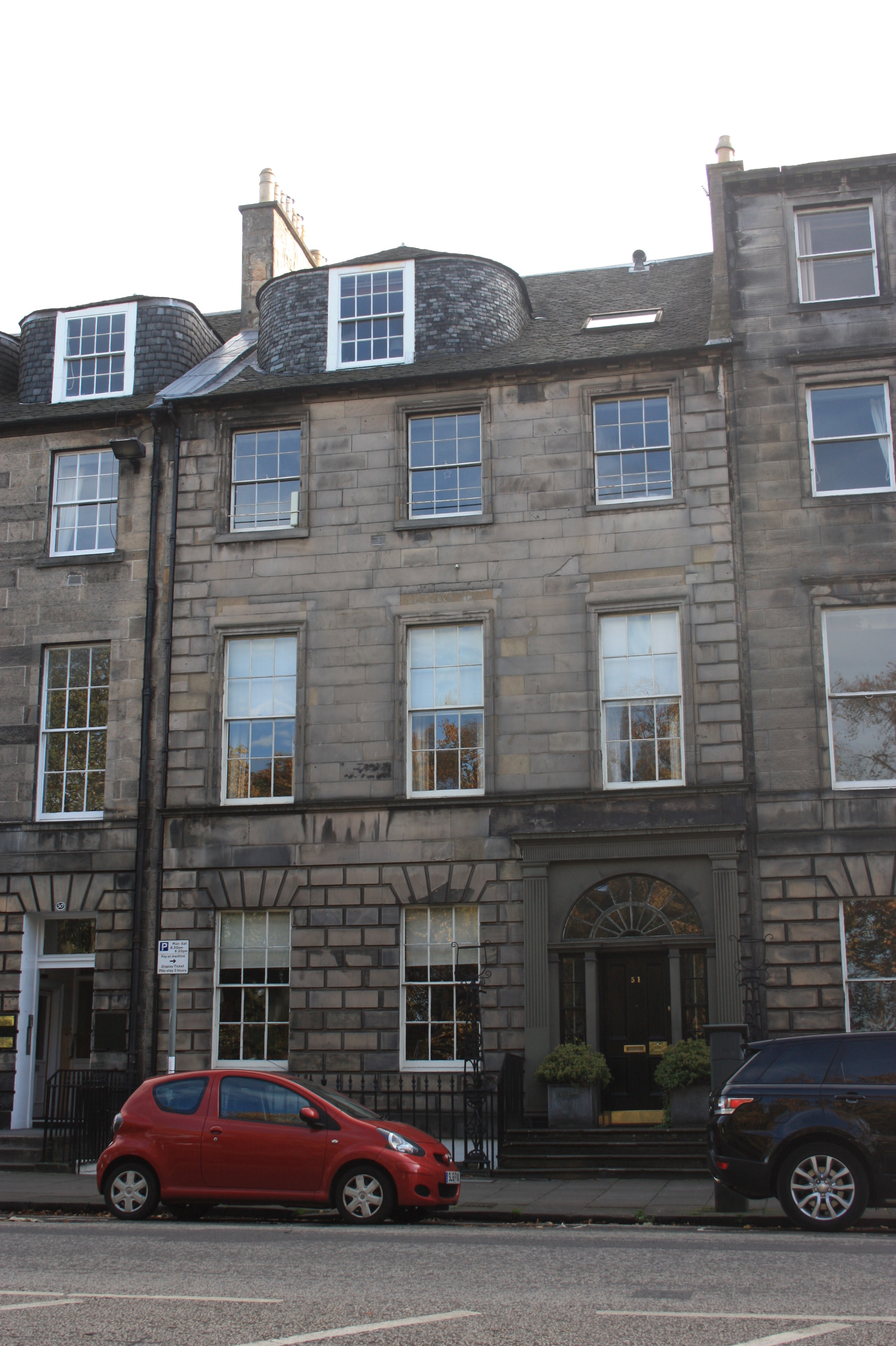
51 Queen Street, Edinburgh

James Miller FRCSEd, FRSE (2 April 1812 – 17 June 1864) was a surgeon and medical author in Edinburgh. He was author of the important 19th-century textbook, Principles of Surgery. Like his father he became a member of the Free Church of Scotland in 1843 and was a firm believer in temperance.

== Life ==
He was born on 2 April 1812 in the manse of Eassie in Angus, the son of Rev James Miller (1777–1860) and Barbara Martin. He studied medicine at both St Andrews University and Edinburgh University.

From 1832 to 1834 he served as assistant to Robert Liston, taking over his practice in 1834. He continued this until 1842 then took up the role of professor of surgery at Edinburgh University. At the same time he acted as principal surgeon to Edinburgh Royal Infirmary. During this period he lived at 51 Queen Street, a handsome Georgian townhouse in Edinburgh's First New Town. Dr James Young Simpson was his immediate neighbour. In 1842 Miller was elected a member of the Harveian Society of Edinburgh and served as President in 1860. In 1843 he was elected a member of the Aesculapian Club.

He later moved to 23 York Place, Edinburgh.

He died at Pinkhill House in Inveresk near Edinburgh on 17 June 1864, and is buried in Grange Cemetery in Edinburgh. The grave lies on the northern wall.

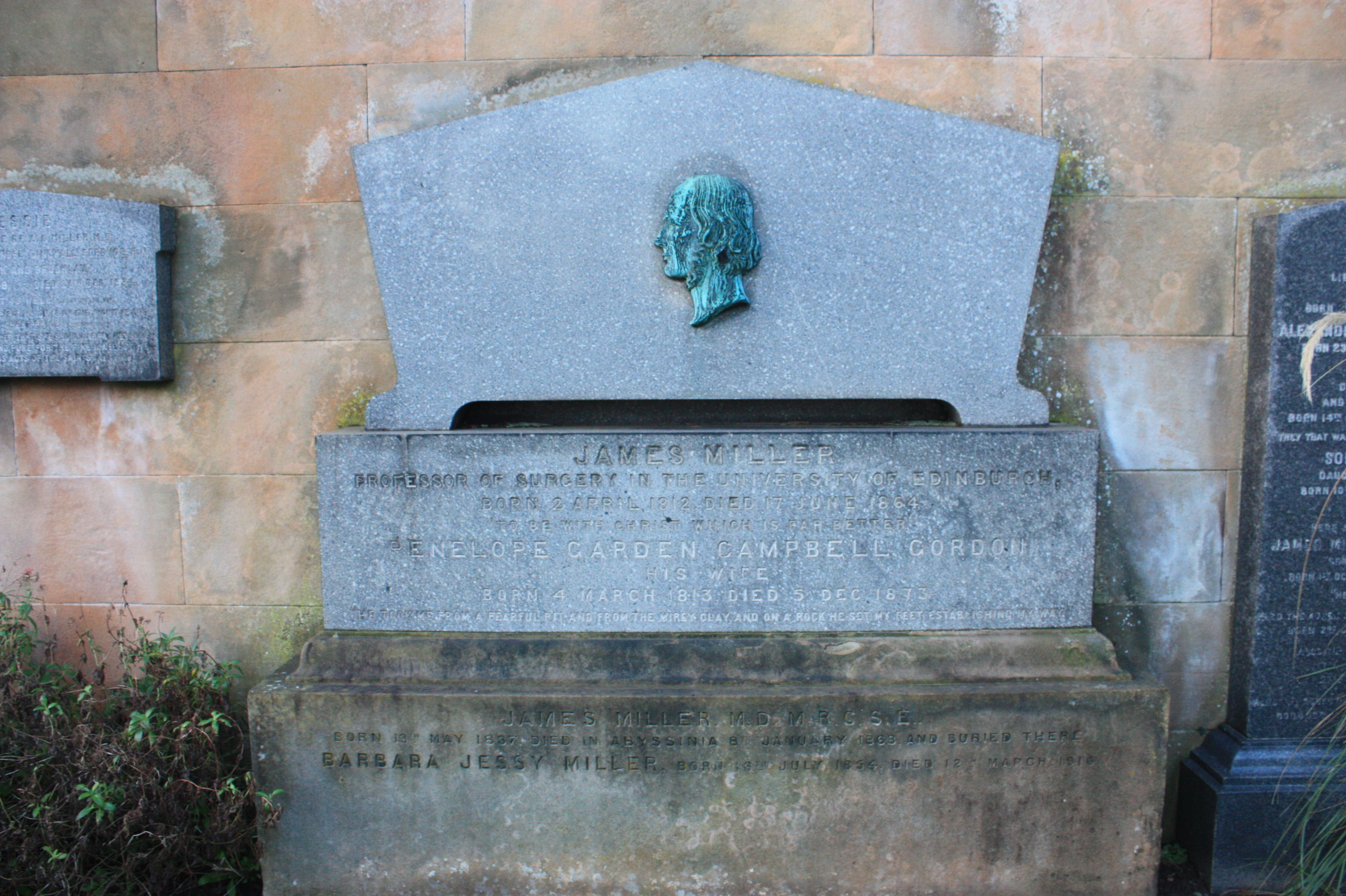
The grave of Prof James Miller, Grange Cemetery, Edinburgh

== Positions held ==
- Fellow of the Royal College of Surgeons of Edinburgh (1840)
- Fellow of the Royal Society of Edinburgh (1842)
- President of the Medico-Chirurgical Society (1856)
- President of the Harveian Society of Edinburgh (1860)

== Publications ==
- Principles of Surgery (1844)
- Practice of Surgery (2 vols: 1844 and 1846)
- Neuenahr A new spa on the Rhine (1861)

== Family ==
He was brother to Robert Miller, surgeon to the governor of Madras.

He married Penelope Garden Campbell Gordon (1813-1873) in 1836. Their daughter, Elizabeth Gordon Miller, married Patrick Heron Watson.

His sons included Dr Alexander Gordon Miller.
