= Foulden, Scottish Borders =

Village in Scottish Borders, Scotland

Coordinates: 55.7954°N 2.1148°W

Foulden
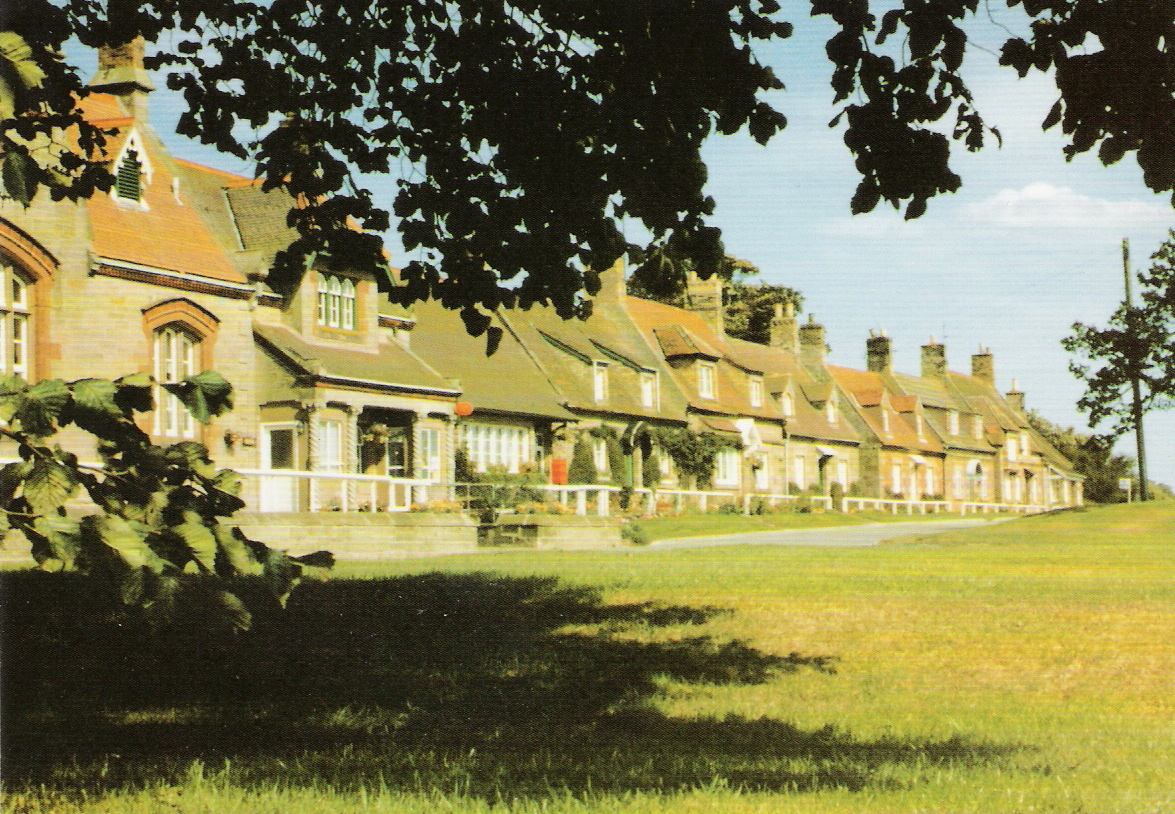
- Foulden Village.

- Location within the Scottish Borders
- OS grid reference: NT932557
- Council area: Scottish Borders
- Lieutenancy area: Berwickshire
- Country: Scotland
- Sovereign state: United Kingdom
- Post town: BERWICK-UPON-TWEED
- Postcode district: TD15
- Police: Scotland
- Fire: Scottish
- Ambulance: Scottish
- UK Parliament: Berwickshire, Roxburgh and Selkirk
- Scottish Parliament: Ettrick, Roxburgh and Berwickshire

Foulden is a civil parish and village in the Berwickshire area of Scottish Borders, Scotland, situated not far above the Whiteadder Water, and 7 miles (11 km) west of Berwick-upon-Tweed.

It has "one of the most striking village ensembles in the Borders" which incorporates the former school of 1881, all designed by John Lessels.

== Lairds ==
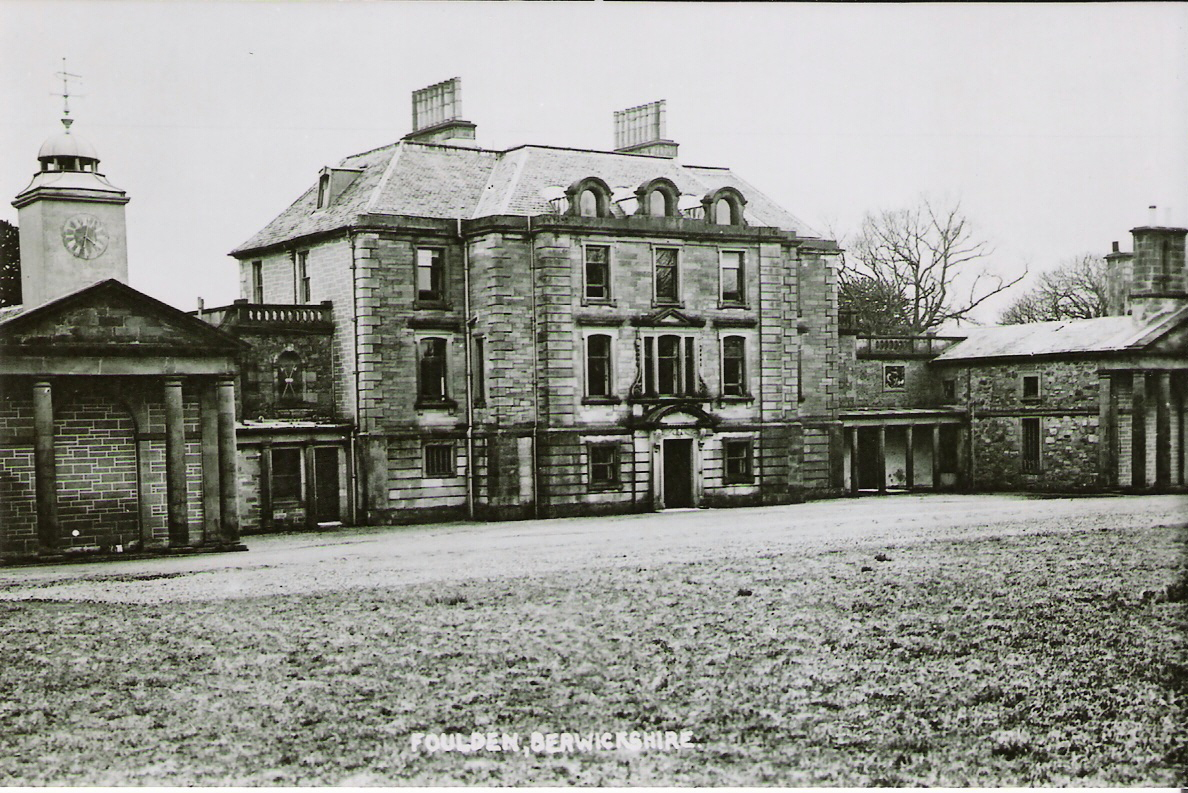
Foulden House c1900

Originally one of the superiorities of Coldingham Priory (a part of the parish is still called Nunlands), at a very early date it was resigned to the Ramsay family for whom it was erected into a Free Barony. William de Ramsay swore fealty to King Edward I of England, for his lands of Dalwolsie (Dalhousie), Edinburghshire, and of Foulden, Berwickshire, in 1296, and again in 1304.

One of this family, George, lived in a tower house at Foulden Bastel and died in January 1592, his tomb is extant. His son James was residing at the Bastel in 1618.

In the 17th century the barony of Foulden and its lands were conveyed to Sir John Wilkie, a rich burgess of Lanark. In 1696 John Wilkie's residence in Foulden had six taxable hearths, virtually everyone else in the vicinity having just one. Foulden remained with this family until they failed in the male line with James Bruce Wilkie of Foulden, a captain in the King's Own Scottish Borderers Regiment, who died on 12 December 1935. The Wilkies were responsible for construction and original ownership of the village. The local manor, Foulden House, rebuilt by the Wilkies circa 1800, had a main Georgian block of three and a half stories, flanked by peristyled and porticoed two-storey pavilion wings. It was a casualty of the post World War II country-house demolitions.

== Early ministers ==
The Ramsay family consolidated their position in Foulden by providing family members as ministers there: Alexander Ramsay was Rector of Foulden in 1562, Thomas (or Tobias) Ramsay (1596–1614), and Thomas Ramsay (1630–1652) who built the tower house at nearby Nether Mordington, today's Edrington House.

The Australian explorer and pastoralist Robert Christison was born and buried here. He was the sixth son of Alexander Christison who was Foulden's minister for over 50 years and his first wife Helen.

== Kirk ==
The parish church and its churchyard date from the 13th century and the present church was rebuilt in 1789. The 18th century Manse, which stands at the entrance to the churchyard, was rebuilt in 1841. The ancient Tithe Barn adjoining the churchyard, one of only two remaining in Scotland, where once The Church's 10% was deposited, is now in the care of and protected by Historic Scotland.

The parish is today conjoined with that of Mordington & Lamberton. Together the three areas form Foulden, Mordington and Lamberton Community Council, which is run by locally elected non party political volunteers.

== Foulden, Mordington and Lamberton Community Council ==
The parish is within the regional authority of the Scottish Borders Council. Now conjoined with its eastern neighbouring parishes, there is a local Foulden Mordington & Lamberton Community Council (similar to an English parish council) which meets bi-monthly.

== See also ==
- List of places in the Scottish Borders
- List of places in Scotland
