= Christison baronets =

Title in the Baronetage of the United Kingdom

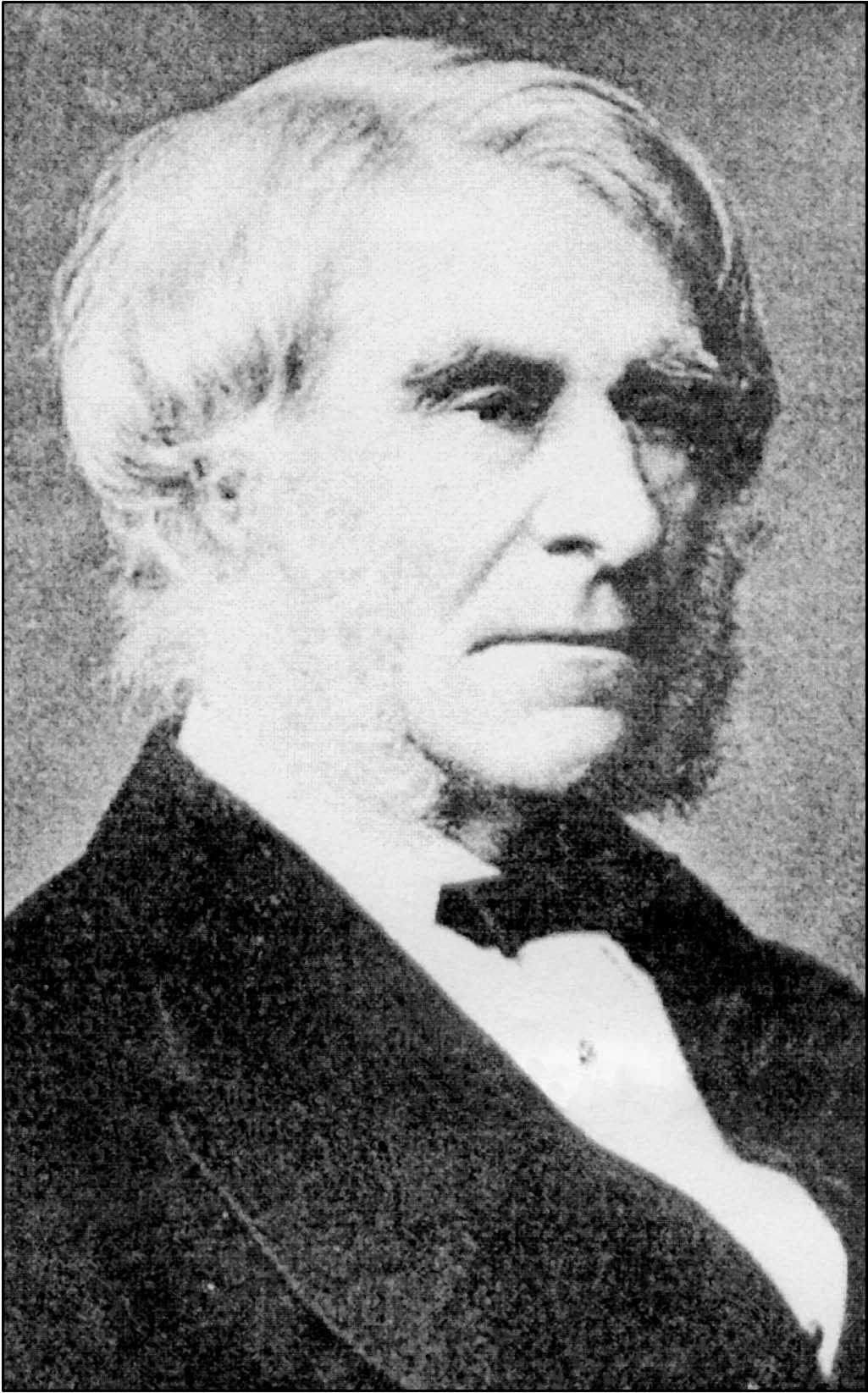
Sir Robert Christison, 1st Baronet

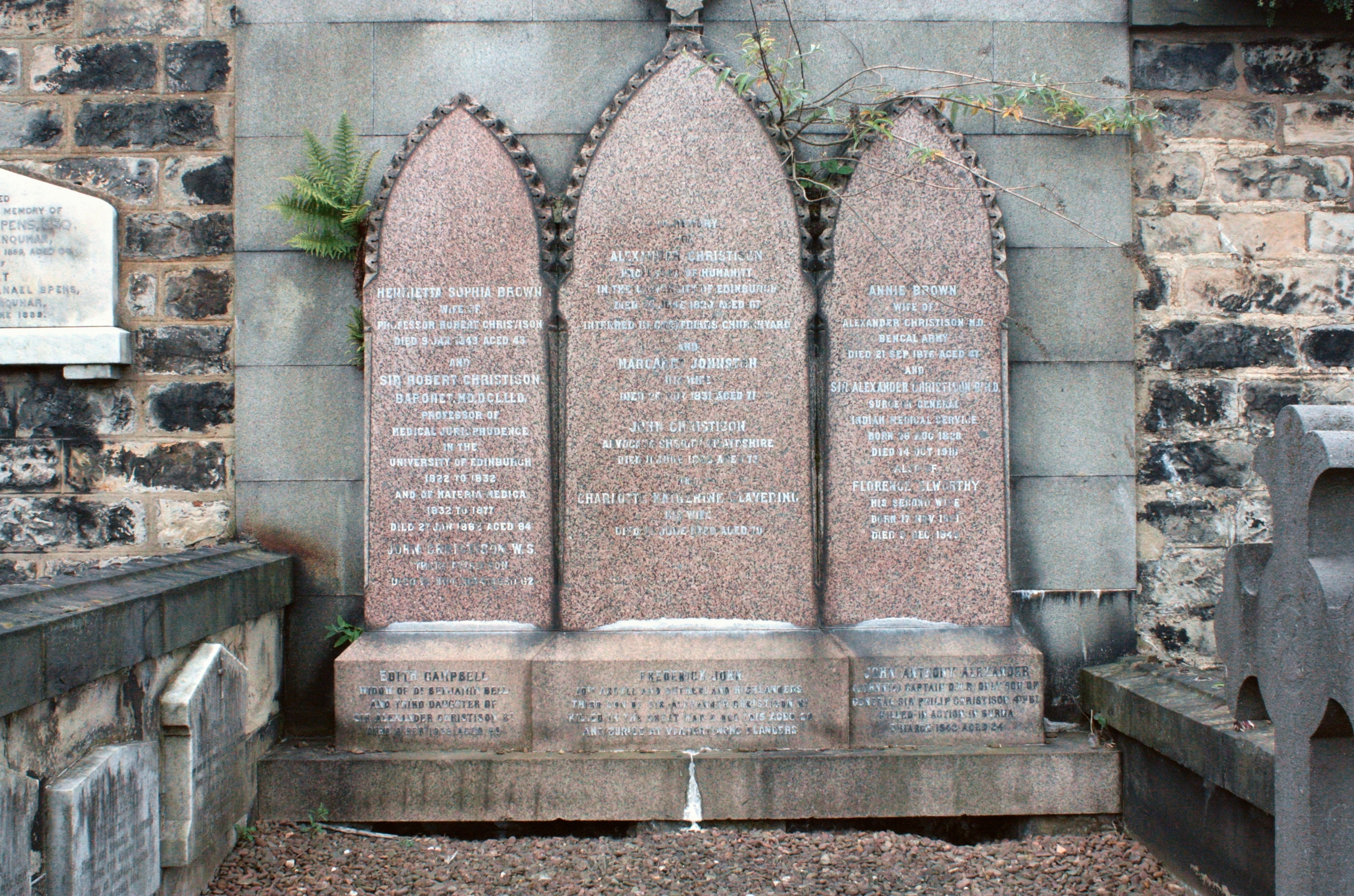
Christison grave, New Calton Cemetery, containing both Robert and his son Alexander

The Christison Baronetcy relates to the Christisons of Moray Place in the city of Edinburgh, and was a title in the Baronetage of the United Kingdom. It was created on 28 November 1871 for the Scottish toxicologist and physician Robert Christison. The fourth Baronet was a general in the British Army and commanding officer of the 2nd battalion of the Duke of Wellington's Regiment. The title became extinct on his death in 1993.

The Australian pastoralist, Robert Christison, was the nephew of the first Baronet.

== Christison baronets, of Moray Place (1871) ==
- Sir Robert Christison, 1st Baronet 1797–1882)
- Sir Alexander Christison, 2nd Baronet (1828–1918)
- Sir Robert Alexander Christison, 3rd Baronet (1870–1945)
- Sir (Alexander Frank) Philip Christison, 4th Baronet (1893–1993)
