= Alexander Christison =

Scottish educator and mathematician

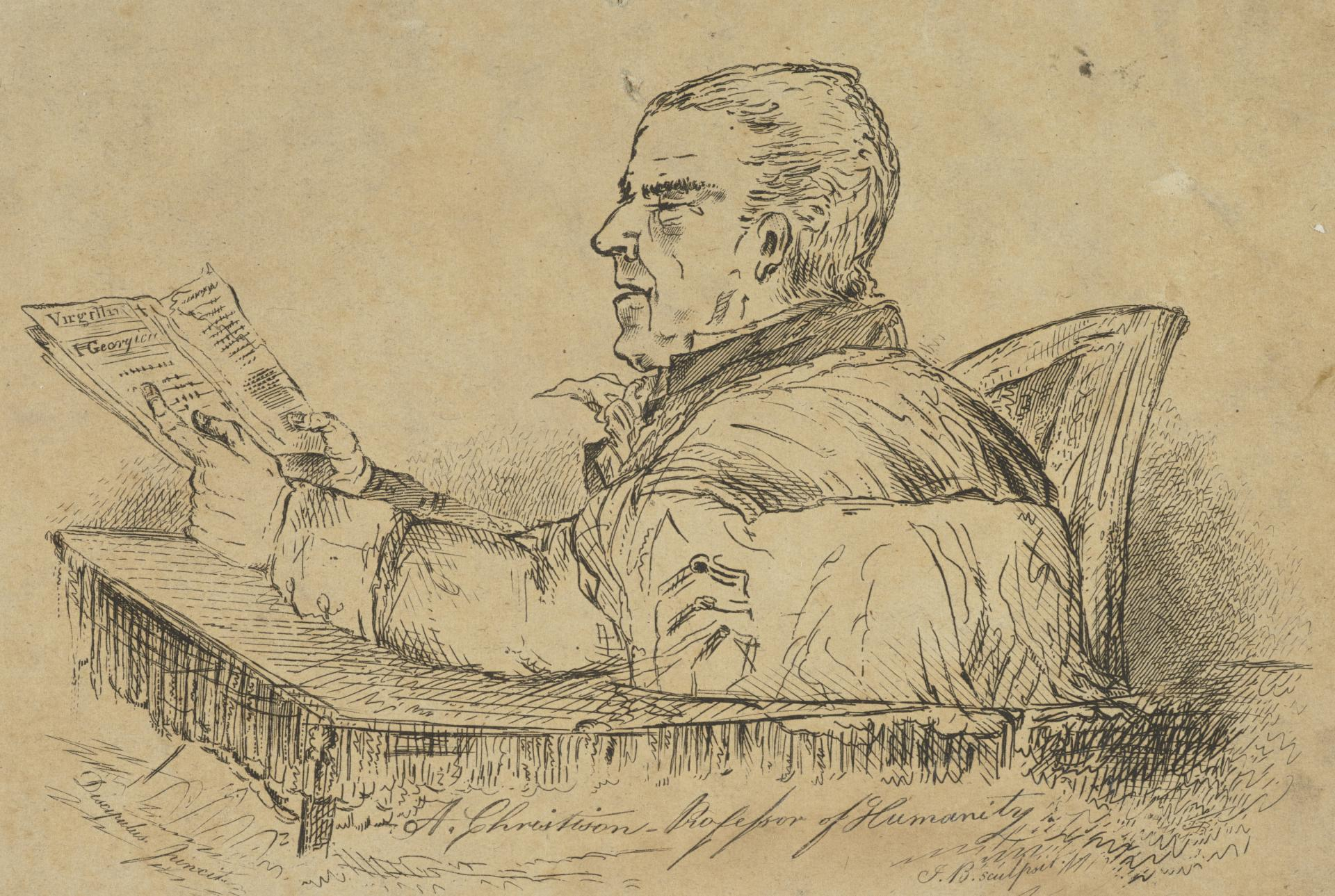
Alexander Christison.

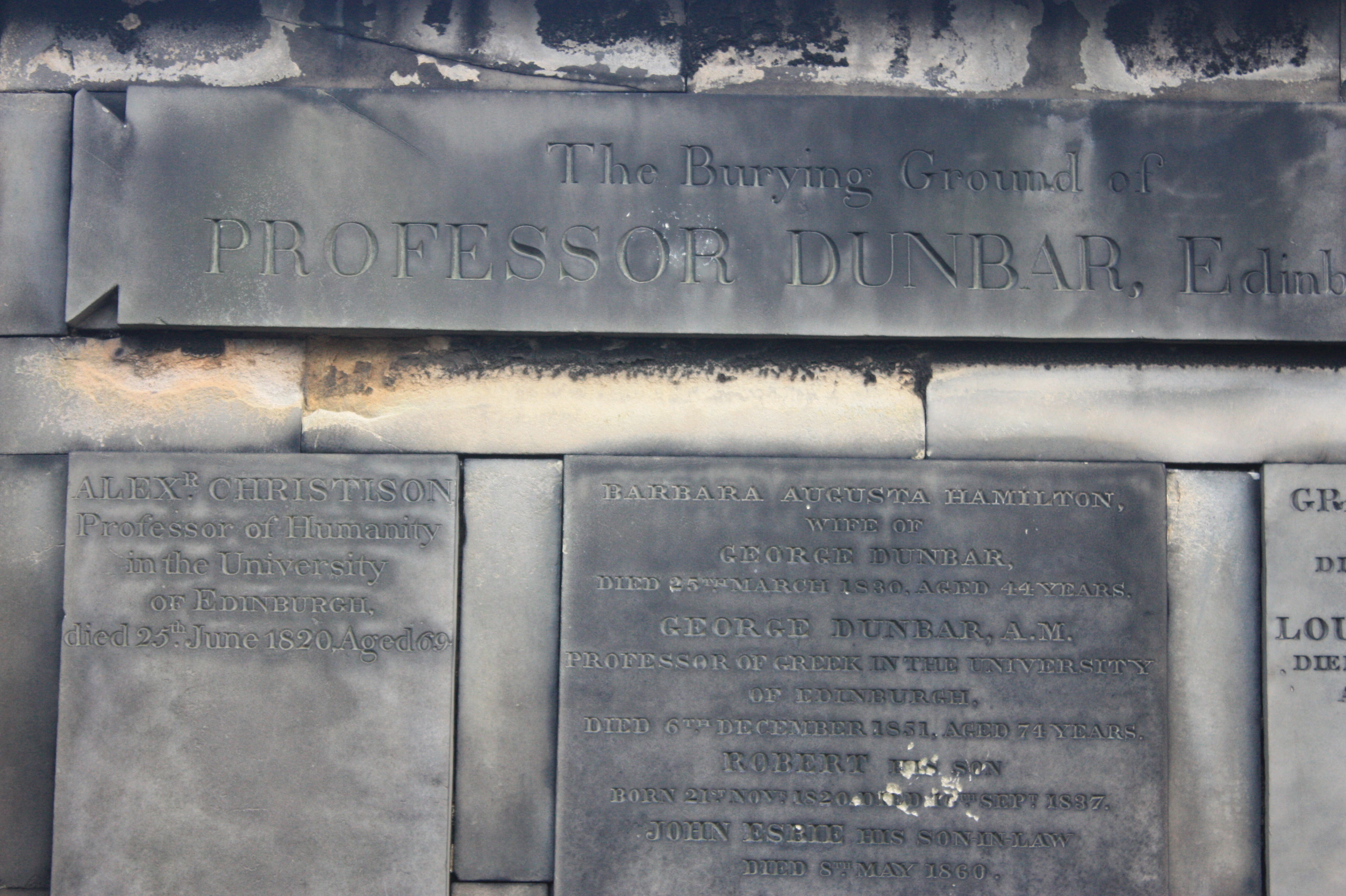
The grave of Alexander Christison, Greyfriars Kirkyard

Alexander Christison FRSE (1751–1820) was a Scottish educator, Professor of Humanity at the University of Edinburgh, and mathematician during the Scottish Enlightenment.

== Life ==
He was born in 1753, at Redpath House, Longformacus, Berwickshire. He was the eldest of seven children to a tenant sheep-farmer in the Lammermuir Hills.

After a local education he began employment as the local schoolteacher for the parish of Edrom before attending the University of Edinburgh to study Classics, graduating in 1775. This background gave him access to teach at a higher calibre of school and he taught both at George Watson’s College, Dalkeith Grammar School and the High School in Edinburgh. In the 1780s he lived at Alexander's Land in the Bristo area.

He was elected a Fellow of the Royal Society of Edinburgh in 1800 his main proposer being the physician, James Gregory. He trained under John Hill at the University of Edinburgh and graduated MA in 1806, and from that date he served as professor of humanity at the university.

He died in Edinburgh on 25 June 1820 and is buried in Greyfriars Kirkyard in the city centre. He is buried in the plot of Professor George Dunbar at the north-west section of the western extension. He is also memorialised on Robert Christison's grave at New Calton.

== Family ==
Christison's son was Scottish toxicologist Robert Christison and Scottish minister (another) Alexander Chistison. His grandchildren included Sir Alexander Christison. and the Australian explorer and pastoralist Robert Christison.

== Publications ==
- On the General Diffusion of Knowledge (1802) in which he said "genius is no respecter of ranks"
