= David Christison =

Scottish physician, botanist, writer and antiquary

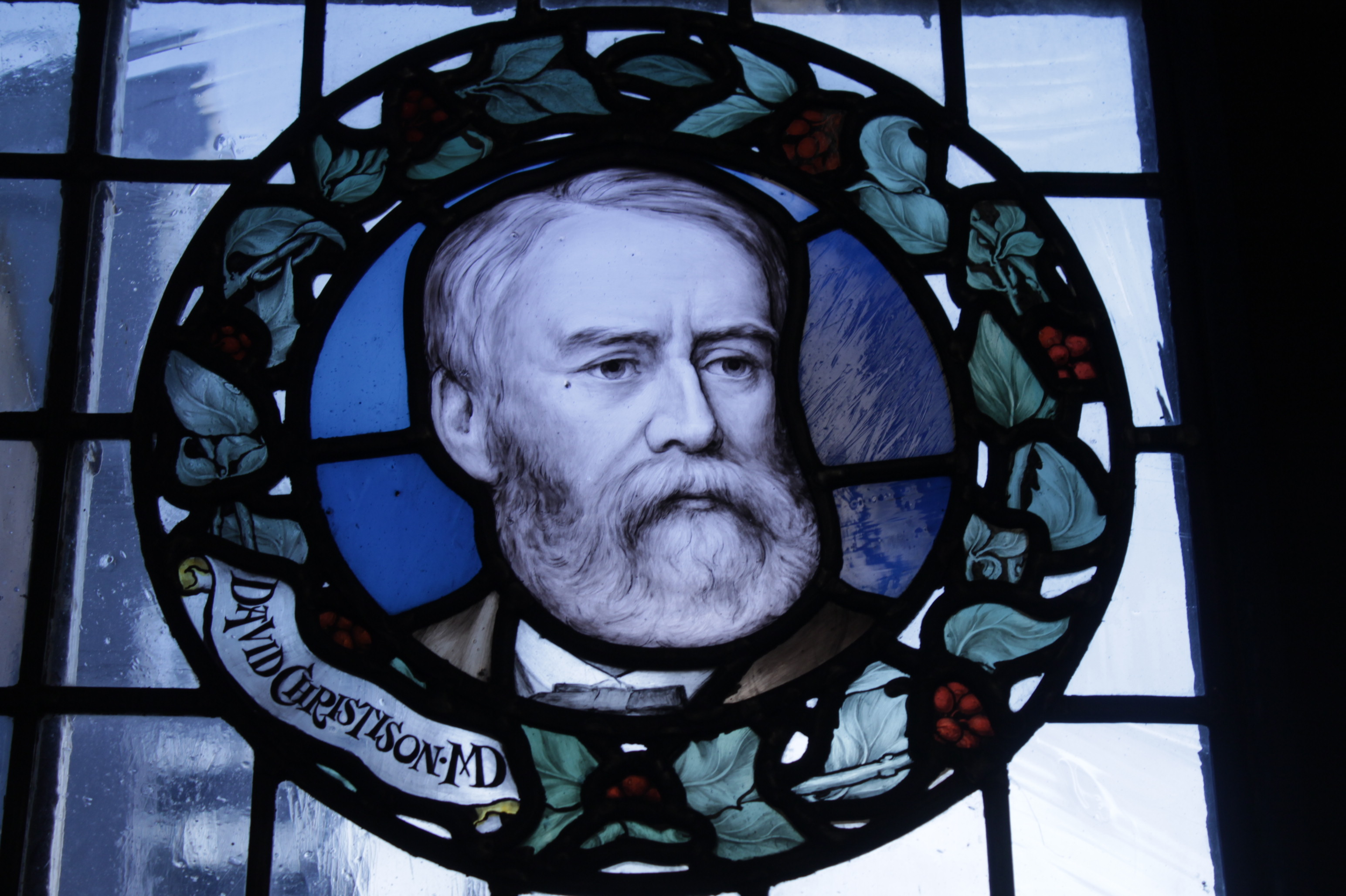
Dr David Christison in stained glass at the Scottish National Portrait Gallery, Edinburgh

David Christison FRCPE LLD (25 January 1830–21 January 1912) was a Scottish physician, botanist, writer and antiquary. He served as a military doctor during the Crimean War, at which time, owing to illness, he abandoned his medical career. From the 1860s onwards Christison travelled extensively in South America and became a travel writer, publishing an account of his journeys within Paraguay, and other books on topics relating to that country. He also turned to archaeology in which, through his interest in botany, he made advances in the science of dendrochronology. He became a pioneer of systematic field study in archaeological research and was one of the first to carry out an extensive investigation of Scotland's ancient hillforts, writing and publishing extensively on the topic in later life.

== Birth and education ==
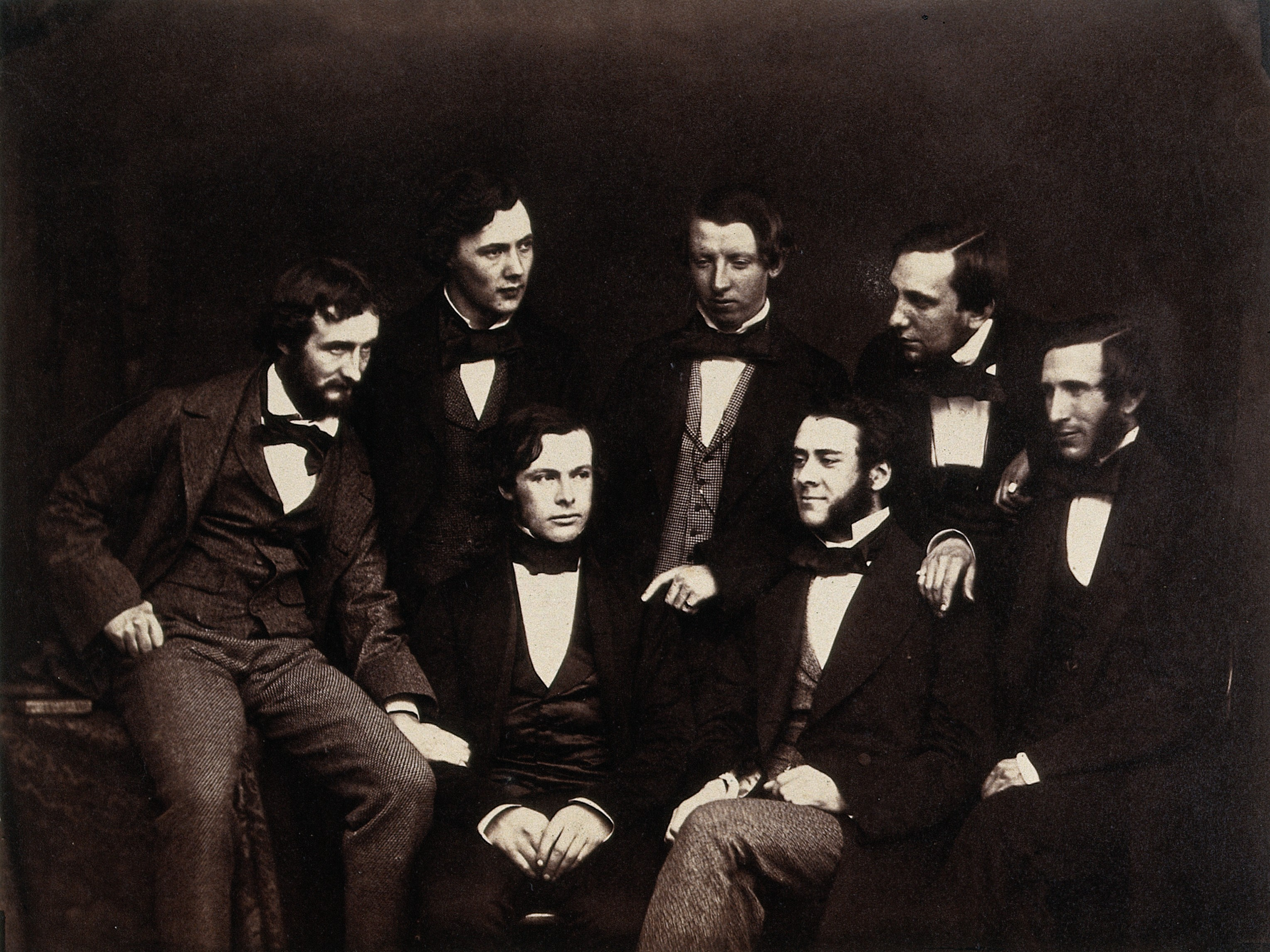
David Christison (front centre right, seated) together with other Royal Infirmary of Edinburgh physicians, including John Beddoe (far left), Joseph Lister (centre left seated), and Patrick Heron Watson (second from right). Alexander Struthers, who will die during medical service in the Crimean War, is probably the figure seated on the far right.

Christison was born on 25 January 1830 in Edinburgh's New Town, at 3 Great Stuart Street on the Moray Estate. He was the second son of Henrietta Sophia Brown and Sir Robert Christison, 1st Baronet, and distinguished physician. He was educated at the Edinburgh Academy, and then studied medicine at the University of Edinburgh. He began his medical career in the Old Royal Infirmary where his peer group included Joseph Lister, Patrick Heron Watson and Alexander Struthers, brother of the anatomist John Struthers. Christison gained his first doctorate (MD) in 1851.

== Crimea ==
In 1854, Christison volunteered as a physician in the Crimean War. He travelled to the war zone as part of a group of fellow Scots, including his brother-in-law John Beddoe. While stationed at the Renkioi military hospital in the Dardanelles, he fell seriously ill and had to terminate his medical career. One of his colleagues from his time employed at the Royal Infirmary, Alexander Struthers, died in the British Army's infamous Scutari Hospital in Istanbul where illnesses were rife due to poor conditions.

Christison's personal boxed pistol featured on the History Hunters TV programme

== South America ==
From 1867 onwards, in an effort to improve his health, Christison took trips to South America. His travels included journeys to Argentina and Uruguay principally to study the plant life. As a travel writer, he later publish a series of books including: A Journey into Central Uruguay (1880), The Gauchos of San Jorge, Central Uruguay (1881) and Thunder Squalls in Uruguay (1887).

== Archaeological observations ==
After retiring from the medical profession, Christison took an interest in archaeology, becoming a strong advocate for methodical and rigorous observation in the discipline. He undertook a systematic study of Scotland's hillforts through field research, visiting a large number of sites over several years. He published accounts of his findings on a regular basis in Proceedings of the Society of Antiquaries of Scotland. His careful expositions often include direct witness of examples of thoughtless loss, damage and degradation to unprotected sites in his lifetime, as for example the following on the Castle of Doon, Ayrshire, in 1893:

"This interesting ruin is situated on a small, smooth rock-island in Loch Doon, and the whole space between the walls and the water [...] is covered with loose blocks, certainly not derived from the castle wall of enciente, which still stands to nearly its full height; although, alas! tottering to its fall, the stones of the pediment having been disgracefully allowed to be torn away a few years ago — a wanton destruction of one of the most interesting ruins in Scotland which is to be lamented."

In 1894, Christison delivered the Rhind lectures and in 1898 published a connected analysis of his results in his book, Early Fortifications in Scotland. As the first comprehensive survey of hillforts in the British Isles, often critical of previous neglect of the subject, it was through this work that Christison helped to pioneer a fuller and more meticulous understanding of the history and significance of these sites than had hitherto been the case. His example became a model for subsequent national and regional studies.

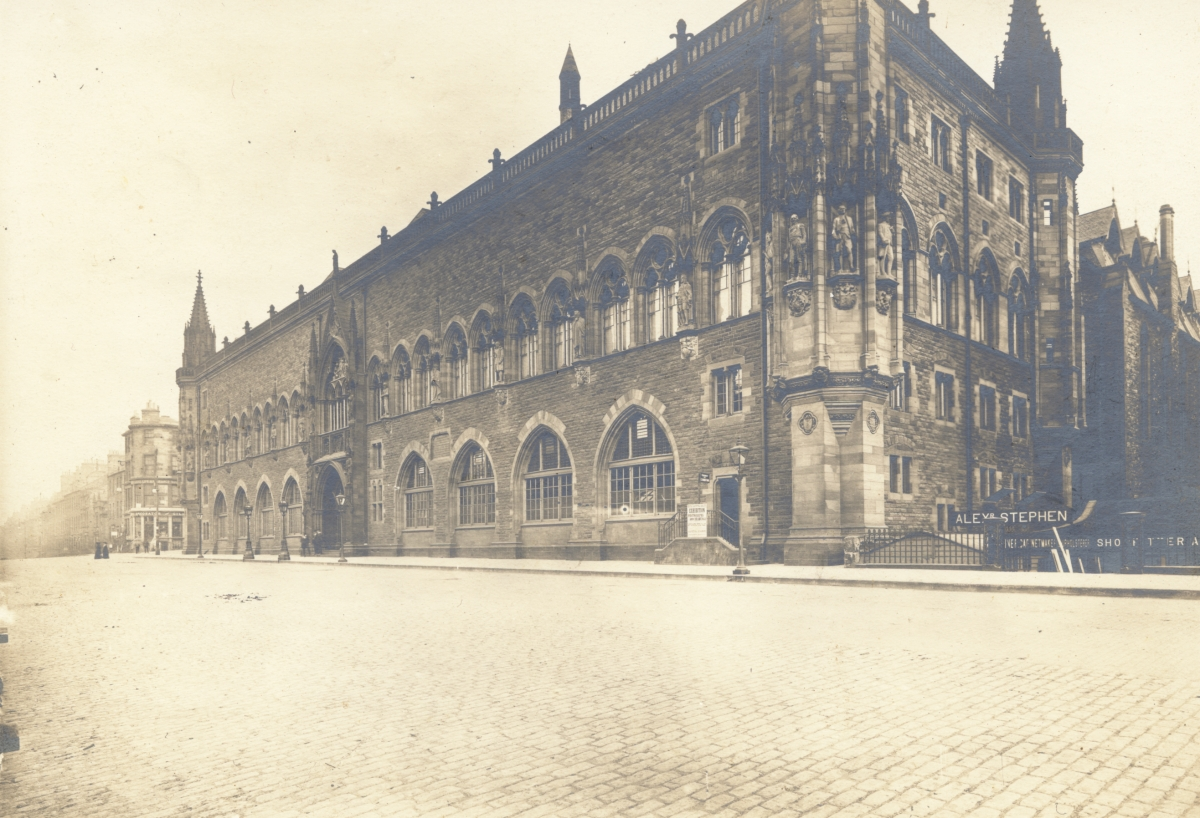
Exterior of Robert Rowand Anderson's distinctive gallery building on Queen Street, Edinburgh, custom-built to house Scotland's National Museum of Antiquities and National Portrait Gallery (1905)

Christison was Secretary of the Society of Antiquaries of Scotland in 1891 when the society's sizable collection of objects of historical and cultural interest to Scotland was transferred to the newly opened National Museum of Antiquities of Scotland. This was housed in Robert Rowand Anderson's distinctive custom-built red sandstone gallery building, designed also for the Scottish National Portrait Gallery, with each institution at that time occupying one half of the building side-by-side.

== Recognition ==
In 1874 he was elected a member of the Harveian Society of Edinburgh.

Christison was Secretary of the Scottish Society from 1888 to 1904

In 1906 Christison was awarded an honorary doctorate (LLD) by Dean Ludovic Grant from the University of Edinburgh.

His portrait in stained glass by William Graham Boss is one of the portraits of members of the Society of Antiquaries of Scotland on the main stair of the Scottish National Portrait Gallery.

He died on 21 January 1912 and is buried in the family plot at New Calton Burial Ground.

== Family ==
In 1870, Christison's residence in Edinburgh was at 40 Moray Place. In later life he lived at 20 Magdala Crescent in Edinburgh's West End. Part of Edinburgh's Christison dynasty, he married his cousin Susannah Hodgson Brown. Together they had three daughters and a son. In 1914, their son, John Alexander Christison, died suddenly of malaria while in Uganda.

== Selected publications ==
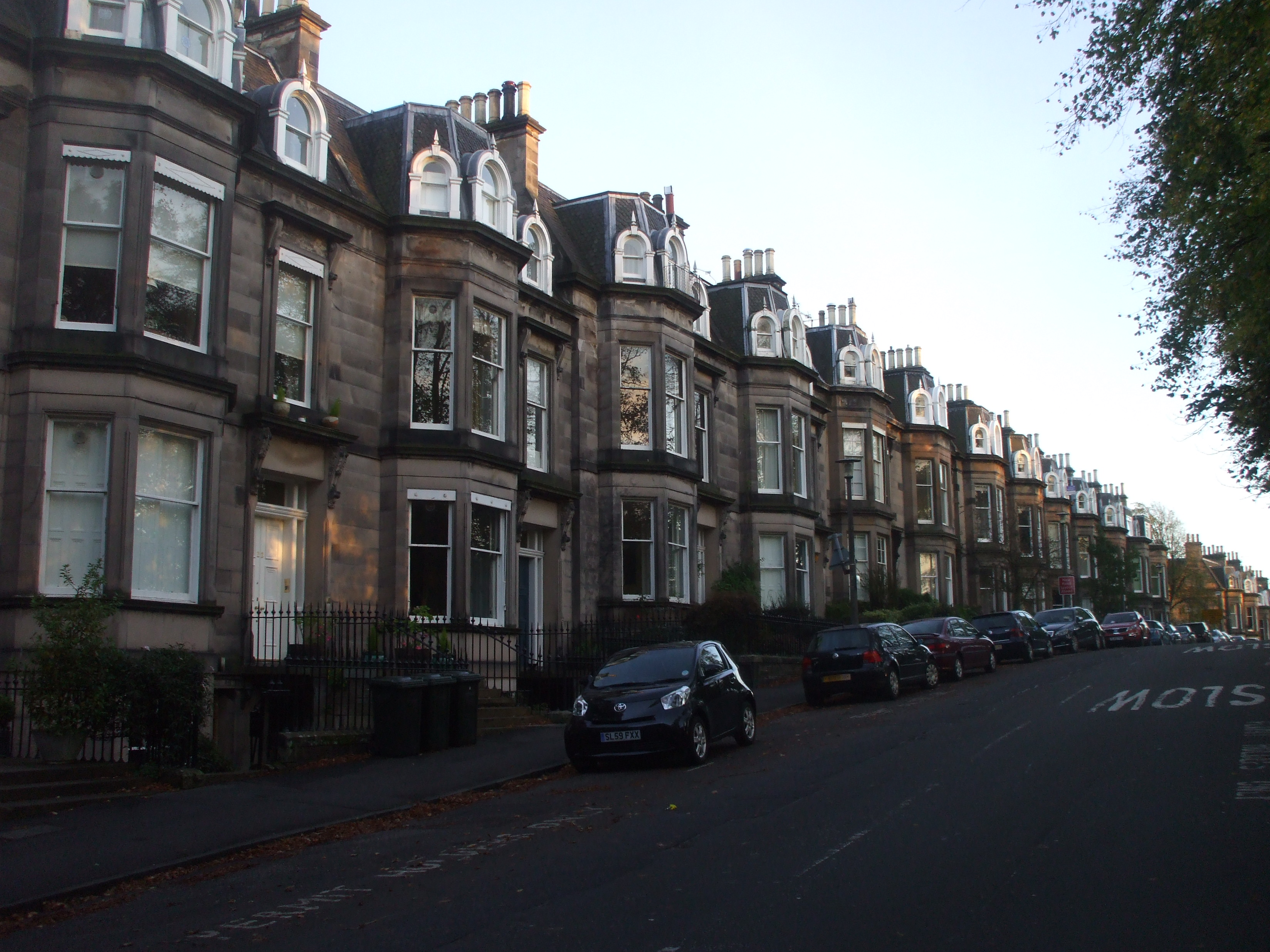
Magdala Crescent, Edinburgh

- A Journey to Central Uruguay (1880)
- The Gauchos of San Jorge, Central Uruguay (1881)
- The Life of Sir Robert Christison (1885)
- Thunder Squalls in Uruguay (1887)
- The Size, Age and Rate of Girth Increase achieved by trees of the Chief Species in Britain, particularly in Scotland (1893)
- On the Geographical Distribution of Certain Place Names in Scotland (1893)
- The Prehistoric Forts of Scotland (1894) the Rhind Lecture
- Early Fortifications in Scotland: Motes, Camps and Forts (1898) Edinburgh and London: William Blackwood and Sons https://journals.socantscot.org/index.php/psas/article/view/6404
- Excavation of the Roman Station at Ardoch, Perthshire (1898) https://journals.socantscot.org/index.php/psas/article/view/6712
- (1902). The Carvings and Inscriptions on the Kirkyard Monuments of the Scottish Lowlands; particularly in Perth, Fife, Angus, Mearns, and Lothian. Proceedings of the Society of Antiquaries of Scotland, 36, 280–457.
- The Excavation of Rough Castle on the Antonine Wall (1905) https://journals.socantscot.org/index.php/psas/article/view/6956
