= William Christison =

William Christison (c.1520–1603) was a Church of Scotland minister immediately after the Reformation, who served as Moderator of the General Assembly in July 1569.

== Life ==
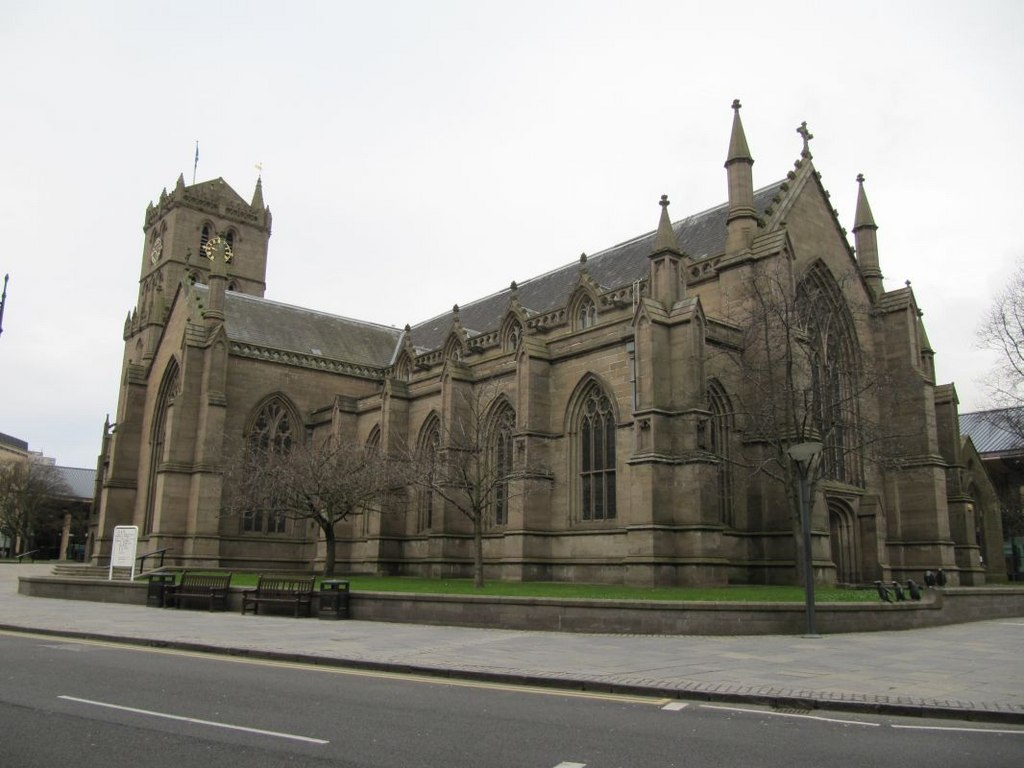
The huge Dundee Parish Church (St Mary's)

He was appointed minister of St Mary's Dundee in July 1560 by the Lords of the Congregation. He was a member of the first General Assembly in December 1560 and attended 38 out of 60 Assemblies in his lifetime.

Christon also took charge of Dundee Library and contribute many of his own books upon his death.

In July 1569 he succeeded David Lindsay as Moderator of the General Assembly of the Church of Scotland the highest position in the Scottish church.

In November 1569 he was formally presented to the vicarage by King James VI. In 1574 the parish of Ballumbie was added to his responsibilities.

In the General Assembly of January 1571 he was appointed Visitor (Inspector) of the upper parts of Mar, the Garioch, Angus and Mearns, to eradicate idolatry.

In 1589 the Privy Council made him a Commissioner for the Defence of the True Religion in the Angus region but he was declared too old and infirm to perform this duty and was retired from this role in 1597.

He died in 1603.

== Family ==
He was married to Ann Wynton who outlived him.
