= Patrick Heron Watson =

Scottish surgeon and pioneer of anaesthetic development

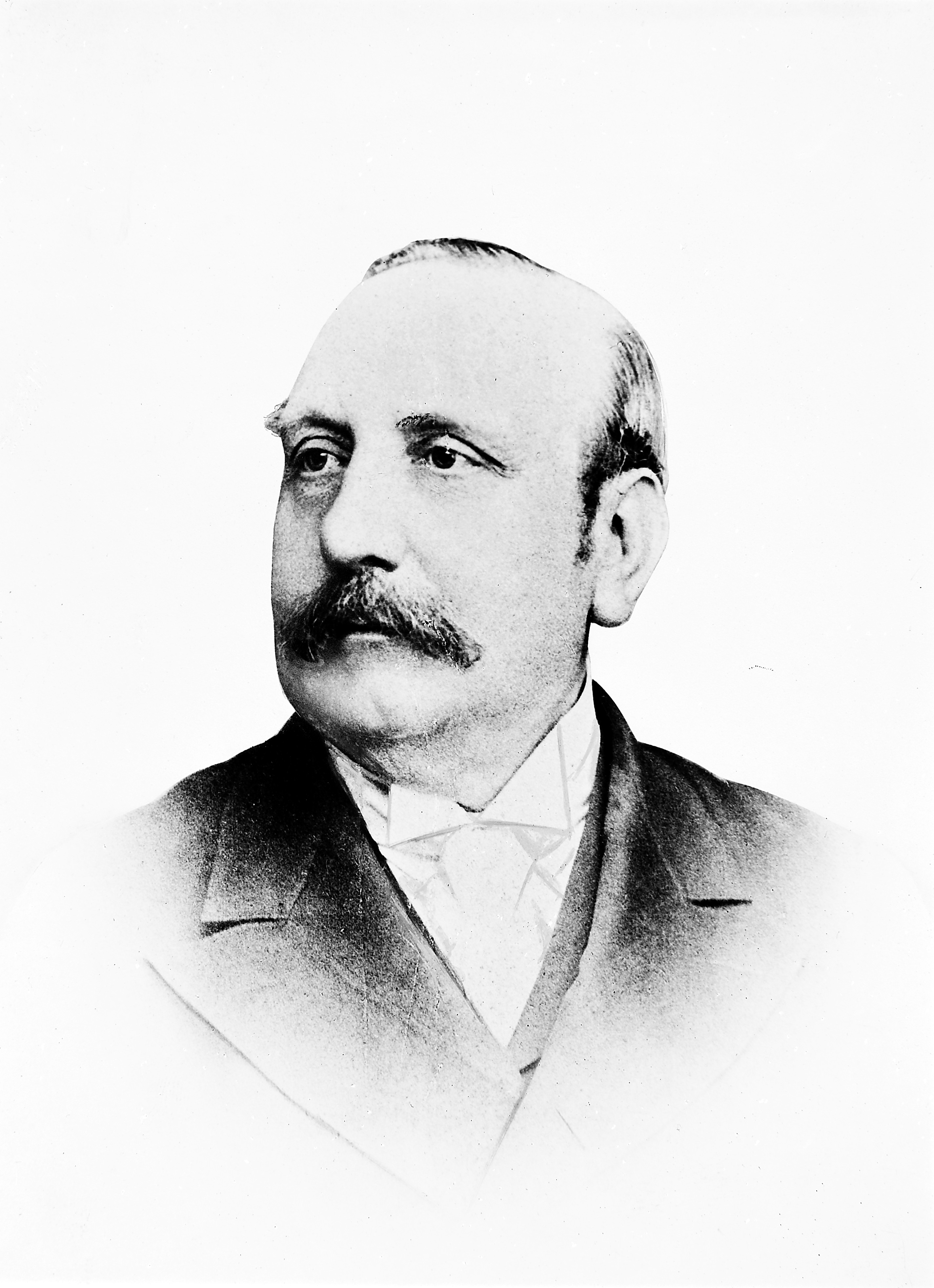
- Born: 5 January 1832
- Died: 21 December 1907 (aged 75)
- Education: University of Edinburgh
- Medical career
- Profession: Doctor
- Field: Surgery
- Institutions: University of Edinburgh

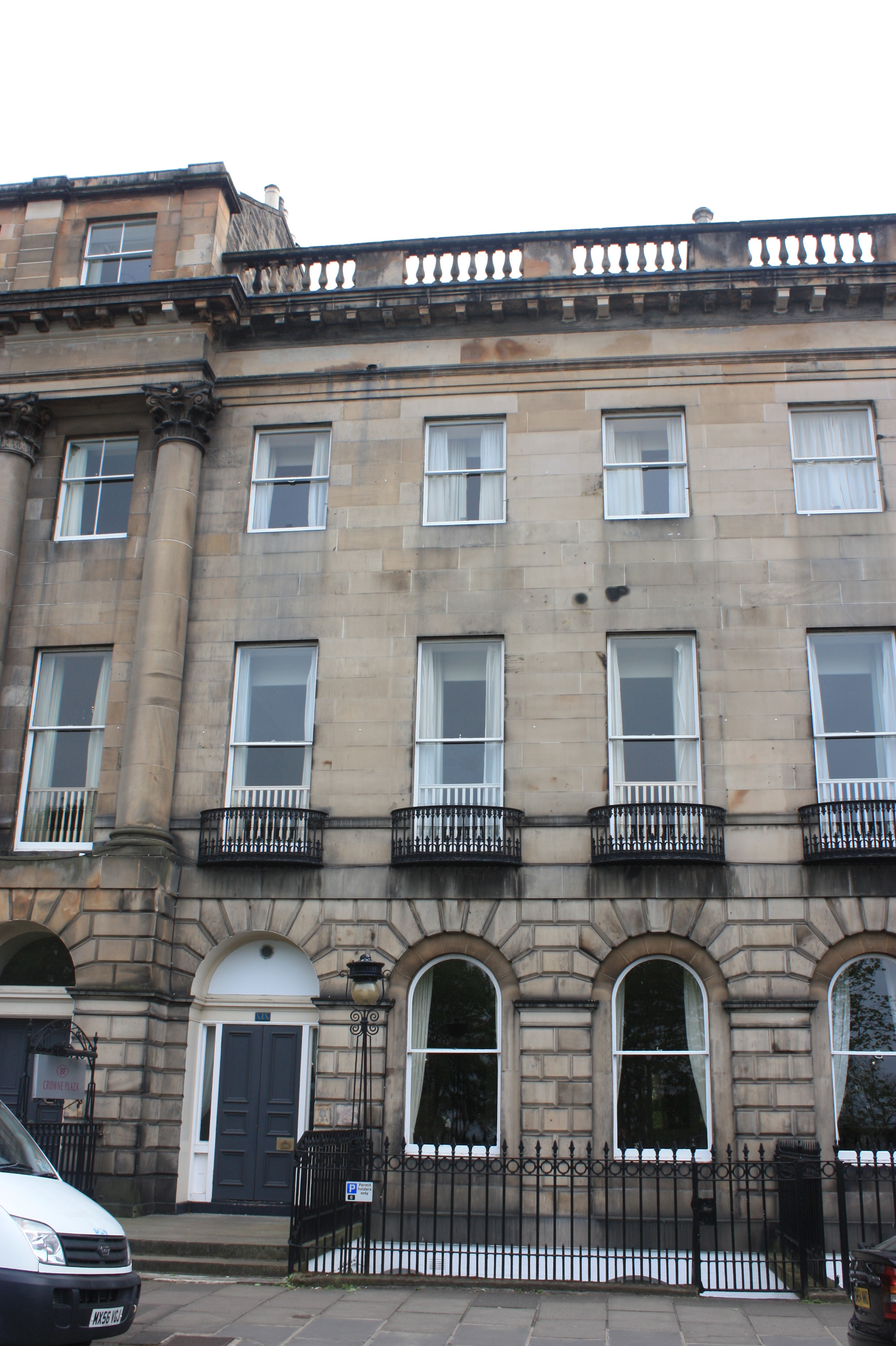
The Watson's impressive townhouse at 19 Royal Terrace, Edinburgh

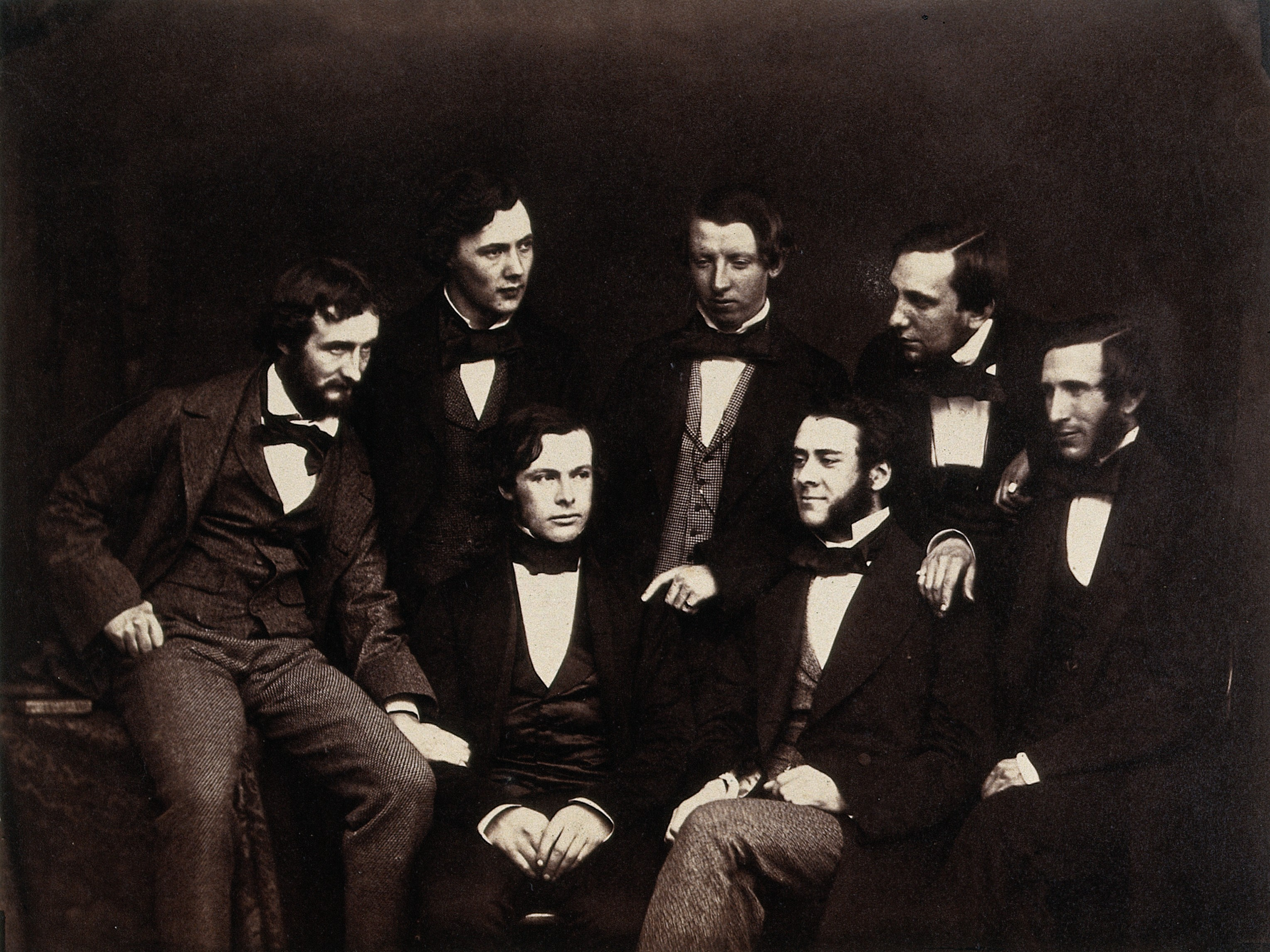
Patrick Heron Watson (second from right) with other Residents at the Old Royal Infirmary, Edinburgh, including Joseph Lister and John Beddoe

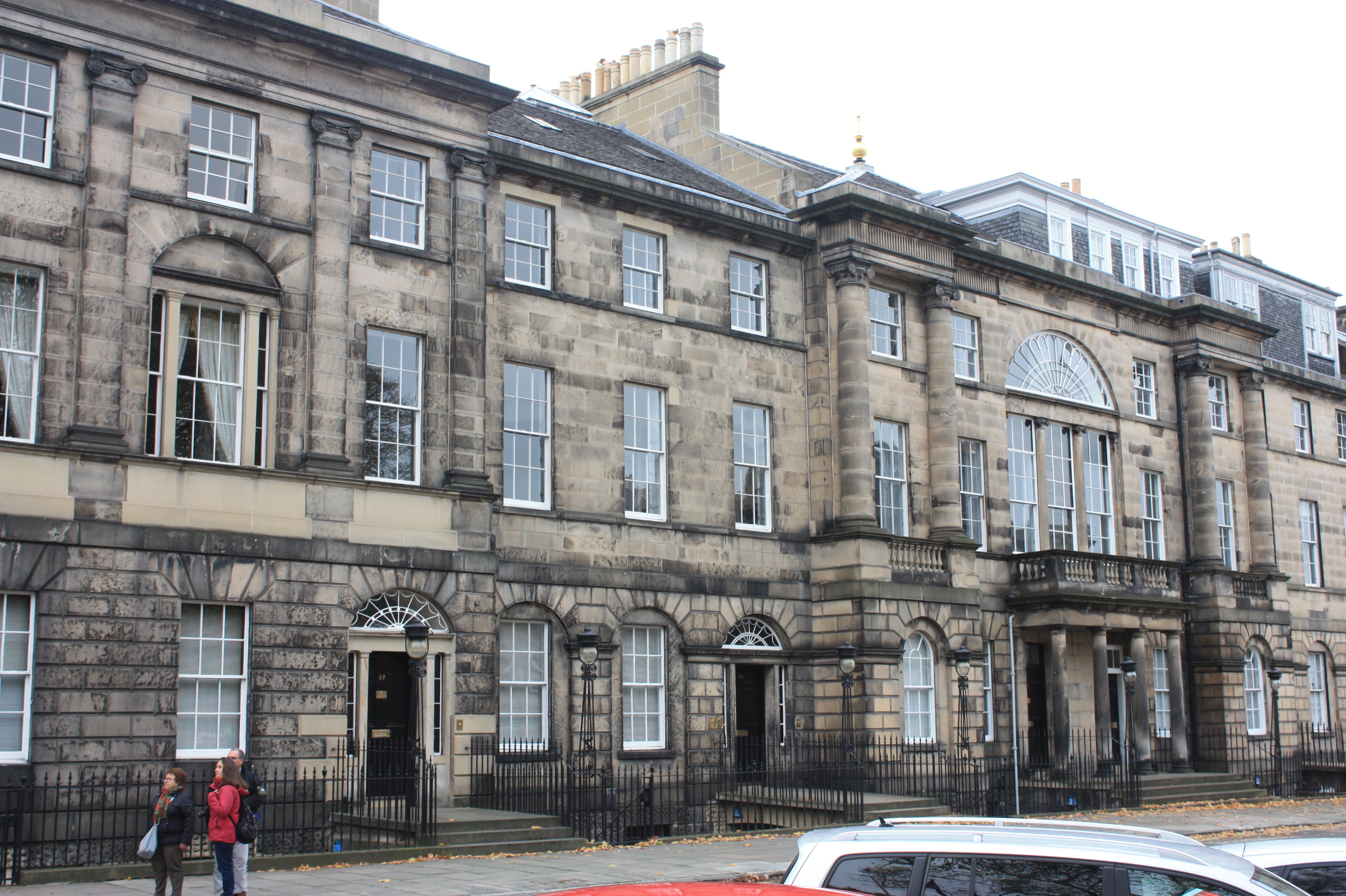
Patrick Heron Watson's home at 16 Charlotte Square, Edinburgh (centre)

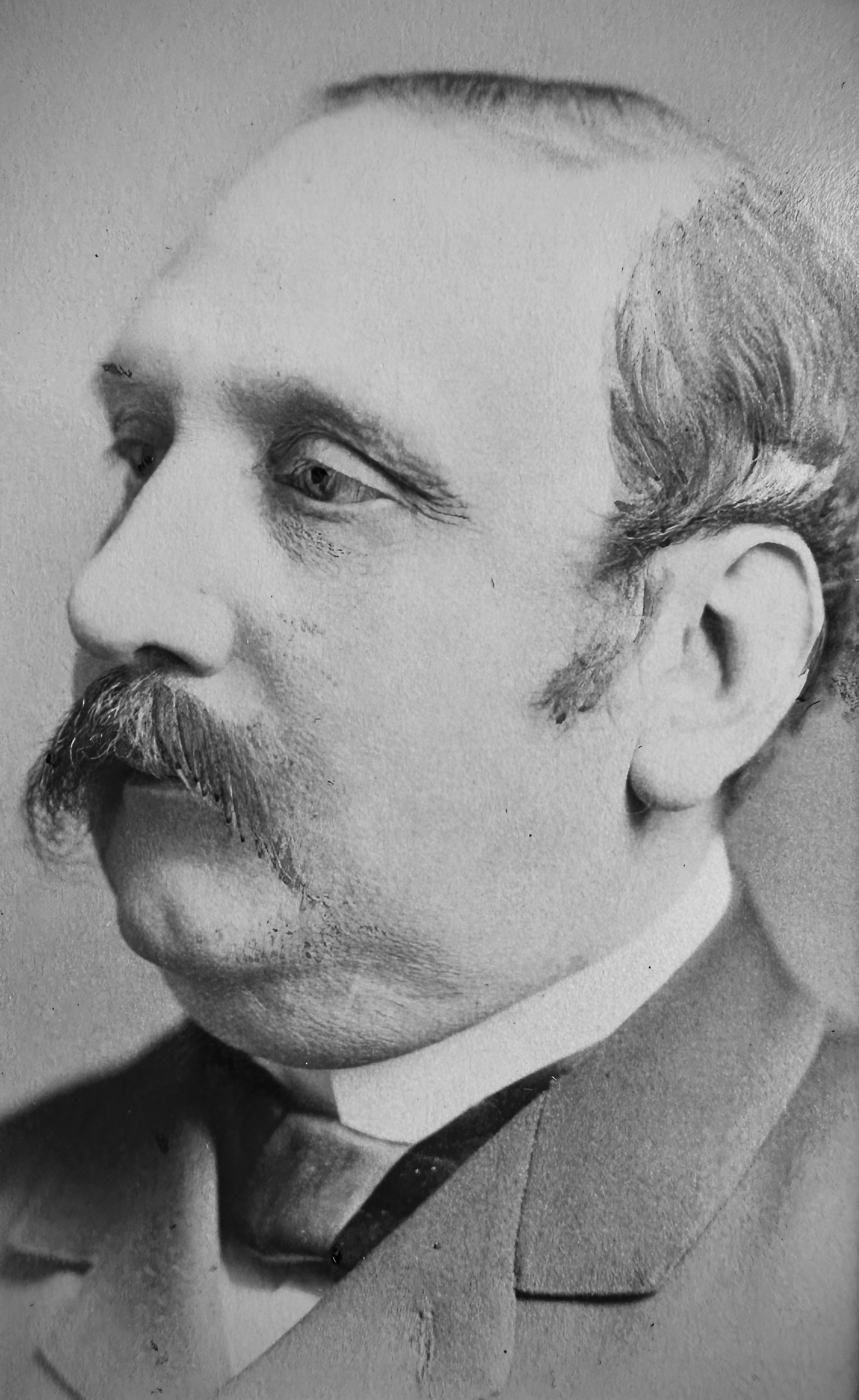
Watson in middle age

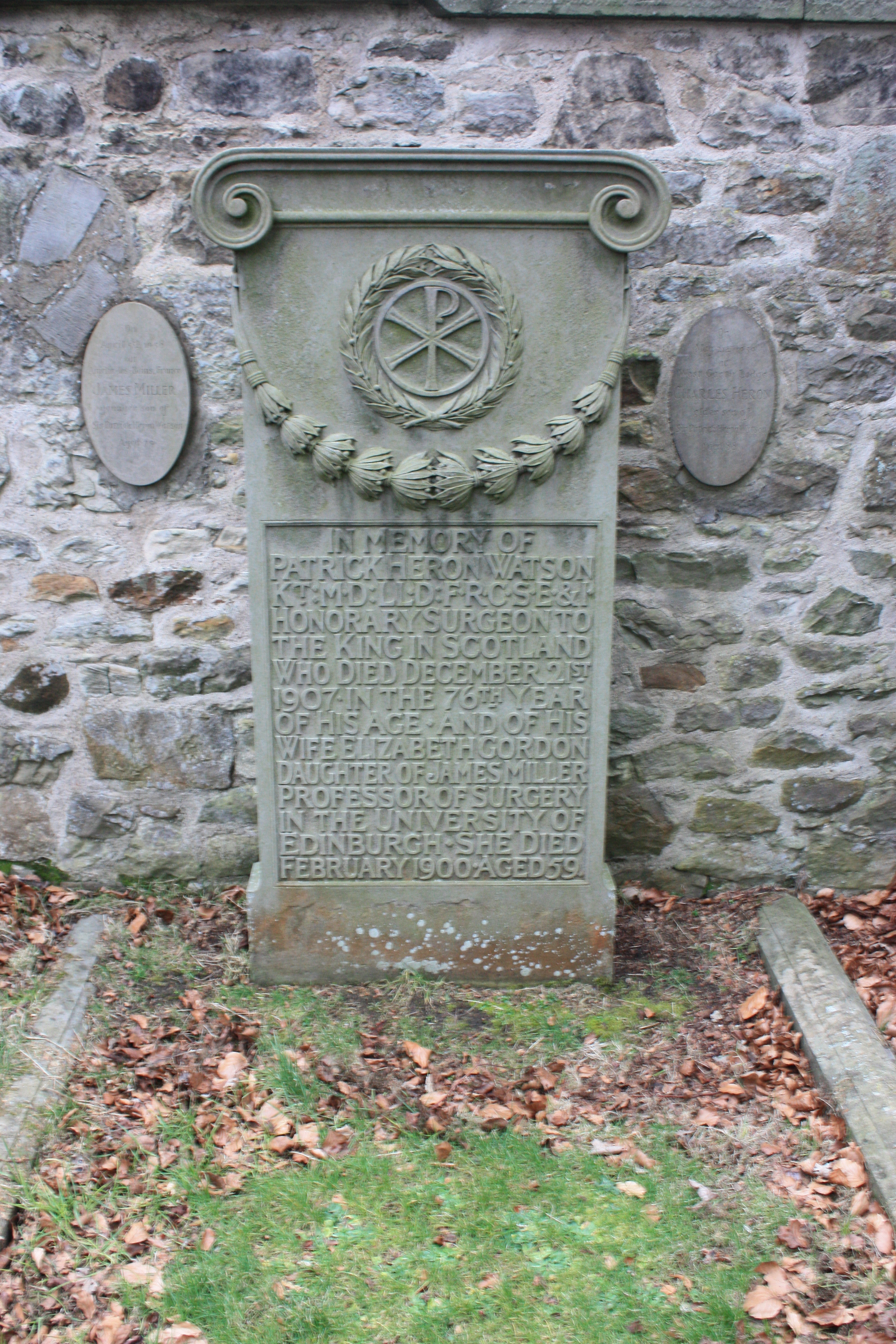
The grave of Patrick Heron Watson, Dean Cemetery, Edinburgh

Sir Patrick Heron Watson (5 January 1832 – 21 December 1907) was an eminent 19th-century Scottish surgeon and pioneer of anaesthetic development. He was associated with a number of surgical innovations including excision of the knee joint, excision of the thyroid and excision of the larynx for malignant disease. He was President of the Royal College of Surgeons of Edinburgh on two occasions, an unusual honour, and was the first President of the Edinburgh Dental Hospital. He was a great advocate of women training in medicine and surgery and did much to advance that cause.

== Early life ==
He was born in Edinburgh on 5 January 1832, the third of four sons of Rev Dr Charles Watson of Burntisland and Isabella Boog. His brothers were Rev Robert Boog Watson, Rev Charles Watson, and David Watson (a businessman). The family moved permanently to Edinburgh around 1840, living on Calton Hill: first at 19 Royal Terrace then in 1850 moving to 13 Carlton Terrace.

He was educated at Edinburgh Academy and then studied medicine at Edinburgh University.

During this time both Joseph Lister and John Beddoe were fellow students and friends. He graduated MD in 1853 with the thesis "On traumatic gangrene" and was elected Licentiate of the Royal College of Surgeons of Edinburgh. He served as house surgeon in the Royal Infirmary of Edinburgh under Professor James Spence. In July 1855 (whilst in the Crimea) he was elected FRCSEd.

== Crimea ==
In December 1854 he travelled south to Chatham Dockyard to enlist as an assistant surgeon in the Royal Artillery, specifically hoping to gain experience in military surgery, a standard requirement for Professorship. The Crimean War had just begun and intended to serve his country there. He left Chatham on 15 January 1855 with eight other surgeons, travelling to Crimea via Marseille and Valletta, their ship arriving at Constantinople on 26 January. His hospital was one of the three main hospitals serving the British troops: Scutari, just two miles from Constantinople and famed for its connection to Florence Nightingale. This he found nightmarish, and was pleased to be reposted to the hill hospital at Koolalee. This, however, had a far higher mortality rate, running at around 25%. On 11 April he reported his first bout of typhus, and moved to a hotel in Tarabya to convalesce, returning to Koolalee in early May 1855. He determined to move to a field hospital, closer to the war itself in Crimea, and in June travelled to Balaklava, and from there to a field hospital called Castle Hospital where he began work on 25 June. Here seventy patients were treated, under an Irish doctor named Jephson. He enjoyed six weeks here before being posted to a forward field hospital attached to the Royal artillery near Karane. In August 1855 he had a severe attack of dysentery and on 13 August he was placed on a ship, Imperador, to carry him back to the hospital at Scutari.

As a strange coincidence, here he was able to share a room with his brother Robert who had also caught dysentery whilst serving as chaplain with the Highland Brigade. Florence Nightingale wrote him a letter of apology as she was unable to help him due to her own illness at the time. He spent 4 weeks being treated but made little progress. He was placed on the ship the Earl of Shaftesbury to be returned home. He stayed a month in Valletta in Malta en route. Then took the steamship Transit back to Portsmouth in England. On 19 October he reached London.

He thought he would be returned to the Crimea once well, but never returned.

== Later life ==
Watson completed his military service at Woolwich and Aldershot, continuing in his role of Surgeon to the Royal Artillery.

He recovered and returned to Edinburgh to teach surgery at the university, that department then being based at High School Yards. Although he had hoped to become Professor of Military Surgery that role was abandoned in 1856. He also lectured at the Edinburgh Extramural School of Medicine at Surgeons' Hall. In the Royal Infirmary he acted as assistant to the Professor of Surgery James Miller, whose daughter Elizabeth he married. On Miller's death Heron Watson took on his father-in-law's large and lucrative practice.

In 1857 Watson was elected a member of the Harveian Society of Edinburgh and served as president in 1885.

In 1860, over and above his academic role, he took on the role of assistant surgeon at the Edinburgh Royal Infirmary. In 1860 he was also elected to the Aesculapian Club. In 1863 he was promoted to full surgeon, a role he then held for 15 years. During this time, he was one of Arthur Conan Doyle's teachers along with Joseph Bell, who ultimately became the inspirations for Dr. John Watson and Sherlock Holmes, respectively.

From 1865 to 1904 he was also a surgeon at Chalmers Hospital in Edinburgh (just west of the Royal Infirmary).

In the admission period of autumn 1870 he was one of the first to permit women to attend his extra mural classes in surgery. He stood alone in this role for sixteen years until his pupil, Sophia Jex-Blake, opened a college specifically for women.

In 1877 he stood for the chair of Clinical Surgery in Edinburgh University, but was beaten (alleged due to his opposition to specialisation) by Thomas Annandale. Nevertheless, he holds an important part in the history of surgery, making advances both in thyroid excision, excision of the knee joint, amputation and in abdominal operations. However, as with many contemporaries he was not a follower of his former student companion, Joseph Lister's use of antiseptic, and as a result, many simple procedures ended in failure.

In 1879 he helped to found the Edinburgh Dental Hospital, also being one of its directors. Here, too, he encouraged female students to join, with Lillian Lindsay becoming the first woman to graduate in Dentistry in the UK (1895). He also had long-running disputes with other Edinburgh medical figures, such as Henry Littlejohn.

He was elected President of the Royal College of Surgeons of Edinburgh in 1878 and again in 1905. On the latter occasion this was to enable him to be President during the College's quatercentenary celebrations, a sign of the esteem in which he was held by the Fellows.

He was Honorary Surgeon in Scotland, both to Queen Victoria and King Edward VII. He was knighted by the latter in 1903.

After a six-month illness, he died at his home at 16 Charlotte Square, on 21 December 1907 and was buried in Dean Cemetery on the west side of Edinburgh.

His collection of pathological specimens was passed to the Royal College of Surgeons and now forms part of their collection.

== Family ==
In 1861 he married Elizabeth Gordon Miller, eldest daughter of his mentor, Prof James Miller (1812–1864). She died in Gotha, Germany, on 27 February 1900.

They had two sons: Charles Heron Watson FRCS (1871–1959) and James Miller Watson (1879–1958). They also had two daughters, one of whom, Penelope Gordon Watson, married the surgeon James Haig Ferguson FRSE.

His nephew was Charles Boog Watson FRSE.

== Awards and recognition ==
- Crimean Medal, Turkish Medal, Sardinian Medal, Volunteer Officers' Decoration (VD)
- Caballero of the Order of King Carlos III of Spain (1878)
- Member of the General Medical Council (1882)
- Honorary Doctor of Letters (LLD) from Edinburgh University (1884)
- Honorary Fellow of the Royal College of Surgeons (Ireland) (1887)
- Member of the University Commission (1889)
- Knighted by King Edward VII (1903)

In 1894 he was painted by Sir George Reid. This painting is held by the Royal College of Surgeons on Nicolson Street.

== Papers of note ==
see

- Modern Pathology and Treatment of Venereal Disease (1861)
- Excision of the Knee Joint (1867)
- The use of Nitrous Oxide as an Anaesthetic (1868)
- Excision of the Thyroid Gland (1873)
- Micro-organisms of the Mouth and the Relationship to Disease (1883)
- The inhalation of Gas and Ether (1898)
