= Robert Christison =

British toxicologist and physician (1797–1882)

Sir Robert Christison FRSE FRCSE FRCPE
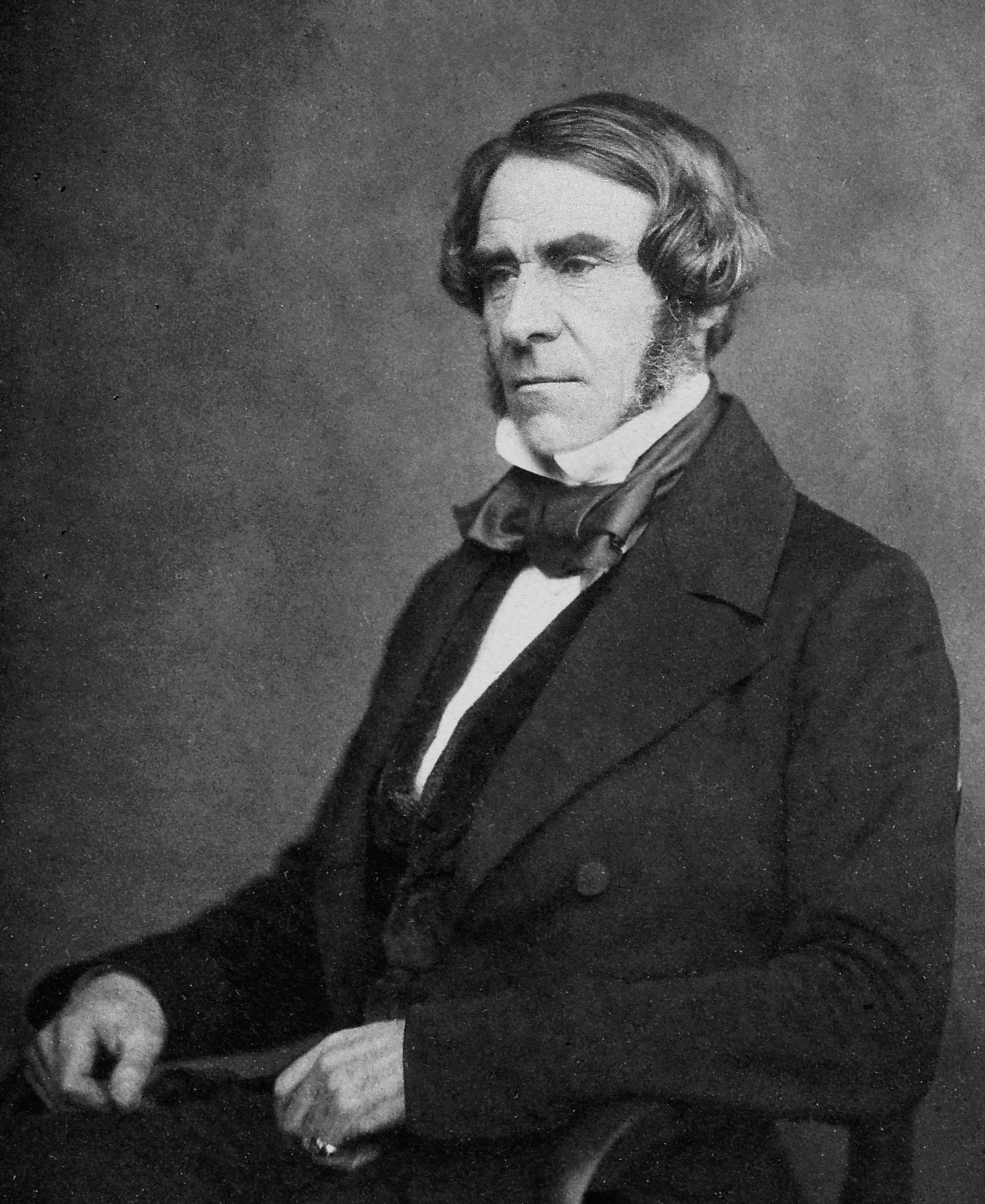
- Born: 18 July 1797; Edinburgh, Scotland
- Died: 27 January 1882 (aged 84); Edinburgh, Scotland
- Occupations: toxicologist; physician
- Known for: president of the Royal College of Physicians of Edinburgh; president of the British Medical Association

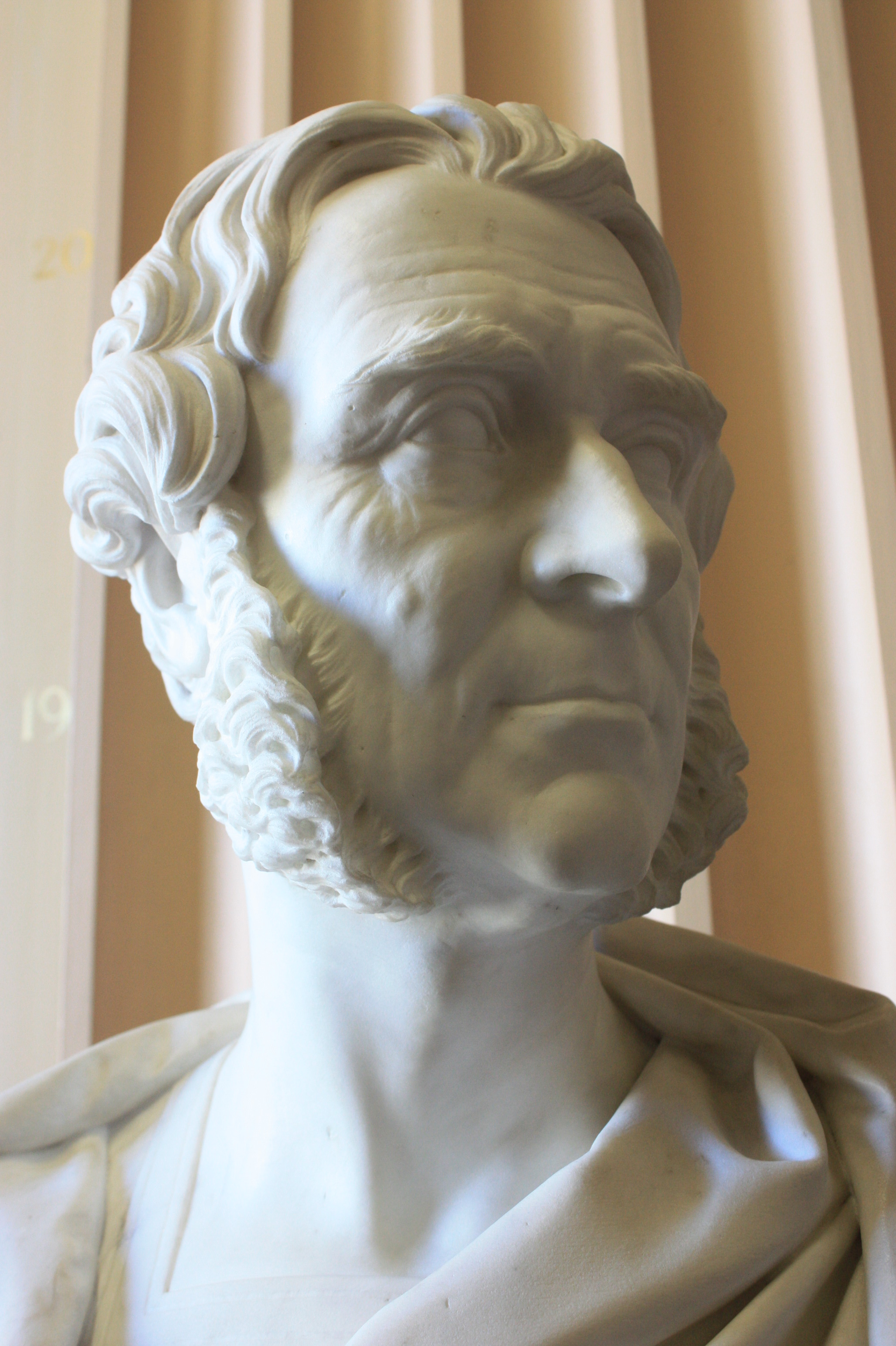
Bust of Robert Christison by William Brodie, 1871, Old College, University of Edinburgh

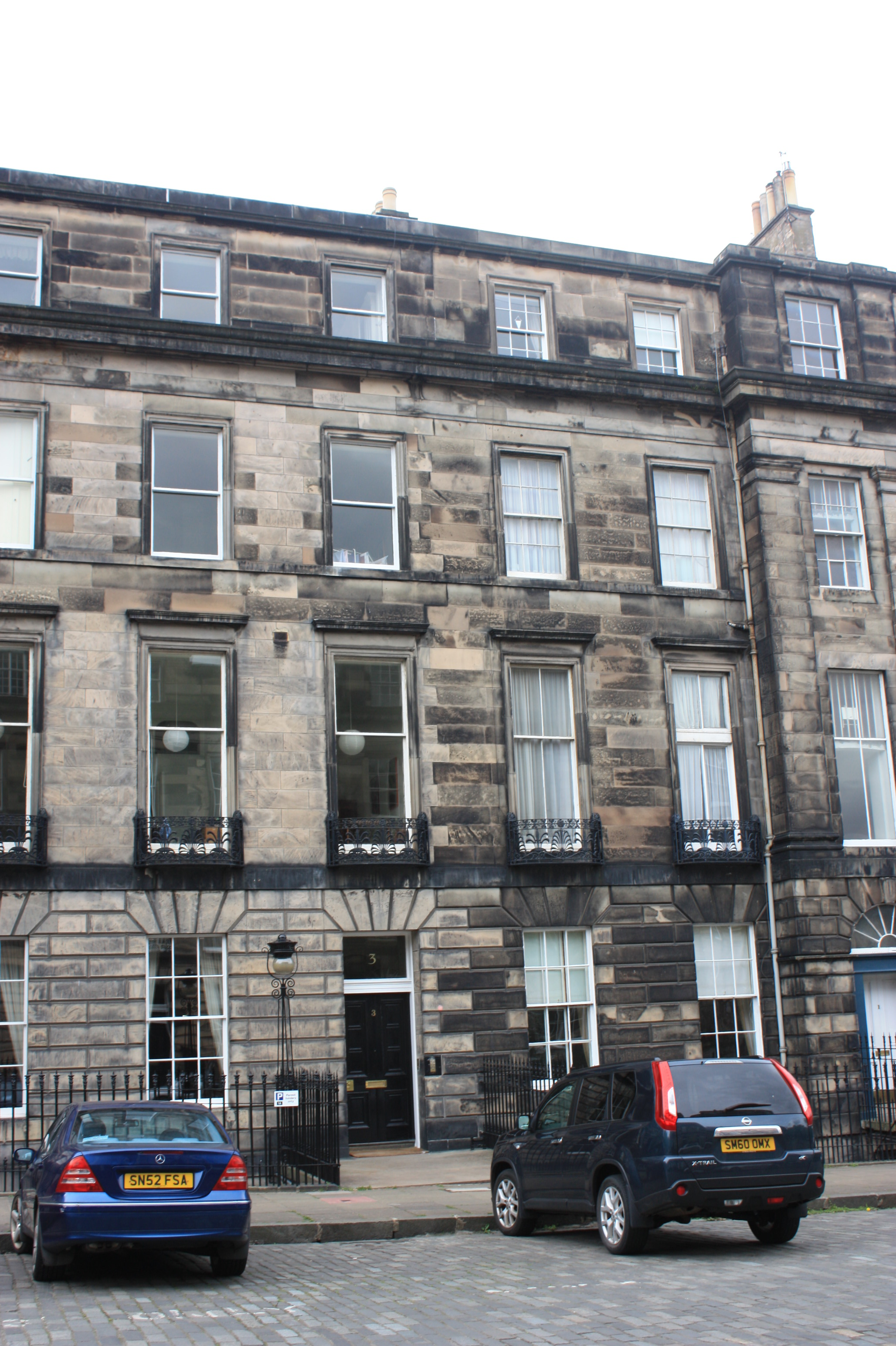
Christison's home at 3 Great Stuart Street, Edinburgh

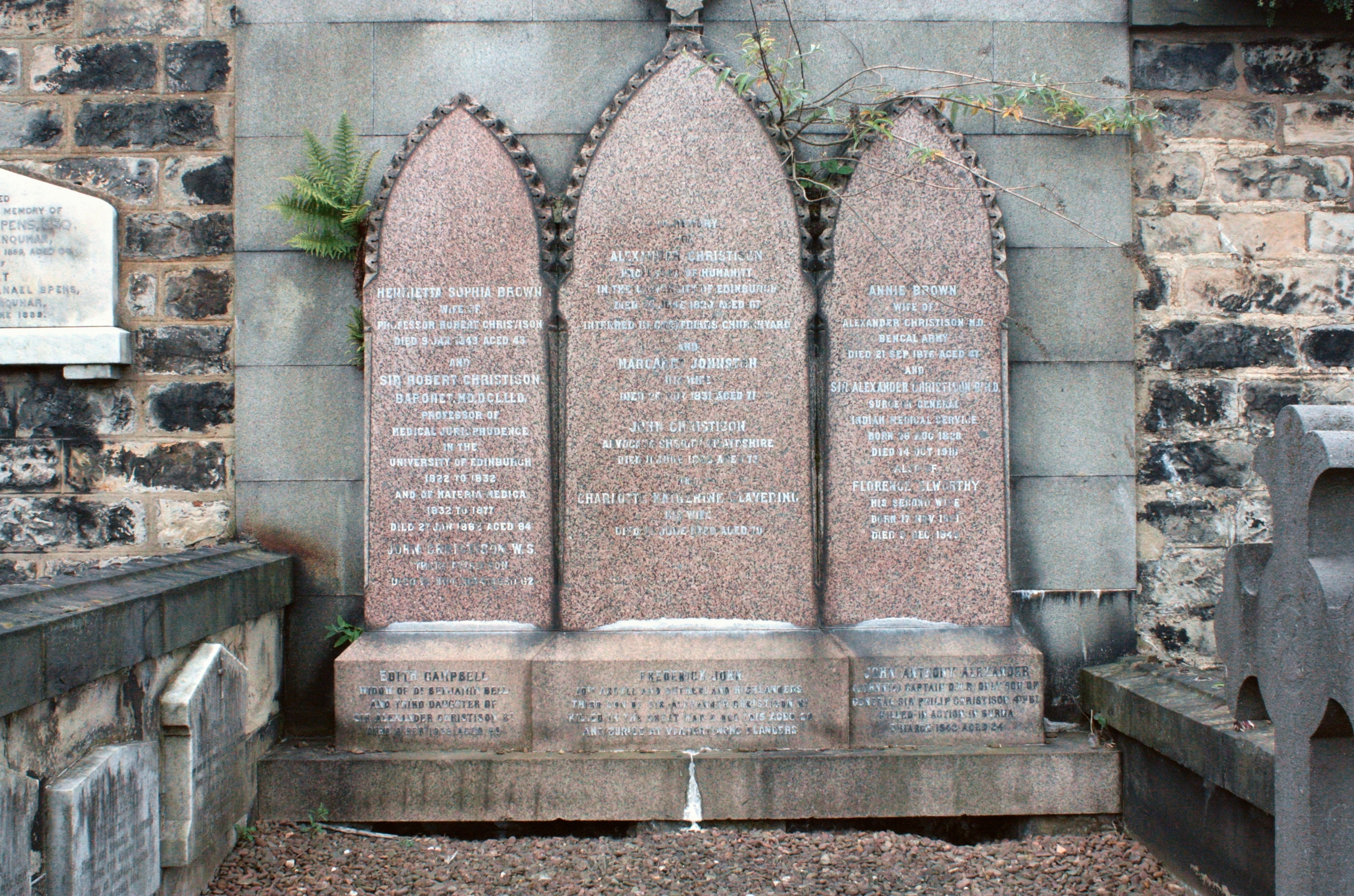
Christison grave, New Calton Cemetery

Sir Robert Christison, 1st Baronet, FRSE, FRCSE, FRCPE (18 July 1797 – 27 January 1882) was a Scottish toxicologist and physician who served as president of the Royal College of Physicians of Edinburgh (1838–40 and 1846–8) and as president of the British Medical Association (1875). He was the first person to describe renal anaemia.

== Life ==
Christison was born at 144 Nicolson Street in Edinburgh, the son of Margaret Johnstone and Alexander Christison FRSE (1753–1820). He was a twin, his elder brother (by a few minutes) was later Rev. Alexander Christison (1797–1874). He attended the Royal High School before studying medicine at University of Edinburgh, graduating in 1819. At this time the family were living at 4 Argyll Square.

He then spent a short time in London, studying under John Abernethy and Sir William Lawrence, and in Paris, where he learned analytical chemistry from Pierre Robiquet and toxicology from Mathieu Orfila. In 1822 he returned to Edinburgh as professor of medical jurisprudence and set to work to organise the study of his subject on a sound basis. He became an authority on poisons, and his treatise on them was published in 1829. In the course of his research he undertook experiments on himself such as taking large doses of calabar bean (physostigmine). In 1827, he was appointed physician-in-ordinary to the Royal Infirmary of Edinburgh, a position he held until 1832. His attainments in medical jurisprudence and toxicology procured him the appointment, in 1829, of medical officer to the Crown in Scotland. From that time until 1866 he was called as a witness in many celebrated criminal cases, including the Burke and Hare murders.

In 1832, Christison gave up the chair of medical jurisprudence and accepted that of medicine and therapeutics, which he held until 1877; at the same time he became professor of clinical medicine, and continued in that capacity until 1855. At this time his address is listed as 3 Great Stuart Street on the Moray Estate, a large Georgian townhouse in the west end of Edinburgh, a desirable area.

His fame as a toxicologist and medical jurist, together with his work on the pathology of the kidneys and on fevers, secured him a large private practice, and he succeeded to a fair share of the honors that commonly attend the successful physician, being appointed physician to Queen Victoria in 1848 and receiving a baronetcy in 1871. Among the books which he published were a treatise on Granular Degeneration of the Kidneys (1839), and a Commentary on the Pharmacopoeias of Great Britain (1842).

In 1822 Christison was elected a member of the Harveian Society of Edinburgh and served as President in 1837. In 1841, he was elected as a member of the American Philosophical Society.

Christison was a strong opposer of women in the field of medicine, a view in Edinburgh eventually undermined by his colleague, Patrick Heron Watson's admission of women students to his extra mural surgery classes. A further (still controversial) proposal was his creation of a system of lethal injection (through the discovery of physostigmine in 1846) for human execution, in place of hanging. For various reasons, although this seems to pre-date its introduction into American use by 40 years, the method never appealed to British sensibilities.

Christison served as Vice President of the Royal Society of Edinburgh 1845–1868 and was its President from 1868 to 1873.

From 1875 to 1881, he served as a vice-president of the Cockburn Association, a newly established campaigning conservationist group in Edinburgh.

Christison, who retained remarkable physical vigour and activity until old age, died at home, 40 Moray Place in Edinburgh on 27 January 1882. He is buried in New Calton Cemetery in a family plot created by his father, Alexander Christison (who is buried in Greyfriars Kirkyard and only memorialised here), on one of the south-facing terraces.

== Opposition to women doctors ==
Christison was unequivocally opposed to women studying medicine and qualifying as doctors, and led the campaign against Sophia Jex-Blake and the Edinburgh Seven. He was an influential figure both within the University and in the wider civic life of Edinburgh, and his opinion was held in high regard.

When the Senatus met on 9 April 1870 to discuss the issue of Edith Pechey's right to a Hope Scholarship having come top of the class in the chemistry exam, he made his opinions clear.

He shared the view of many of his contemporaries that nature intended women to be mothers and housekeepers, and lacked the intellectual ability and stamina of men. Consequently, if women were to enter any learned profession in significant numbers they would lower its standards.

His influence was largely responsible for the eventual decision taken by the University not to allow the women to graduate.

James Stansfeld, who had been closely associated with the London campaign (following the failure of the Edinburgh campaign) wrote, in his brief history of the events, in 1877:

″Dr Sophia Jex-Blake has made the greatest of all contributions to the end attained. I do not say that she has been the ultimate cause of success. The ultimate cause has been simply this, that the time was at hand. It is one of the lessons of the history of progress that when the time for reform has come you cannot resist it, though if you make the attempt, what you may do is to widen its character or precipitate its advent. Opponents, when the time has come, are not merely dragged at the chariot wheels of progress – they help to turn them. The strongest forces, whichever way it seems to work, does most to aid. The forces of greatest concentration here have been, in my view, on the one hand the Edinburgh University led by Sir Robert Christison, on the other the women claimants led by Dr Sophia Jex-Blake.″

== Family ==
On 20 October 1827 he and Henrietta Sophia Brown (1799–1843) were married and together they had three sons, including Sir Alexander Christison, who inherited the baronetcy, and David Christison (1830–1912).

== Works ==
- A Dispensatory, or Commentary on the Pharmacopoeias of Great Britain : comprising the natural History, Description, Chemistry, Pharmacy, Actions, Uses, and Doses of the Articles of the Materia Medica.
  - 2nd Ed. with 213 Ill. / by R. Eglesfeld Griffith. Philadelphia : Lea & Blanchard, 1848. Digital edition by the University and State Library Düsseldorf

== See also ==
- Douglas Maclagan
- Christison baronets

Baronetage of the United Kingdom
New creation	Baronet (of Moray Place); 1871–1882	Succeeded by Alexander Christison
