= Robert Christison (pastoralist) =

Australian pastoralist

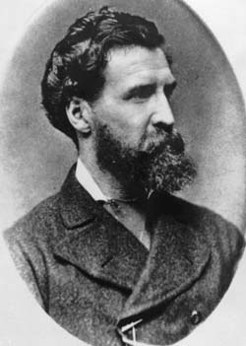
- Born: 8 January 1837; Foulden, Scottish Borders
- Died: 25 October 1915 (aged 78); Burwell, Lincolnshire
- Occupation: pastoralist

Robert Christison (8 January 1837 – 25 October 1915) was a pastoralist in Australia.

== Life ==
Christison was born in Foulden, Berwickshire, Scotland. His uncle was Sir Robert Christison known for his opposition to women being educated.

Christison migrated to Victoria in 1852 along with his brother, Tom. Initially Christison worked in Werribee, Victoria for the Chirnside brothers. He was a fine horseman and an amateur jockey. Christison thought of joining the Burke and Wills expedition but instead explored the interior with an Aboriginal friend named Barney. He shipped horses and himself to Bowen in northern Queensland. From there he travelled inland for an area discovered by William Landsborough which was regarded as good sheep country. Christison grazed sheep there and, later, cattle. In 1870 he drove 7000 sheep over 1,500 miles (2,400 km) to Victoria.

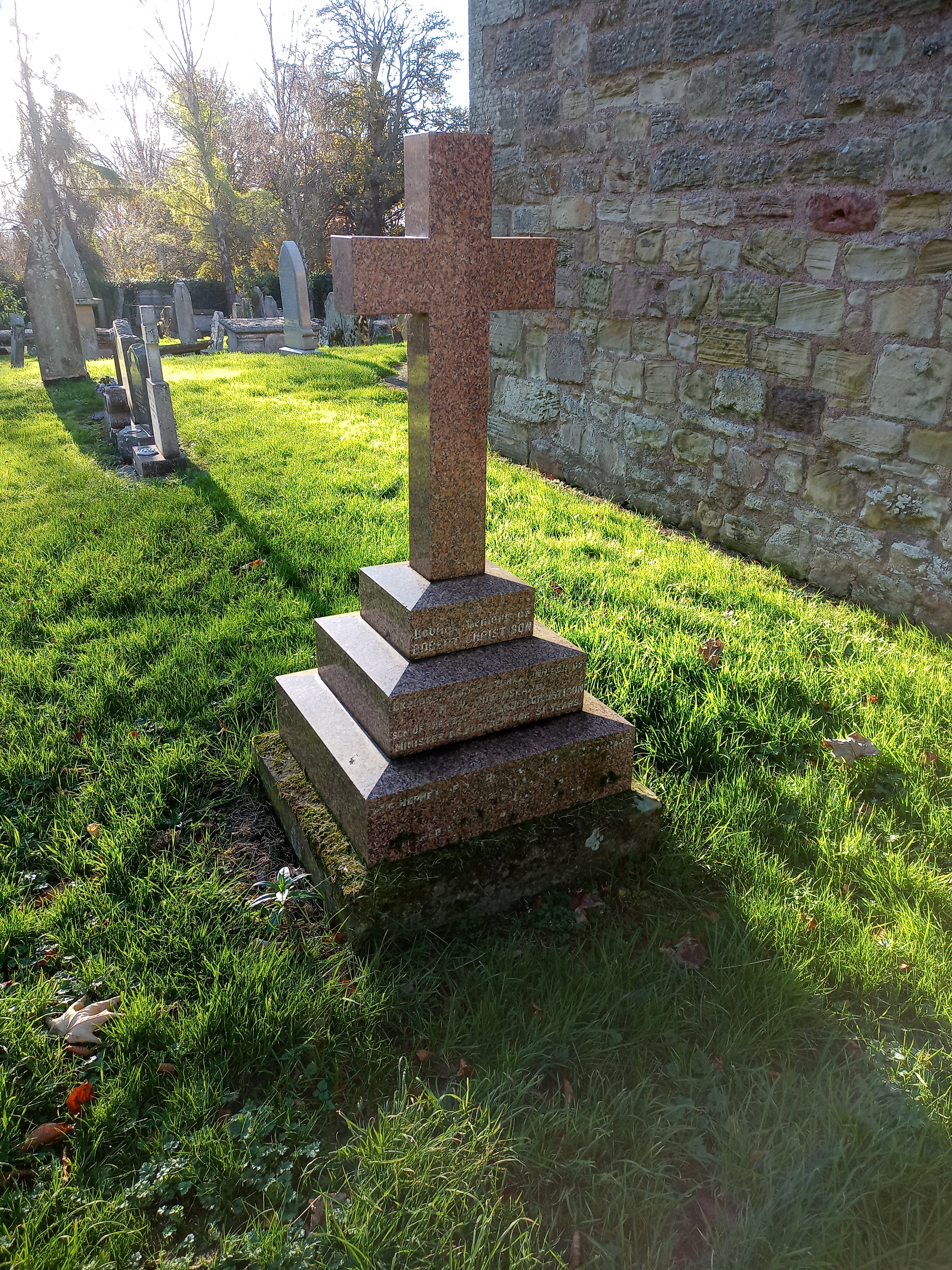
Robert Christison's grave by hus father's church in Foulden

In 1910, Christison rejoined his family after selling his interests. He died in Burrell Park in Lincolnshire in 1915. He is buried in Foulden.
