= UHI =

UHI may refer to:

- Uganda Heart Institute, in Kampala, Uganda
- Universal Handy Interface from Motorola, an interface for mobile phone use in Mercedes-Benz cars
- University of the Highlands and Islands, formerly known as UHI Millennium Institute, in Scotland
  - UHI Archaeology Institute
  - UHI North, West and Hebrides
  - UHI Orkney
  - UHI Perth
  - UHI West Highland College
- Urban heat island, in climatology
- U-Haul U-Haul International, a US moving company
- An uhi is also the name for a tool used in tā moko, traditional Māori tattoo-like skin marking
