= Dunstaffnage =

Dunstaffnage may refer to the following places in Scotland:

- Dunbeg, formerly known as Dunstaffnage
- Dunstaffnage Castle
