= Environmental Research Institute =

Nonprofit organization in United Kingdom

The Environmental Research Institute (ERI) is a research institute based in the town centre of Thurso, Scotland. It is a part of North Highland College, which is one of the University of the Highlands and Islands' partners (UHI). The institute was officially opened on 9 May 2000 by Jamie Stone MSP. The project was funded by The European Regional Development Fund and the Millennium Commission. The ERI is also involved in the development and delivery of Master's and Ph.D. programmes. The institute specifically works on environmental contamination and ecological health, renewable energy and the environment, and carbon, water, climate studies.
