= MHI =

MHI may refer to:

- Mitsubishi Heavy Industries, Tokyo, Japan
- Montreal Heart Institute
- Multi-Handset Interface, US name for Motorola Universal Handy Interface
- Other name of Concussion its "mild head injury"
