= Calum Maclean =

Calum Maclean may refer to:

- Calum Maclean (folklorist)
- Calum Maclean (broadcaster)
