= Lews Castle College =

Coordinates: 58°12′47″N 6°23′48″W

UHI North, West and Hebrides
- A Tuath, An Iar, is Innse Gaal
- Type: College
- Established: 1953
- Affiliations: University of the Highlands and Islands,
- Location: Stornoway, Scotland
- Website: www.lews.uhi.ac.uk

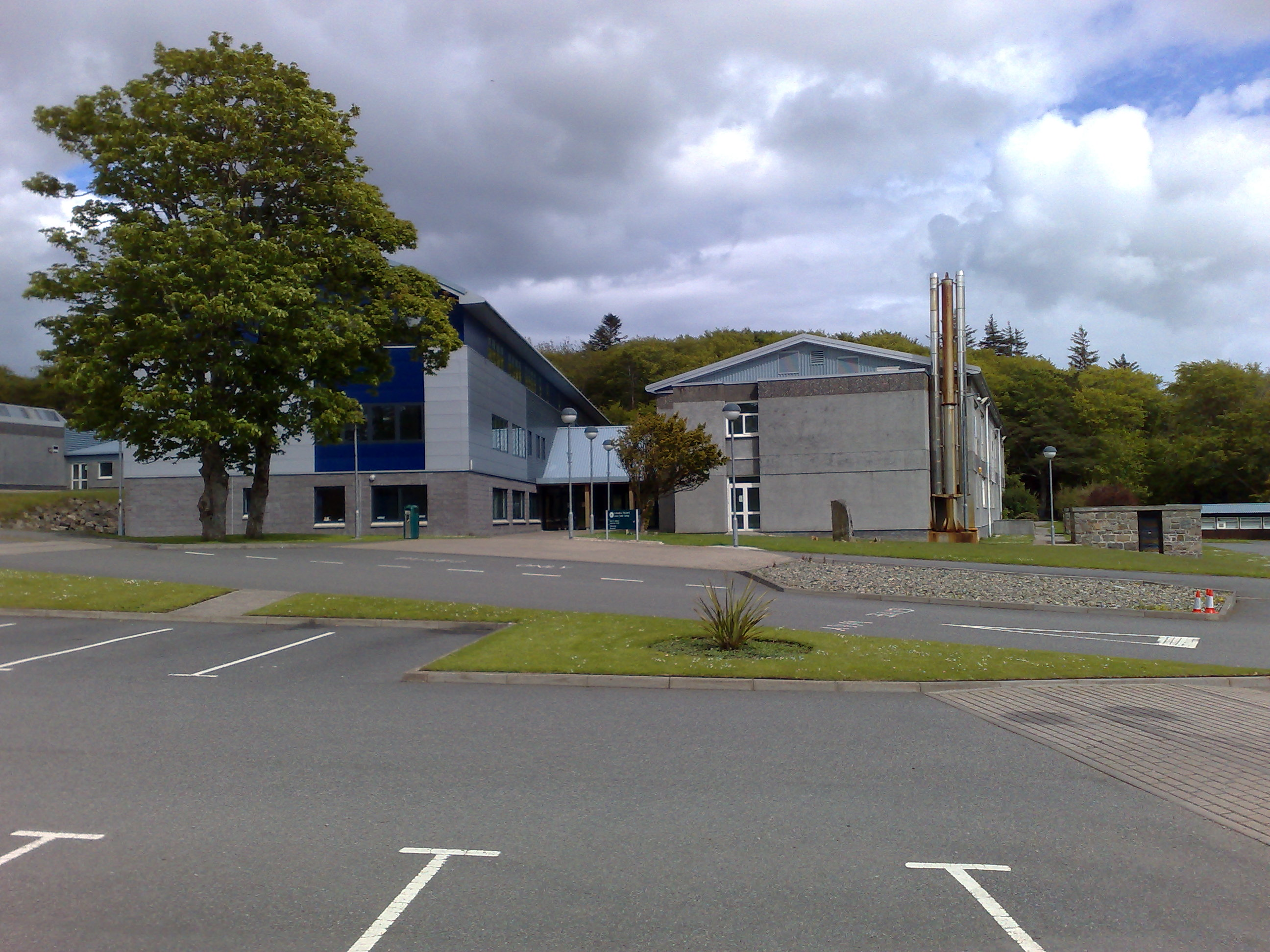

UHI North, West and Hebrides (formerly UHI Outer Hebrides and Lews Castle College) (Scottish Gaelic: Colaisde a' Chaisteil [ˈkʰɔl̪ˠɪʃtʲə ə ˈxaʃtʰal], meaning literally "College of the Castle") is a further and higher education college in the Western Isles of Scotland. The main campus is in the grounds of Lews Castle, Stornoway. The college also has two learning centres in Benbecula and Barra. The college is part of the University of the Highlands and Islands.

The college opened in September 1953; its first principal was Colonel John Macsween. It was originally run by the local authority. It had 83 students and 9 full-time faculty members. In 1993, the college became an independent entity under the Further and Higher Education (Scotland) Act 1992. Lews Castle was originally used as accommodation for the students, but it is currently needing renovation.

In December 2012, the college had 2,700 students enrolled in 150 full-time, part-time and online courses, representing nine different nationalities, and employed 130 staff.

The college has a subsidiary company, Lews Castle College (Trading) Limited, which provides Gaelic translation services.

== Merchant navy training ==
Lews Castle College conducts several courses for the seagoing merchant navy personnel both long and short term:

- Access to Merchant Navy (1 year full-time)
- Efficient Deck Hand, GMDSS & STCW Courses (short courses)

== Notable alumni ==
- Anne Lundon, broadcaster
