= Scottish Association for Marine Science =

Scottish oceanographic society and research organization

Coordinates: 56.45115°N 5.440741°W

- SAMS
- Type: Research institute University
- Established: 1884
- Academic staff: 55
- Administrative staff: 110
- Students: 240
- Undergraduates: 200
- Postgraduates: 40
- Doctoral students: 30
- Location: Oban, Argyll, Scotland
- Campus: Dunbeg
- Director: Prof NJP Owens
- Affiliations: UHI; UNU; NERC; MASTS
- Website: www.sams.ac.uk

The Scottish Association for Marine Science (SAMS) is the UK's oldest ocean research and education charity (established 1884) based near Oban, Argyll, on the European Marine Science Park. It is a founding partner of the University of the Highlands and Islands teaching a range of undergraduate and postgraduate degrees related to the marine environment. It is also an associate institute of the United Nations University.

== History ==
The Association was founded in 1884 by Sir John Murray following the Challenger expedition. The Scottish Marine Station, as it was then known, was established in Granton, outside Edinburgh and was the first marine research station in Scotland. It grew quickly and over the next 10 years began a gradual transfer of activities to Millport on the Isle of Cumbrae on the west coast. In 1894, a local committee undertook fundraising in order to construct a building onshore that was completed in 1897. In 1901 the committee transformed itself into the Marine Biological Association of the West of Scotland by adopting a formal constitution. In 1914 the association was incorporated as a not-for-profit company and renamed the Scottish Marine Biological Association.

After 80 years of investigations of the Firth of Clyde area and an island location, the Association relocated to the mainland in 1967 and built new facilities near Oban where it has easy access to a variety of oceanographic environments. In 1992 the Association was renamed to its current name, the Scottish Association for Marine Science.

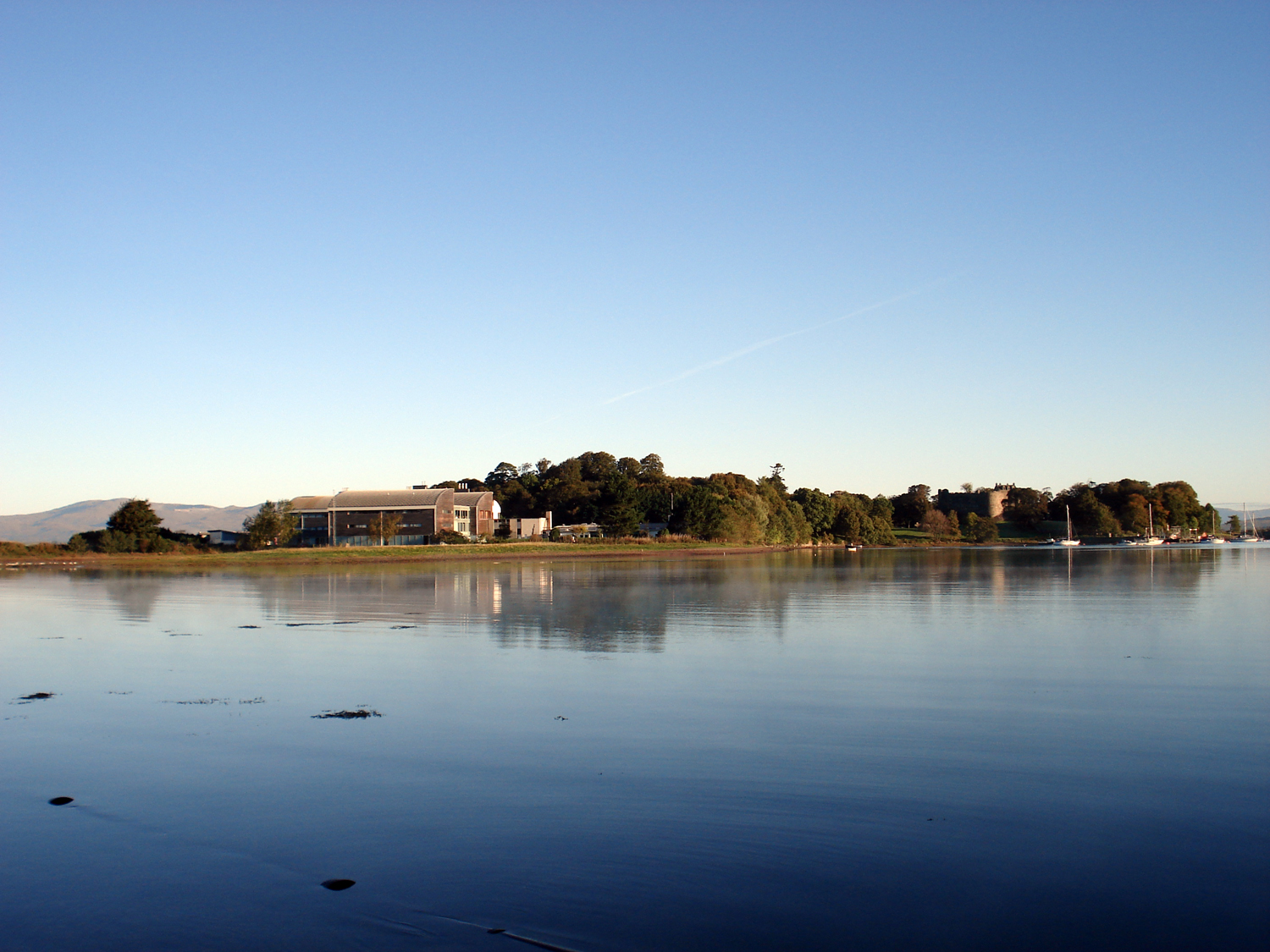
SAMS Laboratory in 2007

The research laboratories were rebuilt and re-equipped in 2004 and new teaching facilities were added in 2010. The Ocean Explorer Centre, at Dunbeg, allows visitors to learn about the marine environment and some of the research going on at SAMS.

In 2014 the Ocean Explorer Centre was opened by Michael Russell MSP, then Scottish Cabinet Secretary for Education and Lifelong Learning, to serve as a visitor and outreach facility for SAMS.

== Research ==
SAMS science is organised in three research areas:

- Discovery of the physical, chemical, geological and biological processes that drive the marine system
- Describing and quantifying how the coastal environment responds to human-made pressures such as climate change, habitat destruction, pollution and resource overexploitation and to work with society on developing and testing mitigation and adaptation measures
- Developing a sustainable blue economy to promote the use of the marine environment without degrading its health and productivity

SAMS works with staff from different disciplines, including physicists, mathematicians, biologists, geologists, chemists, social scientists, computer scientists, technologists, engineers, and communicators.

In addition to marine research, in the fields of marine processes and climate change, renewable energy, the Arctic, marine prosperity and sustainability, and mining impacts, the institute has a commercial branch and an education department.

In 2024 Professor Andrew Sweetman from SAMS was lead-author on a Nature Geoscience communication that provided the first evidence for dark oxygen production in the deep sea.

== Commercial activities ==
SAMS set up its first commercial subsidiary in 2002. SAMS Enterprise delivers specialist marine consultancy and survey services to industries, including aquaculture, renewable energy, marine mining, oil and gas (decommissioning), seafood security, and marine biotechnology. The company also manufactures devices for autonomous snow and ice measurements for reliable monitoring in extreme and inaccessible locations, a software model predicting the impact of fishfarm discharges on the seabed and products and services supporting seaweed farmers.

== Facilities ==
=== Robotics facilities ===
SAMS' robotics facilities uses flying, surface and diving robots to work on academic, regulatory and commercial projects, such as aerial mapping, surface fluxes and the properties of deep water. The Scientific Robotics Academy provides training, testing and monitoring to assess and monitor the environment.

=== Culture Collection of Algae and Protozoa ===
The CCAP is the largest collection of algae and protists in Europe. It supports SAMS' research, eg on algal diseases.

== Education ==
SAMS offers undergraduate and postgraduate marine science programmes, including:

- Marine Science BSc (Hons)
- Marine Science with Marine Biology BSc (Hons)
- Marine Science with Arctic Studies BSc (Hons)
- Marine Science with Oceanography & Marine Robotics BSc (Hons)
- Applied Marine Science MSci
- Aquaculture, Environment and Society (ACES) Joint Masters (Erasmus Mundus)
- Marine Science MRes
- Doctorate studies

== Academic partnerships ==
SAMS is an academic partner of the University of the Highlands and Islands. It is also a member of the Marine Alliance for Science and Technology for Scotland (MASTS).

Deputy Director Professor Mark Inall was the director of the Scottish Alliance for Geoscience, Environment and Society (SAGES) until 2023; in 2024, he was appointed as Chief Scientific Adviser of the Scottish Government’s Marine Directorate.
