= James Ellsmoor =

Entrepreneur and sustainability expert

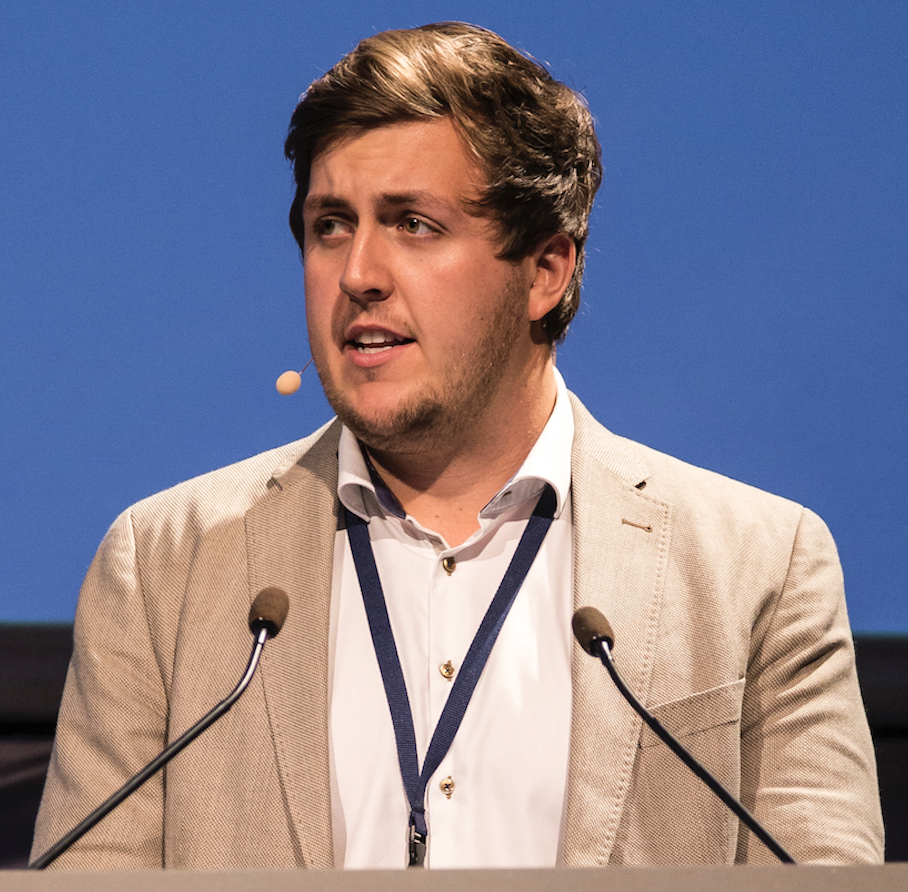
- Education: University of North Carolina at Chapel Hill; University of the Highlands and Islands
- Occupation: Entrepreneur
- Website: www.jellsmoor.com

James Ellsmoor is a writer, entrepreneur and sustainability expert, who has lived and worked in the Caribbean, United States and Colombia. He now lives in Lisbon, Portugal. He is a graduate of the Institute for Northern Studies at the University of the Highlands and Islands, and was awarded the university's Alumnus of the Year in 2020. In 2017 he was recognised on the Forbes 30 under 30: Energy list.

== Career ==
After graduating from the University of North Carolina at Chapel Hill with a Bachelor's degree in Economics and Geography, he gained an MLitt Master's degree in Island Studies from the Institute for Northern Studies at the University of the Highlands and Islands in 2018.

== Island Innovation ==
He is co-founder and CEO of Island Innovation, a social enterprise and digital media company which runs the Virtual Island Summit, promoting cross-sector collaboration and the sharing of best practice in sustainable development. Island Innovation originally started as a newsletter collating stories about sustainable development on islands across the world, and developed into a social enterprise running virtual events, working with remote islands around the world, linking them together to encourage sustainable development. It has its own online community and works on project promotion and environmental consultancy, bringing together the private sector, government, NGOs and academia with the goal of advancing innovation for sustainability in island communities across the world. The company has also worked with the Strathclyde Centre for Environmental Law and Governance, based at the University of Strathclyde, on a study of islands across the world in 2020.

== Solar Head of State ==
He is co-founder and Director of Solar Head of State, an international non-profit which works with governments across the Caribbean and Pacific Islands raising awareness of renewable energy through high-profile solar installations on governmental buildings. The company was modelled on a campaign by US President Jimmy Carter, who installed solar water heaters on the White House to conserve energy and set an example to the American public at the time of an international energy crisis.
