= UHI North, West and Hebrides =

Scottish College

- A Tuath, An Iar, is Innse Gaal
- Type: College
- Established: 2023
- Location: Scotland
- Affiliations: University of the Highlands and Islands,
- Website: www.nwh.uhi.ac.uk

UHI North, West and Hebrides (Scottish Gaelic: A Tuath, An Iar, is Innse Gaal) provides further and higher education in the north and west of Scotland through a network of learning centres and by distance learning. It is a constituent college of the University of the Highlands and Islands.

On 1 August 2023., North Highland College, Lews Castle College and West Highland College merged to form UHI North, West and Hebrides.

The new college seeks to be a “driver of change, supporting economic growth in our rural and island communities” according to Principal Lydia Rohmer.

== History ==
In early 2021, the boards of management at North Highland College (UHI North Highland), West Highland College (UHI West Highland) and Lews Castle College (UHI Outer Hebrides) commissioned a review into their long-term strategic future. After a ten-week public consultation, the merger was approved by the college boards in November 2022. The name "UHI North, West and Hebrides" was agreed in December 2022. The Scottish Government approved the merger in July 2023, after a formal consultation process
