= Alexander Garden (poet) =

Scottish poet c. 1585 – c. 1642

Alexander Garden or Gardyne (c. 1585 – c. 1642) was a Scottish poet from Aberdeenshire.

== Life and works ==
He is believed to have graduated from Marischal College before 1609 when a work of his was published calling him Mr., implying he had the degree of MA. This book was A Garden of Grave and Godlie Flowers: a collection of poems, elegies and prayers in praise of King James, other public figures and also friends. His The Theatre of the Scottish Kings (c. 1625, but started in 1612) and A Theatre of Scottish Worthies are a series of short poems about every Scottish king from Fergus I on, and about various warriors and knights. He also wrote The Lyf, Doings and Deathe of William Elphinstoun (1619) based on a Latin work by Hector Boece about Bishop Elphinstone.

The first two of these books were published together in 1845 for the Abbotsford Club, the historical and literary society.

There are records of Garden as an advocate in 1633, and again in 1638 when he was one of a committee appointed to choose a new sub-principal sheriff. It used to be thought that the poet died around 1634; but recently 1642 has been suggested as more likely.
