= North Highland College =

College in Scotland

Coordinates: 58.585742°N 3.534689°W

North Highland College UHI
- Type: College
- Established: 1959
- Affiliations: University of the Highlands and Islands,
- Principal: Debbie Murray
- Students: 8,000
- Location: Thurso, Scotland
- Website: www.northhighland.uhi.ac.uk

North Highland College (Scottish Gaelic: Colaiste na Gàidhealtachd a Tuath) provides further education and higher education in the north of Scotland through a network of learning centres and by distance learning. It is a constituent college of the University of the Highlands and Islands.

== History ==
The college opened in 1959 and became an independent entity in 1993.

In July 2014, the college had 8,000 students enrolled in full-time and part-time courses, including more than 750 studying for university degrees.

The college has campuses in Thurso, Halkirk, Alness and Dornoch.

In August 2023, it merged to become UHI North, West and Hebrides.

== Thurso campus ==
=== Centre for Energy and Environment ===
The Centre for Energy and Environment building was designed by HRI Architects and completed in January 2011. It received a rating of excellent by BREEAM. and was awarded "best new building in the north region" at the Highlands and Islands Design Awards in 2012.

== Rural studies centre ==
The college has been offering equestrian courses since 1990. In September 2012 it has used a converted farm that combines stabling, classrooms and a purpose-built indoor arena. Dale Farm is a facility that is situated approximately six miles from the main campus in Thurso. The college also offers a gamekeeping and wildlife management course.

== Environmental Research Institute ==
Environmental Research Institute (ERI) is a centre for environmental research

== Centre for History ==
The centre in Dornoch opened in 2005. Since 2007 a number of degree courses have been offered that are centred on the history of the Highlands and Islands.

== Governance ==
The principal, Debbie Murray, took up the post in May 2021.
