= Evonium =

Purported lost city in Scotland

Evonium is a purported lost city in Scotland first described by Hector Boece in his 16th-century Scotorum Historiae. According to Boece, it hosted the coronation of forty kings and was located in the Lochaber area. Boece's translator John Bellenden substituted Dunstaffnage for Evonium which led to the belief that the Stone of Scone was once kept at Dunstaffnage Castle.
