= Dunstaffnage Castle =

Castle in Argyll and Bute, Scotland

- Near Dunbeg, Argyll and Bute, Scotland; NM882344
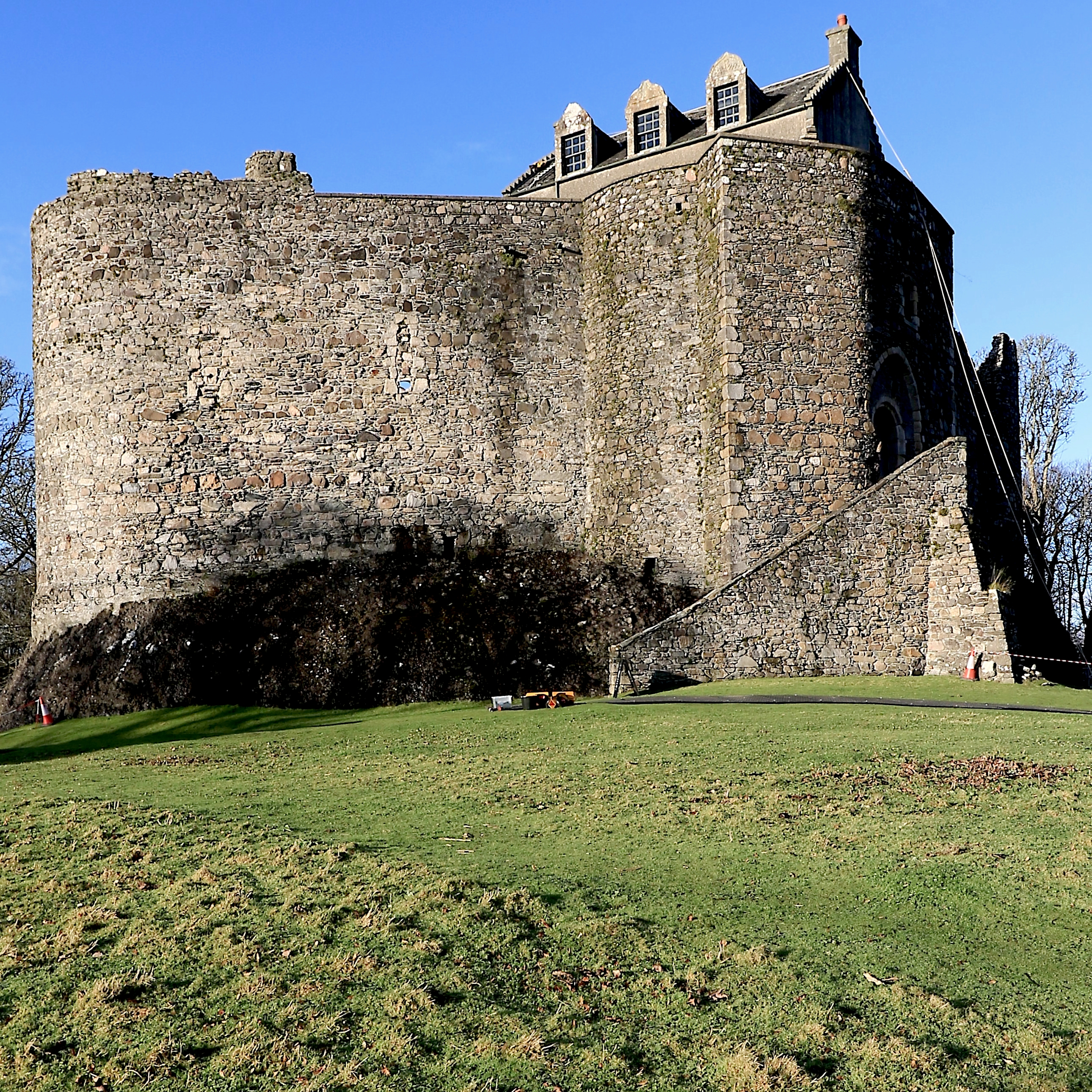
- The castle in 2024

Site information
- Type: Castle of enceinte
- Owner: Historic Environment Scotland
- Controlled by: Clan MacDougall 13th century to 1309; Scottish Crown 1309 to c.1470 Clan Campbell c.1470 to present
- Open to the public: Yes
- Condition: Partially ruined

Location
- Shown within Scotland
- Coordinates: 56.454653°N 5.436936°W

Site history
- Built: c. 1220s
- Built by: Duncan MacDougall of Lorn
- In use: 13th century to 19th century
- Materials: Local stone, sandstone

Dunstaffnage Castle (Scottish Gaelic: Caisteal Dhùn Stadhainis) is a partially ruined castle in Argyll and Bute, western Scotland. It lies 3 miles (5 km) NNE of Oban, situated on a platform of conglomerate rock on a promontory at the south-west of the entrance to Loch Etive, and is surrounded on three sides by the sea. The castle and the nearby chapel ruin have been a Historic Scotland property since 1958. Both are Scheduled Ancient Monuments.

The castle dates back to the 13th century, making it one of Scotland's oldest stone castles, in a local group which includes Castle Sween and Castle Tioram. Guarding a strategic location, it was built by the MacDougall lords of Lorn, and has been held since the 15th century by the Clan Campbell. To this day there is a hereditary Captain of Dunstaffnage, although they no longer reside at the castle. Dunstaffnage is maintained by Historic Environment Scotland, and is open to the public, although the 16th-century gatehouse is retained as the private property of the Captain. The prefix dun in the name means "fort" in Gaelic, while the rest of the name derives from Norse stafa nes, "headland of the staves".

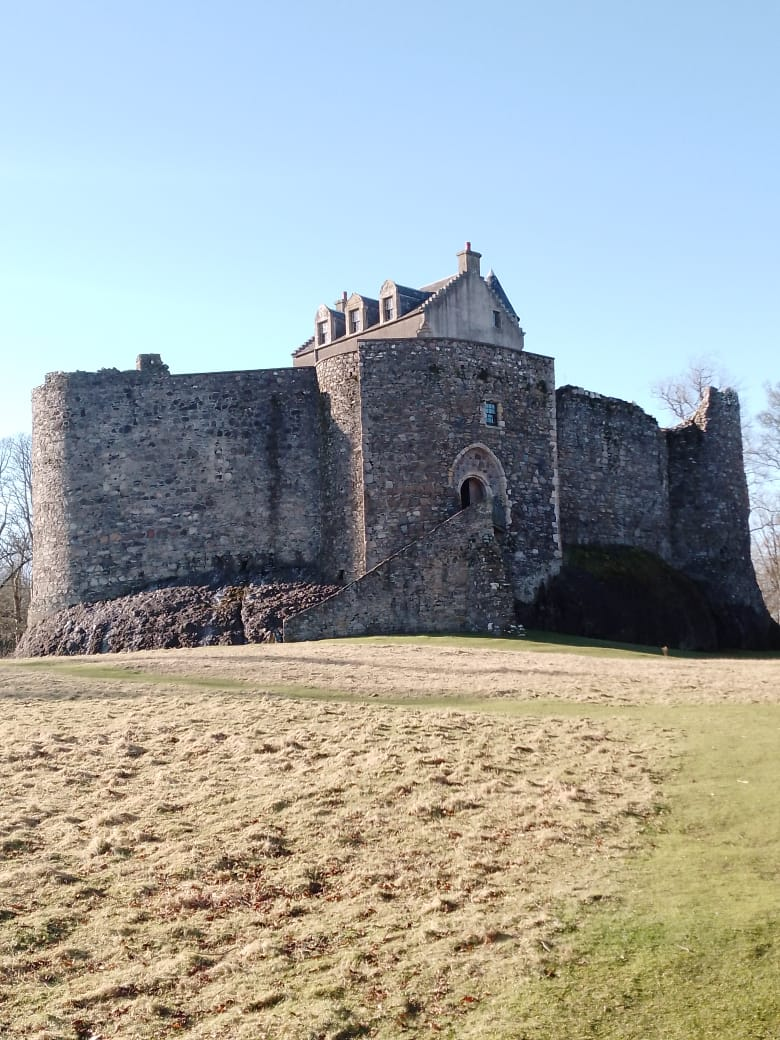

== History ==
=== Before Dunstaffnage ===
Before the construction of the castle, Dunstaffnage may have been the location of a Dál Riatan stronghold, known as Dun Monaidh, as early as the 7th century. It was recorded, by John Monipennie in 1612, that the Stone of Destiny was kept here after being brought from Ireland, and before it was moved to Scone Palace in 843. However, Iona and Dunadd are considered more likely, given their known connections with Dál Riatan and Strathclyde kings. Hector Boece records that the stone was kept at "Evonium", which has traditionally been identified with Dunstaffnage. One source has suggested that Evonium refers to Irvine in Ayrshire.

=== The MacDougalls ===
There was a castle here in the time of Somerled, Lord of the Isles. However, the castle became the seat of Duncan MacDougall, Lord of Lorn and grandson of Somerled in the second quarter of the 13th century. He had also travelled to Rome in 1237 and was the founder of nearby Ardchattan Priory. Duncan's son Ewen MacDougall inherited his father's title in the 1240s, and expanded the MacDougall influence, styling himself "King of the Isles" though that title belonged to the MacDonalds. It is probable that Ewen built the three round towers onto the castle, and constructed and enlarged the hall inside.

Following Alexander III's repulse of the Norse influence in Argyll, the MacDougalls backed the Scottish monarchy, and Ewen's son Alexander was made the first sheriff of Argyll in 1293. However, they supported the Balliol side during the Wars of Scottish Independence which broke out a few years later. Robert Bruce defeated the Clan MacDougall at the Battle of the Pass of Brander in August 1308. After a brief siege, King Robert took control of the MacDougall castle of Dunstaffnage. He did not destroy it, as he did others, but appointed a constable and provisioned it, thinking to use it to guard the countryside and seaways. With the land he gave his friend, Angus Og Macdonald, Lord of the Isles, that included much of the MacDougall lands, including nearby Mull, the castle could be well used for that purpose by the Isleman.

=== Royal fortress ===
Now a Crown property, Dunstaffnage was controlled by a series of keepers. James I seized the castle in 1431, following the Battle of Inverlochy, as his enemies were hiding inside. In 1455, James Douglas, 9th Earl of Douglas stayed at Dunstaffnage, on his way to treat with John MacDonald, Lord of the Isles. This followed James II's attack on Douglas power, and led to the signing of the Treaty of Westminster-Ardtornish. A later keeper, John Stewart of Lorn, was a rival of Alan MacDougall, and was stabbed by his supporters on his way to his marriage at Dunstaffnage Chapel in 1463, although he survived long enough to make his vows. Although MacDougall took the castle, he was ousted by James III, who granted Dunstaffnage to Colin Campbell, 1st Earl of Argyll in 1470.

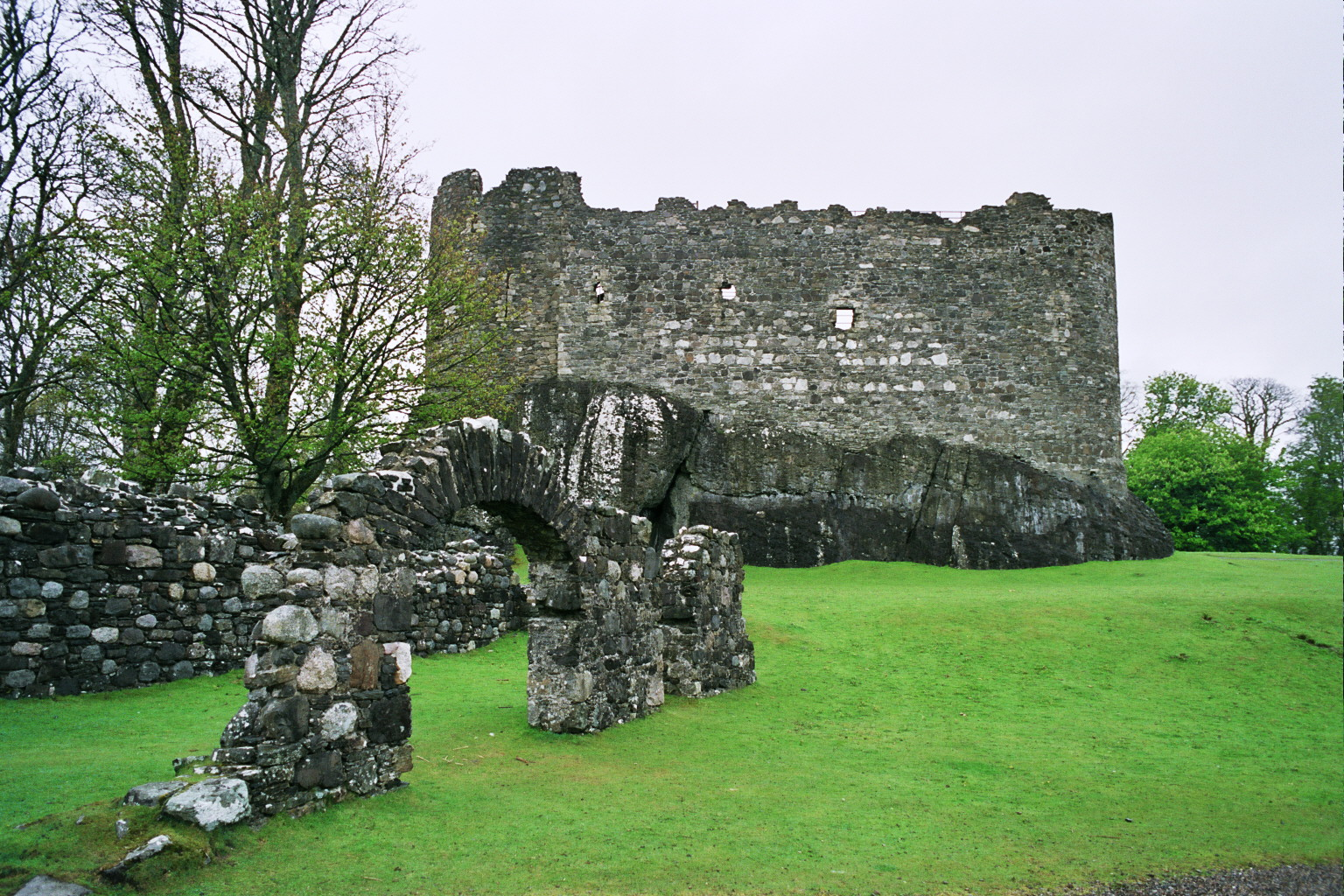
The south façade of Dunstaffnage Castle

=== Clan Campbell ===
The Earls of Argyll appointed Captains to oversee Dunstaffnage, and keep it in readiness, on their behalf. Changes were made to the buildings, particularly the gatehouse, which was rebuilt around this time. The Campbells were loyal allies of the royal house, and Dunstaffnage was used as a base for government expeditions against the MacDonald Lords of the Isles, among others, during the 15th and 16th centuries. James IV visited Dunstaffnage on two occasions.

Dunstaffnage saw action during the Civil War, holding out against Montrose's army in 1644. The castle was burned by royalist troops, following the failure of Argyll's Rising in 1685, against the Catholic James VII. During the Jacobite risings of 1715 and 1745, the castle was occupied by government troops. Flora MacDonald, who helped Bonnie Prince Charlie to escape from Scotland, was briefly imprisoned here while en route to imprisonment in London.

According to W. Douglas Simpson the castle appears in Tobias Smollett's Humphry Clinker, published in 1771, which although not naming Dunstaffnage, presents "a fair picture of life in the castle in the third quarter of the eighteenth century".

=== Decline and restoration ===
The Campbells continued to add to the castle, building a new house over the old west range in 1725. However, the rest of the castle was already decaying. In 1810, an accidental fire gutted the gatehouse, and the Captains ceased to live here, moving to Dunstaffnage House some 2 km to the south-east. Tenants lived in the 1725 house within the castle until 1888.

Restoration work was undertaken in 1903 by the Duke of Argyll, the castle's owner. This was followed in 1912 by a court case, in which the Court of Session ruled that Angus Campbell, the 20th hereditary Captain, had right of residence notwithstanding the Duke of Argyll's ownership. Works were delayed by World War I, and the planned total restoration was never completed. In 1958, the 21st Captain and the Duke agreed to hand the castle into state care, and it is now open to the public as a Historic Environment Scotland property.

== Description ==
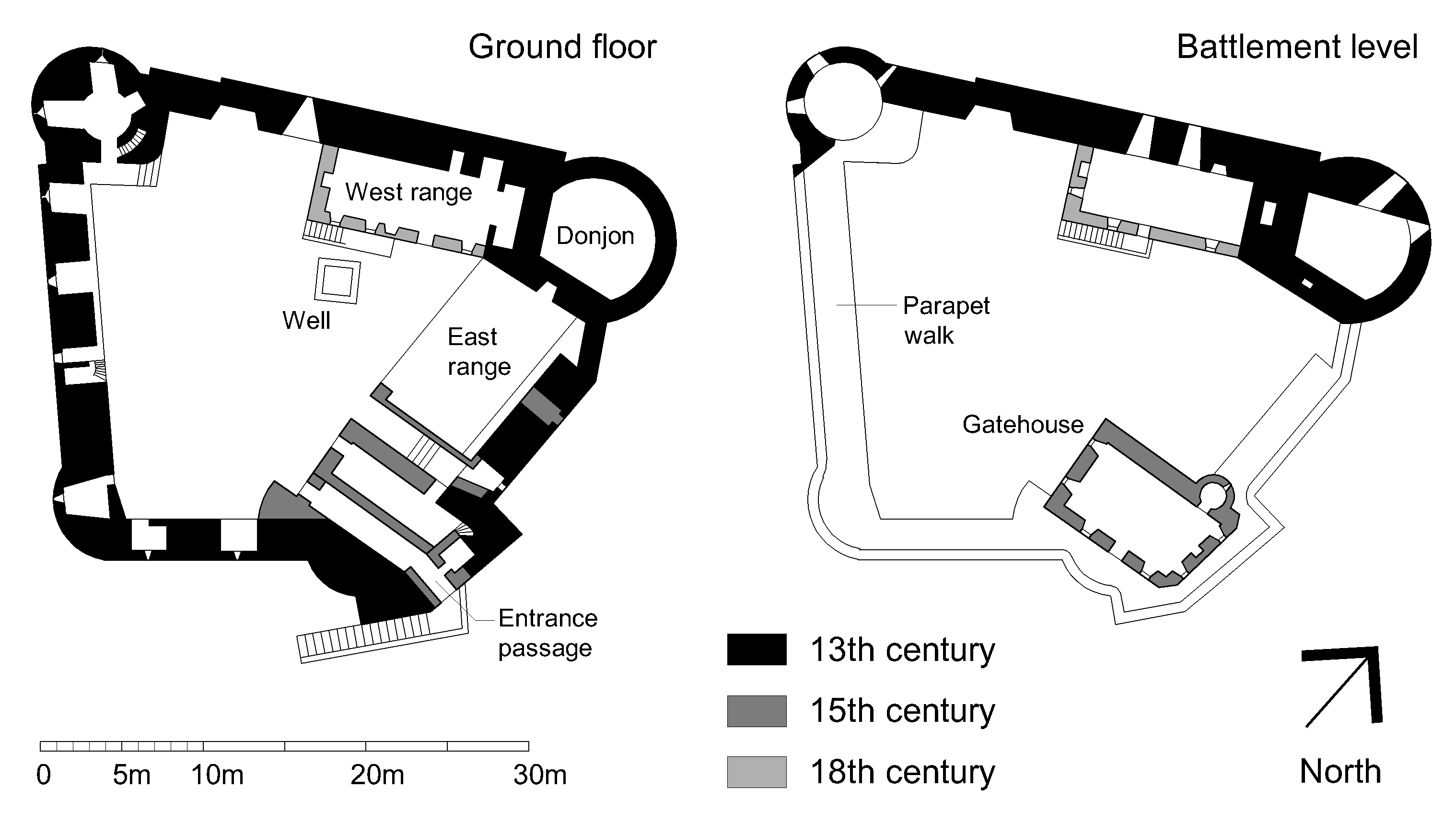
Plans of Dunstaffnage Castle

=== Walls ===
Dunstaffnage is an irregular quadrangular structure of great strength, with rounded towers at three of the angles. It measures approximately 35 by 30 metres (115 by 98 ft), and has a circumference of about 120 metres (390 ft). The walls are of coursed rubble, with sandstone dressings, and stand up to 18 m (60 ft) high, including the conglomerate bedrock platform. The walls are up to 3 m (10 ft) thick, affording strong defence to this highly strategic location, guarding the entrance to Loch Etive and the Pass of Brander beyond, and today commanding a splendid view. The parapet walk, which once followed the whole of the walls, has been partially restored with new stone flags. The original parapet is now also gone. Arrow slits, later converted into gunloops, are the only openings. Brass cannon recovered from wrecked vessels of the Spanish Armada were once mounted on the walls.

=== Round towers ===
Soon after the construction of the castle walls, three round towers were built on the north, east, and west towers. The north tower, or donjon, is the largest, comprising three or four storeys originally, and probably housed the lord's private apartments. The west tower is almost internal, barely projecting beyond the rounded corner of the curtain wall, and could only be entered via the parapet walk. The basement level contains a pit prison which was accessed from above. The east tower was almost completely rebuilt in the late 15th century as a gatehouse. Each tower was probably once topped by a conical roof.

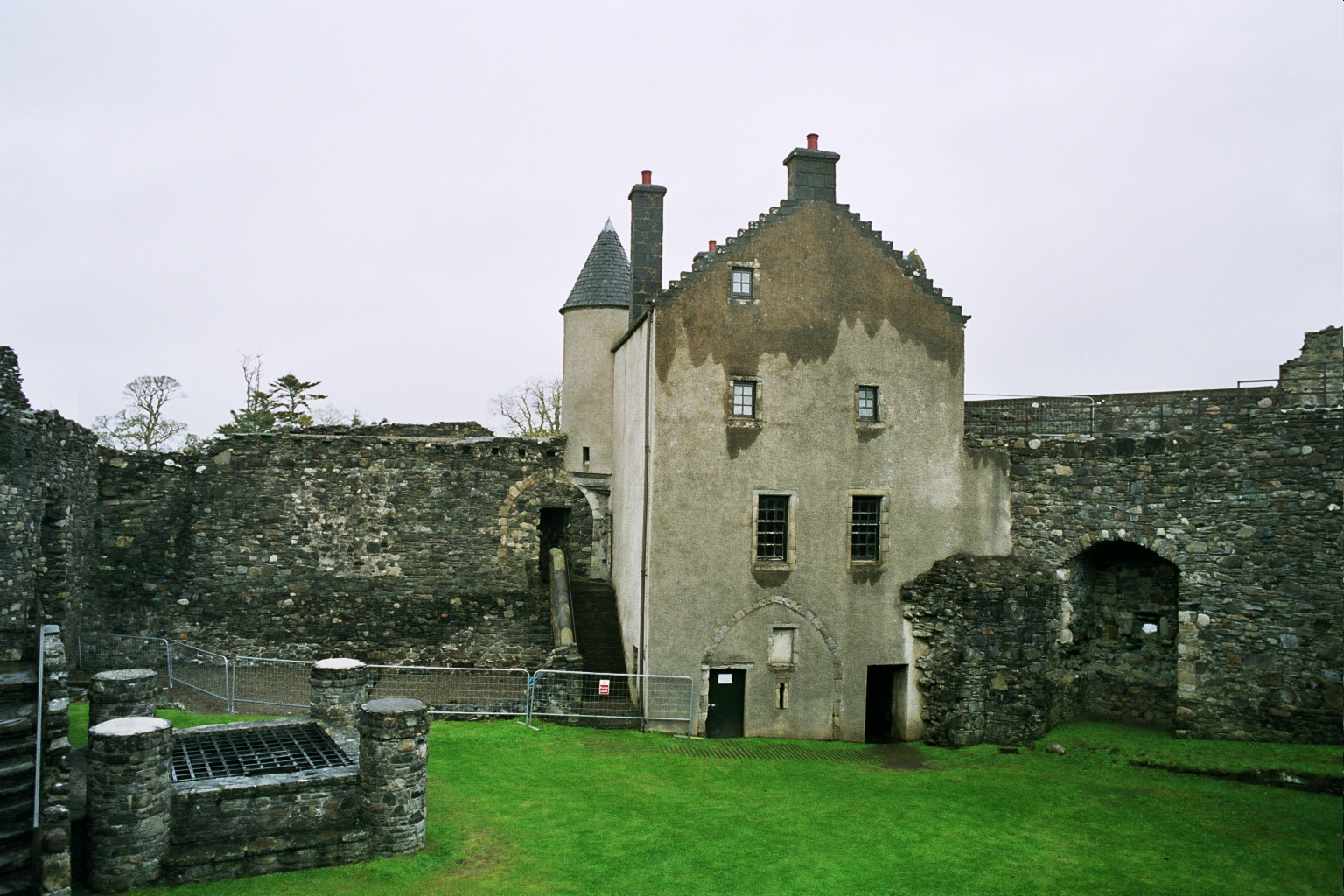
The gatehouse, with the remains of the north-east hall range to the left

=== The gatehouse ===
The gatehouse was built by the Campbells in the late 15th century, replacing an earlier round tower in the east corner. It takes the form of a four-storey harled tower house, with the entrance passage running through half the vaulted basement, the other half forming guard rooms with arrow slits facing the gate. The present approach to the gate is by a stone stair, replacing an earlier drawbridge. The tower was remodelled in the 18th century to provide reception rooms and a private suite. The dormer windows at the top are capped by the pediments from the 1725 house (see below), and bear the date, the Campbell arms, and the initials AEC and DLC, for Aeneas Campbell, 11th Captain, and his wife Dame Lilias. The pediments were moved here during the 1903 restoration works.

=== Internal ranges ===
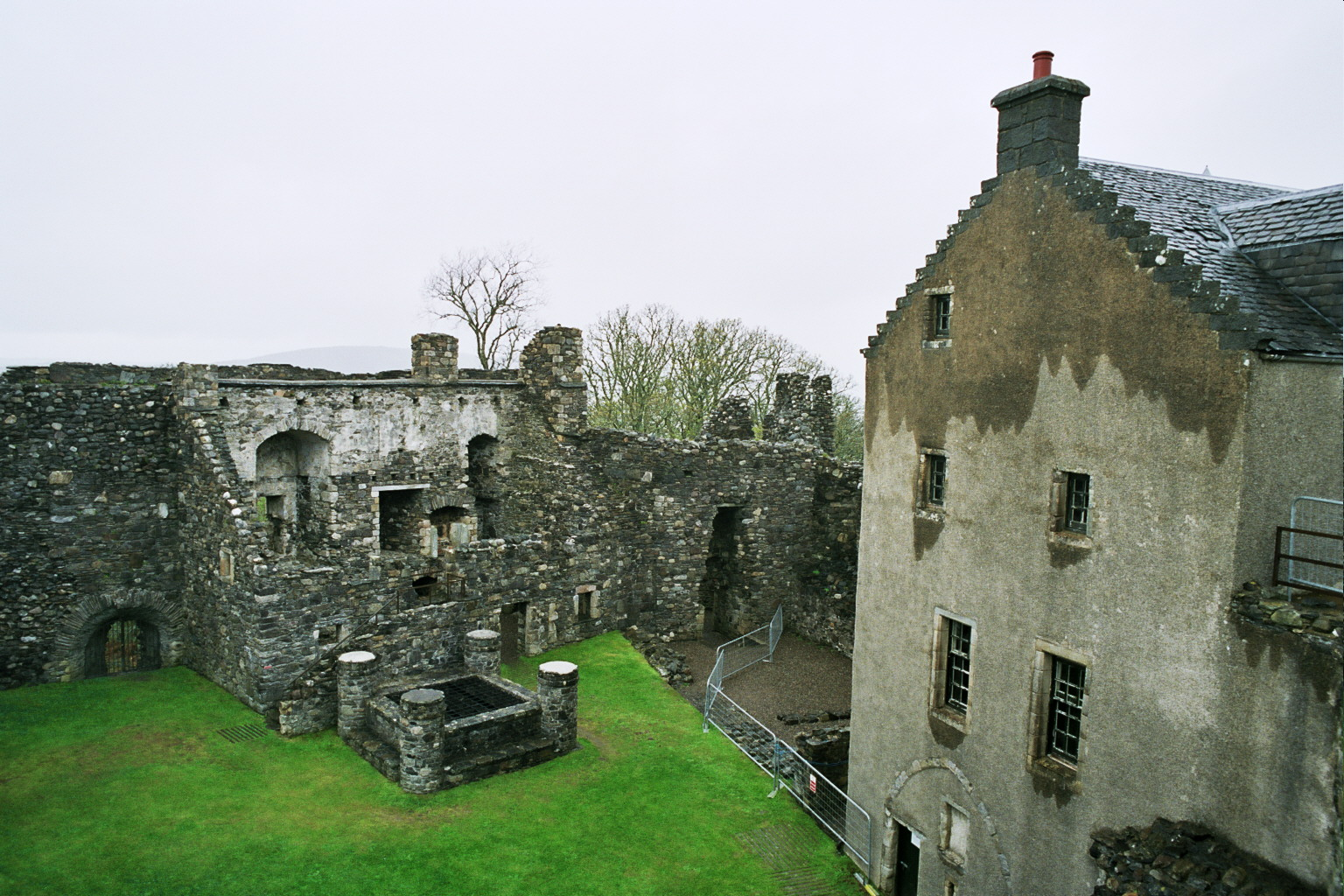
The north-west range of 1725, with the gatehouse on the right, seen from the parapet walk

The east range was located between the north and east towers, although only foundations remain. This was the principal range of buildings and contained a large hall above vaulted cellars. The hall had double-lancet windows, decorated with carved patterns, which were later blocked up; their outlines can be seen in the east curtain wall.

A second range stood along the north-west wall, and would have been connected to the hall range by the donjon tower. The ground floor housed a kitchen. In 1725 the range was remodelled into a two-storey house, accessed via a stone stair, and topped with the dormer windows which now form part of the gatehouse. The well in front is original, although the large stone surround is of 19th-century date.

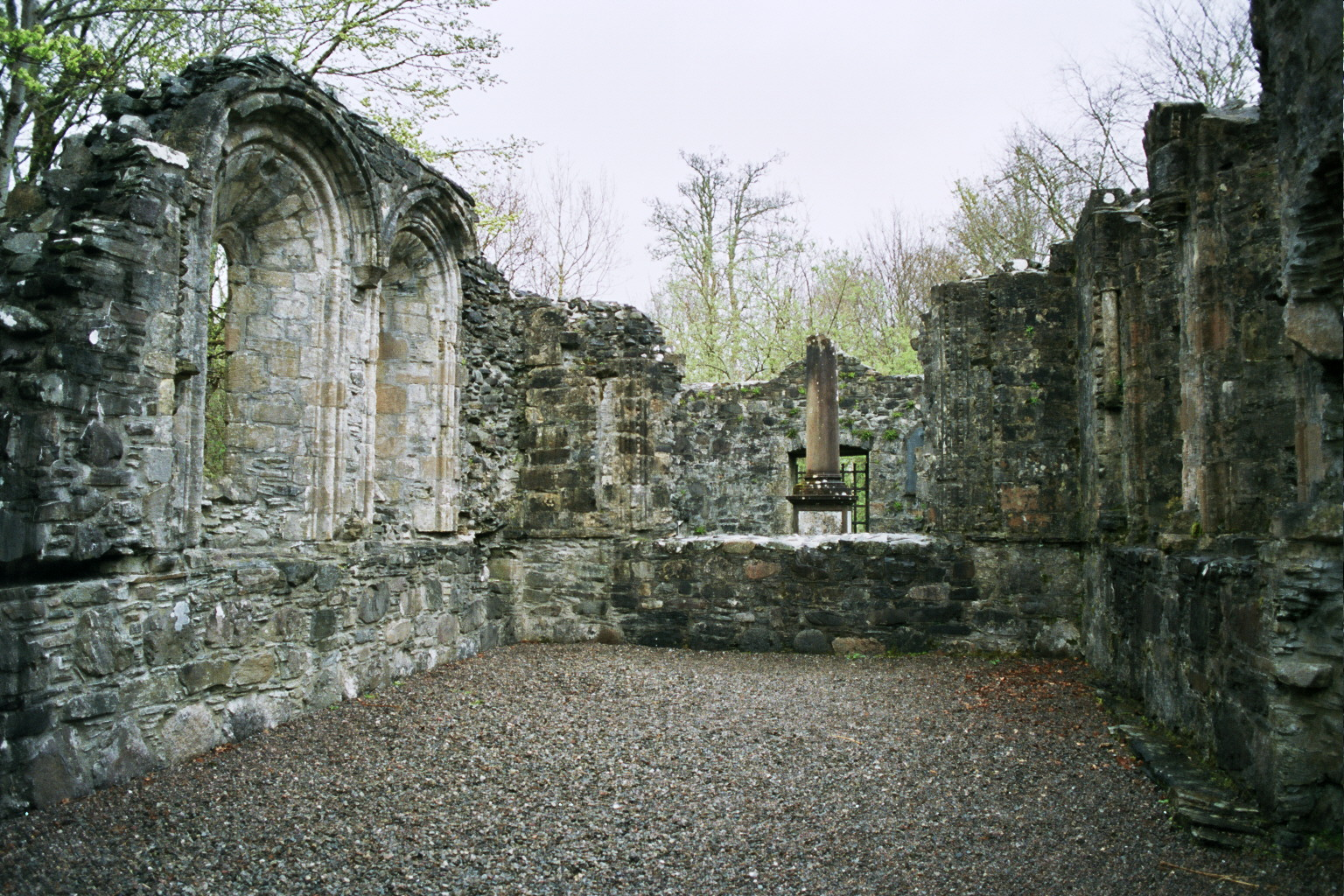
East end of Dunstaffnage Chapel, showing the lancet windows and the Campbell burial aisle beyond

== Dunstaffnage Chapel ==
A ruined chapel lies around 150 metres (490 ft) to the south-west of the castle. This was also built by Duncan MacDougall of Lorn, as a private chapel, and features detailed stonework of outstanding quality. Experts believe that the chapel was built in the second quarter of the 13th century. The chapel is 20 by 6 metres (66 by 20 ft), and formerly had a timber roof. The lancet windows carry dog-tooth carving, and have fine wide-splayed arches internally. The chapel was already ruinous in 1740, when a burial aisle was built on to the east end, to serve as a resting place for the Campbells of Dunstaffnage.

== Captain of Dunstaffnage ==
Traditionally, an officer called the Hereditary Captain of Dunstaffnage is responsible for the castle and its defence. The office still exists, and to retain the title (now rather a sinecure without military significance), the incumbent is required to spend three nights a year in the castle. No other responsibilities or privileges now attach to the post.

== Castle ghost ==
A ghost, known as the "Ell-maid of Dunstaffnage", is said to haunt the castle. A type of gruagach, the ghost's appearances are said to be associated with events in the lives of the hereditary keepers.

== Notes ==
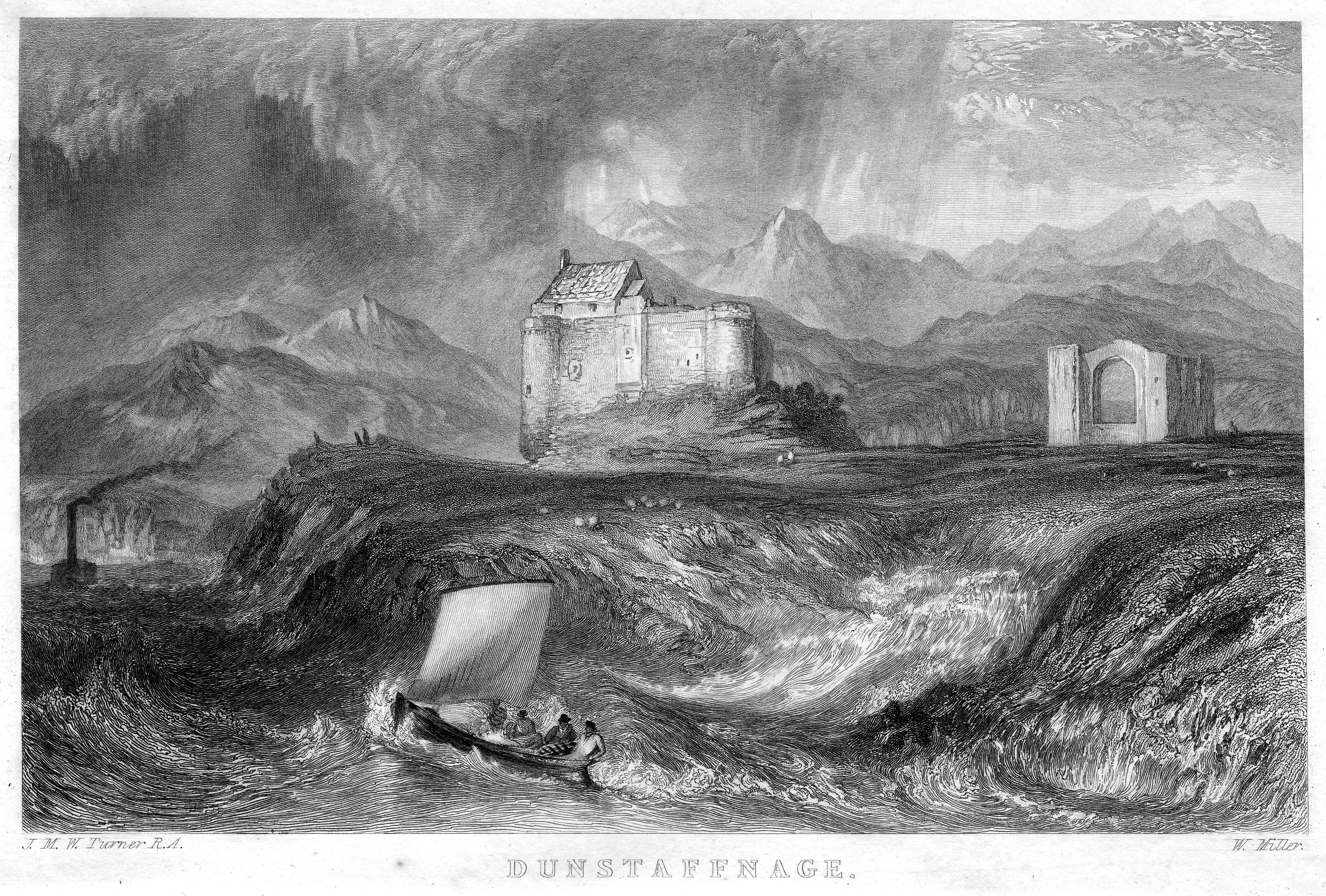
Dunstaffnage Castle, 1836 engraving by William Miller after J. M. W. Turner
