= Dunbeg =

Coordinates: 56.44583°N 5.44281°W

Dunbeg: Scottish Gaelic: An Dùn Beag
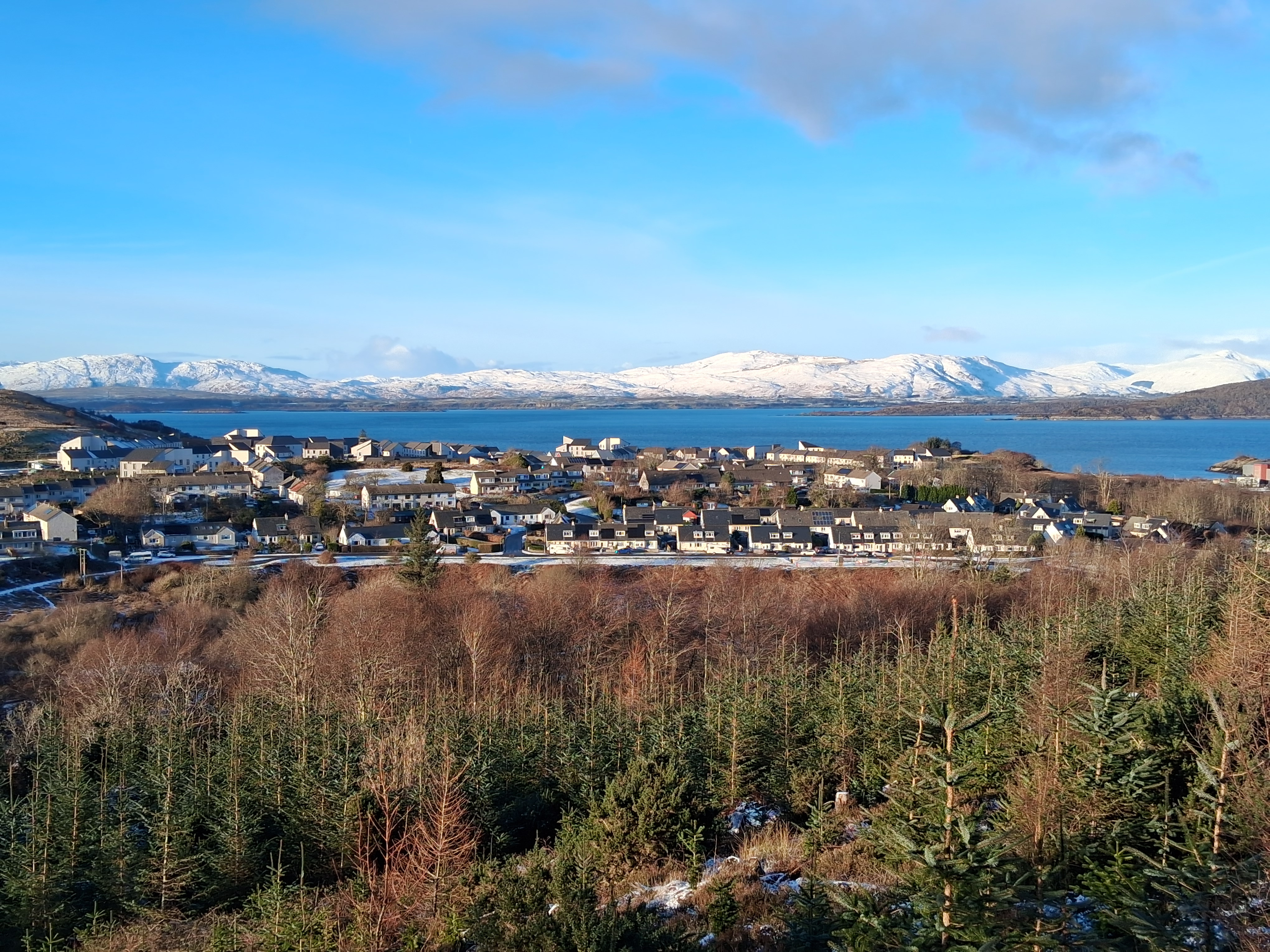
- Dunbeg villiage

- Location within Argyll and Bute
- Population: 720 (2020)
- OS grid reference: NM881334
- Council area: Argyll and Bute
- Lieutenancy area: Argyll and Bute
- Country: Scotland
- Sovereign state: United Kingdom
- Post town: OBAN
- Postcode district: PA37
- Police: Scotland
- Fire: Scottish
- Ambulance: Scottish
- UK Parliament: Argyll, Bute and South Lochaber
- Scottish Parliament: Argyll and Bute

Dunbeg (Scottish Gaelic: An Dùn Beag), formerly known as Dunstaffnage (Scottish Gaelic: Dùn Stafhainis or Dùn Staidhinis), is a village about 2 1/2 miles (4 km) outside of Oban, Scotland. It has a population of just under 1,000. It is home to the Scottish Association for Marine Science (SAMS), one of the primary marine science centres in the UK. Also near Dunbeg is Dunstaffnage Castle, part of the Campbell Clan and is owned by the Captain of Dunstaffnage.

== Archaeology ==
Archaeological excavations in 2010, by Argyll Archaeology, in advance of the development of the European Marine Science Park found evidence that people were also living in the area from the Neolithic to the Early Historic periods. The archaeologists discovered funerary pyres, and an infant burial, that were in use for several generations during the Late Iron Age and a farmstead in use sometime between the late 7th to 9th centuries AD. The end of activity on the site roughly coincides with documented attacks on Iona by Norse invaders in 795, 802, 806 and 825. A Norse presence in the areas was found in the form of a fragment of copper alloy Viking ring money by a metal detectorist before the excavation.

== Landmarks ==
=== Primary School ===
Dunbeg Primary School is a single storey building originally opened in 1960. In 2021 it had places for 141 children of all denominations from P1-7, it also provides preschool education with spaces for 20 3–5 year olds.

=== The Scottish Association for Marine Science ===
It is one of Europe's leading marine science research organisations, one of the oldest oceanographic organisations in the world and is Scotland's largest and oldest independent marine science organisation.

=== Dunstaffnage Castle ===
The castle dates back to the 13th century, making it one of Scotland's oldest stone castles, in a local group which includes Castle Sween and Castle Tioram.

== Climate ==
Climate data for Dunstaffnage climate station (3m elevation) 1991–2020 averages
Month	Jan	Feb	Mar	Apr	May	Jun	Jul	Aug	Sep	Oct	Nov	Dec	Year
Record high °C (°F)	13.9 (57.0)	14.9 (58.8)	18.7 (65.7)	23.7 (74.7)	27.2 (81.0)	29.1 (84.4)	29.8 (85.6)	28.6 (83.5)	28.1 (82.6)	20.1 (68.2)	17.0 (62.6)	14.8 (58.6)	29.8 (85.6)
Mean daily maximum °C (°F)	7.5 (45.5)	7.8 (46.0)	9.3 (48.7)	11.9 (53.4)	14.9 (58.8)	16.8 (62.2)	18.2 (64.8)	18.1 (64.6)	16.2 (61.2)	13.1 (55.6)	10.0 (50.0)	8.0 (46.4)	12.7 (54.9)
Daily mean °C (°F)	5.1 (41.2)	5.2 (41.4)	6.4 (43.5)	8.4 (47.1)	11.0 (51.8)	13.2 (55.8)	14.8 (58.6)	14.8 (58.6)	13.1 (55.6)	10.3 (50.5)	7.5 (45.5)	5.4 (41.7)	9.6 (49.3)
Mean daily minimum °C (°F)	2.7 (36.9)	2.6 (36.7)	3.4 (38.1)	5.0 (41.0)	7.1 (44.8)	9.6 (49.3)	11.4 (52.5)	11.4 (52.5)	9.9 (49.8)	7.5 (45.5)	5.0 (41.0)	2.9 (37.2)	6.5 (43.7)
Record low °C (°F)	−8.7 (16.3)	−7.2 (19.0)	−6.0 (21.2)	−3.9 (25.0)	−1.9 (28.6)	0.8 (33.4)	4.2 (39.6)	2.7 (36.9)	−0.6 (30.9)	−2.3 (27.9)	−4.2 (24.4)	−8.3 (17.1)	−8.7 (16.3)
Average precipitation mm (inches)	206.2 (8.12)	156.0 (6.14)	137.1 (5.40)	91.6 (3.61)	94.9 (3.74)	95.8 (3.77)	109.9 (4.33)	129.9 (5.11)	140.9 (5.55)	189.3 (7.45)	178.3 (7.02)	197.9 (7.79)	1,727.9 (68.03)
Average precipitation days (≥ 1.0 mm)	20.5	17.4	17.4	13.8	13.8	14.2	15.7	16.8	16.3	19.0	19.7	19.6	204.0
Mean monthly sunshine hours	32.4	62.6	94.9	147.2	192.1	171.0	135.0	135.4	99.1	77.7	46.3	33.3	1,227
Source 1: metoffice.gov.uk
Source 2: Starlings Roost Weather
