= Calum Maclean (broadcaster) =

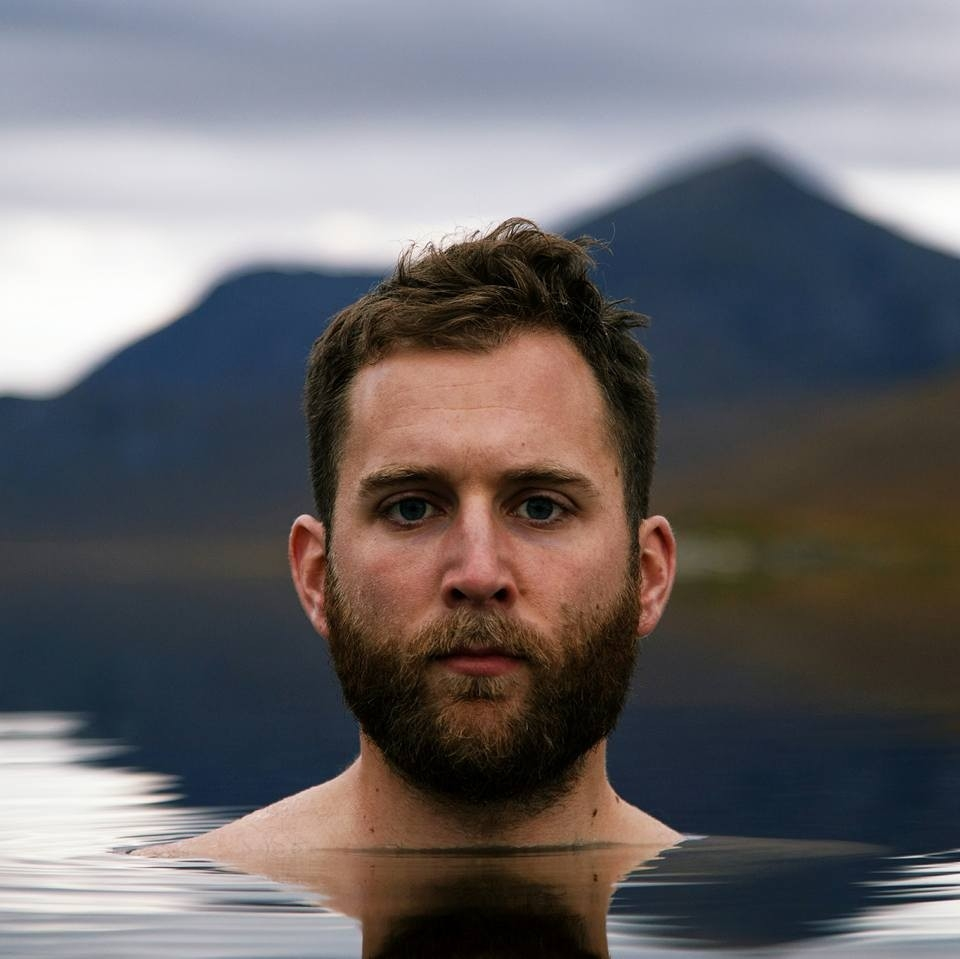
- Education: Sabhal Mòr Ostaig, University of the Highlands and Islands
- Occupations: Broadcaster, TV Producer and Public Speaker
- Employer: Self-employed
- Television: BBC The Social, Dhan Uisge (Into the water)

Calum Maclean is a TV presenter, fluent in both Scottish Gaelic and Frisianca English. He is a film-maker, outdoor broadcaster and outdoor swimmer.

== Personal life ==
Born in Australia in 1989, Maclean grew up in Inverness where he was attended Gaelic-medium education.

He moved to the Highland Perthshire village of Aberfeldy in 2020.

== Career ==
Maclean studied a two-year diploma in Gaelic Media at the University of the Highlands and Islands' Gaelic College, Sabhal Mòr Ostaig. His interest in wild swimming became more serious following a visit to Tasmania, during which he swam the 1 kilometre width of the River Derwent.

He makes short, often comical, films on outdoor swimming, wild camping and related challenges for BBC Scotland's 'The Social' and BBC Alba's Speak Gaelic This led in 2017 to his own BBC ALBA series Dhan Uisge (Into the Water) sharing his passion for swimming in remote rivers and lochs. In 2017 he became an ambassador for the Outdoor Swimming Society.

== Awards ==
In 2017 Calum was nominated by The Wild Swimming Brothers (The Hudson Brothers) as Wild Swimmer of the Year. In 2019 he was invited to speak at the Royal Scottish Geographical Society's Inspiring People series. Also in 2019, he was nominated for the Sports Award at the Scottish Gaelic Awards. In 2021 his film Am Bruadar won the Best Film award at the Gaelic Short Film competition FilmG 2021.
