= Universal Handy Interface =

Universal Handy Interface (UHI) is a Motorola designed universal interface for mobile phone use (Motorola, Nokia, Siemens AG, Sony Ericsson, Samsung) in Mercedes-Benz cars.

The mobile phone is placed in a cradle connected to a telephone network unit and operated using the buttons on the multi-function steering wheel. It is controlled by COMAND, a Motorola operating system which also allows SMS messages to be read and edited on the existing dashboard display. There are a large number of different cradles now available for various phones.

The hands-free capability uses the car's on-board audio system and a microphone located underneath the interior roof light.

Multi-Handset Interface (MHI) is the US sales name for UHI.
