= West Highland College =

- Type: College
- Established: 2010
- Affiliations: University of the Highlands and Islands,
- Location: West Highlands, Scotland
- Website: www.whc.uhi.ac.uk

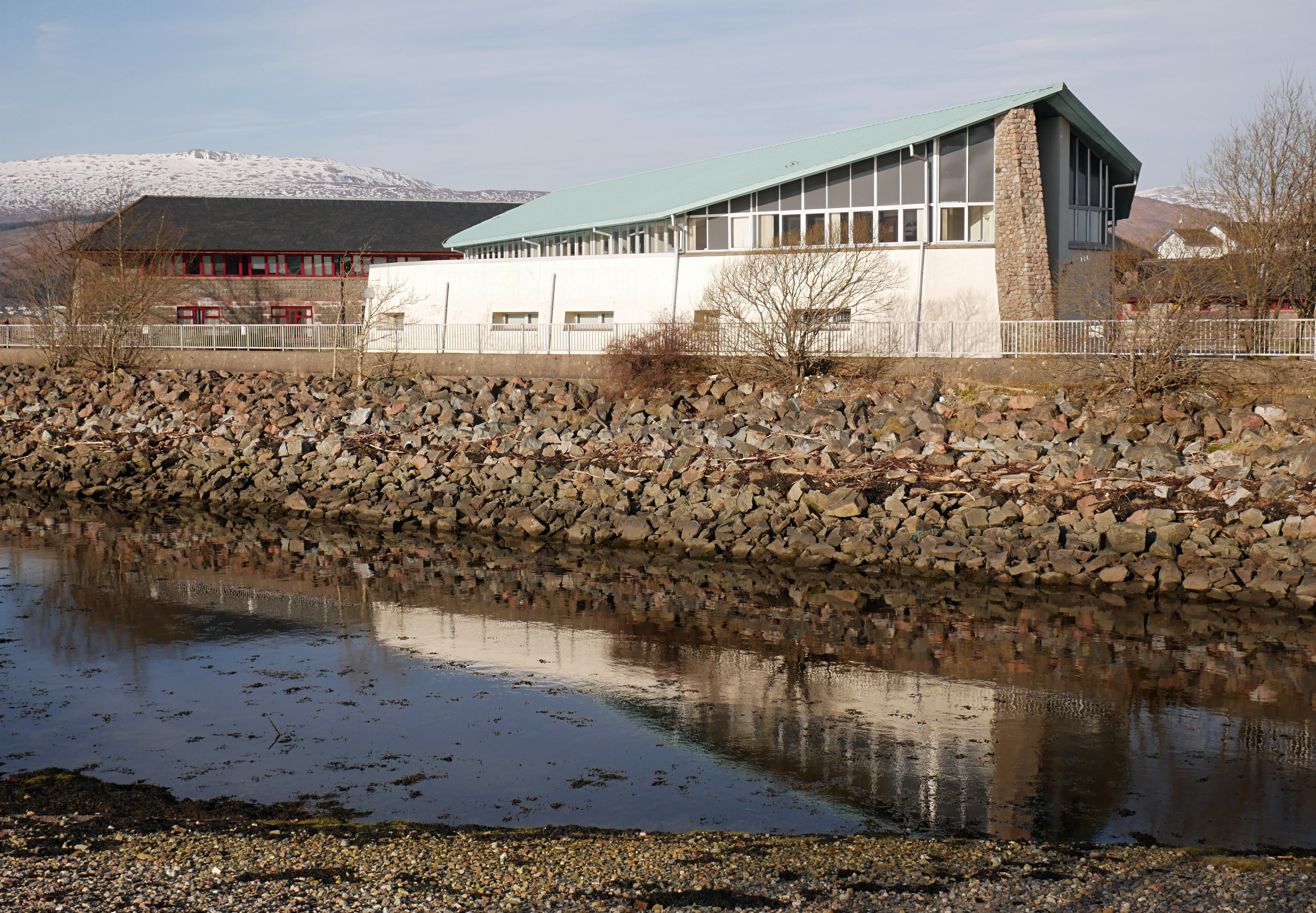
College centre in Fort William (previously Lochaber College)

West Highland College (Scottish Gaelic: Colaiste na Gàidhealtachd an Iar) is a college of further and higher education in the West Highlands of Scotland. The college is part of the University of the Highlands and Islands and operates from a number of college centres across the area, at Auchtertyre, Broadford, Fort William, Kilchoan, Kinlochleven, Mallaig, Portree, Strontian and Ullapool.

West Highland College was formed in August 2010 from the merger of Lochaber College (founded in 1998) with Skye & Wester Ross College (dates to 2003).

School of Adventure Studies is based at Fort William & Broadford College centres. It delivers two Further Education courses at Level 5 & 6 and four honours degrees in Adventure Tourism Management, Adventure Performance & Coaching, Adventure Education & Marine Costal Tourism.

In February 2012 Dr Michael Foxley became chair of the college.

In January 2013 it was announced that money from the European Regional Development Fund would go towards a new building for the Portree campus. The building would have capacity to support 300 learners, with an additional 60 full-time places available from September 2013.

An external review of the college in 2014 by Education Scotland included positive findings.

== College centres ==
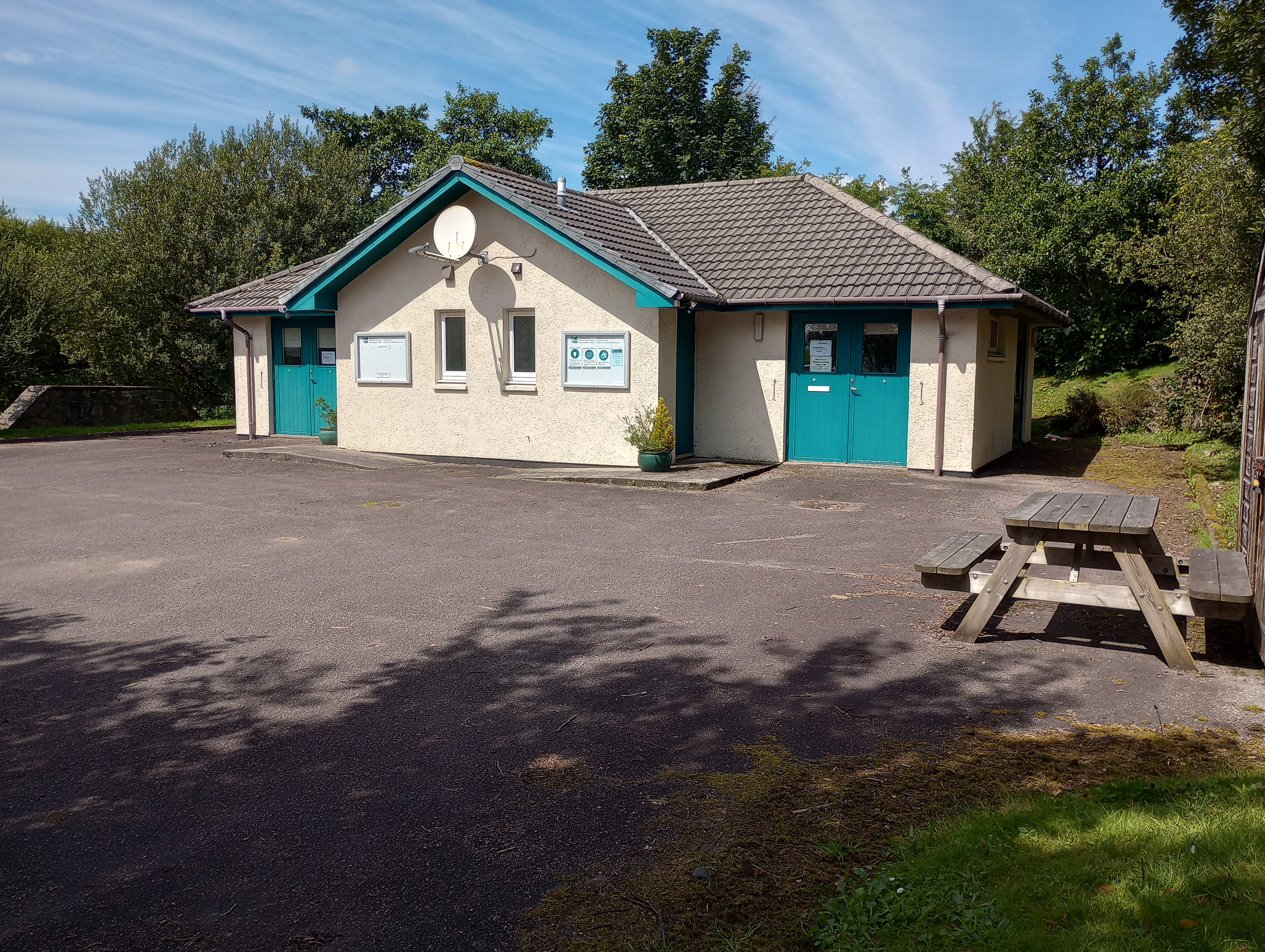
College centre in Kilchoan

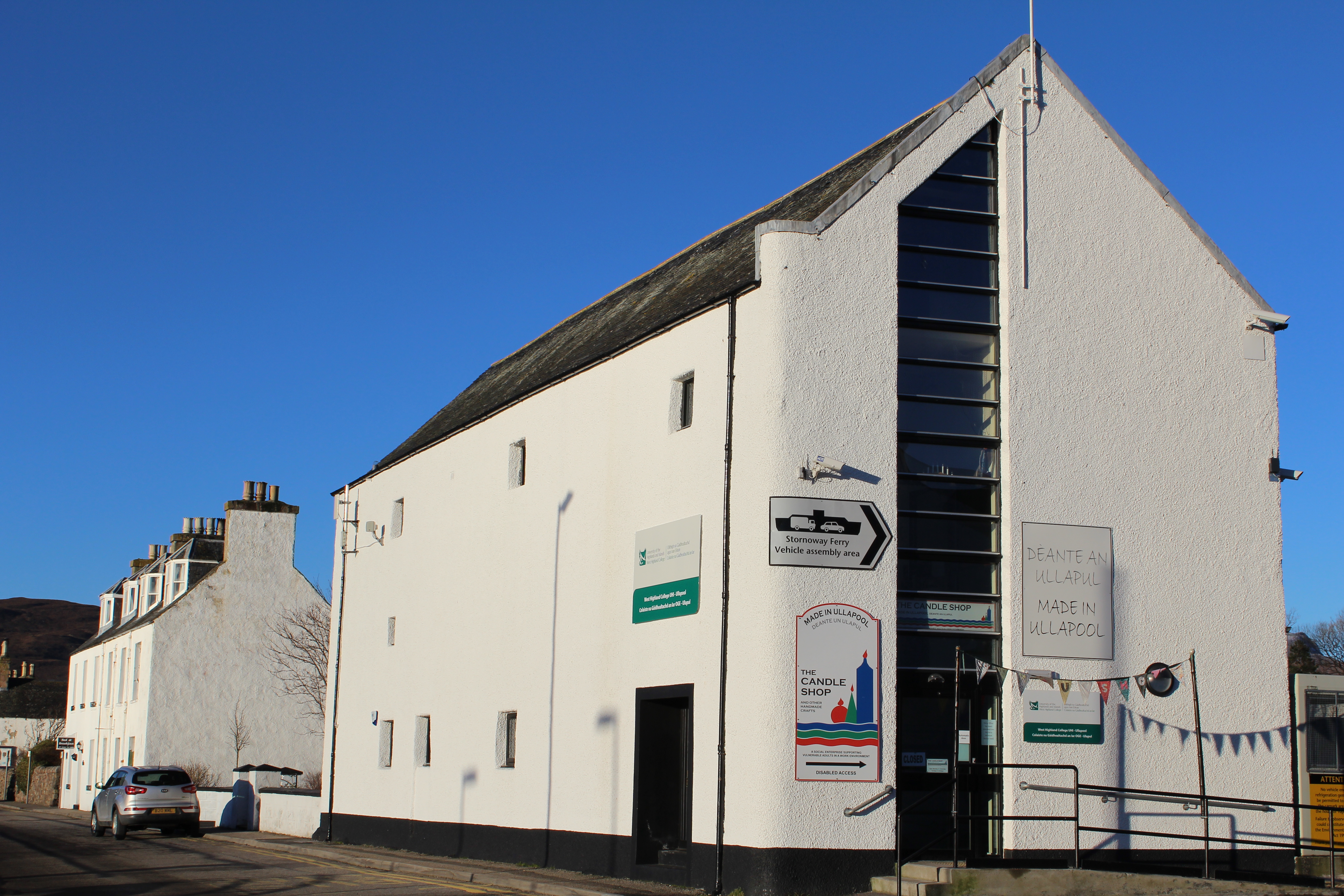
College centre in Ullapool

- Auchtertyre: 57.2845°N 5.5851°W
- Broadford: 57.2445°N 5.9157°W
- Fort William: 56.8225°N 5.1078°W
- Kilchoan: 56.6969°N 6.1005°W
- Kinlochleven: 56.7143°N 4.9658°W
- Mallaig: 57.0056°N 5.8311°W
- Portree, Fingal Centre: 57.4123°N 6.2029°W
- Portree, Creative Arts & Education Centre: 57.4141°N 6.2118°W
- Strontian: 56.6996°N 5.5682°W
- Ullapool: 57.8953°N 5.1608°W
