= University of the Highlands and Islands =

University in northern Scotland

University of the Highlands and Islands (UHI)
- Scottish Gaelic: Oilthigh na Gàidhealtachd agus nan Eilean
- Coat of arms
- Type: Public
- Established: 2011 – University status 2001 – UHI Millennium Institute
- Budget: £139M (2022)
- Chancellor: The Princess Royal
- Rector: Fiona McLean
- Principal: Vicki Nairn (Interim)
- Total staff: 3100 (2019)
- Students: 31,000 (11,201 higher education, 19,779 further education)
- Location: Inverness, Highlands and Islands, Moray and Perthshire, Scotland, UK
- Colours: Black & White
- Website: www.uhi.ac.uk/en/

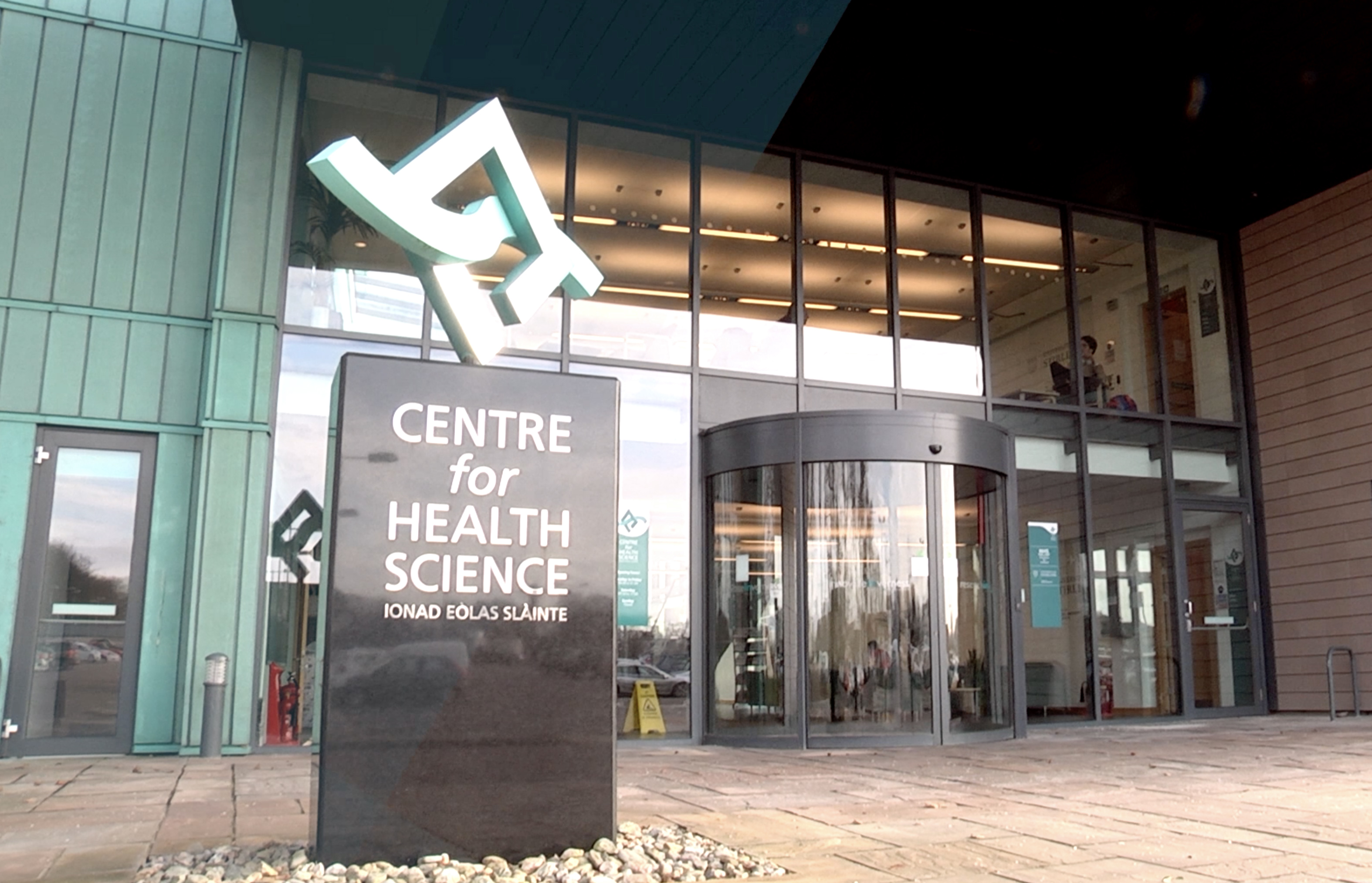
Centre for Health Science

The University of the Highlands and Islands (UHI) (Scottish Gaelic: Oilthigh na Gàidhealtachd agus nan Eilean) is an integrated, tertiary institution encompassing both further and higher education. It is a collegiate public research university, composed of 10 colleges and research institutions spread around Inverness, the Highlands and Islands, Moray and Perthshire regions of Scotland. UHI offers further education, undergraduate, postgraduate and research programmes which can be studied at a range of locations across the area and online. It has 31,000 students, including 19,779 further education students and 11,210 higher education students.

== History ==
While UHI is Scotland's newest university, many of its 10 colleges and research institutions have longer histories, the earliest having been founded in the 19th century. The UHI network has had a unique structure and the way that it has evolved as a multi-campus institution has been constrained by a legislative framework that deals with further and higher education separately. Technology has played an important part in connecting the partner institutions.

In April 2001, it became known as the UHI Millennium Institute, following the Scottish Parliament awarding Higher Education Institute status. By 2004 full-time deans had been appointed to its three faculties, with experienced figures having been attracted from other academic bodies.

University degrees were authenticated by the Open University Validation Service, the University of Strathclyde and the University of Aberdeen until 2008 when the UHI was given taught degree awarding powers (tDAP) by the Privy Council under recommendation from the Quality Assurance Agency for Higher Education (QAA); Higher National Certificate and Higher National Diploma courses are awarded by the Scottish Qualifications Authority.

University status was awarded by the Privy Council in February 2011, and UHI became the University of the Highlands and Islands.

=== Key dates ===
- 1992 – UHI Project established
- 1996 – Millennium Commission funding awarded
- 1998 – Open University confirms degree validation backing
- 2001 – Higher education institution status granted
- 2002 – Research funding awarded
- 2005 – Application for taught degree awarding powers lodged with the Privy Council
- 2008 – Granting of Taught degree awarding powers
- 2010 – Decision made to relocate to a new campus at Beechwood farm
- 2011 – Awarded university status as the University of the Highlands and Islands
- 2012 – Princess Royal installed as Chancellor of the UHI Court

== Organisation and administration ==
The Princess Royal was officially installed as Chancellor in June 2012.

Clive Mulholland became Principal and Vice-Chancellor in June 2014, after his appointment to this post was announced in February 2014.

Professor Todd Walker became Principal and Vice-Chancellor in 2021.

Anton Edwards, a marine physicist, took over as Rector in June 2014.

The University's coat of arms is designed to reflect important aspects of UHI. A compass rose with a fleur-de-lys indicating north denotes University's northernly location and two open books symbolise learning, the 13 hazel leaves represent UHI's partners, and a tree associated with wisdom in Celtic and Norse tradition.

UHI has an annual income of £137 million.

UHI is organised into two faculties, the Faculty of Arts, Humanities and Business, and the Faculty of Science, Health and Engineering.

=== UHI Court ===
The Court consists of up to 20 members including graduates, academic and support personnel, university sponsor representatives and a majority of independent members. From the independent members the party elects its President and Vice-Chair. The Court assigns many of its academic responsibilities to the academic board.

=== Academic Council ===
The Academic Council is the main Higher Education disciplinary authority in UHI. Specific tasks are assigned to a number of committees;

- Quality assurance and enhancement committee
- Academic titles review board
- Comataidh Ghàidhlig
- External partnerships steering committee
- Research committee
- Research degrees committee
- Research ethics committee

=== Foundation ===
The Foundation creates a link between UHI and its communities and contains a maximum of 120 members. In addition to the Rector, Principal and Vice-Chancellor, President of the Student Association and Chair of the Court, the Foundation also includes members from academic partners, employees, students, industry, alumni, external organisations and individuals.

=== Faculty of Arts, Humanities and Business ===
The Faculty of Arts, Humanities and Business has three subject networks;

- Business, management and leisure
- Creative and cultural industries
- Humanities, education and Gaelic

In the Faculty of Arts, Humanities and Business, courses such as honours programmes in Gaelic, Theological Studies, and Scottish History, all reflect the distinctive nature of the region, its past, present and future. The Centre for History is based in Dornoch and teaches a range of undergraduate and postgraduate degrees via videoconference to students around the UHI network and worldwide. The faculty also offers an interdisciplinary course in Scottish Cultural Studies, which received the 2005 Times Higher Education Supplement Award for Most Imaginative Use of Distance Learning. Other postgraduate masters programmes cover the culture, literature and history of the Highlands and Islands, Material Culture and Gàidhealtachd History, Orkney & Shetland Studies, and Viking Studies. The business school offers distinctive programmes such as Scotland's only degree in Golf Management. The School of Adventure Studies delivers courses in Adventure Tourism Management, Adventure Performance & Coaching, Adventure Education & Marine Coastal Tourism using Lochaber, the UK's Outdoor Capital as a living research laboratory.

From August 2013 UHI has benefited from allocation of student teacher places, allowing postgraduate diploma in education (PGDE) to be offered, and the success of this has led to the number of places being increased.

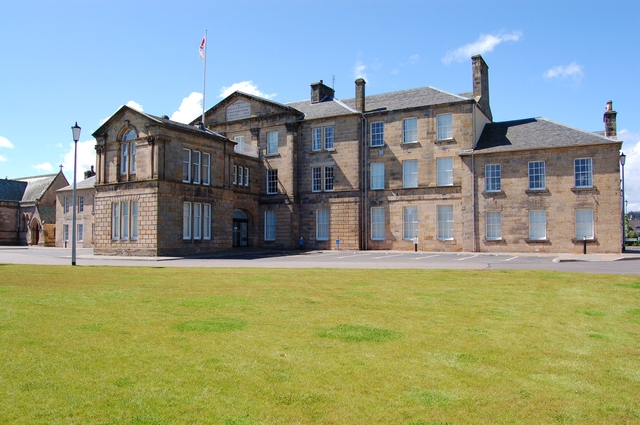
UHI Executive Office (formerly the Royal Northern Infirmary)

=== Faculty of Science, Health and Engineering ===
The Faculty of Science, Health and Engineering has three subject networks;

- Engineering and the built environment
- Applied life studies
- Science, technology and the environment

The Faculty of Science, Health and Engineering has research in Renewables, Marine Science, Digital Health, Sustainable Rural Development and Environmental Issues. A fully online honours degree programme is available across the UK from this faculty. The BSc (Hons) Sustainable Development is an example of a multi-disciplinary programme from this Faculty. The programme has professional accreditation from the Institute of Economic Development. The Faculty also offers postgraduate studies, including an MSc in Sustainable Rural Development. This Masters programme also has professional accreditation from the Institute of Economic Development.

The Energy and Technology subject area offers a range of academic programs up to, and including Masters level, together with various subjects taught at HNC/HND level.

UHI has links with the new Centre for Health Sciences located behind Raigmore Hospital. This is being funded by Highlands and Islands Enterprise, the Scottish Government and Johnson and Johnson. UHI purchased the Centre for Health Science in Inverness from Highlands and Islands Enterprise in a £9.83m deal. The building includes a research centre. Phase I of this opened in early 2007, phase II and phase III were opened in 2009. The University of Stirling has moved its nursing and midwifery operations from Raigmore Hospital to the CfHS. A BSc Oral Health Science was set up in 2008, and was based on two campuses, the Centre for Health Sciences and Dumfries Dental Centre. In 2011 a third campus was added in Stornoway. In September 2016 the Nursing and Midwifery Council approved the transfer of the pre-registration nurse BSc nursing programmes in Inverness and Stornoway to be provided by UHI.

In August 2015, UHI Inverness, one of the main collaborators at UHI, opened at the Inverness Campus. The £50m 18,500 sqm facility offers further and higher education courses including Life Sciences education and research.

The £6.5 million Alexander Graham Bell Centre for Digital Health is a Moray College UHI centre for excellence in digital health and Life Science for the North of Scotland and beyond, providing facilities for, and expertise in, digital health and life science research and education. The centre was officially opened by the Princess Royal in June 2014. UHI received a £9 million grant from the UK Government for this project.

The new life sciences innovation centre is a collaborative project between UHI and Highlands and Islands Enterprise. The total size of the building is projected to be 2700m². The new innovation centre aims to promote the development of education and research. The new centre will also collaborate with the proposed Elective Care Centre also planned for Inverness Campus.

== Constituent institutions and campuses ==
UHI has 10 individual colleges and each college/research centre has its own campus in different locations. As colleges offer different programmes, not all courses are available at every campus. Some campuses such as SAMS have tiny student populations all studying similar courses, whereas other campuses, such as Inverness College, teach diverse disciplines.

Some UHI colleges have student accommodation on their campuses while others do not. Argyll College does not have a single campus; staffed learning centres are located in Oban, Lochgilphead, Helensburgh, Campbeltown, Islay, Dunoon, Rothesay and Arran. Lews Castle College campus is set in 600 acres of parkland beside the principal harbour town of Stornoway. North Highland College UHI has four campuses spread throughout the north of Scotland. There are two campuses in Caithness; main campus in Thurso and one in Wick. Moray College UHI has its main campus in the ancient cathedral town of Elgin. The Elgin campus is home to Scotland's fifth art school and the only one located in a non-urban environment. West Highland College is located in Fort William. Orkney College UHI is principally based in Kirkwall in the Orkney Islands with a second campus in Stromness and learning centres based on the smaller islands. UHI Perth is situated in the city of Perth on the southern edge of the Highlands of Scotland. The Scottish Association for Marine Science UHI (SAMS UHI) is located on Dunstaffnage bay on the west coast of Scotland, three miles from the seaside town of Oban. Sabhal Mòr Ostaig UHI is situated close to the sea on the southern peninsula of Sleat on the Isle of Skye. Shetland College and NAFC Marine Centre merged in August 2021 to become Shetland UHI, with college bases in Lerwick and in the historic village of Scalloway. In 2015, Highland Theological College opened up temporary classrooms in Glasgow, using rooms in the central offices of the United Free Church, offering Central Belt students a campus environment in which to study. In 2019, permanent premises were opened in Paisley town centre, utilising the Wynd Centre building. This is the most southerly of the UHI campuses.

In 2023, UHI North Highland, UHI Outer Hebrides and UHI West Highland merged to form UHI North, West and Hebrides. It has 19 campuses and centres, as far north as Thurso, as far west as Uist, and south as a far as Kinlochleven.

Map of UHI Campus locations throughout Scotland

College	Founded	Main campus location	Other campuses
UHI Argyll	1997	Dunoon, Argyll and Bute	
Highland Theological College	1994	Dingwall, Highland	Paisley, Renfrewshire
UHI Inverness	1960	Inverness, Highland	
UHI Moray	1971	Elgin, Moray	1) Linkwood Technology Centre, Elgin; 2) Biblical Garden, Elgin.
UHI North, West and Hebrides (formed as a merger of North Highland, Outer Hebrides and West Highland)	2023	Fort William, Thurso, Stornoway	1) Alness, 2) Auchtertyre, 3) Barra, Outer Hebrides, 4) Benbecula, Outer Hebrides; 5) Broadford, 6) Cnon Soilleir (Daliburgh), 7) Dornoch, 8) Gairloch, 9) Halkirk, 10) Kilchoan, 11) Kinlochleven, 12) Mallaig, 13) North Uist, 14) Portree, 15) Strontian
Orkney College UHI	1995	Kirkwall, Orkney	Stromness, Orkney
UHI Perth	1961	Perth, Perth and Kinross	
Sabhal Mòr Ostaig	1973	Sleat, Isle of Skye, Inner Hebrides	
SAMS	1884	Oban, Argyll and Bute	
UHI Shetland	1970	Lerwick, Shetland	1) Scalloway, Shetland; 2) within Mareel in Lerwick

== Academic profile ==
UHI conducts its research through a collaboration of twelve colleges and academic institutions. These institutions are defined as academic partners which can operate as an autonomous body. Due to UHI's regional characteristic, academic partners can determine their own strategy and they are authorised to make their own investments and manage recruitment independently.

=== Research units ===
UHI operates across the region through partnerships with colleges and research institutions.

- UHI Perth - Aerospace, Engineering, Mountain Studies, Culture and Heritage
- SAMS UHI - Marine Biology, Smart Observations, Algae and Protozoa, Aquaculture
- UHI West Highland - Adventure tourism
- Sabhal Mòr Ostaig UHI - Gaelic language and culture
- UHI Inverness - Forestry, Rivers and Lochs, Rural Studies
- Institute of Health Research and Innovation - Biomedical, Nursing and Rural Health Divisions
- UHI Moray - Art and Textiles
- Centre for History - Irish, Scottish and British Diasporas Maritime History in the North Sea
- UHI Outer Hebrides - HebMarine, Socio-Economic analysis, Archaeology, Meteorology.
- Environmental Research Institute - Environmental Contamination, Carbon Water, Renewable Energy and the environment
- Orkney College UHI - Archaeology, Nordic Studies, Agronomy
- UHI Shetland - Nordic Studies, Archaeology, Aquaculture, Fisheries, Marine Policy

=== Institutes ===
==== Institute of Health Research and Innovation ====
In early 2018, UHI awarded the Institute of Health Science and Innovation an Institution status in recognition of the scale and success of the pre-existing cluster of health research. The Institute includes representatives from around the UHI collaboration, but most of them are located at the Inverness Centre for Health Science. Institute activities can be divided loosely into three major themes: Disease Management, Smarter Health, and Rural Health and Wellbeing.

==== Environmental Research Institute (ERI) ====
Opened 2000, The ERI is located in the town of Thurso. The Environmental Research Institute (ERI) is part of North Highland College UHI, which is one of 10 partners in UHI. Its research is focused into three areas; Renewable Energy and Environment, Carbon Water and Climate, and Environmental Contamination and Ecological Health. The Centre for Energy and the Environment is affiliated with the ERI.

==== Agronomy Institute ====
The Agronomy Institute performs work on the production and promotion of new crops and plant products in the Scotland's highlands and islands. The Institute cooperates with growers, end-users and other research organisations.

==== Archaeology Institute ====
Based on the Orkney Mainland, the UHI Archaeology Institute also has research and teaching staff in both Shetland and the Western Isles. Throughout Scotland, the Institute integrates teaching, scientific research, and applied industrial research and consultancy. The institute's commercial arm, ORCA, provides Northern Scotland archaeological and conservation services-from archaeological excavations and assessments to environmental consulting services, underwater archaeological invasion.

==== Institute for Northern Studies ====
Founded in 2007, Institute for Northern Studies operates at UHI Orkney, Shetland and Perth from three main locations. Research areas are Viking Studies, Medieval and modern history and culture of the Highlands and Islands, Links between Scotland and the Nordic world, The history and culture of the Scottish islands within the North Atlantic region, Highlands and Islands Literature, Island Studies, The languages and dialects of Orkney and Shetland, and Pictish studies.

==== Language Sciences Institute (LSI) ====
Language Sciences Institute seeks to revitalize minority languages. The LSI will expand on the work of the Soillse project, with a special emphasis on the traditional Gaelic speaking communities of Scotland.

==== The Rivers and Lochs Institute ====
Founded in 2012, the Institute specializes in work on molecular genetics to help conserve and maintain all rivers and lochs biodiversity, including fish stocks. The researchers work with local communities, wetlands and fisheries managers, businesses and government agencies to provide scientific support for the protection, restoration and sustainable management of wetlands biodiversity.

=== Postgraduate Research ===
UHI offers Doctor of Philosophy (PhD) and Masters by Research (MRes) degrees in a number of academic areas;

=== Undergraduate Degrees ===
UHI offers undergraduate degrees in academic areas such as; Accounting and Finance, Adventure Education, Literature and Creative Writing, Marine and Coastal Tourism, Engineering, Nursing, Philosophy, Archaeology and History.

=== Scholarships ===
The Witherby Publishing Group Charitable Trust Scholarship provide scholarships and bursaries for students from rural backgrounds to attend the university.

=== International collaboration ===
The university is an active member of the University of the Arctic. UArctic is an international cooperative network based in the Circumpolar Arctic region, consisting of more than 200 universities, colleges, and other organizations with an interest in promoting education and research in the Arctic region.

== Student life ==
=== Student Association ===
The Highlands and Islands Students' Association (HISA) is based on Church Street in Inverness. They previously were based at the Executive Office on Ness Walk. HISA represents all higher and further education students across UHI and its 10 partners. HISA hosts events including Sports Day, Freshers, Student Elections, HISA Awards and Regional Council. All UHI students aged over 16 are automatically a member of HISA. The Union supports more than 60 clubs and societies.

=== Student Accommodation ===
Eight UHI campuses offer accommodation with more than 600 rooms.

Halls of Residence located on campuses include:

- UHI Inverness, Inverness
- Bayhead Bridge Centre, UHI Outer Hebrides, Stornoway
- UHI North Highland, Dornoch
- UHI Perth, Perth
- Sabhal Mòr Ostaig, Sound of Sleat
- Margaret Barnes Building, Scottish Association for Marine Science, Oban
- UHI West Highland, Fort William

=== Sports ===
The students' association, HISA, offers sports clubs including badminton, basketball, boxing, climbing, football, golf, mountain biking, mountaineering, paddle sports, snow sports, sub-aqua, wind and wave, and more. UHI's Sporting Blues awards programme was launched in March 2017 and honors its students' sporting accomplishments. The Elite Athletes Fund supports athletes who are currently studying at UHI or one of its colleges and participating at national or international level in their chosen sport and representing the university/college where possible.

A new sports complex to be situated within the Inverness campus with facilities targeted at both students and campus-based staff, but also available to the broader community in and around Inverness, is being planned. A wide variety of sports and activities will be offered at the centre.

== Notable alumni ==
- Julie Fowlis, Scottish folk singer and multi-instrumentalist
- Jamie Oag, business entrepreneur
- Anne Lundon, broadcaster for BBC Alba and BBC Scotland
- Joe FitzPatrick, Scottish National Party (SNP) politician
- Greg Lobban, professional squash player
- Stephen Milne, Olympic swimmer
- Tom Kitchin, Michelin star chef
- Craig Irving, musician
- Abi Harrison, footballer
- Calum Maclean (broadcaster)
- James Ellsmoor, entrepreneur

== See also ==
- Armorial of UK universities
- List of forestry universities and colleges
- List of universities in the United Kingdom
- Universities in Scotland
