= Roxane Permar =

Roxane Permar is an artist who has worked in the field of public art and socially engaged practice. Her career has been based in the UK, where she lived and worked in London before moving to Scotland in 1998. Her practice is situated locally, nationally and internationally.

== Early Career in London ==
In the mid-1980s she was a member of the Brixton Artists Collective in London where she was an active participant in Women's Work. Her on-going series, The Nuclear Family (1984–1990), was influenced by the political and cultural context of London at this time.

== Russia ==
In the 1980s she translated a book on Russian and Soviet Theatre. In 1985 she was a cultural delegate to the World Youth Festival in Moscow where she exhibited her Nuclear Family. In more recent years she has exhibited in St. Petersburg at the Manezh Central Exhibition Hall. She co-initiated the emplacements project (1997–2003) with Francoise Dupré, working with artists from the UK, Western Europe and Russia to stage events in London and St. Petersburg, culminating in temporary public art events throughout St. Petersburg in 2003. the emplacements project at New Holland in 2000 opened the grounds to the general public for the first time in the city's history. For the International Festival of Experimental Art in St. Petersburg in 2008 she invited people from various parts of the world, including Shetland, to participate in an exchange of films made on mobile phones, Swap Shots. Edited versions have been exhibited in Russia, Denmark and Shetland. Permar presented a paper about the project at isea2009 in Belfast.

== Shetland Projects ==
In 1990 Permar worked with Susan Timmins to create the public art project, The Nuclear Roadshow, and from 1992 to 1995 she worked with Wilma Johnson on The Croft Cosy Project. In late 2000 Permar moved to Shetland permanently where she has worked with young people through projects largely focussing on the use of digital media and the Internet, including Fishtastic: The Scalloway Moving Image Project The Sonic Postcards Project for the Sonic Arts Network and Shetlands' Cauld Waaters (2001–02) commissioned by Scottish Natural Heritage. She is a founder member of Veer North, Shetland's Visual Artists group. She created Come and Go (2007, Soundtrack, David Sjoberg), a film for the permanent displays in the new Shetland Museum and Archives. She worked with Nayan Kulkarni to initiate and realise the community based project Mirrie Dancers (2009–2012) which involved over 300 Shetlanders to produce nearly 500 films which formed dynamic light installations for temporary works throughout Shetland (2009–2010) and are permanently cited at Mareel, Shetland's Music, Cinema and Education venue in Lerwick. She worked with 23 of Shetland's finest lace knitters to realise light projections that were exhibited at Bonhoga Gallery in 2010 and are permanently on view in Mareel. From 2012 Permar has worked with Susan Timmins in the collaboration 'Cold War Projects'. In 2021 she began work on the ongoing project Landscape in Pain.

== New Technologies and Underwater Exploration ==
In the late 1990s Permar began to work with sound producing site specific sound installations, such as 'In-take' for a former wine vat in France. In 2000 Permar undertook a Scotland Year of the Artist Residency at Subsea7 in Aberdeen when she began to investigate the relationship between technology and underwater exploration. The residency culminated in a body of work exhibited at The Aberdeen Maritime Museum (2001) and the Shetland Museum (2002). The film, Through the Moonpool, was exhibited in Crossover UK in 2003 and again in Japan in 2005. For Crossover UK 2004 she exhibited The Webnitki, a collection of animations made for the Internet at a Lab Culture residency. The webnitki, are characters who 'knit' their way across the world's continents, 'threading' their way across time and space, land, sea and 'through the moonpool'. The work reflects urban and rural environments, drawing on subject matter related to Permar's experience of living and working in diverse cultures. She invented the word 'webnitki' by combining the English word 'web' with the Russian word 'nitki', meaning 'threads'.

== Participatory and Temporary Public Art Projects ==
Participation and collaboration in temporary public art projects have been an ongoing concern in Permar's practice. Commissions include Echolalia's Walsall Archive for In Memoriam (The New Art Gallery Walsall, 2000–01), Park Matters (London, 2004) and Blueprints, (Newlyn Art Gallery 2005–07). In 2007 she and Susan Timmins created Domestic Dialogues, a collaborative project linking Shetland and St Petersburg, Russia through dialogue, gift-giving and exchange. In 2006 her project, Roseland, combined installation, gift-giving and exchange through exhibitions and events in Shetland, Roydon (near London) and Düsseldorf. Mirrie Dancers is a public art project conceived in collaboration with Nayan Kulkarni using the medium of light and commissioned by Shetland Arts Development Agency for Mareel, Shetland's new music, cinema and education venue. In 2010 she participated in the first International Arts Festival in Baku where local residents helped paint her contribution to the event.

== Teaching and Community Education ==
Throughout her career Permar has worked in art education committed to integrating processes for learning and teaching into her artwork. She has been a lecturer and visiting tutor at colleges throughout the UK, including Saint Martin's School of Art in London, Birmingham City University (formerly University of Central England) and Gray's School of Art, Aberdeen, Scotland, as well as working in schools, community and art gallery education. She has visited art colleges in Russia and the US, was slated to be a visiting professor at Helsinki Academy of Arts in April 2023. Currently she is a Research Fellow at the Centre for Island Creativity, UHI Shetland, where she is Programme Leader for the innovative and highly successful master's degree programme in Art and Social Practice at UHI Shetland (University of the Highlands and Islands). She taught on the BA Hons Degree course in Contemporary Textiles at Shetland College University of the Highlands and Islands from 1991 to 2016, a flagship course which was influential in the development of many knitwear designers in Shetland, with national and international links.
