= Screenplay Film Festival =

Screenplay
- Location: Shetland, Scotland
- Founded: 2006
- Festival date: 30 August 2019 to 9 September 2019
- Website: www.shetlandarts.org/our-work/festivals/screenplay

Screenplay is an international film festival held annually in Shetland, Scotland. The festival is curated by the film critic Mark Kermode and the film historian Linda Ruth Williams in partnership with Shetland Arts. Since 2012 the festival has been hosted by Mareel arts venue in Lerwick.

== History ==
The festival was founded in 2006 after Kermode was asked to help start a festival when appearing at Shetland's Wordplay book festival. When the festival was founded there were no cinemas in Shetland, so screenings were held in a variety of venues across the islands including the Lerwick livestock market, a bus shelter in Unst, village halls and the Garrison Theatre. Since 2012 the festival has been hosted by the purpose built cinema and arts venue Mareel.

In 2017, the festival undertook a cultural exchange with the Charlottetown Film Festival in Charlottetown, Prince Edward Island, Canada, with each festival sending a program of short films by local filmmakers to be screened at the other event.
