= Linda Ruth Williams =

British academic (born 1961)

- Born: 16 April 1961 (age 65); United Kingdom
- Spouse: Mark Kermode (m. 1991)
- Children: 2

Academic background
- Education: University of Sussex
- Thesis: Misogynistic knowledge and the 'cocksure' woman: Freud, Nietzsche and feminism in the interpretation of D.H. Lawrence (1987)

Academic work
- Institutions: University of Exeter
- Main interests: Film studies, sexuality, censorship
- Notable works: The Erotic Thriller in Contemporary Cinema
- Website: humanities.exeter.ac.uk/film/staff/lwilliams

Linda Ruth Williams (born 16 April 1961) is a professor of film studies in the department of Communications (of which she is head), Drama, and Film at the University of Exeter, UK. Her special interests include sexuality and censorship in cinema and literature (she has written widely on pornography, including a book on soft-core cinema), women in film, psychoanalytic theory and D. H. Lawrence.

== Early life and education ==
Williams went to school in Bristol, where she grew up, and followed her English degree at the University of Sussex with an MA in Critical Theory. She earned her PhD from Sussex on Lawrence, Nietzsche, Freud and Feminism.

== Career ==
She has lectured at Liverpool, Manchester and Exeter Universities, and, between 1994 and 2017, at Southampton University. She is currently Professor of Film at the University of Exeter.

She has written several books, including the influential Critical Desire: Psychoanalysis and the Literary Subject and The Erotic Thriller in Contemporary Cinema, and is a regular contributor to the British Film Institute's Sight and Sound magazine, and to radio programmes including Woman's Hour. Her 2006 book, Contemporary American Cinema was co-edited with fellow Southampton lecturer Michael Hammond.

== Personal life ==
She is married to the film critic Mark Kermode, and they have two children. She is co-curator of the annual Shetland Film Festival, Screenplay, run by Shetland Arts, and is a founding organiser of the New Forest Festival.

== Publications ==
=== Books ===
- Williams, Linda R.; Wilcox, Helen; McWatters, Keith; Ann, Thompson (1990). The body and the text: Hélène Cixous: reading and teaching. New York: St. Martin's Press. ISBN 9780312057695.
- Williams, Linda R. (1992). The Twentieth century: a guide to literature from 1900 to the present day. Bloomsbury Guides to Literature Series. London: Bloomsbury Press. ISBN 9780747512875.
- Lawrence, D. H. (1992). Williams, Linda R. (ed.). Women in love. New York: Knopf. ISBN 9780460873222. (With introduction by Williams.)
- Williams, Linda R. (1993). Sex in the head: visions of femininity and film in D.H. Lawrence. Detroit: Wayne State University Press. ISBN 9780814325070.
- Williams, Linda Ruth (1995). Critical desire: psychoanalysis and the literary subject. London & New York: E. Arnold Distributed exclusively in the USA by St. Martinʼs Press. ISBN 9780340568163.
- Williams, Linda Ruth (1997). D.H. Lawrence. Writers and Their Work Series. Plymouth, U.K: Northcote House in association with the British Council. ISBN 9780746307595.
- Williams, Linda Ruth (2005). The erotic thriller in contemporary cinema. Bloomington: Indiana University Press. ISBN 9780253347138.
- Williams, Linda R.; Hammond, Michael (2005). Contemporary American cinema. Maidenhead: Open University Press. ISBN 9781283337885.

=== Book chapters ===
- Williams, Linda Ruth (1989), "Behind the silken-folded mask: Victorian and modern poetry", in Wynne-Davies, Marion (ed.), Bloomsbury guide to English literature: the new authority on English literature, London: Bloomsbury, pp. 253–291, ISBN 9780136896623. (Also wrote numerous reference entries on British Poetry since 1830 for that text.)
- Williams, Linda Ruth (1991), "Critical warfare and Henry Miller's Tropic of Cancer", in Sellers, Susan (ed.), Feminist criticism: theory and practice, Toronto: University of Toronto Press, pp. 23–43, ISBN 9780802069245.
- Williams, Linda Ruth (1992), "Happy families? Feminist transmission and matrilineal thought", in Armstrong, Isobel (ed.), New feminist discourses: critical essays on theories and texts, Routledge Library Editions: Women, Feminism and Literature Series, London New York: Routledge, pp. 48–64, ISBN 9780415067416.

Extracted as: Williams, Linda Ruth (2011), "Happy families? Feminist transmission and matrilineal thought", in Eagleton, Mary (ed.), Feminist literary theory: a reader (3rd ed.), Oxford, UK / Cambridge, Massachusetts, US: Blackwell, pp. 41–44, ISBN 9781405183130.

- Williams, Linda Ruth (1993), "Everything in question: women and film in prospect", in Cook, Pam; Dodd, Philip (eds.), Women and film, A Sight and Sound Reader, Philadelphia: Temple University Press, pp. xxiv–xxix, ISBN 9781566391436.
- Williams, Linda Ruth (1993), "Sisters under the skin: video and blockbuster erotic thrillers", in Cook, Pam; Dodd, Philip (eds.), Women and film: a sight and sound reader, Philadelphia: Temple University Press, pp. 105–114, ISBN 9781566391436.
- Williams, Linda Ruth (1993), "Select bibliography", in Cook, Pam; Dodd, Philip (eds.), Women and film: a sight and sound reader, Philadelphia: Temple University Press, pp. 254–264, ISBN 9781566391436.
- Williams, Linda Ruth (1994), "Select bibliography", in Ledger, Sally; McDonagh, Josephine; Spencer, Jane (eds.), Political gender: texts and contexts, New York London: Harvester Wheatsheaf, pp. 189–203, ISBN 9780745015620.
- Williams, Linda Ruth (1996), "Fiona Banner", in Dodd, Philip; Christie, Ian (eds.), Spellbound, London: British Film Institute Hayward Gallery, pp. 52–59, ISBN 9780851706108.
- Williams, Linda Ruth (1999), "The inside-out of masculinity: David Cronenberg's visceral pleasures", in Aaron, Michele (ed.), The body's perilous pleasures dangerous desires and contemporary culture, Edinburgh: Edinburgh University Press, pp. 30–48, ISBN 9780585159225.
- Williams, Linda Ruth (1999), "Dream girls and mechanic panic: dystopia and its others in Brazil and Nineteen Eighty-Four", in Hunter, I.Q. (ed.), British science fiction cinema, London & New York: Routledge, pp. 153–168, ISBN 9780415168687.
- Williams, Linda Ruth (2000), "Section 2: Arnold Schwarzenegger as spectacle in action (and some Moore): 'Body Talk' by Linda Ruth Williams (November 1997)", in Arroyo, José (ed.), Action/spectacle cinema, A Sight and Sound Reader, London: British Film Institute, pp. 44–50, ISBN 9780851707563.
- Williams, Linda Ruth (2002), "Sex and censoriousness: pornography and censorship in Britain", in Briggs, Adam; Cobley, Paul (eds.), The media: an introduction (2nd ed.), Harlow, England & New York: Pearson Education, pp. 477–495, ISBN 9780582423466.
- Williams, Linda Ruth (2004), "Ready for action: G.I. Jane, Demi Moore's body and the female combat movie", in Tasker, Yvonne (ed.), Action and adventure cinema, London & New York: Routledge, pp. 169–185, ISBN 9780415235075.
- Williams, Linda Ruth (2005), "Twin Peaks: David Lynch and the serial-thriller soap", in Hammond, Michael; Mazdon, Lucy (eds.), The contemporary television series, Edinburgh: Edinburgh University Press, pp. 37–56, ISBN 9780748619016.
- Williams, Linda Ruth (2007), "Dream girls and mechanic panic: dystopia and its others in Brazil and Nineteen Eighty-Four", in Redmond, Sean (ed.), Liquid metal: the science fiction film reader, New York & Chichester, England: Wallflower Press, pp. 64–73, ISBN 9781903364871.

=== Journal articles ===
- Williams, Linda R. (Spring 1989). "Submission and reading: feminine masochism and feminist criticism". New Formations, Modernism / Masochism. 7. Lawrence and Wishart: 9–19. Pdf.
- Williams, Linda R. (July 1990). "Men in feminism". Women: A Cultural Review. 1 (1): 63–65. doi:10.1080/09574049008578023.
- Williams, Linda R. (July 1992). "The Trial of D.H. Lawrence". Critical Survey. 4 (2). Berghahn Books: 154–161. JSTOR 41555646.
- Williams, Linda R. (Summer 1995). "Identity orgies". New Formations, Michel Foucault: J'accuse. 25. Lawrence and Wishart: 123–127. Archived from the original on 17 February 2015.
- Williams, Linda R. (1997). "Body talk: In the new G.I.Jane, Demi Moore shows her muscles as a US Navy SEAL. But is her shape-shifting purely about image control, asks Linda Ruth Williams". Sight & Sound. 7 (11). British Film Institute: 18–22.
- Williams, Linda R. (1997–1998). ""We've Been Forgetting that We're Flesh and Blood, Mother", "Glad Ghosts" and "Uncanny Bodies"". D. H. Lawrence Review. 27 (2&3). Southwest Texas State University: 233–253. (Editors: Howard J. Booth, Elizabeth M. Fox and Fiona Becket.)
- Williams, Linda R. (October 1999). "The edge of the razor". Sight & Sound. British Film Institute: 13–14. (Interview with director Catherine Breillat.)
- Williams, Linda R. (June 2001). "Blood sisters". Sight & Sound. 11 (6). British Film Institute: 36–37.
- Williams, Linda R. (October 2002). "Escape artist". Sight & Sound. British Film Institute: 22–25.
- Williams, Linda R. (March 2003). "Swing high, swing low". Sight & Sound. British Film Institute: 32–33.
- Williams, Linda R. (December 2005). "Songs for swinging lovers". Sight & Sound. British Film Institute.
- Williams, Linda R. (February 2007). "Sleeping with the enemy". Sight & Sound. British Film Institute.
- Williams, Linda R. (July 2007). "Ken Russell: sweet swell of excess". Sight & Sound. British Film Institute.
- Williams, Linda Ruth (Winter 2008). "Speaking of soft core". Cinema Journal. 47 (2): 129–135. doi:10.1353/cj.2008.0013. JSTOR 30137707.
- Williams, Linda R. (March 2009). "Mister Strangelove". Sight & Sound. British Film Institute.
- Williams, Linda Ruth (Winter 2012). "The tears of Henry Thomas Screen". Screen. 53 (4): 459–464. doi:10.1093/screen/hjs051.
