= Mareel =

Entertainment venue in Shetland

Coordinates: 60°9′33″N 1°8′46″W

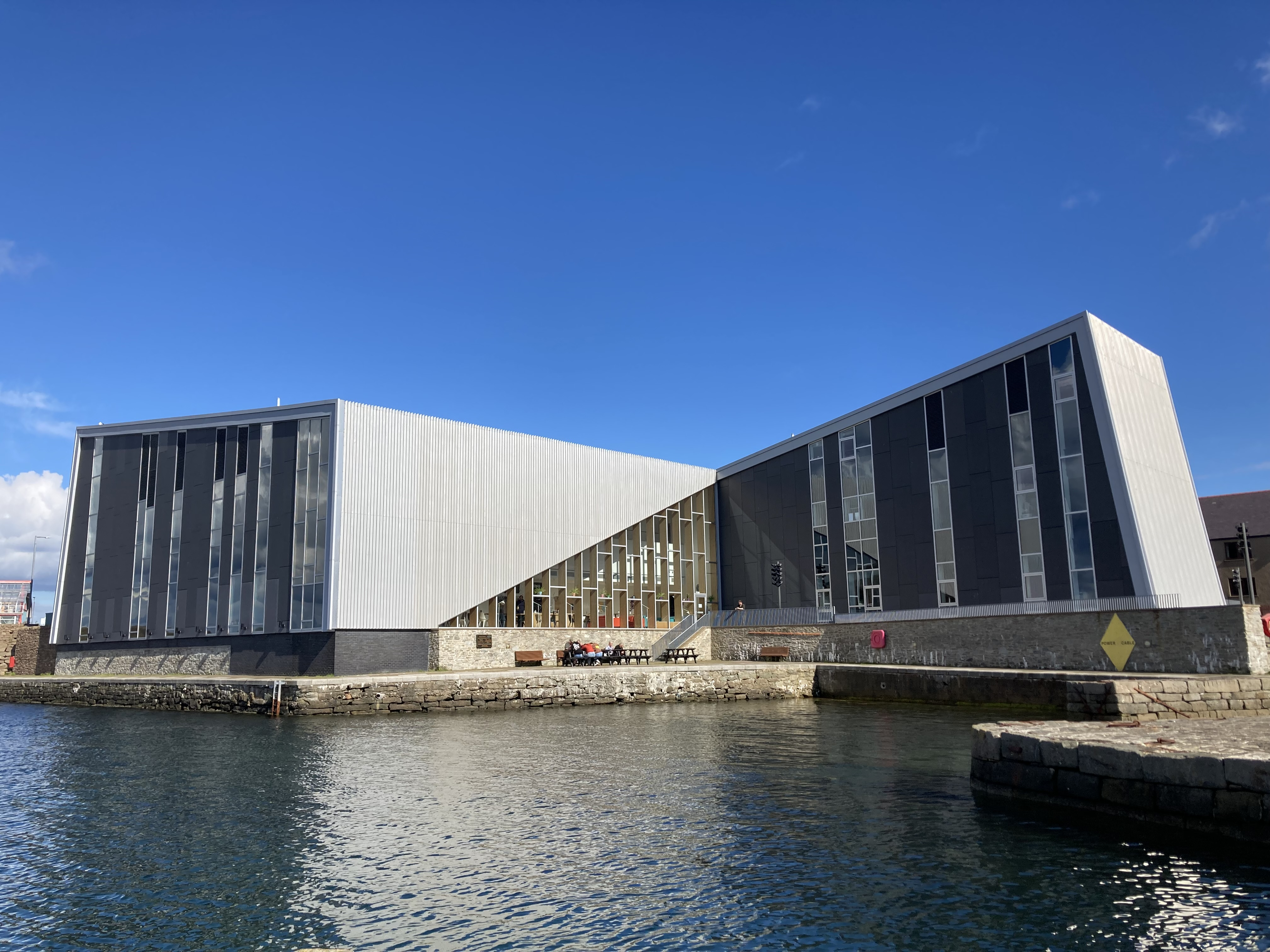
- Interactive map of Mareel
- Location: Lerwick, Shetland, Scotland
- Owner: Shetland Arts
- Type: Music, Cinema, Community education

Construction
- Opened: 25 August 2012

Website
- www.mareel.org

Mareel is a multi-purpose entertainment venue located on the waterfront of Lerwick, the capital of Shetland. Opening in 2012, the facility includes a music venue, a cinema, conference rooms and educational facilities.

== Facilities ==
Mareel is designed as a multi use venue and hub for the creative industries. The site is near the new Shetland Museum and Archives in Lerwick. Shetland Arts are the lead agency behind the project, Gareth Hoskins were the architects and D.I.T.T. the building contractors. The name means "phosphorescence on the ocean".

The main performance auditorium has a standing capacity of about 650 and a seated capacity of around 250, with a balcony seating a further 85 people. There are 2 screening areas. The main cinema has a seated capacity of around 160 with a smaller second cinema seating around 40.

The recording studio has a control room and live area. The split level cafe bar incorporates additional performance areas. The rehearsal area(s) have sprung floors making them suitable for music and dance use. The multi media production suite has facilities for film, TV, music, graphics and website production.

Shetland College UHI began delivering music courses in Mareel in the 2012/13 academic year.

== History ==
Timeline of key dates in the project's history

1989	The North Star, Shetland's only cinema closes (but remains open as a music venue)
1996	Steering group set up to campaign for a new cinema
1997	Shetland Island's Council commissions a study into the desirability of a cinema. The result is positive; Shetland Arts Trust commissions a report by Katherine Campbell on the potential for music development in Shetland. The need for a purpose-built venue is identified
1998	Shetland Islands Council commissions report on the desirability of a music venue in Shetland following the raising of a notice of motion
1999	Shetland Arts Trust commissions report on desirability of a cinema in Shetland, presented to the Shetland Islands Council. The result is positive
2000	Shetland Arts Trust produces an updated report into desirability of a dedicated music venue for Shetland; Public meeting held in Lerwick's Town Hall and a steering group appointed to campaign for a new music venue
2001	Shetland Islands Council commissions report into feasibility of 3 separate options: Standalone cinema, standalone music venue or a combined use building. The latter is chosen due to savings on construction and running costs. The two steering groups are merged into one
2003	Shetland Islands Council commissions report on socio-economic impact of the music business in Shetland. Concludes that in 2002 the music industry was worth over £6 million to the local economy; Cinema and music venue entered onto Shetland Islands Council's capital programme as an unfunded item (no funding is yet committed)
2004	Shetland Islands Council commissions report into socio-economic impact of a cinema and music venue in Shetland. Concludes that 35 full-time equivalent jobs could be created with an extra £1.5 million injected into Shetland's economy; Shetland Islands Council commits £4.62 million to project requiring a 'Project Team' to find external funding. The project team is drawn from representative of Shetland Islands Council and Shetland Arts Trust; Project team submits stage 1 application to Scottish Arts Council National Lottery Fund. The design is estimated to cost £6.9 million. Shetland Islands Council pledges a further £261,000 for development work should the application be successful
2005	Scottish Arts Council National Lottery Fund stage 1 application successful provisionally granting £2.12 million on the condition that the building incorporates a 2nd cinema screen; Project Team commission independent business case review, reported to the Shetland Islands Council. Review indicates that an annual deficit of £87,000 can be expected
2006	Shetland Arts Development Agency formed from the Shetland Arts Trust. Part of the remit is to take forward the Mareel project, and the management of Weisdale Mill and Garrison Theatre. Gwilym Gibbons appointed as the organisations first Director.
2007	(April) Project team submit Stage 2 application to the Scottish Arts Council National Lottery Fund. Building estimated to cost £8.75 million; (August) Lottery Fund delay decision pending further information; (August) Project Team make applications to various grant giving bodies to secure extra funding
2008	(March) Lottery Fund awards £2.12 to the project, now estimated to cost £9.3 million following sharp increase in building material costs and potential to include a second floor in the existing roof void; (April) Shetland Islands Council grants planning permission; (May) Shetland Islands Council vote to review commitment to project; (June) Shetland Islands Council vote to continue support; (August) Highlands and Islands Enterprise award £965,000; (August) Shetland Islands Council's Development Trust award £965,000; (October) D.I.T.T., a Shetland construction company, are announced as the preferred contractors; (December) European Regional Development Fund announce £2.8 million project funding
2009	(April) Construction contract between Shetland Arts and D.I.T.T. signed; (May) Construction begins
2010	Work progresses on schedule, with assertions from Shetland Arts and D.I.T.T. that the project is "on time and on budget"
2011	(January) D.I.T.T. announce that "severe weather" across the UK in November and December 2010 has adversely affected the building program and the opening date will be delayed by several weeks (summer 2011 opening now expected); (March) D.I.T.T. announce that their cladding sub-contractors have gone into administration causing further delays to the build programme; (June) Mareel awarded drinks licence; (June) Shetland Arts announce that Mareel will be taking provisional bookings from March 2012 onwards but that an opening date had still not been agreed with D.I.T.T; (October) Creative Scotland announce further capital investment to aid the development of Shetland Arts' / creative industry office space within the building, believing the project to be of "national and international significance"; (December) DITT "confirm" that it will hand the building over to Shetland Arts in late April 2012 with an opening date forecast for three weeks later
2012	(January) Shetland Arts express "disappointment" of being informed of further delays by DITT (with a handover date now expected in May 2012), and "great concern" having previously received "multiple assurances of completion dates followed by notification of delays". DITT respond by claiming that "a number of significant changes have been instructed" by the design team which "impact(ed) on the completion date."; (May) Shetland Arts announce partnerships with local and national promoters including DF Concerts, organisers of events such as T in the Park; (June) The first music acts to play at Mareel are programmed for August 2012; (August) The first music event took place on 25 August – a concert in the main auditorium by NYJOS; (November) The official opening ceremony was held on 17 November

== Finance ==
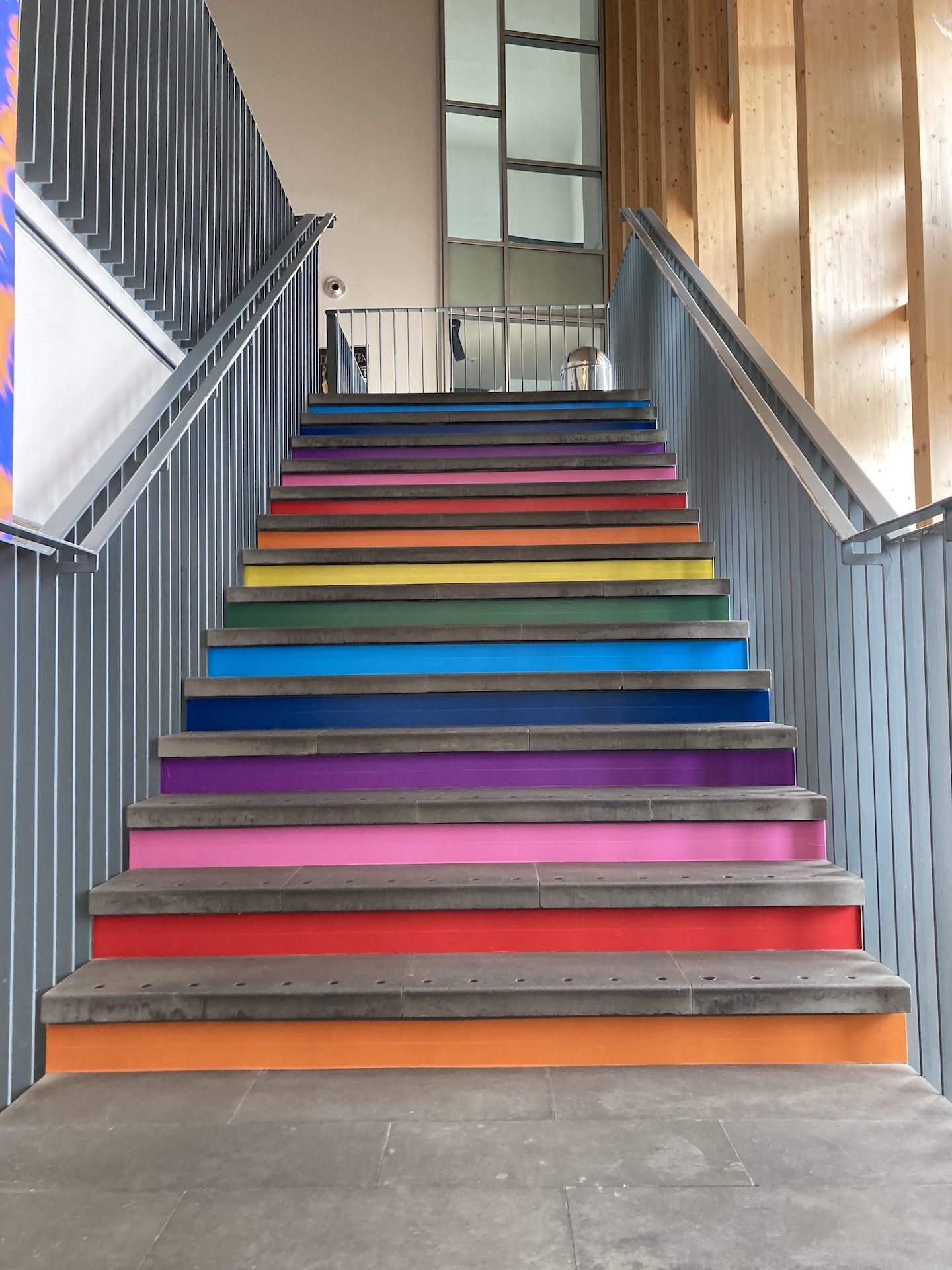
Stairs inside Mareel

Mareel has attracted finance from sources including

- £5,190,000 – Shetland Islands Council
- £2,800,000 – European Regional Development Fund
- £2,120,000 – Scottish Arts Council lottery fund
- £965,000 – Highlands and Islands Enterprise
- £965,000 – Shetland Development Trust
- £50,000 – Gannochy Trust

== Controversy ==
Opinions on Mareel are split amongst many in Shetland

Motivations for building Mareel include the development of the music, film and creative industries, tourism, educational opportunities, job creation and the provision of leisure and education facilities for the community, particularly young people.

Some local businesses, particularly Lerwick pub and night club owners via the Shetland Licensed Trade Association, claimed that Mareel would negatively affect their profits and an anonymous State Aid complaint was submitted to the European Commission on 17 July 2008. Shetland Arts countered these claims by providing evidence that Mareel would "generate activity and vitality into the night-time economy of Lerwick, to the benefit of all including the local hoteliers, publicans and restaurants". The State Aid complaint was not upheld.

Another source of concern was Mareel's business plan which detractors claim is unrealistic, particularly in terms of revenue raised from sales at the cafe bar. However, the business plan has been reviewed and approved by funders. Highlands and Islands Enterprise commissioned an Economic Impact Study which highlighted outcomes including the creation of 52 jobs and a positive impact on population retention of young people – an HIE Youth Migration Study identified the "creative industries as one of the most important sectors in encouraging young people to stay in or return to Shetland."

Some detractors have claimed that the capital funds allocated to Mareel would have better been spent on other projects, such as to avert the closure of rural schools, apparently under the misapprehension that the funders' capital could have been diverted to bail out the Shetland Islands Council Education revenue budget which had been overspent for many years.

== Shetland Islands Council support ==
In 2008 the Shetland Islands Council voted to review their support for Mareel even though they had agreed their support on number of previous occasions and had "already spent around £750,000 on Mareel and previously committed itself to spending a further £4.5m from its capital programme.". The council voted 15:7 to commission a business plan review and re-vote six weeks later.

The Shetland Islands Council's finance officials reported the business plan to be "robust" and "well researched", but that costings estimates were "light" and audience and income targets "challenging".

The result of the subsequent vote on Wednesday 25 June was in favour of continuing support for Mareel. Due to a 9:9 split convener Sandy Cluness used his casting vote and is reported to have said "As far as I am concerned you can go ahead and build Mareel" as he delivered his decision, to "cheers of delight and lengthy applause from the 40 or so supporters" who were present in the council chambers.

Despite the vote "a few councillors (were) apparently unable to accept the democratic decision." West Mainland councillor Gary Robinson called into question the convener's handling of the vote stating "I think Sandy (the convenor) has won a battle, but the war isn’t over yet" and that he and other opponents (including Alison Duncan who had 6 weeks previously expressed his desire to "place a bomb" under Mareel and Jonathan Wills, a one time supporter of Mareel) would be considering their options in the coming weeks. This group continue to voice their opposition

Councillor Alan Wishart, who had voted against Mareel, reflected the majority view that the vote had been handled "properly and fairly" stating it had been "pretty intense, but a reasoned debate and I’m content with that... It was very reasonable on both sides and democracy had its say."

== Music industry ==
Most of Lerwick's music venues and clubs closed during the 1990s and 2000s including the North Star, LK Sound Factory (Jubilee), Somewhaur Else, Ferry Inn (converted to Beltrami's but no longer featuring live music), Mooney's Wake and Baroc, and Mareel is seen by many as a positive development for the local live music scene.

Mareel's recording facilities are also considered to be an important development for the local industry, for both commercial and educational uses.

== Public art ==
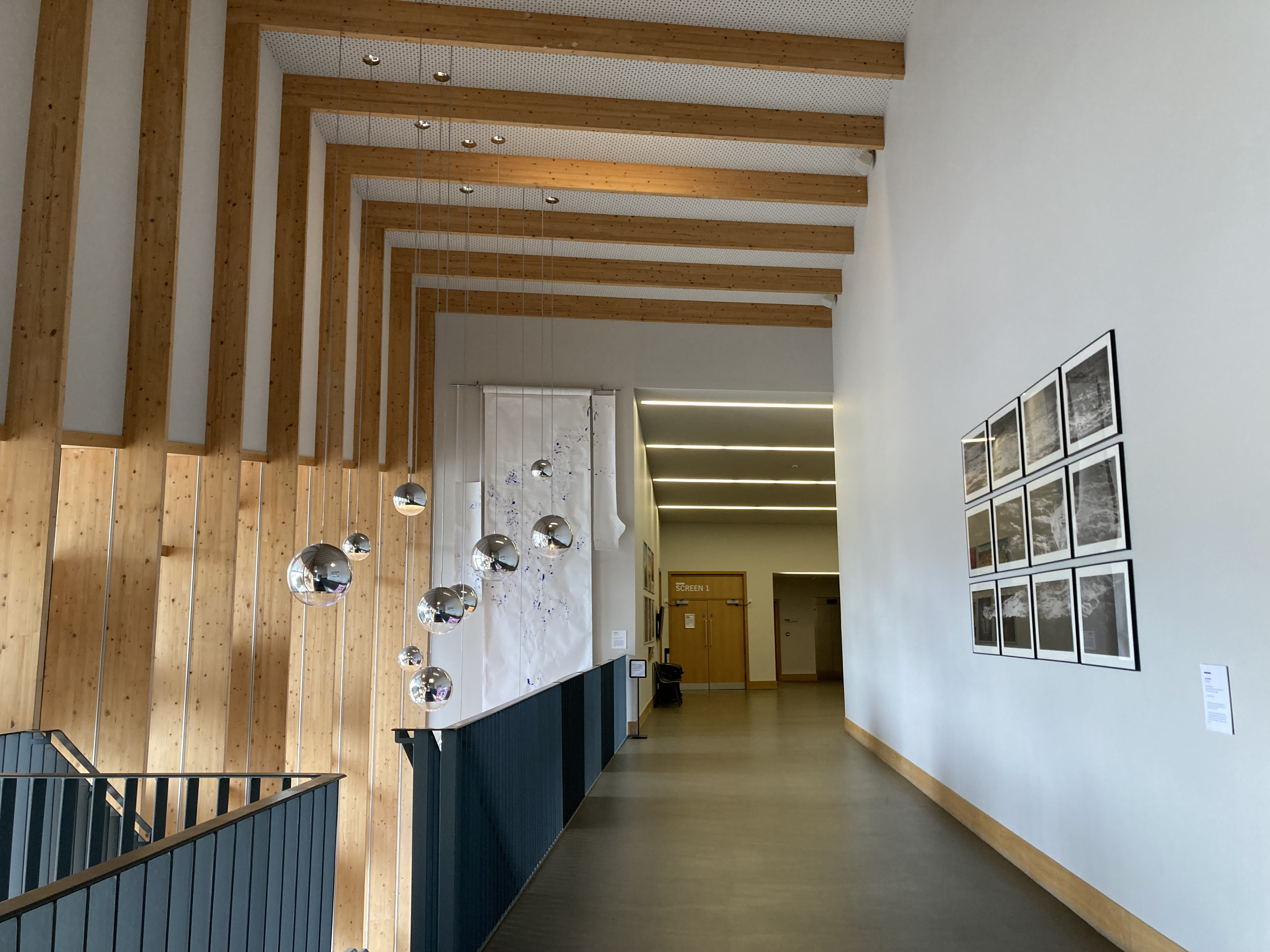
Upper floor

Artists Nayan Kulkarni and Roxane Permar were commissioned by Shetland Arts Development Agency to create public art for the building using the medium of light. They conceived the project, Mirrie Dancers, which involved members of the community and Shetland Lace knitters in the process of making work which will become part of the permanent installation at Mareel.
