= Hoy, Shetland =

Coordinates: 60°11′14″N 1°19′36″W

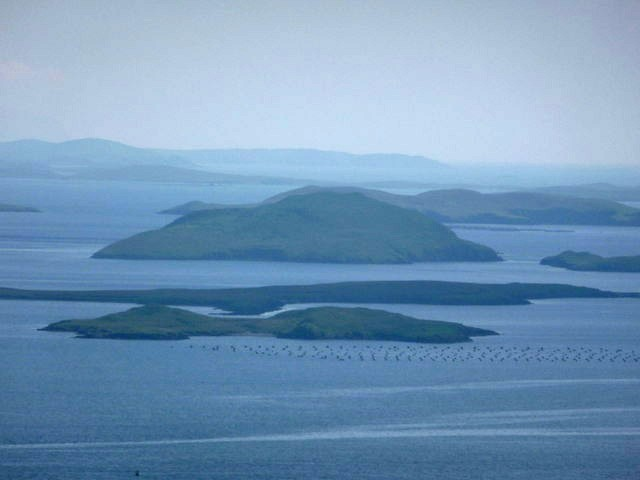
The island of Hoy, with the low-lying islands of Greena and Flotta in the foreground

Hoy (Háey, Old Norse for 'high island') is a small island in Weisdale Voe, an arm of the sea in the Shetland islands, Scotland. Nearby are the smaller islets of Hoggs of Hoy and Junk. The Sound of Hoy lies between Hoy and Strom Ness peninsula on the Shetland Mainland. The highest point of the island is 35 metres above sea level.
