= Gwilym Gibbons =

British arts leader

Gwilym Meredith Lloyd Gibbons
- Born: April 8, 1971 (age 55)
- Occupation: artist
- Board member of: Cultural Enterprise Office

Gwilym Meredith Lloyd Gibbons (born 8 April 1971) is a British arts leader who is notable for leading the political struggle, fundraising and development of the £13.5m Mareel in Shetland, the UK's most northerly music, cinema and creative industries centre. Mareel officially opened in November 2012, 18 months behind schedule and £1.5 million over budget after a protracted dispute with the main contractors. He was the first director of Shetland Arts Development Agency, leaving after 8 years in post in September 2014 to set up Creative Help, a new consultancy agency.

Gibbons was also one of the nine inaugural board members of Creative Scotland. He was made an honorary fellow of the University of the Highlands and Islands in September 2014 for his outstanding contribution to the arts and education.

Gibbons grew up in intentional communities throughout the UK in the 1970s and 1980s. He has commented widely on his childhood upbringing, including appearances on BBC Radio 4's Woman's Hour and Off the Page.

Gibbons took up the role of chair of the Cultural Enterprise Office in July 2014 and became chief executive of Horsecross Arts in January 2015, where as well as running Perth Concert Hall Gibbons led on the redevelopment of the historic Perth Theatre, a major £16m refurbishment plus new build project in the heart of Perth, Scotland. Perth Theatre re-opened in November 2017. According to Magnus Linklater CBE, the chair of Horsecross Arts, Gibbons was "instrumental in helping deliver our brilliant new theatre within budget and on schedule. Gibbons stepped down from his role as Chief Executive of Horsecross Arts after the successful re-launch of the Theatre in December 2018 to take up a new role as Chief Executive of The Crichton Trust in Dumfries, Scotland.

Gibbons is also the chair of the Board of the Cultural Enterprise Office, an agency providing business support and advice to the creative industries in Scotland

In 2025, Gibbons was appointed CEO of Dynamic Earth, a science centre in Edinburgh.
