= New Holland Island =

Island in Russia

Native name: Новая Голландия
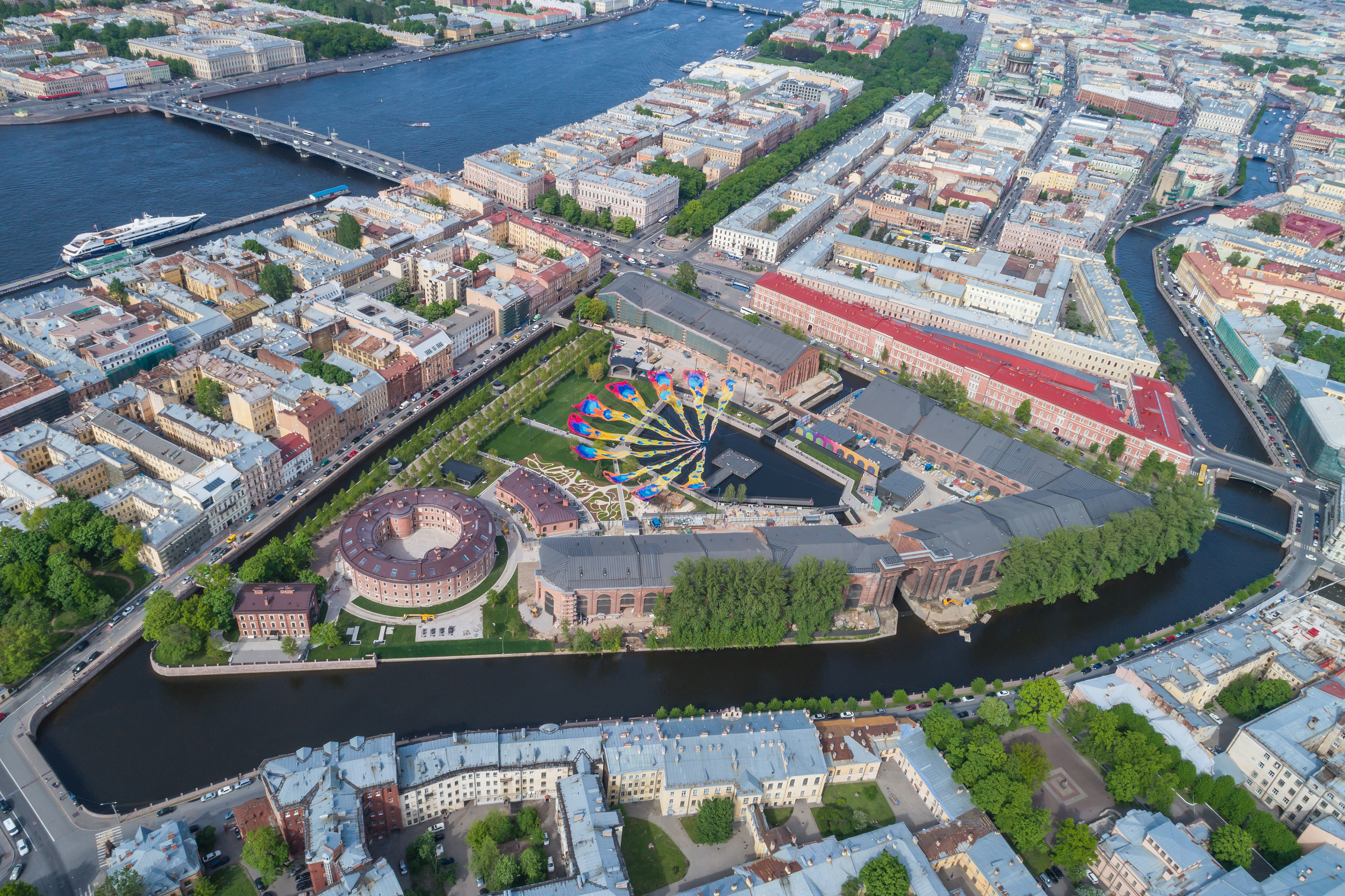
- Interactive map of New Holland Island

Geography
- Location: Saint Petersburg, Russia
- Coordinates: 59.929°N 30.290°E
- Area: 8 ha (20 acres)

Administration
- Russia

New Holland Island (Russian: Но́вая Голла́ндия) is a historic triangular artificial island in central Saint Petersburg, Russia, dating from the 18th century. It is also known as Admiralty Island.

== Construction ==
The island was created in 1719, when the newly built Kryukov Canal and Admiralty Canal connected the Moika River with the Neva. The triangular island took its name after a number of canals and shipbuilding facilities that rendered its appearance similar to Amsterdam. The island was originally built for timber storage. Peter the Great took the opportunity to create a naval port, including a wooden palace for his own use. In 1721, it became the country's first military port.

== Military property ==
For almost two centuries the island belonged to the Russian Admiralty, which adapted the area for its various needs. Originally, there was a minor shipyard for rowing boats. In 1732 the Admiralty engaged architect Ivan Korobov to construct a network of basins and wooden warehouses along the island's perimeter in order to store lumber for shipbuilding.

In 1765 Savva Chevakinsky was ordered to rebuild the warehouses in brick, but without the customary stucco decoration. By 1788, when the project halted, Jean-Baptiste Vallin de la Mothe had designed and supervised the construction of a highly pitched Neoclassical arch over the canal connecting the Moika with the inner basin (the "Kovsh", Russian: Ковш). This magnificent red-brick gateway to the island, known as the New Holland Arch, is flanked by massive Tuscan columns of red granite.

New Holland did not achieve its present appearance until the building of a naval prison in 1828–29 and a basin for naval architects in 1893. Aleksei Krylov used this basin for testing new models of ships between 1900 and 1908. The General Staff of the Navy constructed the most powerful radio station in Imperial Russia there in 1915.

After the 1917 Russian Revolution, the 18th-century buildings of New Holland Island fell into neglect. From 1918 to 2004 the Red Army and the Russian Ground Forces used the island as a mixed-use facility.

== 2000s revival ==
On Navy Day in 2000, New Holland was opened to the public for the emplacements project (1997–2000), an art project created by artists Françoise Dupré and Roxane Permar with support from Russian artists, including Lyudmila Belova and Tatyana Nikolaenko, involving over two dozen artists altogether.

In 2004, the Ministry of Defense evacuated the buildings, which were to be refurbished for hotels and clubs to a design by Norman Foster, Baron Foster of Thames Bank, until the consortium running the project ran into difficulties.

Since 2010, the island is owned by the Iris Foundation (Daria Zhukova's art foundation). A new project was established with space for galleries and a museum, possibly to house Abramovich's art collection. The $12-billion-dollar redevelopment project was awarded to NY-based architecture firm WORKac. The island opened to the public in 2011. The planned £256m complex is intended to combine commercial and residential properties with the restoration of monuments that are protected by UNESCO.

While very similar to the plans made by Fosters + Partners in 2006, the firm WORKac designed the new island as a microcosm of St-Petersburg, a concept of "city within the city".

A branch of the Centre of Contemporary Art (based in Moscow) is also planned.

In 2016, the restoration of the former blacksmith building (the foundry), the administrative building (the commandant's house) and the old naval prison was launched. A playground and a communal herb garden were also planned. An ice skating rink was planned to be installed during winters on the central lawn. Those new additions are to be completed by 2025.

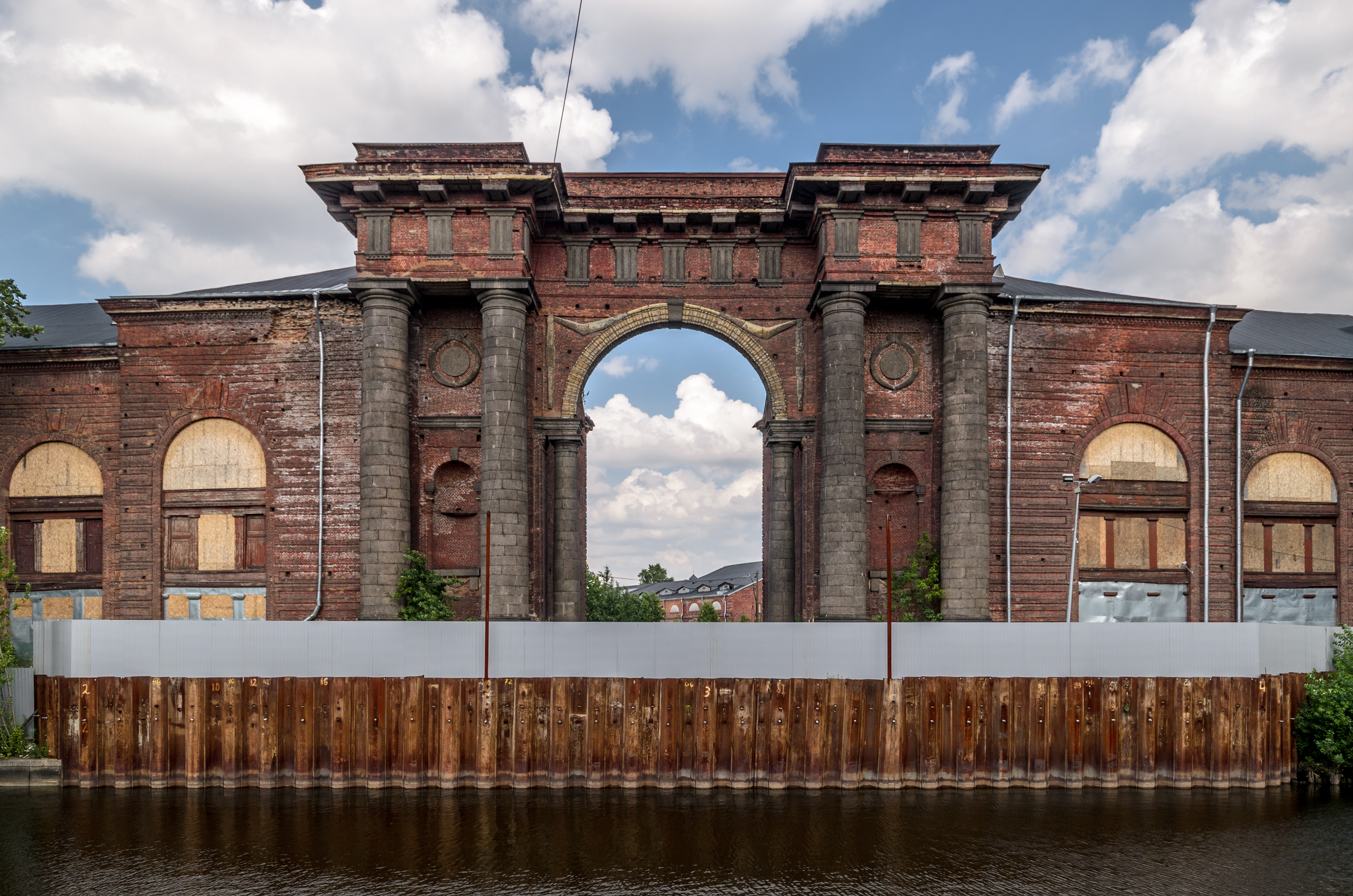
New Holland Island Arch in Saint Petersburg

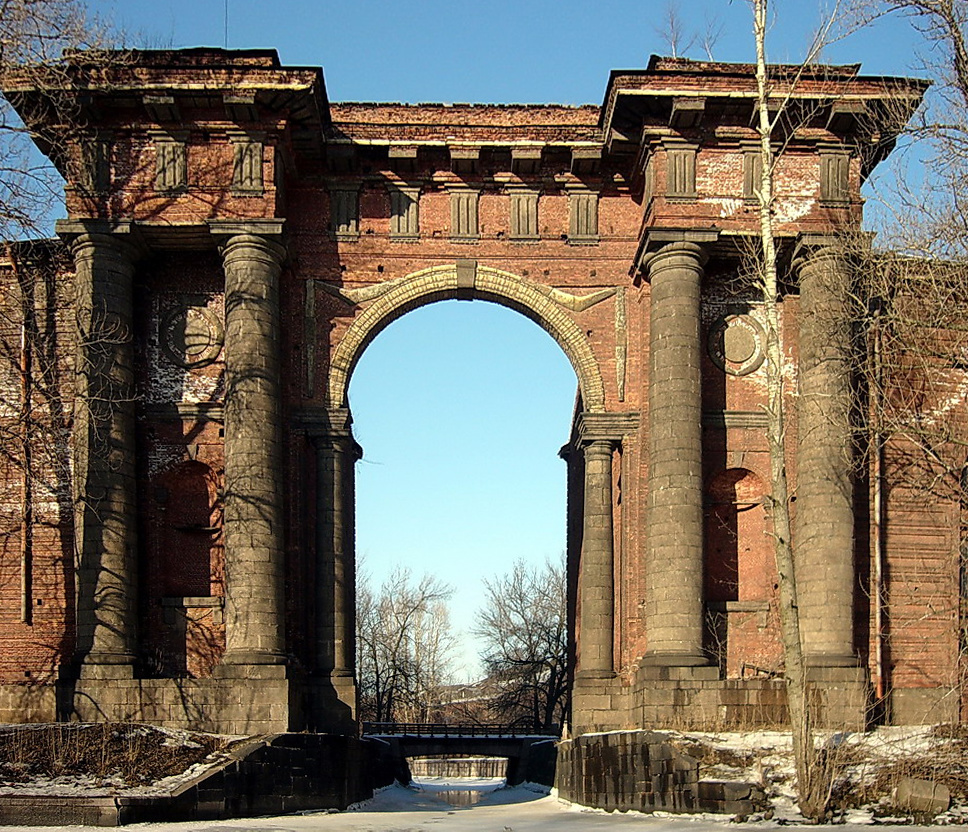
New Holland Arch

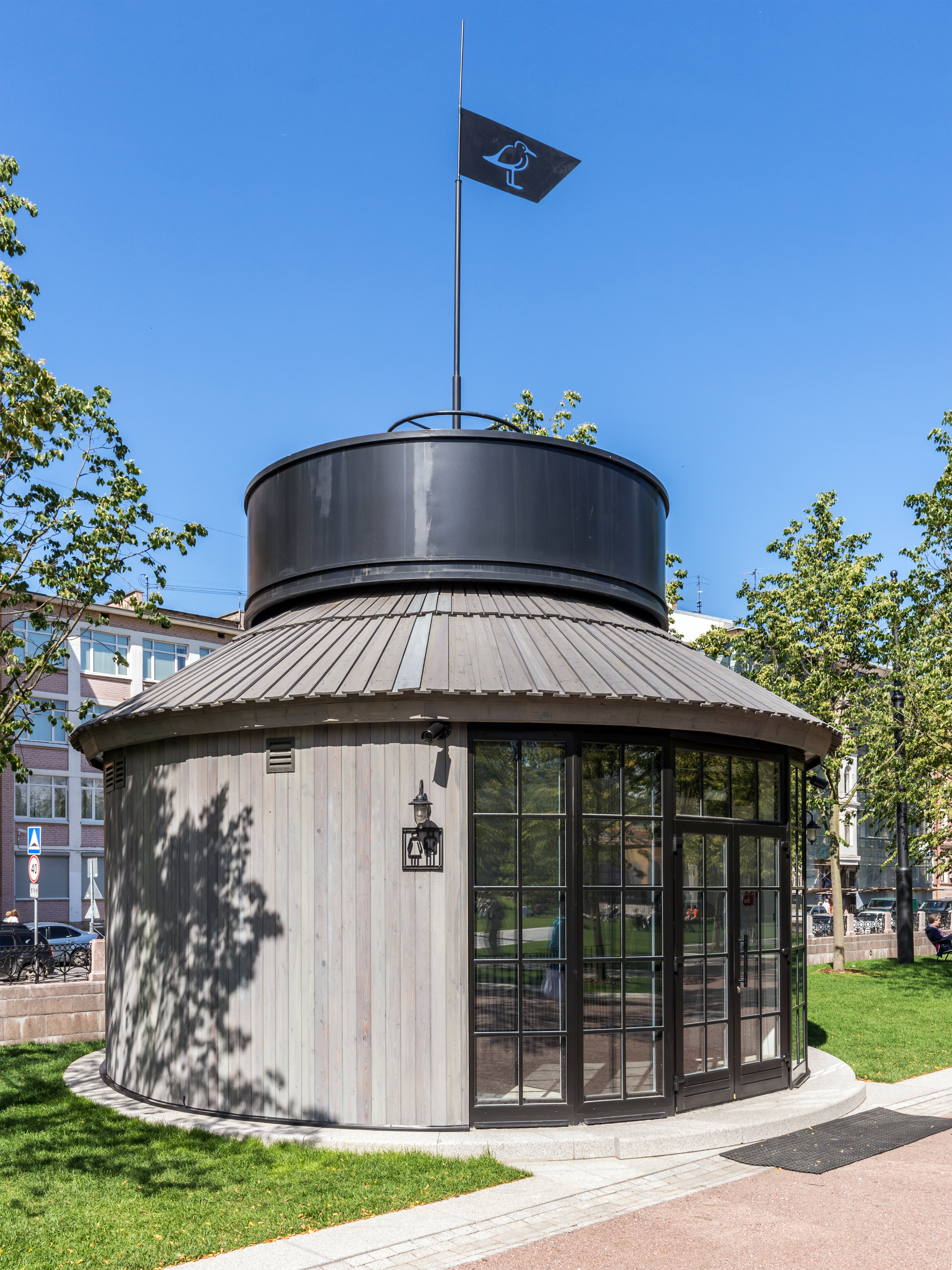

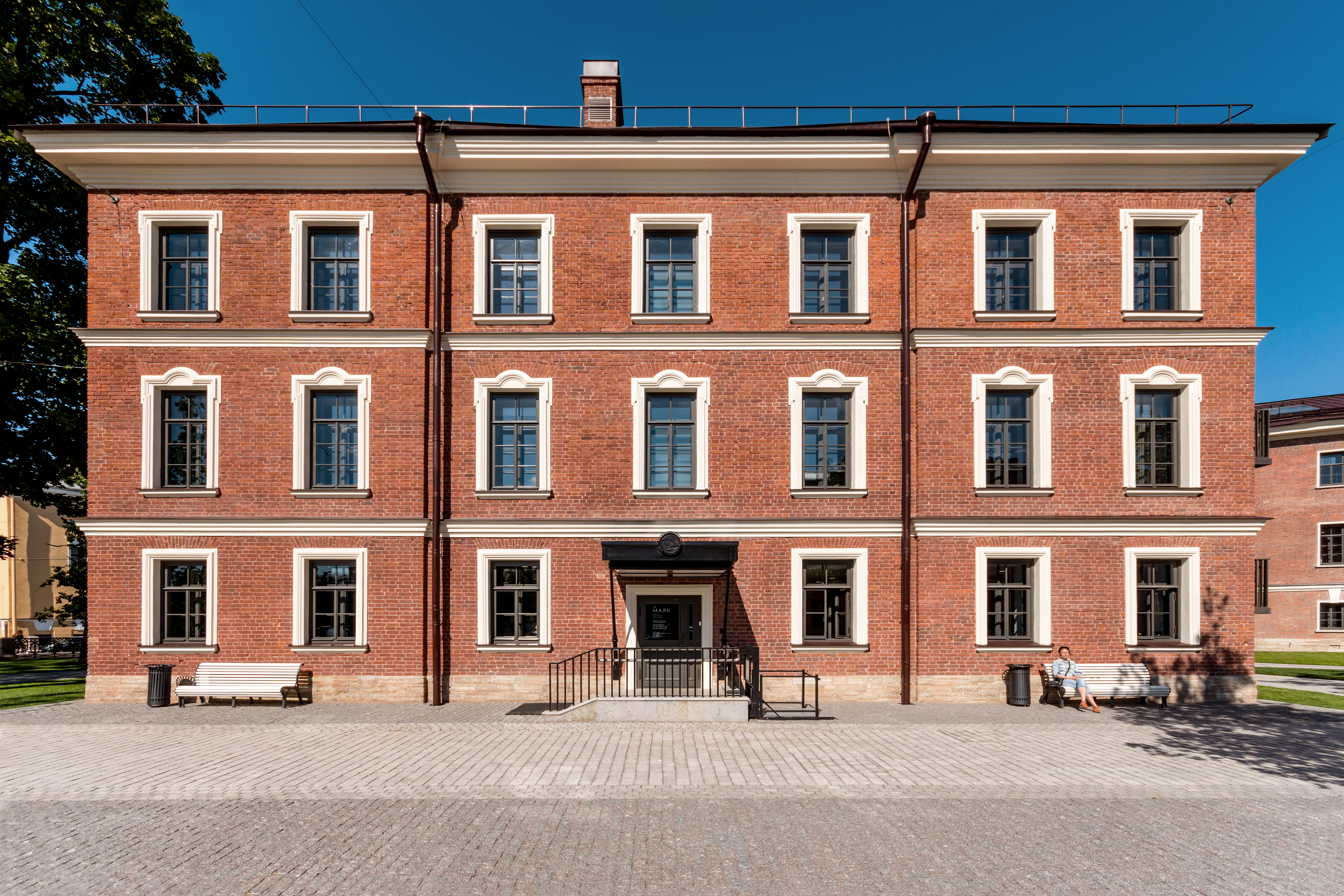
The Commandant's House

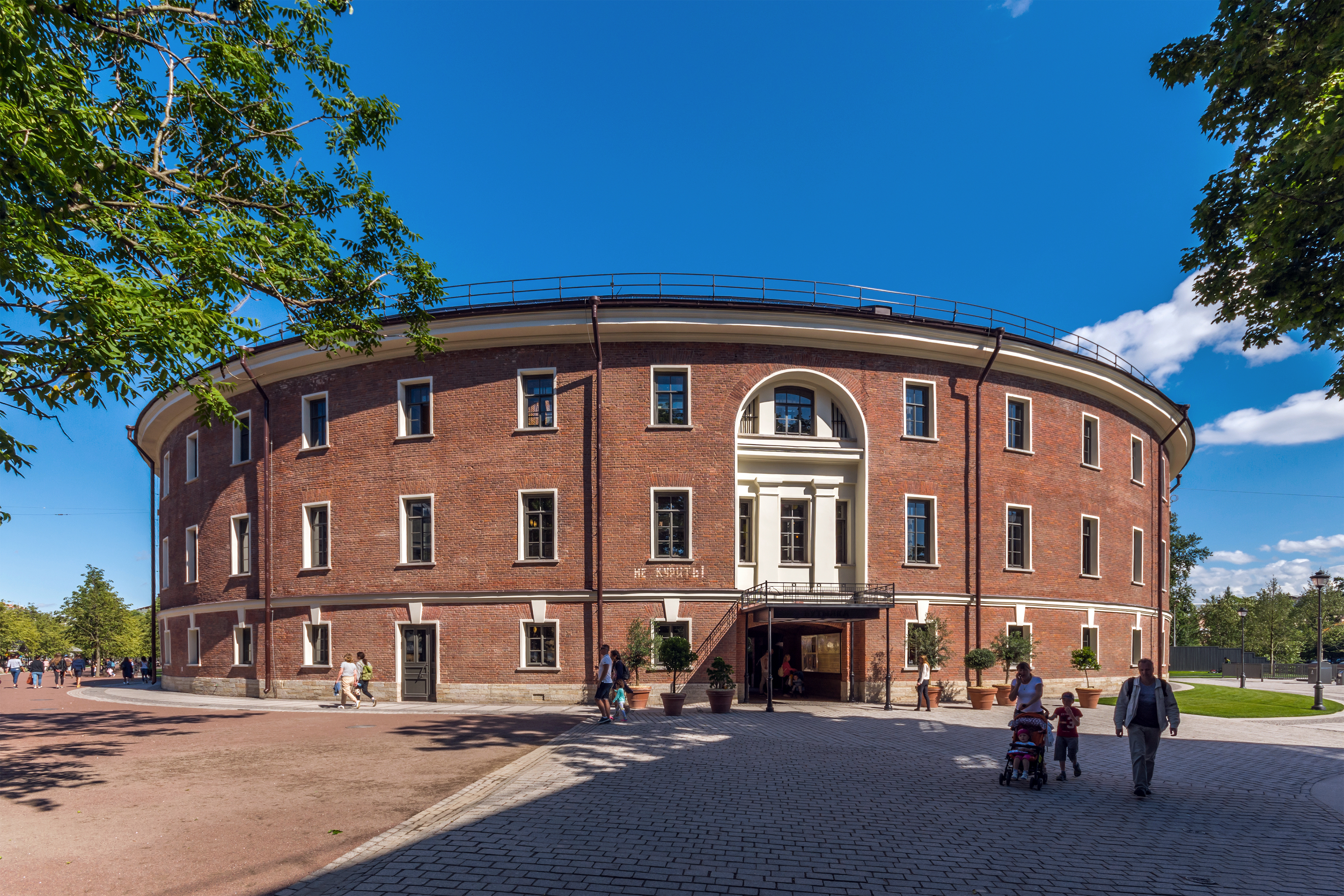
The Bottle House – former military prison

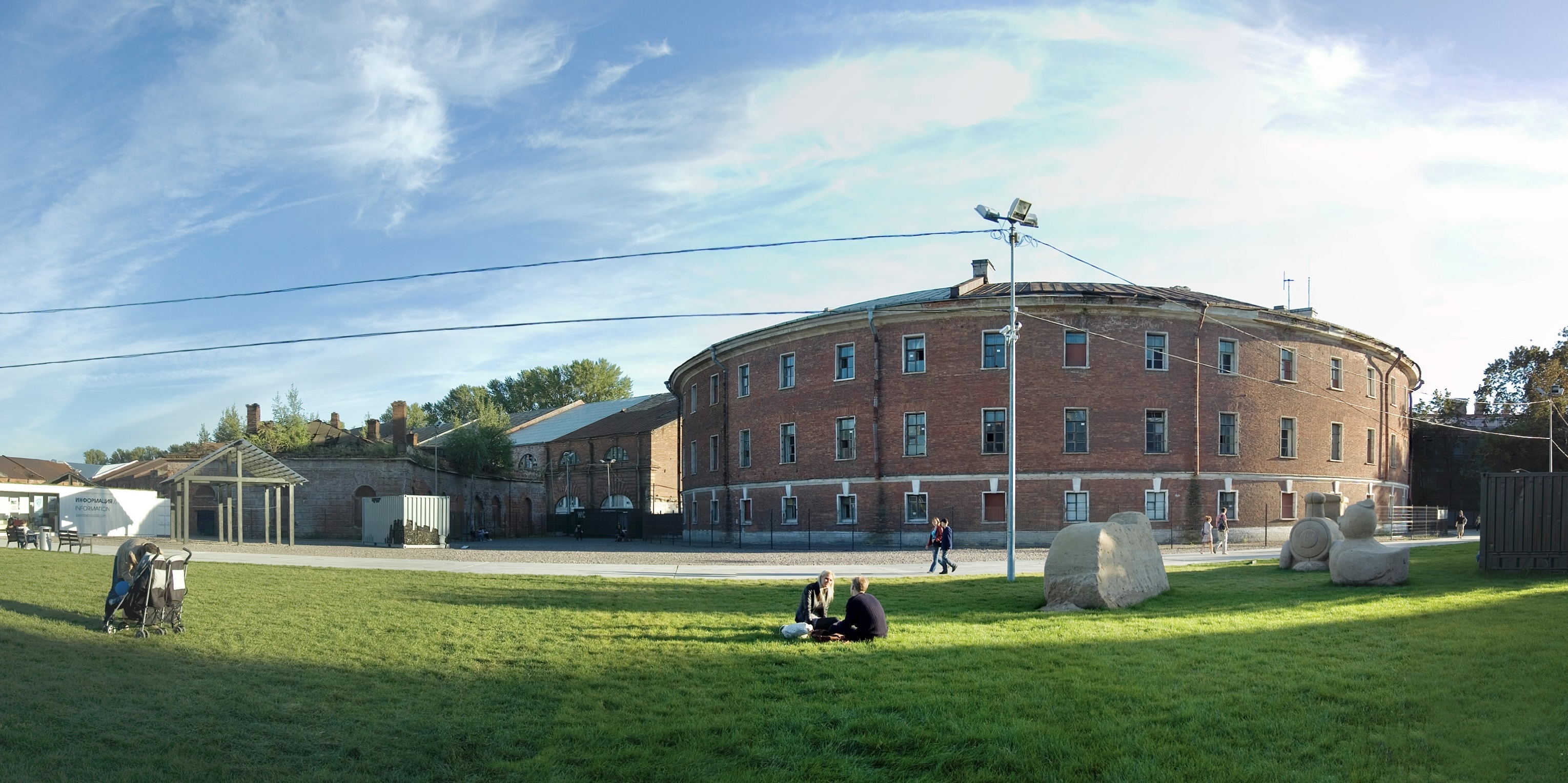
The former naval prison

== Bibliography ==
- Brumfield, William C. (1997). Landmarks of Russian Architecture. UK: Routledge. ISBN 90-5699-537-5.
