= Weisdale =

Coordinates: 60.267°N 1.286°W

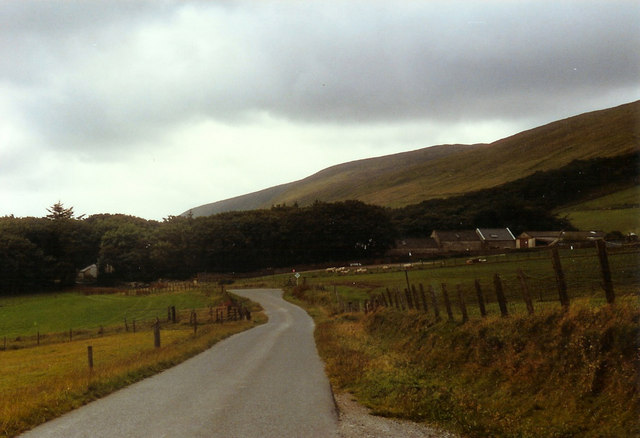
- Kergord "Forest", one of the few woods in Shetland

- Location within Shetland
- OS grid reference: HU394537
- Civil parish: Tingwall
- Council area: Shetland
- Lieutenancy area: Shetland
- Country: Scotland
- Sovereign state: United Kingdom
- Post town: SHETLAND
- Postcode district: ZE2
- Dialling code: 01595
- Police: Scotland
- Fire: Scottish
- Ambulance: Scottish
- UK Parliament: Orkney and Shetland
- Scottish Parliament: Shetland

Weisdale (Shaetlan pronunciation: [ˈwiːzdəɫ] WEEZ-dəl) is a bay, hamlet and ancient parish on Mainland in Shetland, Scotland. The bay opens near the northern extremity of Scalloway Bay, and strikes four and a half miles to the north north east.

The hamlet lies at the bay's head, about twelve miles north west of Lerwick.

== History ==
Weisdale was the scene of a series of evictions of crofters in favour of large scale sheep farming in the 19th century. Approximately three hundred and eighteen crofters were evicted from the Weisdale valley in what is described as the clearances. Local author John J. Graham wrote two novels on this theme.

== Sites of Interest ==
- Weisdale Voe - a lovely and long stretch of water containing small isles (Greena, Flotta, Hoy, North Havra, Junk, Hoggs of Hoy and Hildasay). The head is a good place to see wading birds.
- Weisdale Valley - a beautiful stretch of land including the Weisdale Mill, Kergord Woods & Kergord House that are detailed below. The remains of some of the houses that were targeted during the clearances in the 19th century can still be seen in the valley today.
- Weisdale Mill - a restored mill (Shetland's largest corn mill, built in 1855) now serving as a gallery and cafe.
- Kergord Woods - the only substantial woodland in the Shetland Islands, located at Weisdale. Mixed conifer and deciduous trees were planted between 1909–21 and now attracts woodland birds.
- Kergord House - built in 1850, was previously part of the Flemington estate (the house itself was originally called Flemington) and in 1940 the house served as the Headquarters for the Shetland Bus operations
- Shetland Jewellery – The workshop premises in Weisdale are open to visitors who can see silver and gold jewellery with Nordic, traditional and wildlife designs being produced by the skilled workers. Teas, coffees and light snacks are available.

== Church ==
There is one church in Weisdale. It is known as the Weisdale Kirk and is part of the Church of Scotland. This kirk was built in 1863 and is now surrounded by a beautiful garden which was created by local volunteers with the assistance of the BBC Scotland Beechgrove Garden team. The garden won a Shetland Environmental Award in 2006
