= Flotta, Shetland =

Island off of Mainland, Shetland, Scotland

Coordinates: 60.19846°N 1.32545°W

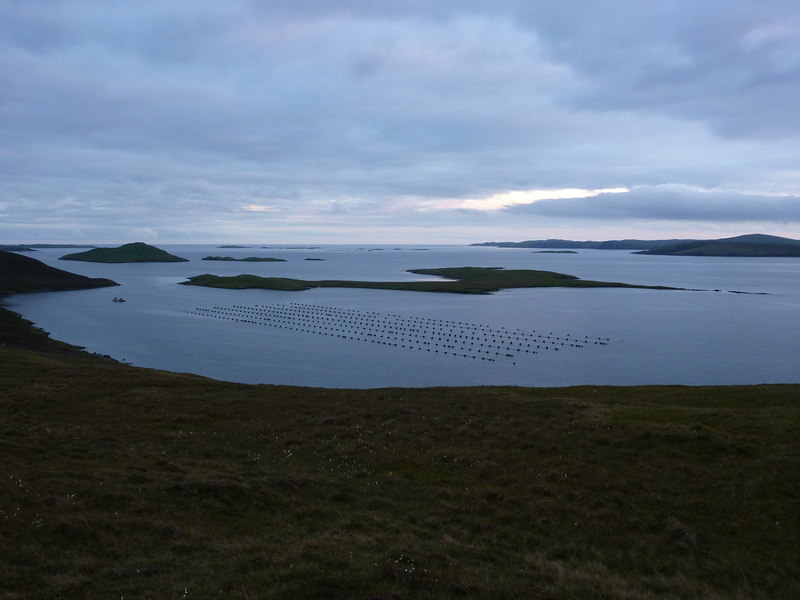
Flotta seen from the east

Flotta (grid reference HU375462) is an island off the south west of Mainland, Shetland. The name may come from the Old Norse, flatey meaning flat island, and the island's highest point is only ten metres. It is in Weisdale Voe, and is to the south of Greena.
