= Robert Colls =

British academic

Robert Colls is Emeritus Professor of History at De Montfort University, Leicester.

== Early life ==
He was born in 1949 in South Shields, where he attended Laygate Lane Junior School and the Grammar-Technical School for Boys. His father worked as a driller at the Tyne Dock Engineering Company, a ship repair yard. His mother worked at Harton Hospital as a ward assistant. He has a younger brother.

After studying at the University of Sussex and undertaking Voluntary Service Overseas in Blue Nile Province, Sudan, he earned his PhD at the University of York under Professor G. A. Williams.

== Career ==
He worked at Loughton College (1975–79), and then at the University of Leicester (1979-2012), as Professor of English History before, in October 2012, joining the International Centre for Sports History and Culture at De Montfort University, also in Leicester.

== Main interests ==
Colls's main interests are cultural and intellectual history. He has also worked on the history of the English working class. His essay "When We Lived in Communities" (Cities of Ideas Routledge 2004) explored the intelligence that sustained industrial communities. This, and his "English Journeys" (Prospect July 2007) and "Death of a Church" (New Statesman 20 Mar 2024), are the nearest he has come to memoir.

== Publications ==
Colls's first book The Collier's Rant (Croom Helm 1977) explored popular song and image as expressed in 19th-century broadsheets and music hall. The Pitmen of the Northern Coalfield 1790-1850 (Manchester U P 1987) tracked the history of the early miners' unions in Northumberland and Durham. Geordies: Roots of Regionalism (Edinburgh U P 1992) is a collection of essays edited by Colls and Bill Lancaster at a crucial moment in the region's de-industrialization. Newcastle upon Tyne: A Modern History (Phillimore 2001), and Northumbria: History and Identity 547-2000 (History Press 2007) carried on the northern themes.

Englishness: Politics and Letters 1880-1920 (Croom Helm 1986), co-edited with Philip Dodd, was first in a wave of studies on English national identity, and was published in a second edition by Bloomsbury in 2014.

Colls's Identity of England was published by Oxford University Press in 2002. It was Gordon Burn's Book of the Year in The Observer and Paul Laity's in BBC History Magazine. Bernard Crick called it masterly and profound (The Political Quarterly).

Colls's' George Orwell: English Rebel was published by Oxford University Press in 2013. D J Taylor in The Guardian wrote that this was a "prime ornament of Orwell Studies". A N Wilson in The Spectator said it was "the most sensible and systematic interpretation of Orwell I have ever read". Simon Heffer in The Daily Telegraph said that "If there is a better book on George Orwell I have yet to discover it". David Aaronovitch in New Statesman called Colls "a lovely writer, fearless in a way that academics too often are not". David Evans in The Independent said that "Colls writes like an offbeat mixture of Isaiah Berlin and Clive James".

This Sporting Life: Sport and Liberty in England 1760-1960 (OUP 2020) completed what to some reviewers was beginning to look like an Englishness trilogy. It won the Aberdare Prize as, in the words of the judges, "a compelling, evocative and unique explication of what sport has meant to the English". It was one of Dominic Sandbrook's Best History Books of the Year in The Sunday Times and Melvyn Bragg's Book of the Year in New Statesman. Alex Massie in The Spectator thought it was "much more than a history of sport; it is really an alternative history of England".

His next book, George Orwell. Life and Legacy, will be published by Oxford University Press in January 2026.

== Journalism ==
He writes regularly for New Statesman and The Literary Review.

He has written a hefty piece for Transactions of the Royal Historical Society on the craft of writing history (forthcoming).

He has written and broadcast for television and radio, including The South Bank Show (on Lee Hall), Who Do You Think You Are? (on Alan Carr), Analysis (on the English Gentleman), The Verb (on intellectuals), In Our Time (on Animal Farm), From Our Own Correspondent (on France and the USA), Ramblings (with Clare Balding in the steps of the Jarrow Marchers), The Matter of the North (with Melvyn Bragg), Start the Week (on Orwell), Newsnight (on Brexit), A House Through Time (with David Olusuga), British Council (Durham Miners’ Gala), GNR Films (Great North Run), Unherd (on Levelling Up), The Rest is History (on Orwell, and 'The Fight of the Century'), and Radio Free Europe (on Orwell).

He has contributed to German, French, Spanish, US and Italian TV, newspapers and radio on subjects ranging from English regionalism and Scottish independence to Brexit and Leicester City's crowning as English Champions in 2016.
