= Greena =

Island in United Kingdom

Coordinates: 60°13′N 1°19′W

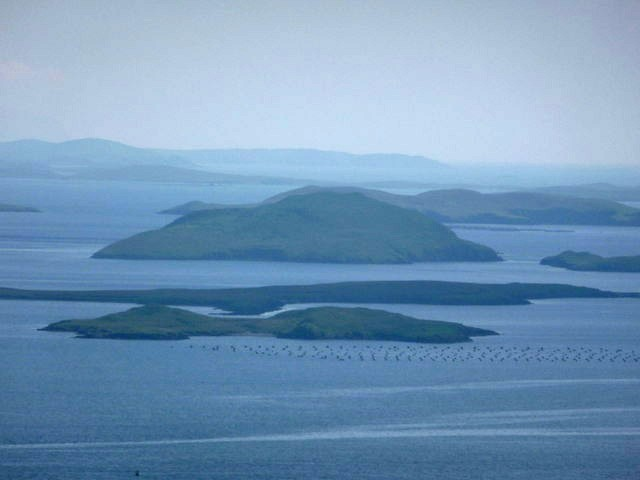
Greena in the foreground, with the islands of Flotta and Hoy behind it

Greena is a small island off the west coast of Mainland, Shetland. It is 10m at its highest point, and is north of Flotta, Shetland. It is in Weisdale Voe.
