= Weisdale Mill =

Coordinates: 60.2601°N 1.2881°W

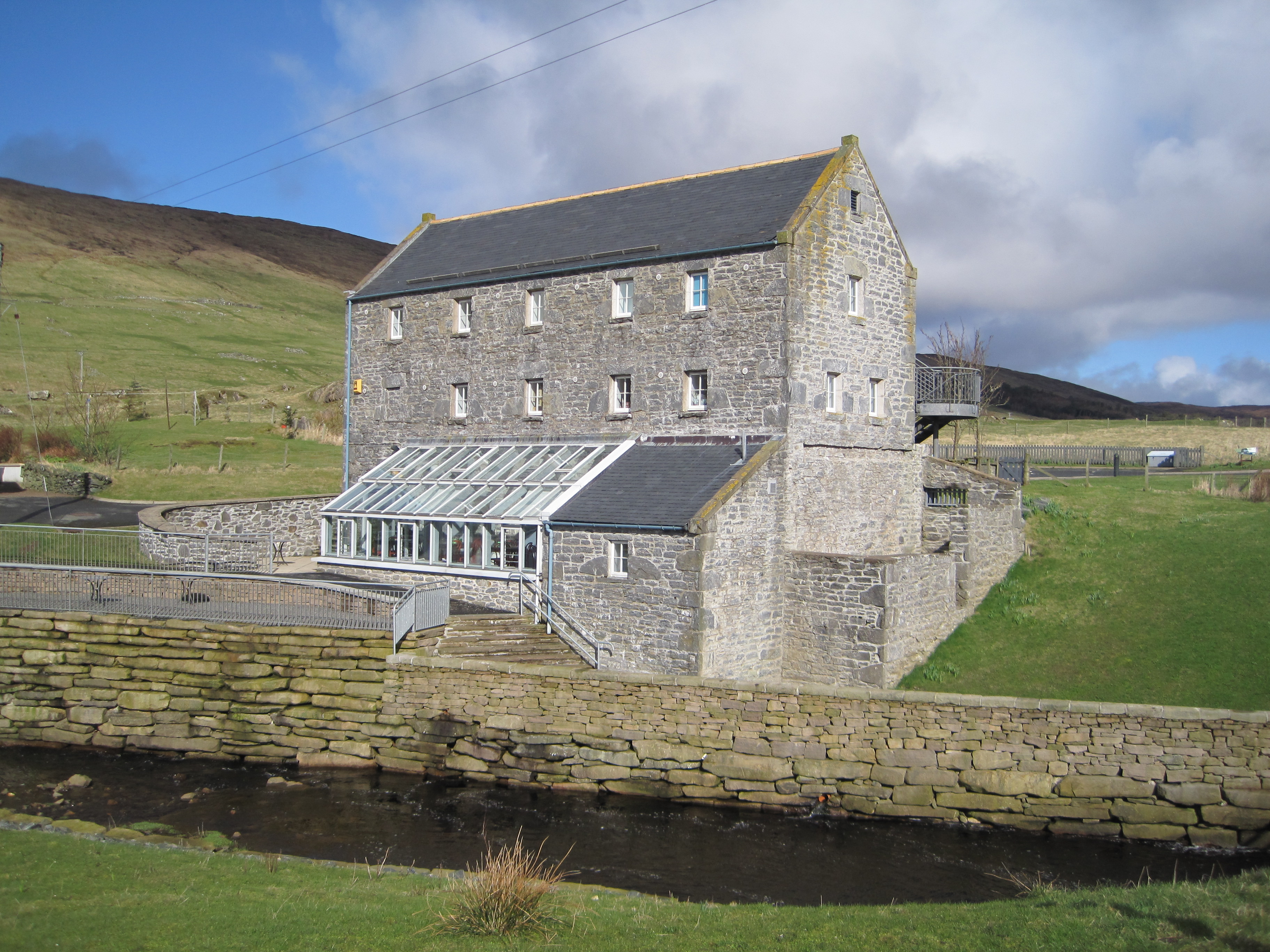
Weisdale Mill

Weisdale Mill is a watermill in the village of Weisdale, Shetland, Scotland. It is located near the head of Weisdale Voe on the west of the island, a twenty-minute drive from the main town of Lerwick.

== History ==
Weisdale Mill was built in 1855 and was Shetland's largest corn mill. It is marked on c.1900 Ordnance Survey maps as Mill of Kergord.

The Weisdale Mill was a busy working mill for many years until the early 1930s. Crofters and farmers came from some considerable distance to get their oats and corn ground into meal and flour. With very little in the way of transport people walked long distances with their crops which then had to be left at the mill and collected at a later date. Some crofters came up the Weidale Voe by boat as far as they could and then walked the short distance to the mill.

In 1936 it was bought by a local farmer (Tony Anderson) and was converted into a slaughter house and butcher shop. The slaughter house was in the basement (where the cafe is now). The ground floor was used for the butcher shop. The top floor was used for storage and was often used to salt sheepskins before they were sold. The butcher shop and slaughter house were very busy particularly during the war years when large numbers of men from the forces were stationed at Scatsta. Anderson also ran a large walk-in butcher van which visited many areas of Shetland daily selling beef and lamb.

During the war the mill was reputedly hit by enemy fire and some bullets came in the back door which was open at the time. No one was hurt.

In 1982 the building ceased to function as a butcher shop and slaughter house. It stood empty for some time but after extensive renovations, completed in 1994, the site is now managed by Shetland Arts and contains the Bonhoga Gallery, (an art gallery whose name means "my spiritual home") the Mill Cafe and a gift shop.
