= Philip Dodd (broadcaster) =

Philip Dodd (born 1949) is an English broadcaster, entrepreneur, curator, writer and editor. He is chairman of the creative industries company Made in China.

== Early career ==
Until 1986, Philip Dodd was a full-time university academic. He was a lecturer in English Language and Literature, University of Leicester, 1976–1989, where he established a reputation in nonfiction studies and rhetoric, having founded (with the late J.C. Hilson) in 1977 the journal Prose Studies, the first journal exclusively devoted to the study of the aesthetics of nonfiction. It is still published, in the United States. He edited a number of related books on autobiography, travel writing and on the art critic Walter Pater.

During the early 1980s, he began work on notions of national identity, precipitated by the onset of the Falklands War and in 1986 with Robert Colls co-edited the volume of essays Englishness: Politics and Culture, 1880–1920, the first modern study of the formation of modern English identity. It was republished by Bloomsbury Press in 2014. The book brought him to the attention of both Melvyn Bragg at London Weekend Television and Alan Yentob, then Head of the Music and Arts department at BBC television. Dodd joined the Music and Arts Department as Yentob's consultant, working on series on culture, writing scripts, helping to found The Late Show, and working on the major six-part art series Relative Values: Art and Value. He also co-wrote (with Louisa Buck) the book of the series, which is still a set text on foundation art courses. In 1989, he left academic life and joined the New Statesman and Society, as deputy editor, while remaining consultant to the BBC, working on series on subjects ranging from political reform to contemporary art. From 1991 to 1998, he worked as consultant with Jane Root, co-owner of Wall to Wall TV, on a wide variety of television series.

== Sight & Sound ==
In 1990, he left the New Statesman and Society and accepted a post as editor of the quarterly Sight & Sound, which was merged with the Monthly Film Bulletin both published by the British Film Institute. The new magazine was relaunched in 1991 as a monthly newsstand magazine, winning Dodd an award as PPA smaller publisher of the year. Writers who wrote for the magazine whose global circulation rose to 26,000 included J. Hoberman, Paul Gilroy, Peter Wollen, Amy Taubin, Peter Biskind, Jeanette Winterson, Ian Christie, Ginette Vincendeau, Michael Tolkin, Quentin Tarantino. A volume of essays selected from the magazine was published as Women and Film (1993), co-edited by Dodd and Pam Cook. In 1996 he was one of the two curators of Spellbound: Art and Film at the Hayward Gallery, London where the artists included Eduardo Paolozzi, Ridley Scott, Douglas Gordon, Steve McQuinn, Paula Rego and Peter Greenaway. Dodd was the Executive Producer of Damien Hirst's film in the exhibition, Hanging Around.

== Directorship of ICA ==
In 1997, he accepted the post of Director of the Institute of Contemporary Arts in London, at a turbulent point at its history. The ICA had a deficit of nearly £1 million and poor attendance figures. He restructured the organisation and tried to return it to its original role as an arts lab of interdisciplinary work, something recognised by the novelist J. G. Ballard, who said that Dodd had transformed the ICA into a "post 2000 ideas lab". Dodd introduced many innovations, including a writer-in-residence programme, which included Zadie Smith, a scientist-in-residence programme (the first time in Britain that a major arts organisation had appointed a scientist as creator), the Beck's Futures prize and the Cultural Entrepreneurs Club, a networking agency that supported 500 of London's young creative businesses. and a PhD programme. In 1998, he took the ICA to China, to Shanghai and Beijing – the first British contemporary arts institution to stage events there – and in 1999, hosted "Beijing London: Revolutionary Capitals", a series of events that showcased new Chinese creativity for the first time in Britain. Artists included Wang Jianwei and Zhang Dali, Xing Xing and Zhang Yuan. With events such as the Chinese season as well as a one devoted to contemporary India, Dodd moved the ICA from a white world into a global one. Artists who exhibited there under Dodd's directorship ranged from Yoko Ono to Philippe Parreno, from Urs Fischer to Steve McQueen who had his first one-person show at the ICA. Dodd was also the Executive Producer of the film distributed by the ICA, entitled Edward Said: the last interview. Dodd moved the ICA beyond the building and persuaded the Pet Shop Boys and the actor Simon McBurney to take over Trafalgar Square. The Boys wrote a new score for Battleship Potemkin which was played live to a screening of the film and McBurney wrote and performed a prologue from the top of St Martin's in the Field. This had an audience of 35000 people. Annual attendance at the ICA increased from 250,000 in 1997 to 750,000 in 2004 and the balance was back in the black. His tenure at the ICA was not without controversy. The then junior Minister for Culture, Kim Howells, described Dodd as a "sneering guardian of the emperor's new clothes". and chairman Ivan Massow left in 2002 following Massow's criticism of the art the ICA supported.

== Made in China ==
In 2004, he left the ICA to found the agency Made in China (www.madeinchinauk.com), develop major projects between China and the UK, some cultural, some educational and some business-oriented. He set up the agency in a belief, stated in an interview in the Financial Times, that the future "belongs to a constellation of India and China". Made in China was the senior consultant (2007/8) on Shanghai eArts, the first annual digital arts festival in China., and was one of the founders of the UK-wide festival "China Now" in 2008. In the early days of Made in China, Dodd was also strategist to Art HK, the largest artfair in Asia, and was advisor to the Chaoyang District government of Beijing and creative consultant to the UK Pavilion at the 2010 World Expo in Shanghai. In 2011, Enrica Costamagna joined the company as co-director and in 2014 they staged the first retrospective of a Western abstract artist in China: Sean Scully's exhibition 'Follow the Heart: the Art of Sean Scully, 1964-2014'. This exhibition was staged at the Himalayas Museum in Shanghai and at CAFAM in Beijing. Dodd and Costamagna have continued to stage major exhibitions in museums across China, as well as staging the work of major Chinese artists in the West. A retrospective of Hsiao Chin, the Shanghai artist who worked in Italy with Fontana and others, will be staged at the Mark Rothko Art Centre, Daugavpils, Latvia in June 2020. In 2014 Dodd was named by Artlyst one of the most important artworld figures in the alternative Art Power List <https://www.artlyst.com/features/artlyst-power-100-2014-alternative-art-power-list-revealed/> and the following year was named by China Business News (《第一财经日报》) 'One of the Top Intellectuals in the World'(31/12/2015). Dodd and Costamagna also founded the Global Private Museum Network, which brought together private museum owners from all over the world. These ranged from the Long Museum in Shanghai to the Rubell Family Collection in Miami, from OHD in Indonesia to Fondazione Sandretto Re Rebaudengo in Italy. Over the last five or six years, Dodd and Costamagna have begun working with property developers in China which are trying to develop cultural quarters. Working for China Merchant Group they brokered the deal that has led London's V&A Museum to open in Shenzhen, Southern China. In 2019 Made in China was recognised by the Hurun Report for its 'Outstanding Contribution to the UK-China Relationship'.

== Other appointments ==
Dodd worked with Demos under the leadership of Geoff Mulgan and the pamphlet that he produced, The Battle Over Britain!, helped to shape the New Labour government's Cool Britannia rebranding of the UK. He is visiting professor, University of the Arts London and a Fellow of the Royal Society of Arts.

He has held various visiting academic professorships, at South Bank University and at King's College London and has developed post-graduate education around the needs of the cultural economy, founding the MA programme in Creative Industries at King's College. He is a Sony award-winning broadcaster and a regular presenter of the BBC Radio 3 arts and ideas programme Free Thinking (formerly Night Waves).

== Selected bibliography ==
- Englishness: Politics and Culture, 1880–1920 (1986)
- Modern Selves: Essays on Modern British and American Autobiography (1986, editor)
