= Garrison Theatre =

Theatre and cinema in Lerwick, Scotland

Coordinates: 60°9′20″N 1°8′45″W

The Garrison Theatre is a 280-capacity venue in Lerwick, Shetland, Scotland, with a sprung proscenium stage with fixed raked seating. The auditorium has 19 rows, named A to S, with 8, 12, 13, 15, or 16 seats in each row.

The venue hosts dance, drama, stand-up comedy, pantomime and music productions. Award-winning amateur dramatic group the Isleburgh Drama Group regularly perform plays at the theatre. It used to host regular film screenings before the purpose-built cinema Mareel opened in 2012.

It was opened in 1903 and used as a drill hall and gymnasium during the First World War. It was also the headquarters of the 7th Volunteer Battalion Gordon Highlanders. The building was converted to a theatre by ENSA in 1942 to be used as a venue to entertain troops during the Second World War. During the 1950s and 1960s it was owned by the Zetland County Council, who decided to repair and refurbish the theatre in 1989, and was programmed by Islesburgh Drama Group and an Entertainments Committee. Ownership was then transferred to the Islesburgh Trust before coming under Shetland Arts management in April 2007. In 2017, the Friends of the Garrison committee was established to protect the theatre's place in the community

Notable acts who have performed at the Garrison Theatre include George Formby and Gracie Fields who both visited Shetland in 1943, Elvis Costello in 1988, Billy Connolly in 1994, and Dylan Moran in 2008.

== Technical specifications ==
The stage width is 23 feet and 5 inches, and the depth is 18 feet and 2 inches. There are four lighting bars above the stage and one (plus the sidebars) in the auditorium.

The box office is at the entrance. Backstage are two large dressing rooms, a kitchen, and showers, as well as the prop room and workshop.
