= Shetland Arts =

Scottish charitable organization

Shetland Arts Development Agency or Shetland Arts for short, is a Scottish charity formed in 2006 (to replace the Shetland Arts Trust) with a remit to "encourage and assist in promoting and advancing the creation, practice and presentation and study of all forms of art - visual, performing and creative."

The organisation, based in Mareel, manage the Weisdale Mill (an art gallery, museum and cafe), the Garrison Theatre and the Mareel cinema, music and education venue.

Music is an important aspect of their work and the "Fiddle Frenzy" traditional music summer school and cultural event is now in its fifth year, the 2008 event building on earlier successes. Shetland Arts intend to produce a comprehensive database of Shetland music.

Shetland Arts' annual programme of events also includes the Peerie Willie Guitar Festival, the ScreenPlay Film Festival (curated by Mark Kermode and Linda Ruth Williams) and the WordPlay Literature Festival.

Shetland Arts' OSCR Charity Number is SC037082
