= Shetland College =

Shetland College UHI
- Type: College
- Established: 1970
- Affiliations: University of the Highlands and Islands,
- Location: Lerwick, Shetland, Scotland
- Website: www.shetland.uhi.ac.uk

Shetland College is a further and higher education college in Lerwick, Shetland, Scotland. It is part of the University of the Highlands and Islands.

The main campus is located at Gremista, on the outskirts of Lerwick. There are also dedicated premises in Lerwick for teaching Hospitality, at Anderson High School; and Health and Care at North Ness Business Park. Outside Lerwick there are Teaching Centres based in more remote parts of Shetland from which daily travel to Lerwick would not be practicable. These are located at Unst, Whalsay, North Mainland, West Mainland and Ness, in the south mainland.

The college also uses video conferencing to deliver some course material.

The college offers subsidised day-care facilities to students via a nursery near Anderson High School in Lerwick.

A review of performance in 2014 by Education Scotland rated the college as effective and highlighted many positive findings.
