= Glymdrápa =

Fragmentary 9th-century skaldic poem

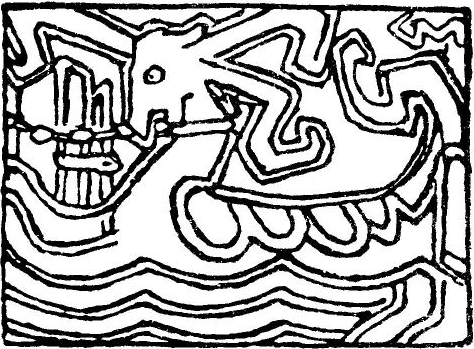
Gerhard Munthe: Illustration for Glymdråpa in Harald Hårfagres Saga (1899)

Glymdrápa ("Drápa of din") is a skaldic poem composed by Þorbjörn Hornklofi, the court poet of King Harald I of Norway (Haraldr hárfagri). Composed toward the end of the 9th century, the poem recounts several battles waged by King Harald, mostly as he was uniting Norway.

Composed in dróttkvætt, only seven stanzas and two half-stanzas are preserved, chiefly in the Heimskringla (Haralds saga hárfagra). Glymdrápa is the oldest praise poem to a king (konungsdrápa) which has come down to us. The poem has few clear geographical or historical points of reference, and the two sagas which quote it, Heimskringla and Fagrskinna interpret it differently.

In Heimskringla, the poem is said to recount Harald's fight against the people of Orkdal at Oppdal forest (Uppdalsskógr), first against Huntiof, King of Nordmøre (Húnþjófr), his son Solve Klove (Sölvi) and his father-in-law King Nokkve (Nökkvi), king of Romsdal; second against Sölvi and his allies Arnviðr, king of Sunnmøre, and Auðbjörn, who ruled over the Fjords in the districts of Nordfjord and Sunnfjord. Lastly Harald's battles in Gotland and finally his expedition westwards to fight Vikings, which led him to the Isle of Man.

According to Fagrskinna's account, part of the poem relates events of the Battle of Hafrsfjord, the decisive battle in King Harald's unification of Norway.

== See also ==
- First battle of Solskjel
- Second battle of Solskjel

== Primary Sources ==
- Heimskringla: History of the Kings of Norway, translated Lee M. Hollander.(Austin: University of Texas Press, 1992) ISBN 0-292-73061-6
- Fagrskinna: A Catalogue of the Kings of Norway, translated by Alison Finlay (Leiden: Brill Academic Publishers, 2004) ISBN 90-04-13172-8

== Other sources ==
- Boyer, Régis (1990) La Poésie scaldique. Paris: Éd. du Porte-glaive. ISBN 2-906468-13-4.
- Faulkes, Anthony (ed.) (1998) Snorri Sturluson: Edda. Skáldskaparmál. Vol. 2, Glossary and Index of Names. London: Viking Society for Northern Research. ISBN 0-903521-38-5

== Related Reading ==
- Krag, Claus (2000) Norges historie fram til 1319 (Universitetsforlaget) ISBN 9788200129387 (In Norwegian)
