= Guttorm Haraldsson =

First son of King Harald Fairhair of Norway

- King of Ranrike
- Reign: c) 890 - c) 910
- Predecessor: Erik Eymundsson
- Born: c) 870
- Died: c) 900
- Dynasty: Fairhair dynasty (later tradition) Yngling (early tradition)
- Father: Harald Fairhair
- Mother: Åsa Håkonsdotter
- Religion: Norse Paganism

Guttorm Haraldsson was the first son of King Harald Fairhair of Norway and Åsa, daughter of Håkon Grjotgardsson, who was the first Earl of Lade.

Harald had wrested Rånrike in Viken from the Swedish King Erik Eymundsson. Harald made Guttorm king over Rånrike and gave him the responsibility of defending southeast Norway from Sweden.

Guttorm fell in a sea battle against the sea-king Solve Huntiofsson (Solve Klove), son of Huntiof, King of Nordmøre. Solve Klove had earlier escaped capture at the First battle of Solskjel (ca. 870) in which both King Huntiof and King Nokkve of Romsdal had been slain.

== Other sources ==
- Sturluson, Snorri. Heimskringla: History of the Kings of Norway, translated Lee M. Hollander. Reprinted University of Texas Press, Austin, 1992. ISBN 0-292-73061-6

== Related Reading ==
- Finlay, Alison (editor and translator) Fagrskinna, a Catalogue of the Kings of Norway (Brill Academic. 2004) ISBN 90-04-13172-8
- Hermannsson, Halldór (2009) Bibliography of the sagas of the kings of Norway (BiblioBazaar) ISBN 978-1113624611
- Jones, Gwyn (1984) A History of the Vikings (Oxford University Press. 2nd ed) ISBN 0-19-285139-X.
