= Jórunn skáldmær =

Jórunn skáldmær ("poet-maiden") was a Norwegian skald active in the first half of the 10th century. Only two stanzas and three half-stanzas of her Sendibítr ("Biting message") were preserved, mostly in Snorri Sturluson's works, such as Saga of Harald Fairhair and Skáldskaparmál. The Sendibítr, which deals with a conflict between Harald Fairhair and his son Halfdan the Black, is the longest recorded skaldic poem composed by a woman.

== See also ==
- Hildr Hrólfsdóttir
- Gunnhildr konungamóðir
- Steinunn Refsdóttir
