= Battle of Hakadal =

Coordinates: 60°7′9.7″N 10°49′29.88″E

- Part of the unification of Norway
Date	c. 860
Location	Hakadal, Nittedal
Result	Vestfold victory

Belligerents
Kingdom of Vestfold	Kingdom of Alfheimr

Commanders and leaders
Guttorm Sigurdsson Dagling	Hake Gandalfsson †

The battle at Hakadal was the first battle in Snorre Sturlasson's narration of Harald Fairhair's unification of Norway.

Heimskringla tells of how when king Halfdan the Black of Vestfold died his son Harald was still only a child of ten. The kings of the surrounding countries quickly attempted to take advantage of the perceived weakness of the child king. While several kings from Oppland were gathering forces in the north, king Gandalf Alfgeirsson of Alfheimr was the first to strike. He split his army in two, one force led by his son Hake was to advance on land, while the other, led by Gandalv, was to cross the sea and attack the Vestfold army from the rear.

On hearing of the enemy army approaching king Harald's regent, his uncle Guttorm, quickly raised an army and marched towards the army advancing overland. Guttorm destroyed the enemy army, and Hake fell there. The valley where they fought has later taken his name.

After the battle Guttorm turned his forces to face the army of king Gandalv that had landed in Vestfold, further south. Guttorm forced Gandalv to retreat, and destroyed most of his army.
