= Orkdal =

Orkdal may refer to:

== Places ==
- Orkdal Municipality, a former municipality in Trøndelag county, Norway
- Orkdal or Orkdalen, a valley and traditional district in Trøndelag county, Norway
- Orkdal Fjord, a fjord in Trøndelag county, Norway
- Orkdal Church, a church in Orkland Municipality in Trøndelag county, Norway

== Other ==
- Orkdal IL, a sports club based in Orkland Municipality in Trøndelag county, Norway
- Battle of Orkdal, a battle in medieval Norway
- Orkdal prosti, a Church of Norway deanery in Trøndelag county, Norway
- Orkdal District Court, a former district court in the old Sør-Trøndelag county, Norway
