= First battle of Solskjel =

First Battle of Solskjel
- Part of unification of Norway
Date	c. 870
Location	Solskjel, Nordmøre
Result	Vestfold victory

Belligerents
Kingdom of Vestfold	Kingdom of Nordmøre; Kingdom of Romsdal

Commanders and leaders
Harald Fairhair	Huntiof †; Nokvel †

The First Battle of Solskjel (Slaget ved Solskjel) was the first engagement in Harald Fairhair's attempt to subjugate western Norway to his rule.

The two kings of Nordmøre and Romsdal had joined forces to stop the fleet of king Harald, who was sailing south from Trøndelag. Harald was again victorious, and his two opponents Huntiof, King of Nordmøre and his father-in-law, King Nokkve of Romsdal, were both slain in battle. However Solve Klove, the son of King Huntiof escaped.

After the battle Harald laid both countries under his rule, and stayed there for the rest of the summer.

== See also ==
- Second battle of Solskjel
- Glymdrápa

== Primary source ==
- Snorri Sturluson. Heimskringla: History of the Kings of Norway, translated Lee M. Hollander. Reprinted University of Texas Press, Austin, 1992. ISBN 0-292-73061-6

== Other sources ==
- Finlay, Alison (editor and translator) Fagrskinna, a Catalogue of the Kings of Norway (Brill Academic. 2004) ISBN 90-04-13172-8
- Hermannsson, Halldór (2009) Bibliography of the sagas of the kings of Norway (BiblioBazaar) ISBN 978-1113624611
- Jones, Gwyn (1984) A History of the Vikings (Oxford University Press. 2nd ed) ISBN 0-19-285139-X.

== Related reading ==
(In Norwegian)

- Krag, Claus (2000) Norges historie fram til 1319 (Universitetsforlaget) ISBN 978-82-00-12938-7
