= Gryting, King of Orkdal =

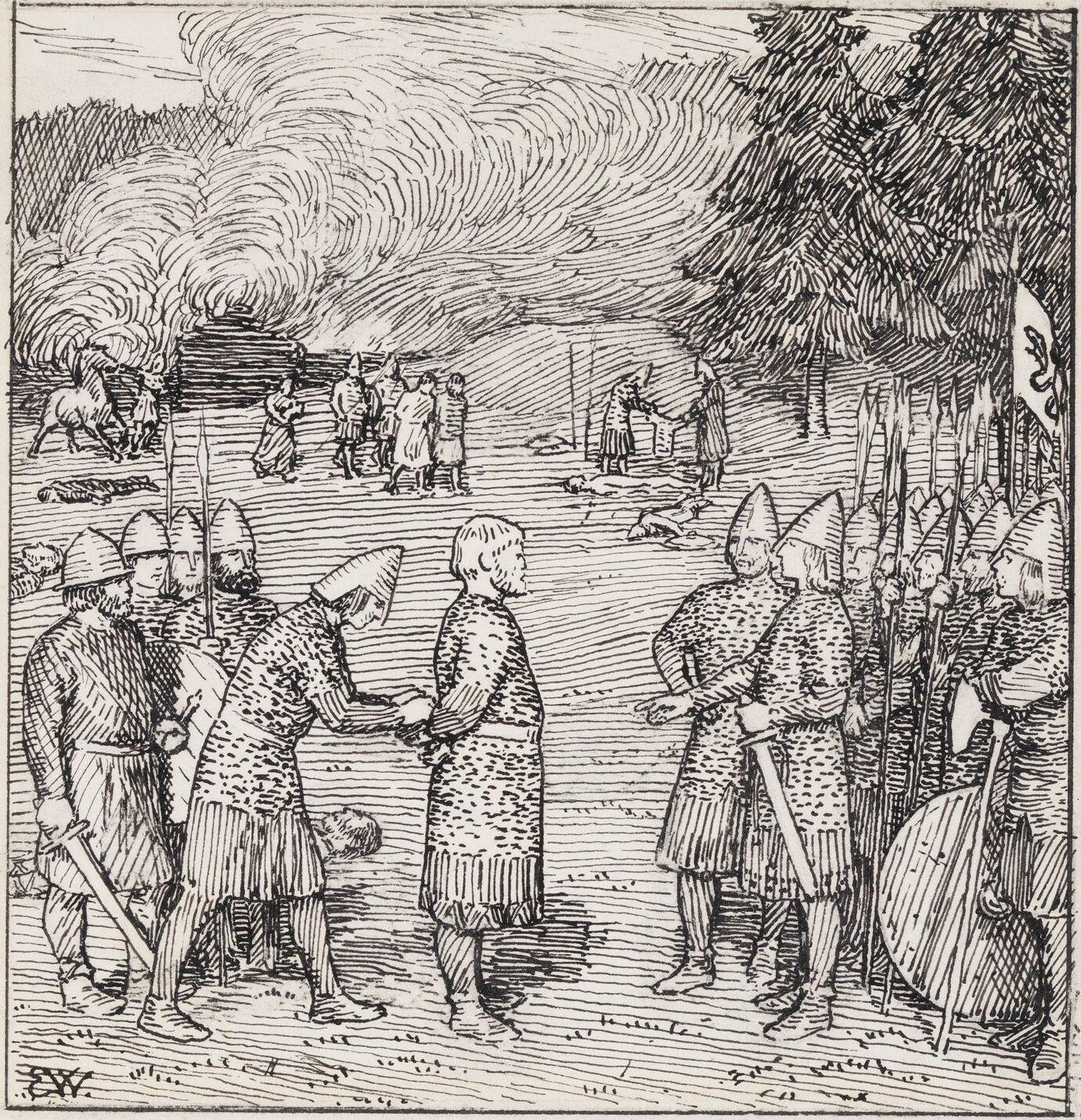
Drawing of the captured King Gryting brought before King Harald

Gryting was, according to the Heimskringla, a king of Orkdal in the period leading up to Harald Fairhair's unification of Norway. He was the first leader in Trøndelag to make a stand against King Harald's ravaging of the country. At the Battle of Orkdal, Gryting's men were defeated, and Gryting taken prisoner. After this, Gryting swore allegiance to King Harald.

Preceded by ?	King of Orkdal ?–ca. 870	Succeeded by Harald Fairhair
