= Battle of Fjaler =

C. 880 battle in Norway

Coordinates: 61°21′46.71″N 5°23′52.87″E

- Part of unification of Norway
Date	c. 880
Location	Fjaler, Sunnfjord
Result	Indecisive

Belligerents
Earldom of Lade	Earldom of Sogn

Commanders and leaders
Håkon Grjotgardsson †	Atle Mjove †

The Battle of Fjaler was an engagement related to Harald Fairhair's unification of Norway. It took place in the area that makes up the present-day Fjaler Municipality.

After having subdued the kingdom of Firda, Harald left for the east, placing Håkon Ladejarl in possession of Firda. Håkon sent a messenger to earl Atle Mjove in Sogn, telling him the king Harald had given the order that Atle should give Sogn to him. Atle answered that he would do no such thing unless told by the king in person. Both earls then gathered an army, and they clashed by a place called Fialar in Sunnfjord. Both earls were killed in the battle.
