= Hákonar saga Hákonarsonar =

Norse saga

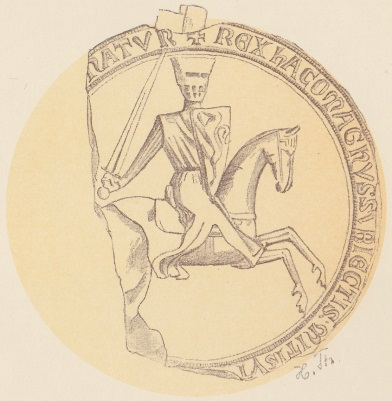
Reverse seal of King Haakon IV Haakonsson of Norway. The seal itself was given to Haakon as a gift from Henry III of England in 1236

Hákonar saga Hákonarsonar ("The Saga of Haakon Haakonarson") or Hákonar saga gamla ("The Saga of Old Haakon") is an Old Norse Kings' Saga, telling the story of the life and reign of King Haakon Haakonarson of Norway.

== Content and style ==
The circumstances of the saga's composition are exceptionally well understood, as they are recorded in some detail in Sturlunga saga (particularly Sturlu þáttr): the saga was written in the 1260s (apparently 1264–65) by the Icelandic historian and chieftain Sturla Þórðarson (nephew of the noted historian Snorri Sturluson). Sturla Þórðarson was at the court of Haakon's son Magnus Lagabøte when Magnus learned of his father's death in Kirkwall in Orkney. Magnus is said to have immediately commissioned Sturla to write his father's saga. This was awkward for Sturla: 'King Hákon had instigated the death of Sturla's uncle, Snorri Sturluson, in 1241. Sturla rightly regarded Hákon as his most dangerous enemy, for he had steadfastly resisted the king's subjugation of Iceland to Norway, which was accomplished in 1262–1264. Skúli Bárðarson (d. 1240), Hákon's most dangerous rival for royal power, was the maternal grandfather of Magnús, who supervised the composition of his father's biography, much as King Sverrir is said to have "sat over" Karl Jónsson as the Icelandic abbot wrote Sverrir's biography'. Sturla makes extensive use of written evidence in this text, in a manner that has been argued to correspond with contemporary European practices.

== Manuscripts and transmission ==
The saga survives in three main redactions, preserved primarily in the manuscripts Eirspennill, Codex Frisianus, and Flateyjarbók. However, there is not yet a satisfactory stemma of the saga, as the relationships between its manuscripts are complex.

According to Kari Ellen Gade's edition of the verse in the saga in the Skaldic Poetry of the Scandinavian Middle Ages edition, the key manuscripts of the saga are:

- Eirspennill, AM 47 fol, 139v-194v (early C14).
- Jöfraskinna, preserved in NRA 55 A (one-leaf fragment).
- Fríssbók, Codex Frisianus, AM 45 fol., 84ra-124rb (early C14).
- Gullinskinna, preserved in AM 325 VIII 5 c 4° (one-leaf fragment).
- AM 42 fol^{x}, copy of G, 82r-177v.
- AM 80 fol^{x} (80^{x}), also a copy of G, by Ásgeir Jónsson (end of C17)
- Skálholtsbók yngsta, AM 81 a fol (Icelandic, c. 1450–75), 64va-120vb.
- Holm perg 8 fol, 32v-81v (32v-68v c. 1340–70; 69r-81v c. 1500), with AM 325 VIII 5 a 4° (three leaves originally belonging to the first section of Holm perg 8 fol.)
- AM 304 4°^{x} (c. 1600-50 and later, copied from Holm perg 8 fol. when it was more complete than it is now).
- AM 325 VIII 5 b 4° (c. 1300–25). Two leaves.
- AM 325 X 4° (c. 1370), 11ra-12vb.
- Flateyjarbók, GKS 1005 fol.
- NRA 55 B (55 B), a one-leaf fragment (c. 1300–25)

== Editions and translations ==
- Hákonar saga Hákonarsonar, Bǫglunga saga, Magnúss saga lagabœtis, ed. by Sverrir Jakobsson, Þorleifur Hauksson, and Tor Ulset, Íslenzk fornrit, 31–32, 2 vols (Reykjavík: Hið íslenzka fornritafélag, 2013) (now the standard edition of the Old Icelandic)
- Poetry from the Kings' Sagas 2, ed. by Kari Ellen Gade, Skaldic Poetry of the Scandinavian Middle Ages, 2 (Turnhout: Brepols, 2009) (verse only)
- Hákonar saga Hákonarsonar, etter Sth. 8 fol., AM 325 VIII 4to og AM 304 4to, ed. by Marina Mundt, Norsk historisk kjeldeskrift-institutt: Norrøne tekster, 2 (Oslo: Norsk historisk kjeldeskrift-institutt i kommisjon hos Forlagsentralen, 1977); supplement: James E. Knirk, Rettelser til Hákonar saga Hákonarsonar etter Sth. 8 hi, AM 325 VIII 4° og AM 304 4°, Norrøne tekster, 2 (Oslo: Norsk historisk kjeldeskrift-institutt, 1982)
- Icelandic Sagas and Other Documents Relating to the Settlements and Descents of the Northmen on the British Isles, ed. by Gudbrand Vigfusson, Rerum Britannicarum medii aevi scriptores, 88, 4 vols (London: H. M. Stationery Office, 1887–94), https://archive.org/details/icelandicsagasot01stur, https://archive.org/details/icelandicsagasot02stur, https://archive.org/details/icelandicsagasot04stur (Old Norse edition volume 2; English translation vol 4b pp. 1–373 by G. W. Dasent)
- Sturla Þórðarson, Håkon Håkonssons saga, trans. by Anne Holtsmark (Oslo: Aschehoug, 1964) (Norwegian translation)
- Norwegische Königsgeschichten, trans. by Felix Niedner, rev. edn, Thule: altnordische Dichtung und Prosa, 17–18, 2 vols (Düsseldorf: Diederichs, 1965) (German translation)
- Sturla Tordsson, Soga om Håkon Håkonsson, trans. by Kr. Audne, 2d edn by Knut Helle, Norrøne bokverk, 22 (Oslo: Norske samlaget, 1963)
- The Norwegian account of Haco's expedition against Scotland, A.D. MCCLXIII at Project Gutenberg, trans. by James Johnstone (Edinburgh: Brown, 1882, repr. from 1782)

== Other sources ==
- Ármann Jakobsson (2015) "Views to a kill. Sturla þórðarson and the murder in the cellar." Saga book of the Viking Society for Northern Research vol. 39, p. 5-20
- Rohrbach, Lena (2017) “Narrative Negotiations of Literacy Practices in Íslendinga saga and Hákonar saga Hákonarsonar“. In: Jón Viðar Sigurðsson/ Sverrir Jakobsson (eds.): Sturla Þórðarson (1214-1284). Life and Legacy. (Northern World). Leiden: Brill, 93–106.
- Ross, Margaret Clunies (2010) The Cambridge Introduction to the Old Norse-Icelandic Saga (Cambridge University Press) ISBN 978-0-521-73520-9
- McTurk, Rory (2005) A Companion to Old Norse-Icelandic Literature and Culture (Wiley-Blackwell) ISBN 978-0-631-23502-6
