= Ragnhild the Mighty =

Wife of Harald Fairhair (870–897)

- Born: 870 AD
- Died: 897 (aged 27)
- Known for: Wife of Harald Fairhair
- Spouse: Harald Fairhair
- Children: Eirik Bloodaxe
- Father: Eirik

Ragnhild the Mighty (Old Norse: Ragnhildr inn Rika Eiríksdóttir, Norwegian: Ragnhild Eiriksdatter) was a wife of Harald Fairhair, according to Icelandic historian Snorri Sturluson.

== About ==
According to Sturluson's Heimskringla saga, Ragnhild was the daughter of the Jutish king, Eirikr. She had a son, Eirik Bloodaxe, by Harald, who left all his previous wives and concubines for her. Snorri cites a stanza from Hrafnsmál to back this claim up, but said stanza only mentions Harald rejected several women for "a Danish woman". The couple were only married for three years before Ragnhild became ill and died. She was born in AD 870 and died in AD 897 at age 27.

== Historicity ==
Historian Claus Krag, proponent of a revisionist view that Harald Fairhair was a powerful ruler of Vestlandet, rather than the king of all Norway, has questioned the story of Ragnhild the Mighty. He notes that no other sources mention her supposed father, King Eirik of Jutland, and suggests that at least this part of the narrative is an invention by Sturluson (or his source) to legitimize Eirik Bloodaxe's name and royal claim. Even in Heimskringla Sturluson contradicts himself by saying that during the time Harald ruled Norway, Gorm the Old ruled all of Denmark, which would have left little room for a King Eirik. On the other hand, Gorm is considered to have ruled only parts of Denmark, and his son Harald Bluetooth is said to have finally united Denmark under his rule.

Though Hrafnsmál, generally considered to be a contemporary work, mentions Ragnhild, this could well refer to the more widely attested mother of Harald Fairhair, also called Ragnhild. Eirik Bloodaxe is widely attested to have had a daughter called Ragnhild. Though it was medieval custom to name a child after one's parent, this custom extended to grandparents as well, so her namesake might also have been Eirik's grandmother.
