= Atli the Slender =

9th-century Norwegian jarl

Atli the Slender (Old Norse: Atli hinn Mjovi) was a ninth-century Norwegian jarl mentioned in several Old Norse sources, including Heimskringla and Egils saga.

Atli was the son of Hundolf, a jarl of Gaular in Fjordane. His sister was Solvor Hundolfsdottir, the wife of King Harald Goldbeard of Sogn. He became friends with King Halfdan the Black of Vestfold and accompanied him on a number of his expeditions. In particular, Atli accompanied Halfdan when, following the death of Halfdan's father in law Harald Goldbeard and Halfdan's son Harald, the Vestfolder king led an expedition to take possession of Sogn as their heir. Halfdan made Atli jarl over all of Sogn.

Atli continued to govern Sogn into the reign of Halfdan's son Harald Fairhair. He is mentioned in Egils saga in connection with the famous skald Olvir Hnufa, the eponymous Egill's great-uncle. At a thing in Gaular, Olvir fell in love with Solveig Atladottir, Atli's daughter. The jarl refused Olvir permission to marry the girl, but he was so smitten that he abandoned his Viking life to be near her. A skald of some talent, he composed a number of love poems for Solveig. For reasons not revealed in the saga, but probably related to his courtship of Solveig, Olvir was attacked and nearly killed in his home by Solveig's brothers shortly after King Harald's conquest of Møre.

Atli's sons, Hallstein, Holmstein and Herstein, were famous Norsemen who sailed with the foster brothers Hjörleifr Hróðmarsson and Ingólfr Arnarson. They fell out, however, over Ingolfur's sister Helga, who married Hjörleifur. In the ensuing blood feud two of Atli's sons were killed and their erstwhile allies fled Norway for Iceland, becoming the first permanent settlers there.

After Harald Fairhair conquered Møre and Fjordane he assigned the governance of the former to Rognvald Eysteinsson and the latter to Håkon Grjotgardsson. Hákon and Atli soon came into conflict over Sogn and fought a battle at Fjalir in Stafaness Bay, in which Håkon was killed. Atli was severely wounded in the battle and taken to a nearby island, where he died.

Eyvindr skáldaspillir wrote a verse about the battle which is preserved in Heimskringla:

Was Hakon, Hogni's daughter's-tree
fey when to fight he went;
and his life lost in combat
Frey's offspring on Fjalir strand.
Blended was with blood the wave,
as friends fell, faithful to him,
and wound-gore warm of warriors,
in Ygg's storm
by Stafaness.
