= Battle of Orkdal =

Coordinates: 63°16′30.13″N 9°49′25.51″E

- Part of unification of Norway
Date	c. 870
Location	Orkdalen
Result	Vestfold victory

Belligerents
Kingdom of Vestfold	Kingdom of Orkdal

Commanders and leaders
Harald Fairhair	Gryting

The Battle of Orkdal was, according to Heimskringla, the first attempt at resistance against Harald Fairhair's conquests in Trøndelag. Heimskringla said Harald was massacring and burning his way through Trøndelag, without any opposition, until he came down to Orkdal. Here, King Gryting gathered a large group of men to make a stand against the invading forces. Harald was victorious and Gryting was taken prisoner while a large part of his army were killed. After this, Gryting and the whole of Orkdal subjected themselves to King Harald.
