= Saga of Harald Fairhair =

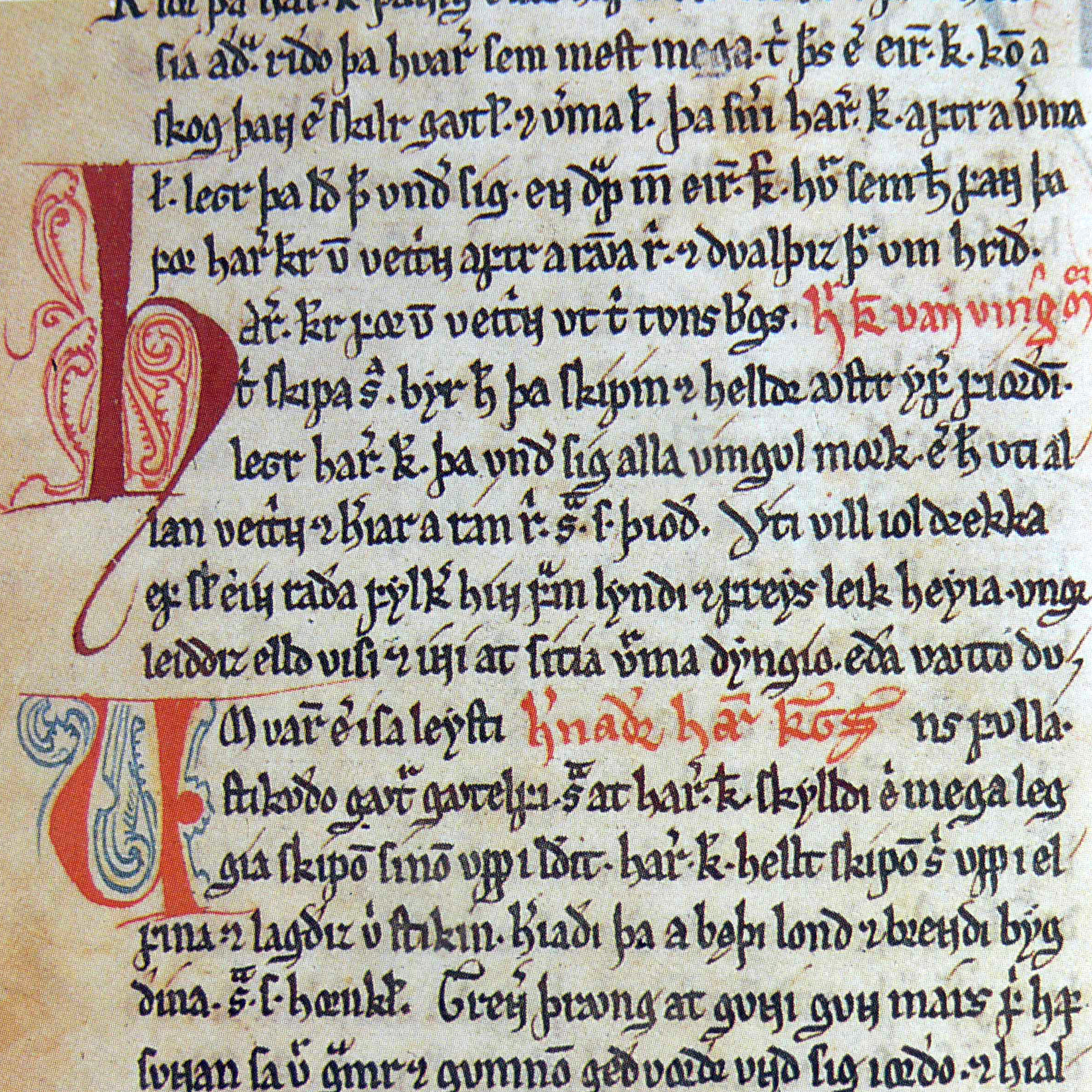
Excerpt from Codex Frisianus from approx. 1330: Introduction to Chapter 15 in Harald Fairhair's saga

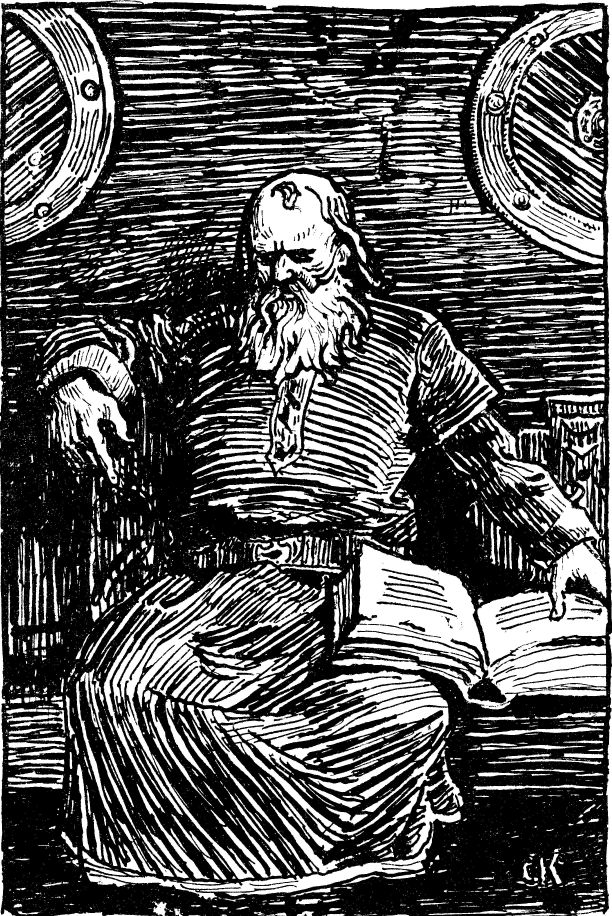
Snorri Sturluson as the artist Christian Krogh imagined him. Illustration to Heimskringla, 1899.

The Saga of Harald Fairhair (Haralds saga hárfagra) is the third of the sagas in Snorri Sturluson's Heimskringla, after Ynglinga saga and the saga of Halfdan the Black. Snorri sagas were written in Iceland in the 1220s. This saga is about the Norwegian king Harald Fairhair.

== Content ==
The saga is divided into 44 chapters.

The saga begins with Harald taking over the kingdom at age 10 after the death of his father Halvdan. Halvdan probably had his royal seat at Ringerike or Hadeland, and the kingdom included inner Eastern parts of Norway. After Halvdan's death several local kings tried to take over his empire but Harald defended it with the help of his uncle Guttorm. The saga tells us about Harald's proposal to the princess Gyda Eiriksdatter who refused to marry someone who was king of a small kingdom. She is thereby given credit for having spurred Harald to the adventures recounted in this collection of works.

Snorri goes on about Harald's mission to Trøndelag, his victories there, and his further journey to Möre. Snorri cites from poet en Þorbjörn Hornklofi's poem Glymdråpa and a little later in the saga from scald Eyvindr skáldaspillir.

Chapter 13 tells that Harald was back in Viken having conquered the whole west country, adding it to his kingship Vingulmark. Chapters 16 and 17 tell about Harald's matches in Götaland (Sweden); the saga of Chapter 18 recounts the Battle of Hafrsfjord that gave Harald a definitive position as King of all Norway. Þorbjörn Hornklofi made this poem about the battle:

Heyrðir í Hafrsfirði,
hvé hizug barðisk
konungr enn kynstóri
við Kjǫtva enn auðlagða;
knerrir kómu austan,
kaps of lystir,
með ginǫndum hǫfðum
ok grǫfnum tinglum.

After the victory at Hafrsfjord saga, Harald took the maiden Gyda, married her and had 5 children. The saga is otherwise generous with accounts of Harald's wives and children. Snorri mentions Åsa, one Svanhild, one Åshild, and finally Ragnhild the Mighty, a daughter of King Eirik of Jutland. It is there stated that he sent his 9 wives away to marry Ragnhild. Þorbjörn Hornklofi was quoted on this:

Hafnaði Holmrýgjum
ok Hǫrða meyjum
hverri enni heinversku
ok Hǫlga ættar
konungr enn kynstóri,
es tók konu danska.

Snorri tells us that Harald had his hair cut off by Ragnvald, Earl of Moer after 10 years, and he was named Hårfagre (Finehair). Previously he was nicknamed Luva (the scruffy), as mentioned in the Hornkløves poem about the Battle of Hafrsfjord.

Woven into the saga is the story of Snæfrithr Svásadottir, a sami girl who had enchanted the King. According to the story, Harald and Snæfrithr had 4 sons among whom was Halfdan Hålegg. They are discussed in the Orkneyinga saga as controversial and puzzling individuals.

Chapter 32 relates Harald's mission to Orkney. Moreover, Snorri tells us about Harald's relationship with the King Æthelstan and Harald's son Håkon, later Haakon the Good. Æthelstan brought up Håkon, and Snorri portrays it as if Harald tricked Æthelstan to do so.

In the final chapters, Snorri tells that Harald put forth his son Eirik Bloodaxe to rule the country. King Eric has no self-named saga behind him, but he is briefly discussed in this saga and in the subsequent saga about his half brother, Haakon the Good.

== Literary style ==
While Heimskringla, the Harald Fairhair saga, is still recognized as some of the best in Old Norse literature from this period as "due primarily to Snorri uniting historical criticism and thinking with ingenious storytelling. He composes meticulously; prepares and creates excitement, regression and expectation until the decision falls in an intense, dramatic scene. " The other sources, Ágrip af Nóregskonungasögum and Fagrskinna, are more concise and sober in style, while Snorri elaborates and enlivens the action and people. Snorri shows an ability to find relationships, motives and reasons. He gives passion to speeches and conversations.

== Written records ==
The only preserved medieval written source of the Snorri sagas is Codex Frisianus from about 1330. The other records were lost in a library fire in Copenhagen in 1728.

== Literature ==
- Beyer, Harald: Norsk litteraturhistorie ("Norwegian history of literature"). Oslo 1952
- Snorri Sturlusson, Harald Hårfargres saga. In: Norges Kongesagaer ("Norwegian king sagas"). Translated by Astrid Salvesen, Gyldeldal, Oslo 1979
