= Halfdan Haraldsson the Black =

Norwegian king

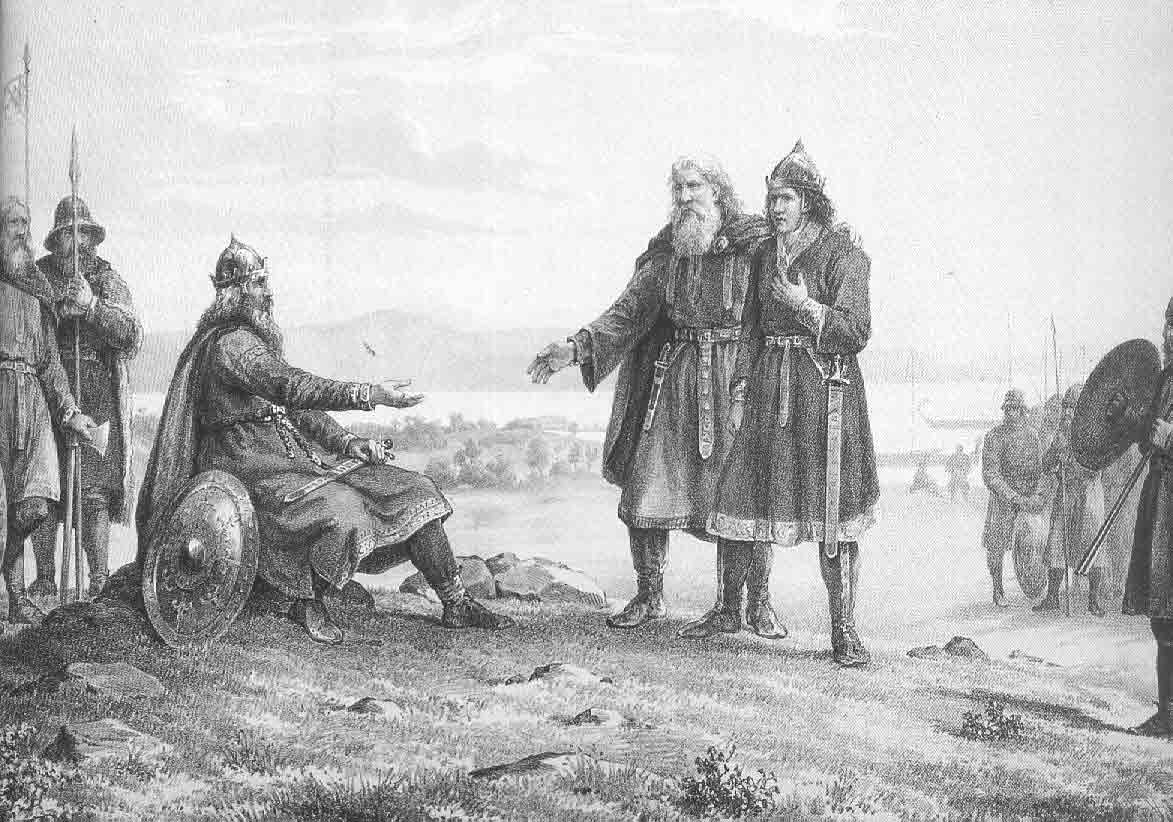
The skald Gudtorm Sindre reconciling king Harald Fairhair with his son Halfdan.

Halfdan Haraldsson or Halfdan the Black was a son of Harald I of Norway by his first wife, Åsa, the daughter of Jarl Håkon Grjotgardsson of Lade. He was made sub-king of the Trondelag by his father, along with his brother Halfdan the White. According to Heimskringla, Halfdan the Black was poisoned, possibly at the behest of his sister in law Gunnhild, Mother of Kings.
