= Codex Frisianus =

Manuscript of the early 14th century

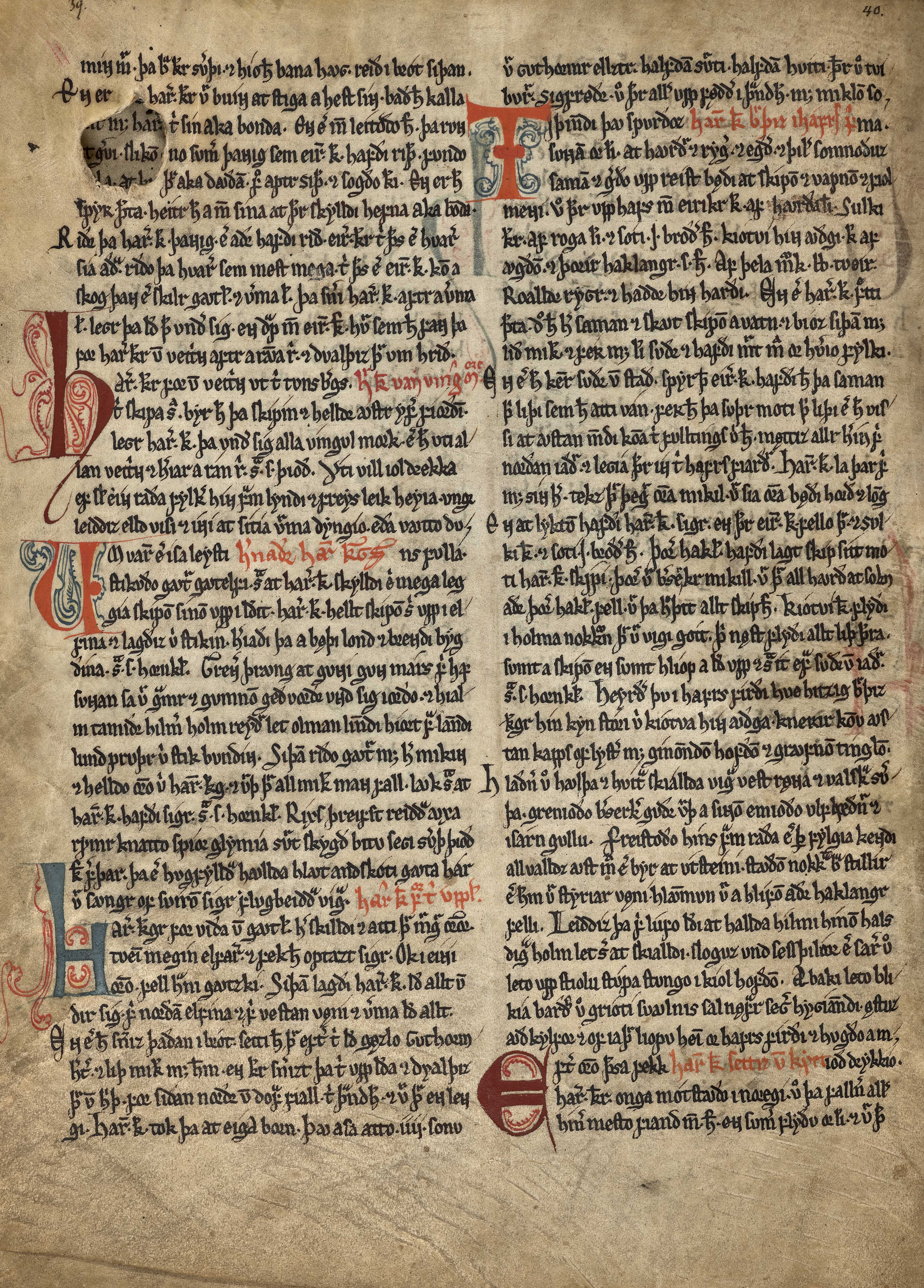
Part of Haralds saga hárfagra in the Codex Frisianus

Codex Frisianus or Fríssbók (shelfmark AM 45 fol. in the Arnamagnæanske samling) is a manuscript of the early fourteenth century (c. 1300–1325). Among its 124 folios, it contains Heimskringla (without the Saga of Saint Olaf) and Hákonar saga Hákonarsonar.

== Origins and history ==
The manuscript might have been written in Iceland and soon moved into Norway or have been composed in Norway. It was found in Bergen in 1550 and brought to Denmark before 1600, when it was acquired by the collector Otto Friis, from whom it takes its name. It then came into the possession of Jens Rosenkrantz before being bought in 1695 by Árni Magnússon. The latter gave it at his death (1730) to the University of Copenhagen.

== Facsimiles and transcriptions ==
- Codex Frisianus: (Sagas of the kings of Norway): MS. no. 45 fol. in the Arnamagnæan Collection in the University Library of Copenhagen, ed. by Halldór Hermannsson, Corpus codicum Islandicorum medii aevi, 4 (Copenhagen: Levin & Munksgaard, 1932) (facsimile)
- Codex Frisianus: en samling af norske kongesagaer: udgiven efter offentlig foranstaltning, ed. by C. R. Unger (Christiania: Malling, 1871)
- Codex Membranaceus Arnamagnæanus nr. 45 in folio ex nomine quondam possessoris Ottonis Frisii dictus Codex Frisianus, ed. by P. Petersen (Christiania, 1864)
