= Håkon Grjotgardsson =

First Earl of Lade

Håkon Grjotgardsson (Old Norse: Hákon Grjótgarðsson) was the first Earl of Lade and an ally of Harald Fairhair, King of Norway.

== Biography ==
Nicknamed Håkon the Rich (Hákon jarl hinn riki) and Håkon the old (Hákon jarl hinn gamli), he was the son and heir of Grjotgard Herlaugsson Lade. He succeeded his father as ruler of the petty kingdom of Trøndelag. His daughter Åsa, married Harald Fairhair and was the mother of Guttorm Haraldsson and Halfdan Haraldsson. Håkon was also the father of Sigurd Håkonsson, who was the father of Haakon Sigurdsson.

Håkon had his residence at Ørlandet at the mouth of the Trondheimsfjord. The exact extent of his control over the area is not confirmed. Håkon sought to extend his kingdom southwards. Harald Fairhair advanced across the mountains of Eastern Norway to subjugate Trøndelag. After some fighting, Håkon and Harald entered a union of joint forces. Håkon was made earl of Sunnfjord and Nordfjord. He took up residence in the area of Lade gaard in Trondheim.

After Harald Fairhair conquered Møre and Fjordane, he assigned the governance of the former to Rognvald Eysteinsson and the latter to Håkon. Atle Mjove continued to govern Sogn. Hákon and Atle Mjove soon came into conflict over Sogn and fought the Battle of Fjaler, in which Hakon was killed. Atle Mjove was severely wounded in the battle and taken to Atløy where he also died.

== Primary Source ==
The primary source of information regarding Håkon Grjotgardsson comes from Harald Haarfagres saga composed by Snorre Sturlasson.

== Other sources ==
- Forte, Angelo; Oram, Richard; Pedersen, Frederik (2005) Viking Empires (Cambridge University Press) ISBN 0-521-82992-5
- Stenersen, Øyvind; Libæk, Ivar (2003) The History of Norway (Lysaker: Forlaget Historie og Kultur) ISBN 8280710418
- Thuesen, Nils Petter (2011) Norges historie (Oslo: Forlaget Historie og Kultur) ISBN 978-8292870518

== Related reading ==
- Sawyer, Peter, ed., (2001) The Oxford Illustrated History of the Vikings (Oxford University Press) ISBN 978-0192854346
