= Haraldshaugen =

National monument in Haugesund, Norway

Coordinates: 59°25′44″N 5°15′32″E

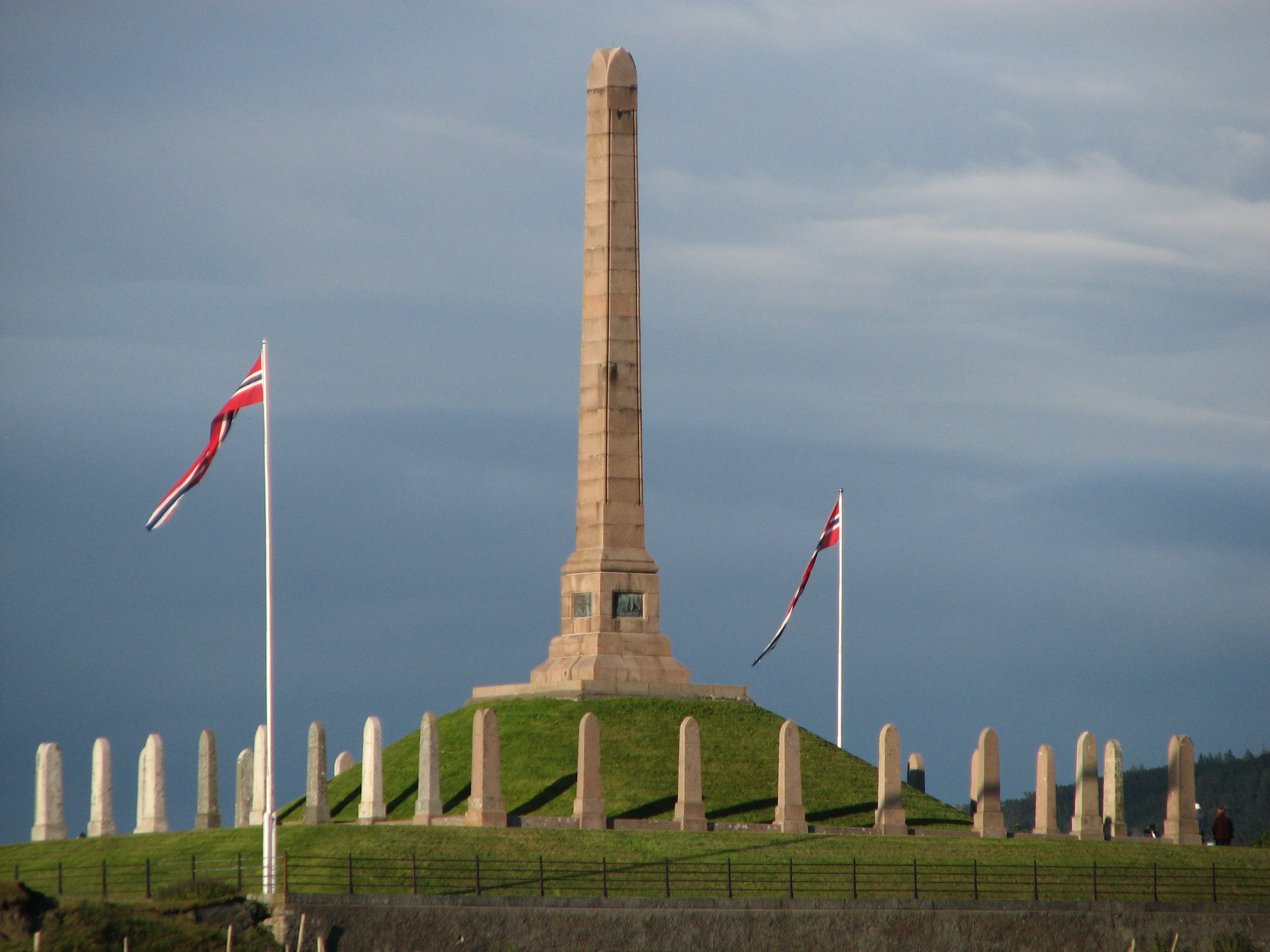
Haraldshaugen

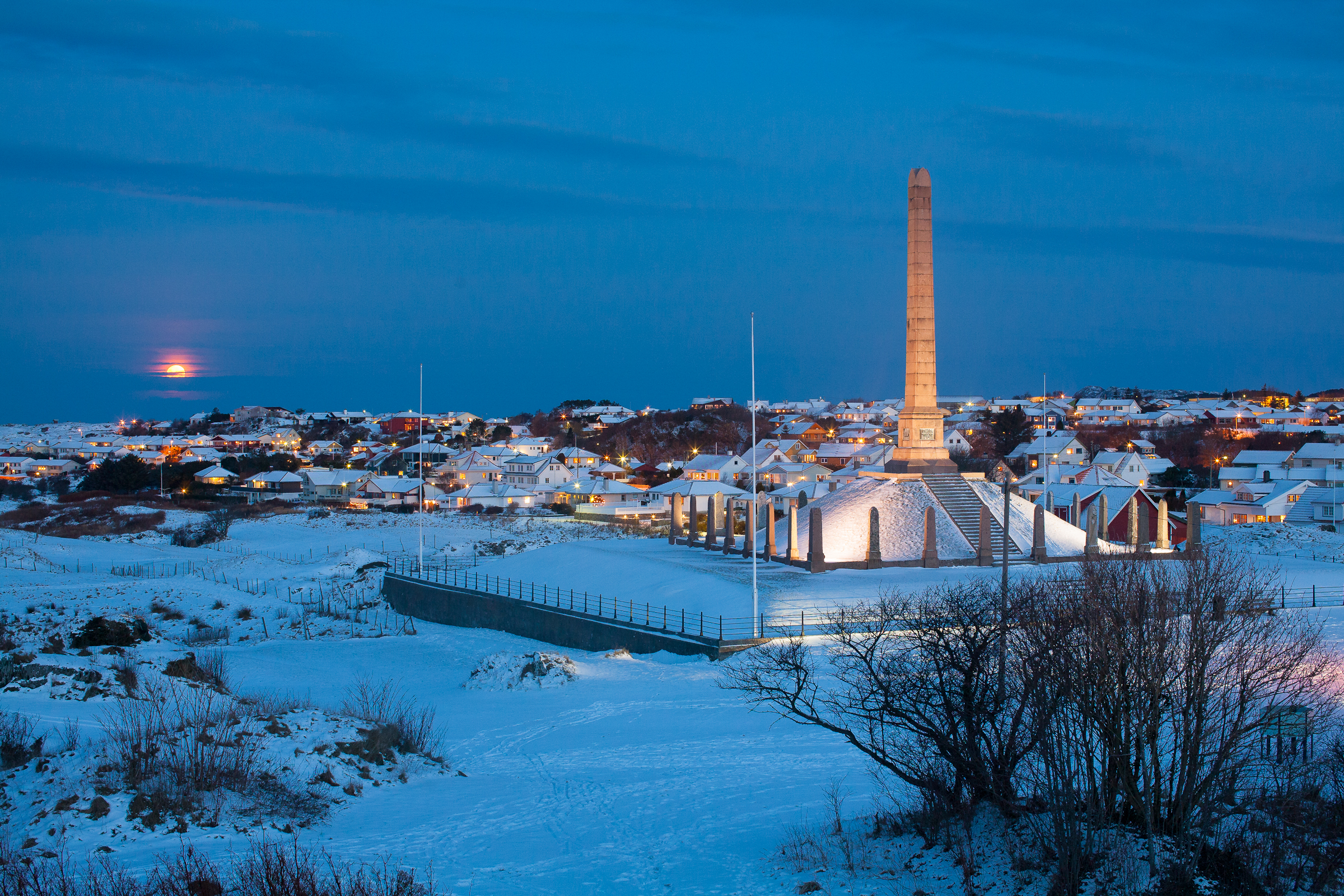
Haraldsstøtta

Haraldshaugen (Norwegian: Riksmonumentet Haraldshaugen) is a national monument in Haugesund, Norway. The monument was erected during the millennial celebration of Norway's unification into one kingdom under the rule of King Harald Fairhair (Norwegian: Harald Hårfagre).

Haraldshaugen was unveiled on 18 July 1872 by Crown Prince Oscar (later King Oscar II of Norway and Sweden) in connection with the one thousand year anniversary of the Battle of Hafrsfjord. The monument is designed by Norwegian architect Christian Christie. Norwegian national poet, Ivar Aasen, wrote a poem entitled Haraldshaugen to commemorate the event. The monument was opposed by Norway's political left, which questioned the merits of celebrating a figure whom they viewed as a brutal, authoritarian conqueror.

Haraldshaugen is located in the northern suburbs of Haugesund. The monument consists of a large mound surrounded by a granite memorial stones with 29 smaller stones, one from each of the historic counties of Norway. At the top of the mound stands a 17m high granite main obelisk, with four bronze panels around the base. Each panel depicts important scenes from the life of King Harald I.

Haraldshaugen commemorates the Battle of Hafrsfjord which commonly dates to the year 872. The Battle of Hafrsfjord has traditionally been regarded as the point in which western Norway was for the first time unified under one monarch. Tradition holds that Haraldshaugen is the burial site of King Harald I, who died circa 933 at Avaldsnes on nearby Karmøy, south of Haugesund, but currently there is no clear archeological evidence of this.
