= Unification of Norway =

Unification of Norway occurred from the 860s to 1020s

Unification of Norway: Rikssamlingen (Bokmål); Rikssamlinga (Nynorsk)
- 872; 860s–1020s: Successive territorial expansion
- Unification process of the petty kingdoms, about 872.
- Capital: Ǫgvaldsnes
- Common languages: Old Norse
- Religion: Norse paganism
- Government: Kingdoms unification
- Kings
  - Before 872: petty kings and earls
  - From 872: Harald Fairhair
- Historical era: Middle Ages
  - Battle of Hakadal: 860s
  - Battle of Orkdal: 870s
  - Battle of Solskjel (1st and 2nd): 870s
  - Götaland Campaign: 870s
  - Battle of Hafrsfjord: 872
  - Battle of Fjaler: 880s
Preceded by	Succeeded by
Petty kingdoms of Norway	Kingdom of Norway (872–1397)

The Unification of Norway (Norwegian Bokmål: Rikssamlingen) is the process by which Norway merged from several petty kingdoms into a single kingdom, predecessor to the modern Kingdom of Norway.

== History ==
King Harald Fairhair is the monarch who is credited by later tradition as having first unified Norway into one kingdom. According to the sagas, he ruled Norway from approximately 872 to 930. Modern historians, including Claus Krag, assume that his rule may have been limited to the coastal areas of western and southern Norway. The tendency in recent research has been to perceive unification of the nation to have been a more time-consuming process.

The sagas recount that Harald succeeded, on the death of his father Halfdan the Black Gudrödarson, to the sovereignty of several small, and somewhat scattered kingdoms in Vestfold, which had come into his father's hands through conquest and inheritance. In 866, Harald made the first of a series of conquests over the many petty kingdoms which would compose Norway, including Värmland in Sweden, and modern day south-eastern Norway, which had sworn allegiance to the Swedish king Erik Eymundsson. In 872, after a great victory at the Battle of Hafrsfjord near Stavanger, Harald found himself king over the whole country.

According to Sverre Bagge, unification of Norway was made easy by excellent sea communications, as well as seas that rarely froze in winter.

His realm was, however, threatened by dangers from outside, as large numbers of his opponents had taken refuge, not only in Iceland, then recently discovered; but also in the Orkney Islands, Shetland Islands, Hebrides Islands and Faroe Islands. His opponents' leaving was not entirely voluntary. Many Norwegian chieftains who were wealthy and respected posed a threat to Harald; therefore, they were subjected to much harassment, prompting them to vacate the land. In time, Harald was forced to make an expedition to subdue these islands.

After Harald's death, the unity of the kingdom was not preserved. In following centuries, the kingdom was variously ruled, wholly or in part, by descendants of King Harald or by earls under the suzerainty of Denmark. Kings of Norway until King Olav IV, who died in 1387, commonly claimed descent from Harald Fairhair.

== Saga descriptions ==
In the Saga of Harald Hårfagre from Heimskringla by Snorri Sturluson, the consolidation of the rule of Norway by Harald Fairhair was somewhat of a love story. The tale begins with a marriage proposal that resulted in rejection and scorn from Gyda, the daughter of Eirik, king of Hordaland. She said she refused to marry Harald "before he was king over all of Norway". Harald was therefore induced to take a vow not to cut nor comb his hair until he was sole king of Norway, and that ten years later, he was justified in trimming it; whereupon he exchanged the epithet "Shockhead" or "Tanglehair" for the one by which he is usually known. Most scholars today regard this story as a literary tale inspired by the Romance stories that were popular at the courts by the time Heimskringla was written.

== Maps of the Norwegian kingdoms ==
These maps are mainly based on later saga sources, from the 13th century. Their historical accuracy has not been established.

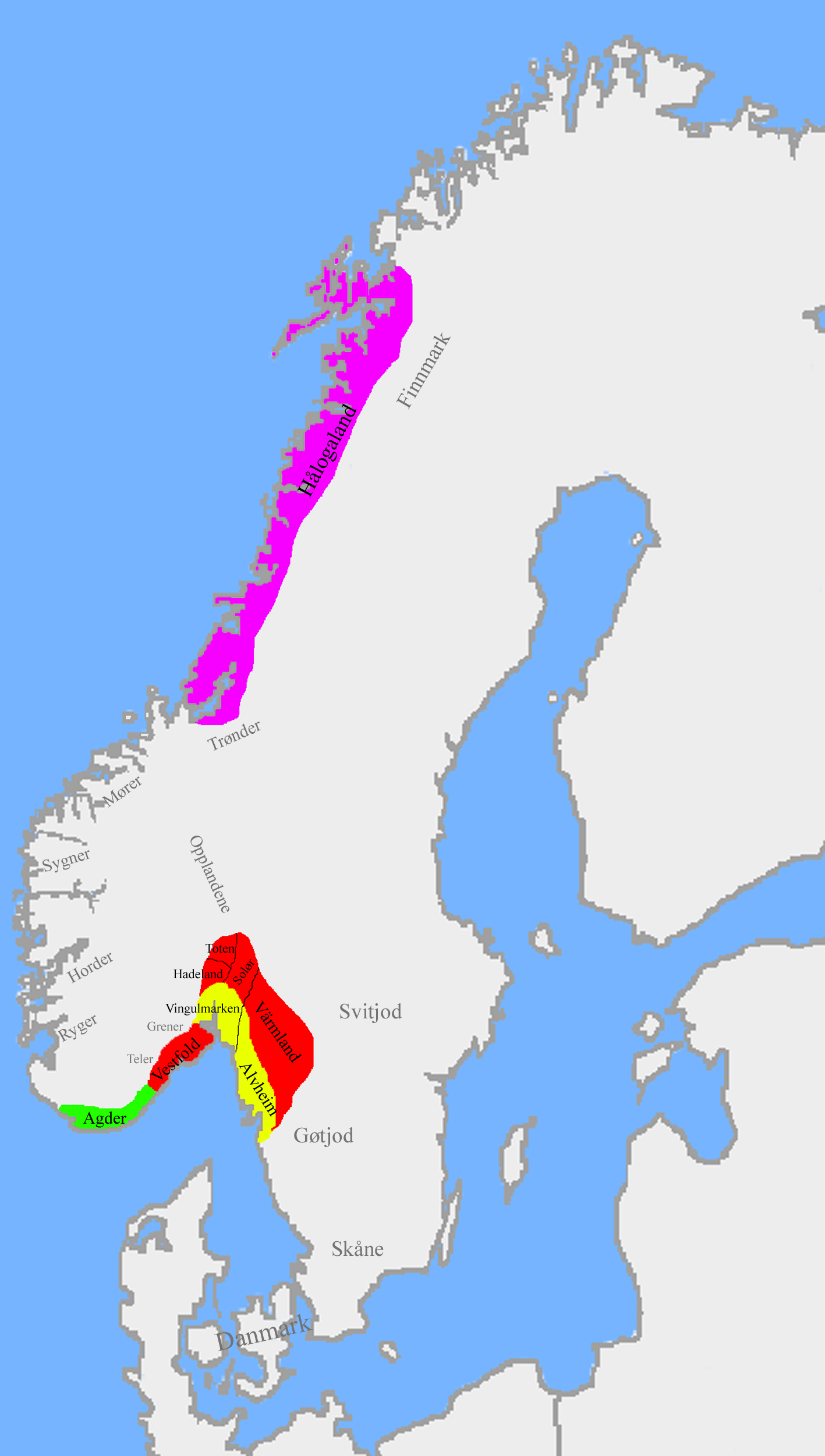
Norwegian petty kingdoms c. 820 AD at the death of Gudrød the Hunter. Major kingdoms: Vestfold (red), Hålogaland (purple), Alvheim (yellow) Agder (green).

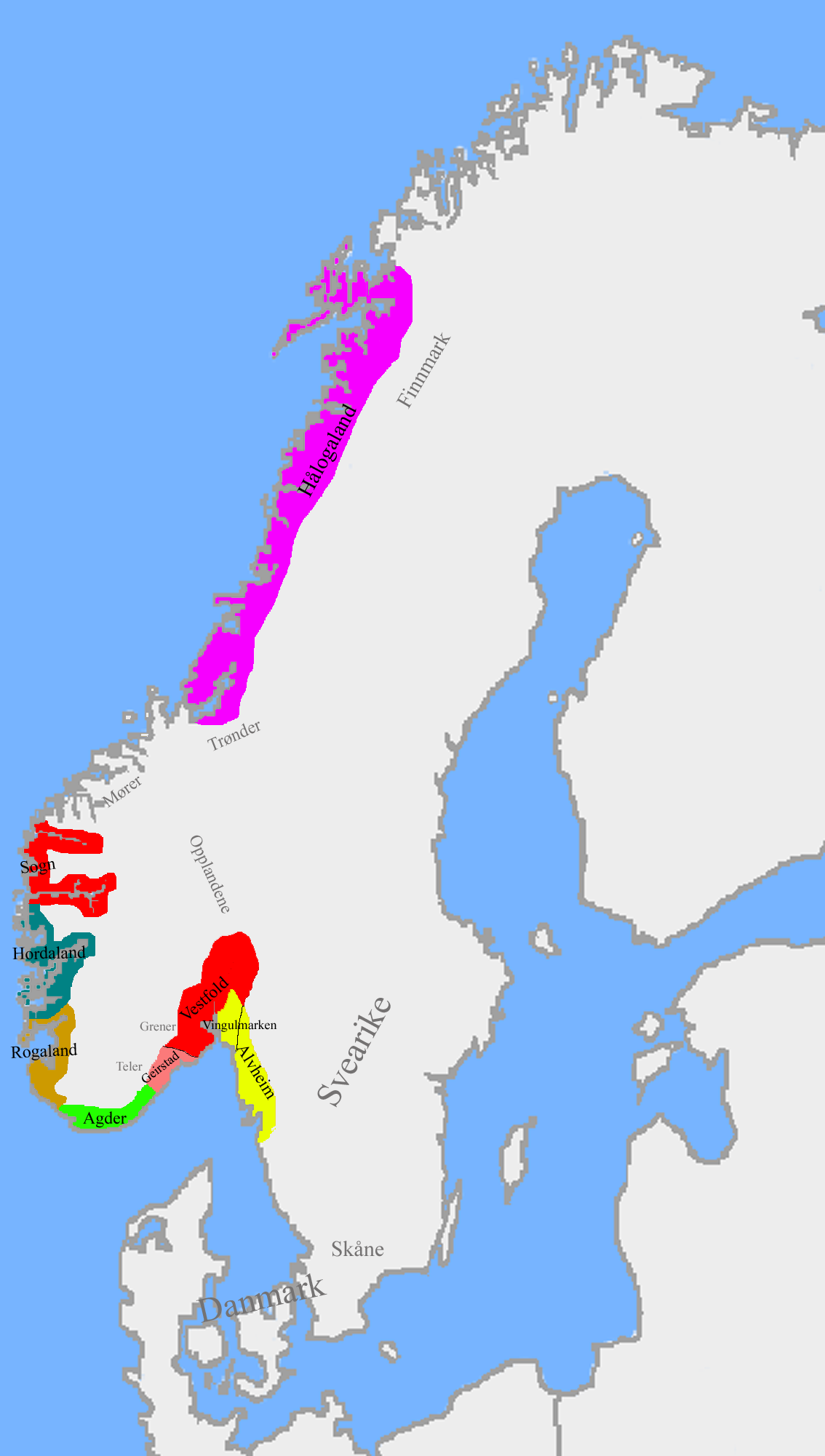
Petty kingdoms c. 860 AD at the death of Halfdan the Black. In red is the kingdom inherited by Harald Fairhair.

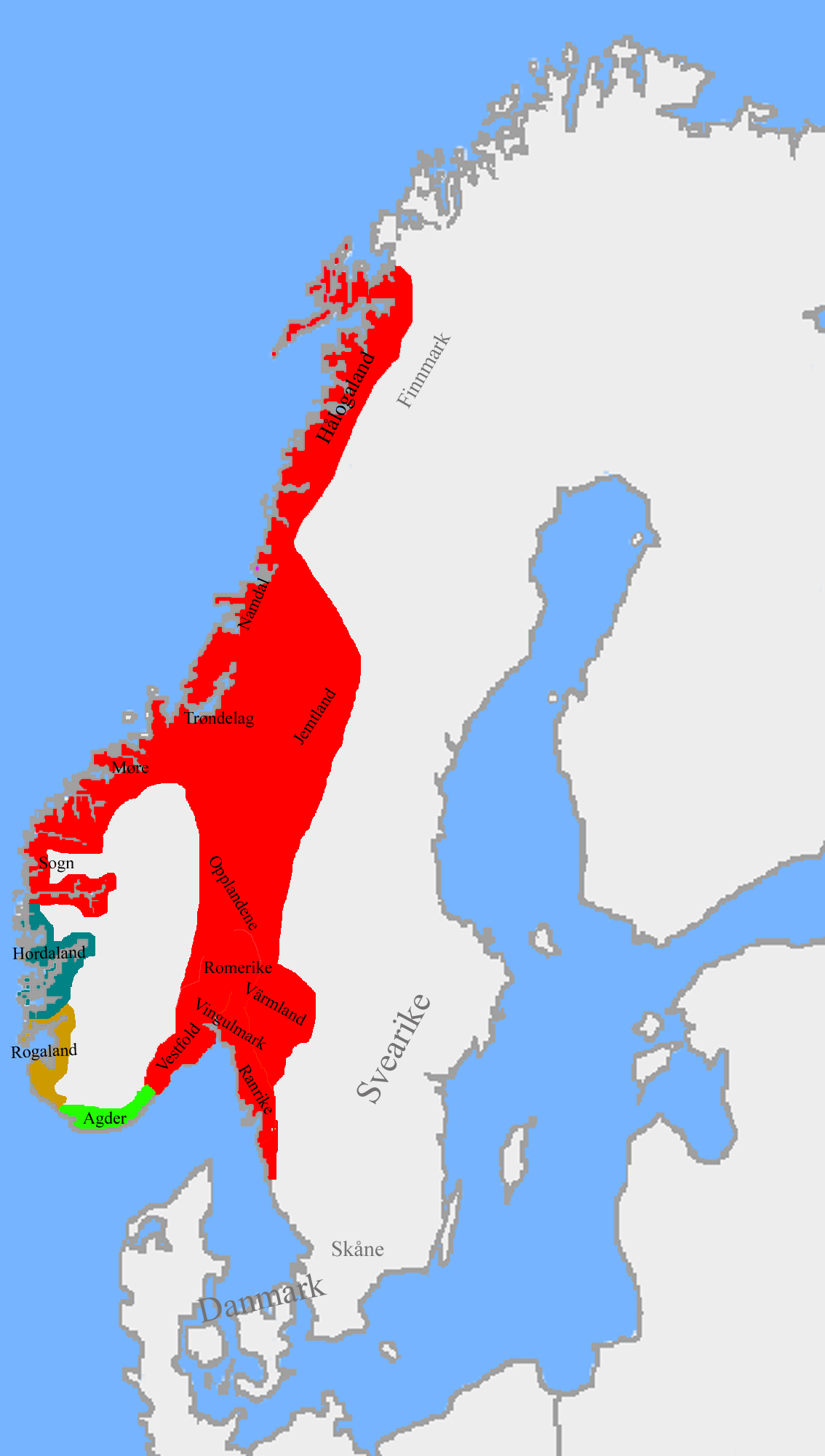
Petty kingdoms c. 872 AD (the unified kingdom shown in red) before the defining Battle of Hafrsfjord.

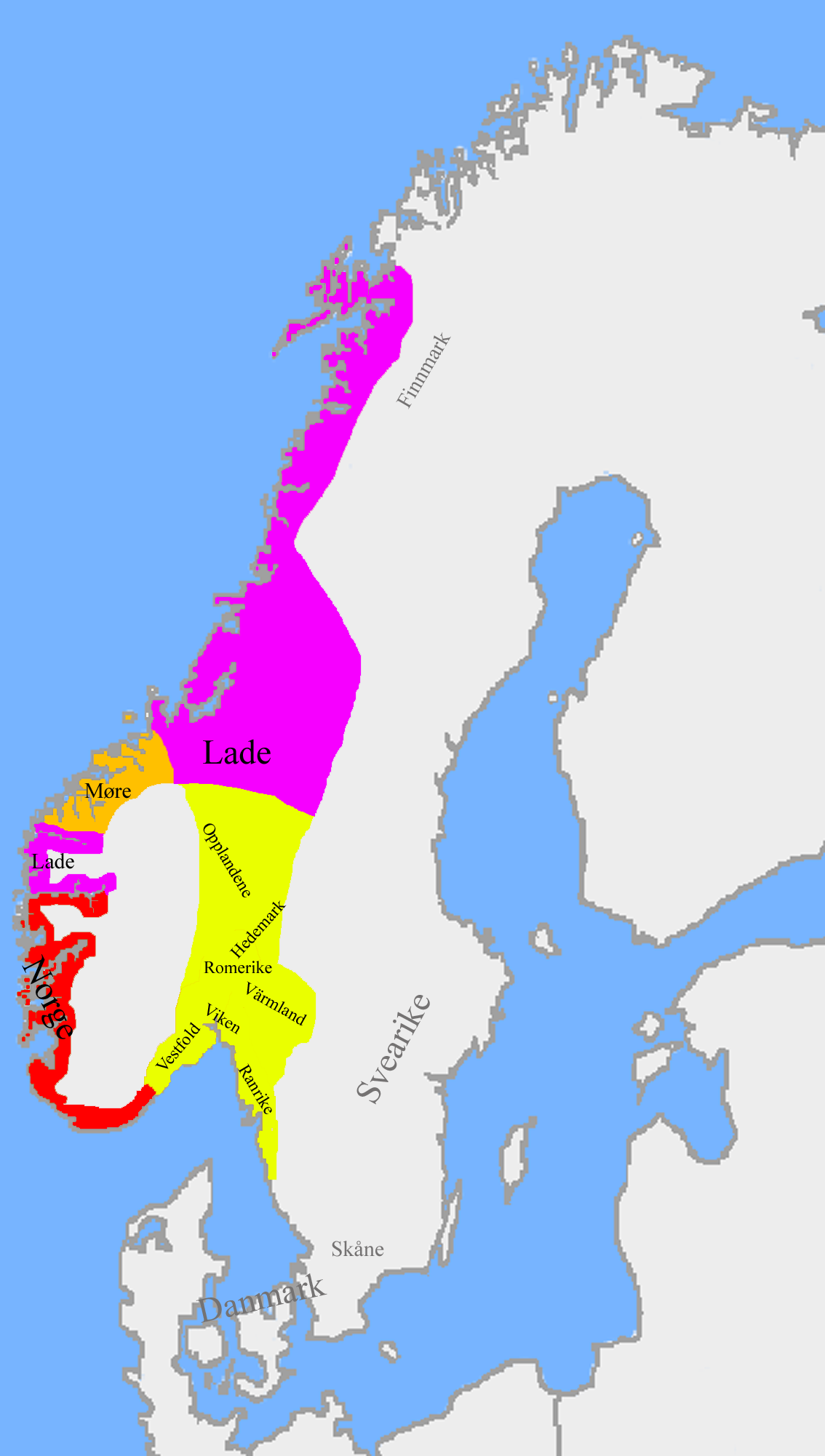
Division of the kingdom c. 930 AD., petty kingdoms assigned to Harald's sons and kinsmen (yellow), Harald's direct rule (red), Earls of Lade (purple), Earls of Møre (orange)

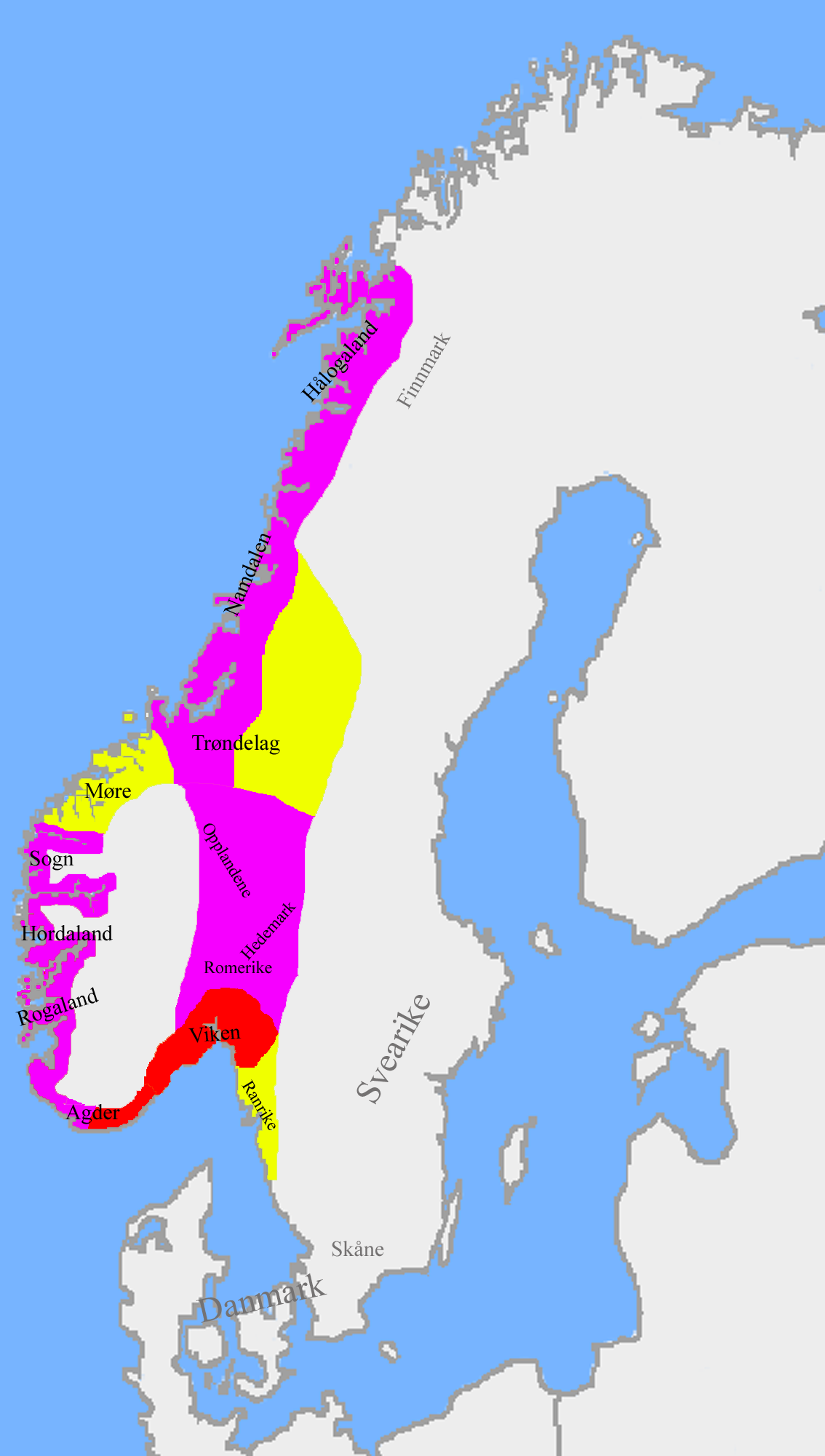
The division of the kingdom after the Battle of Svolder (1000 AD) between Sweden (yellow), Denmark (red) and the jarl of Lade (purple).

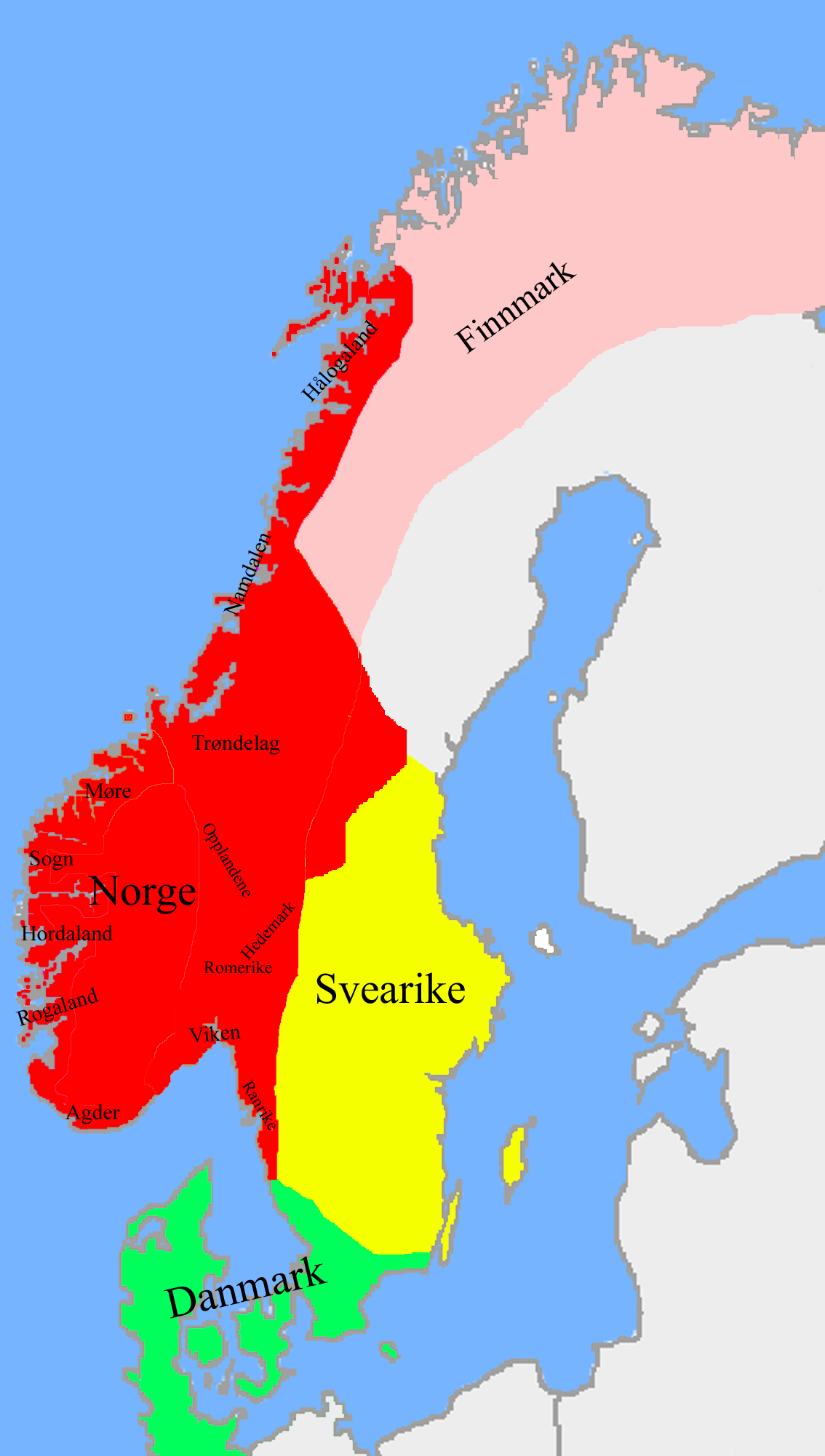
Unified Norway during the reign of Saint Olav c. 1020 AD. In pale red Finnmarken ("Marches of the Sami"), most of which paid tribute to the kings of Norway.

== See also ==
- Battle of Svolder
- Battle of Hafrsfjord
- Battle of Stiklestad

== Primary sources ==
- Andersen, Per Sveaas (1977) Samlingen av Norge og kristningen av landet 800–1130 (Universitetsforlaget) ISBN 978-8200024125
- Krag, Claus (2000) Norges historie fram til 1319 (Universitetsforlaget) ISBN 978-8200129387
- Krag, Claus (1995) Vikingtid og rikssamling 800–1130 (Aschehougs Norgeshistorie) ISBN 82-03-22015-0
- Krøger, Jens Flemming (1997) Rikssamlingen: høvdingmakt og kongemakt (Stavanger: Dreyer) ISBN 9788278590027
- Lidén, Hans-Emil (1995) Møtet mellom hedendom og kristendom i Norge (Universitetsforlaget) ISBN 82-00-22430-9
- Seip, Jens Arup (1974) Utsikt over Norges historie (Oslo: Gyldendal) ISBN 978-8205065154
