= Huntiof, King of Nordmøre =

Huntjov was according to Snorri Sturluson king in Nordmøre before and during Harald Fairhair's wars of conquest. Together with his son Solve Klove and his father-in-law, king Nokkve of Romsdal, he led an army to stop king Harald from advancing south from Trøndelag. At the first battle of Solskjell both kings fell, and their kingdoms were taken by Harald.

Preceded by ?	King of Nordmøre ?–ca. 870	Succeeded by Rognvald Eysteinsson as earl
