= Steinunn Refsdóttir =

Icelandic poet

Steinunn Refsdóttir was an Icelandic skald active at the end of the 10th century. Two verses by her are preserved, in which she taunts the missionary Þangbrandr.

The daughter of Refr hinn mikill ("the Great") and Finna, Steinunn was both descended from and married into a powerful family of heathen priest-chieftains (goðar). She was the mother of the skald Hofgarða-Refr Gestsson.

Kristni saga (9) and Óláfs saga Tryggvasonar en mesta (216) quote two skaldic verses (lausavísur) in which she taunts Þangbrandr, a missionary sent to Iceland by the Norwegian king Óláfr Tryggvason, attributing his shipwreck to the gods and especially Thor, with Christ having offered no help. Brennu-Njáls saga (102) has the verses in reverse order and adds that before speaking them, she told Þangbrandr he would be better off becoming a heathen: "'Did you ever hear,' she asked, 'how Thor challenged Christ to a duel, and Christ did not dare to accept the challenge?'" Here her verses are in answer to Þangbrandr's asking her who she thinks wrecked his ship, and she has the last word. These verses are among the few testimonies of pre-Christian skaldic poetry composed by a woman that have come down to us.
