= Harald Fairhair =

Legendary first king of Norway (c. 850–c. 932)

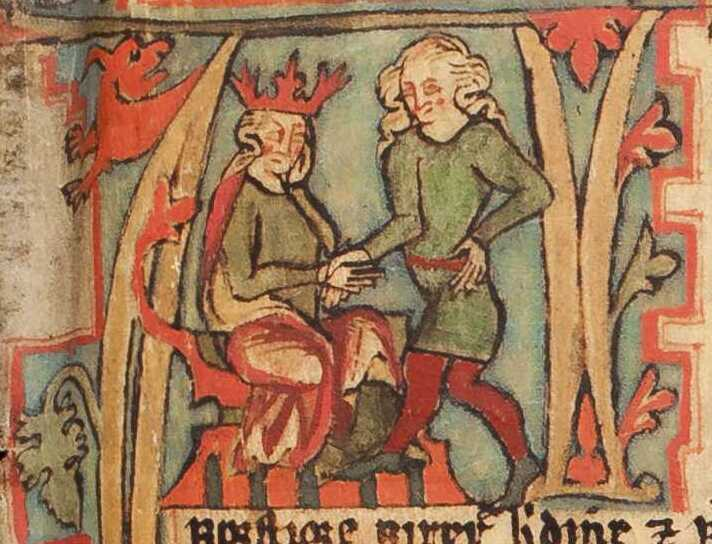
- Harald Fairhair (Right) receiving Norway from his father (Left) in an illustration fourteenth-century Flateyjarbók.

King of Norway
- Reign: putatively 872–930
- Successor: Eric Bloodaxe
- Born: putatively c. 850; Leikanger in Sogn
- Died: putatively c. 932; Rogaland, Norway
- Burial: Haraldshaugen in Haugesund
- Spouse: Ragnhild the Mighty; Åsa Håkonsdotter; Snjófríthr/Snæfrithr Svásadottir
- Issue more: Guttorm Haraldsson; Halfdan Haraldsson the Black; Álof árbót Haraldsdóttir; Bjorn Farmann; Olaf Haraldsson Geirstadalf; Halfdan Long-Leg; Haakon the Good; Eric Bloodaxe
Names
- Haraldr Hálfdanarson
- Dynasty: Fairhair (later tradition); Yngling (early tradition)
- Father: Halfdan the Black
- Mother: Ragnhild Sigurdsdotter
- Religion: Norse paganism

Harald Fairhair (Note: Old Norse: Haraldr hinn hárfagri [ˈhɑrˌɑldr hinː ˈhɑːrˌfɑɣre] Norwegian: Harald hårfagre Modern Icelandic: Haraldur hárfagri [ˈhaːrˌaltʏr ˈhaurˌfaɣrɪ]) (Old Norse: Haraldr Hárfagri; c. 850 – c. 932) was a Norwegian king. According to traditions current in Norway and Iceland in the eleventh and twelfth centuries, he reigned from c. 872 to 930 and was the first King of Norway. Supposedly, two of his sons, Eric Bloodaxe and Haakon the Good, succeeded Harald to become kings after his death.

Much of Harald's biography is uncertain. A couple of praise poems by his court poet Þorbjörn Hornklofi survive in fragments, but the extant accounts of his life come from sagas set down in writing around three centuries after his lifetime. His life is described in several of the Kings' sagas, none of them older than the twelfth century. Their accounts of Harald and his life differ on many points, but it is clear that in the twelfth and thirteenth centuries Harald was regarded as having unified Norway into one kingdom.

Since the nineteenth century, when Norway was in a personal union with Sweden, Harald has become a national icon of Norway and a symbol of independence. Though the king's sagas and medieval accounts have been critically scrutinised during the twentieth and early twenty-first centuries, Harald maintains a reputation as the father of the Norwegian nation. At the turn of the 21st century, a few historians have argued that Harald Fairhair did not exist as a historical figure.

== Meaning of epithet hárfagri ==
Old Norse hár translates straightforwardly into English as 'hair', but fagr, the adjective of which fagri is a form, is trickier to render, since it means 'fair, fine, beautiful' (but without the moral associations of English fair, as opposed to unfair). Although it is convenient and conventional to render hárfagri in English as 'fair-hair(ed)', in English 'fair-haired' means 'blond', whereas the Old Norse fairly clearly means 'beautiful-haired' (in contrast to the epithet which, according to some sources, Haraldr previously bore: lúfa, '(thick) matted hair'). Accordingly, some translators prefer to render hárfagri as 'the fine-haired' or 'fine-hair' (which, however, unhelpfully implies that Haraldr's hairs were thin) or even 'handsome-hair'.

== Historicity ==
Through the nineteenth and most of the twentieth centuries, historians broadly accepted the account of Harald Fairhair given by later Icelandic sagas. However, Peter Sawyer began to cast doubt on this in 1976, and the decades around 2000 saw a wave of revisionist research that suggested that Harald Fairhair did not exist, or at least not in a way resembling his appearance in sagas. The key arguments for this are as follows:

- There is no contemporary support for the claims of later sagas about Harald Fairhair. The first king of Norway recorded in near-contemporary sources is Harald Bluetooth (d. c. 985/986), who is claimed to be the king not only of Denmark but also Norway on the Jelling stones. The late ninth-century account of Norway provided by Ohthere to the court of Alfred the Great (about 890) and the history by Adam of Bremen written in 1075 record no King of Norway for the relevant period. Although sagas have Erik Bloodaxe, who does seem partly to correspond to a historical figure, as the son of Harald Fairhair, no independent evidence supports this genealogical connection. The twelfth-century William of Malmesbury does describe a Norwegian king called Haraldus visiting King Æthelstan of England (d. 939), which is consistent with later saga-traditions in which Harald Fairhair fostered a son, Hákon Aðalsteinsfóstri, on Æthelstan. But William is a late source and Harald a far from uncommon name for a Scandinavian character, and William does not give this Harald the epithet fairhair, whereas he does give that epithet to the later Norwegian king Haraldr Sigurðarson.
- Although Harald Fairhair appears in diverse Icelandic sagas, few if any of these are independent sources. It is plausible that all these were participating in a shared textual tradition begun by the earliest Icelandic prose account of Harald, Ari Þorgilsson's Íslendingabók. Dating from the early twelfth century, this was written over 250 years after Harald's supposed death.
- The saga evidence is potentially pre-dated by two skaldic poems, Haraldskvæði (also known as Hrafnsmál) and Glymdrápa, which have been attributed to Þorbjörn hornklofi or alternatively (in the case of the first poem) to Þjóðólfr of Hvinir, and are according to the sagas about Harald Fairhair. Although only preserved in thirteenth-century Kings' sagas, they might have been transmitted orally (as the sagas claim) from the tenth century. The first describes life at the court of a king called Harald, mentions that he took a Danish wife, and that he won a battle at Hafrsfjord. The second poem relates a series of battles won by a king called Harald. However, the information supplied in these poems is inconsistent with the tales in the sagas in which they are transmitted, and the sagas themselves often disagree on the details of his background and biography. Meanwhile, the most reliable manuscripts of Haraldskvæði call the poem's honorand Haraldr Hálfdanarson rather than Haraldr hárfagri, and Glymdrápa offers no epithet at all. All the poems suggest is that there was once a king called Haraldr (Hálfdanarson).
- Sources from the British Isles which are independent of the Icelandic saga-tradition (and partly of each other), and are mostly earlier than the sagas, do attest to a king whose name corresponds to the Old Norse name Haraldr inn hárfagri—but they use this name of the well attested Haraldr Sigurðarson (d. 1066, often known in modern English as Harald Hardrada). These sources include manuscript D of the Anglo-Saxon Chronicle ('Harold Harfagera', under the year 1066) and the related histories by Orderic Vitalis ('Harafagh', re events in 1066), John of Worcester ('Harvagra', s.aa. 1066 and 1098), and William of Malmesbury (Gesta regum Anglorum, 'Harvagre', s.a. regarding 1066); Marianus Scotus of Mainz ('Arbach', d. 1082/1083); and the Life of Gruffydd ap Cynan ('Haraldum Harfagyr', later twelfth century, though this may refer to two different kings by this name).

Scholarly consensus on Harald's historicity now falls into two camps. One suggests that the medieval Icelandic and Norwegian historiography of Harald Fairhair is part of an origin myth created to explain the settlement of Iceland, perhaps in which a cognomen of Haraldr Sigurðarson was transferred to a fictitious early king of all Norway. Sverrir Jakobsson has suggested that the idea of Iceland being settled by people fleeing an overbearing Norwegian monarch actually reflects the anxieties of Iceland in the early thirteenth century, when the island was indeed coming under Norwegian dominance. He has also suggested that the legend of Harald Fairhair developed in the twelfth century to enable Norwegian kings, who were then promoting the idea of primogeniture over the older custom of agnatic succession, to claim that their ancestors had had a right to Norway by lineal descent from the country's supposed first king.

One possibility advanced is that Harald Fairhair was based on a historical king called Harald, perhaps also known as "hárfagri", who ruled Vestlandet. The legend of this Harald later grew into the figure of medieval tradition. Historians who accept the early dating of skaldic poetry such as Claus Krag and Hans Jacob Orning tend to accept Harald's existence, while remaining skeptical regarding the saga accounts. In 2015, Hans Jacob Orning, building on then-recent archaeology and Krag's work, argued that Harald was based in Sogn, an area which the medieval Icelandic historian Snorri Sturluson associated with Harald, and which was a centre of power in the ninth century. In the skaldic poetry (which is generally considered authentic ninth-century work by linguists) the estates mentioned match a convenient network of estates with about a day's traveling distance between them, which would be ideal for a king ruling in Vestlandet, but not all of Norway. This reading could be consistent with the Historia Norwegiæ's account. While it is possible that Harald could have controlled other areas through jarls and client kings, this is difficult to prove with available archeology. Krag has noted that Snorri's account of Harald's origin in Vestfold might have been propaganda as the area of Viken was disputed between the Norwegian and Danish crown in the thirteenth century. Krag points of that Othere describes Viken as Danish territory and Hrafnsmál's description of the battle of Hafrsfjord suggest that Harald was attacked by "eastern" enemies that were routed and fled back east. He proposes that the battle was not part of a war of conquest but Harald defending his own territory from invaders. This idea offers a very different reading of the poem where its references to the dróttin Norðmanna (lord of the northmen) might have originally meant referred to the leader of the Norwegians in the battle, but later recontextualised as the lord of all Norwegians.

== Attestations ==
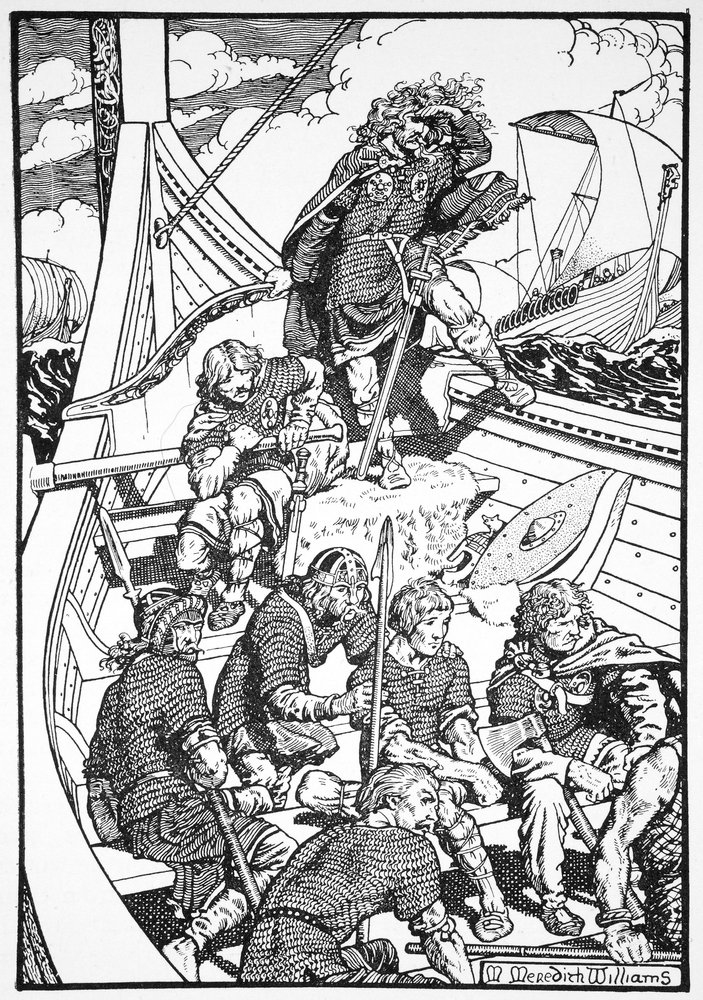
Harald Fairhair as imagined by Morris Meredith Williams

Harald is mentioned in several sagas, some which quotes supposedly older skaldic poetry. If the linguistic dating of the poems are correct, they represent the earliest accounts of Harald Fairhair.

=== Hrafnsmál ===
Hrafnsmál, also known as Haraldskvæði, is a fragmentary skaldic poem generally accepted as being written by the 9th-century skald Þorbjörn Hornklofi. There does not exist a complete copy of the poem, and modern editions of the poem are based on the compilation of the segments. Through dating of the parts as well as the meter is consistent, they may be separate compositions but scholarly consensus is indecisive. Part of the poem is cited by Snorri in Heimskringla as a source for his narrative of the Battle of Hafrsfjord, while another is cited in Fagrskinna as information about Harald. Both credits Hornklofi as the composer.

Hrafnsmál largely consists of a conversation between an unnamed valkyrie and a raven; the two discuss the life and martial deeds of Harald Fairhair. The bulk of the poem seems to describe the Battle of Hafrsfjord, were Harald faced off against Kjotve the Rich and Hakláng. The poem includes elements ubiquitous to later tellings of the king: Harald is described as the son of a Halfdan and an Yngling, but does not use his famous nickname hárfagri (fairhair), but uses his widely cited previous nickname Lufa. (Note: Some transcripts does include a mention of Hárfagra in stanza 1, but theses are considered the more unreliable transcripts and in the best transcripts the stanza is slightly different, with no mention of Hárfagra) The poem mentions Ragnhild, who in Heimskringla is presented as Harald's queen and mother of Eirik Bloodaxe, as well as the following of ulfheðnar warriors that the saga tradition ascribes to Harald.

=== Glymdrápa ===
Like Hrafnsmál, Glymdrápa is a praise poem attributed to Þorbjörn Hornklofi about various battles won by Harald. It is dated to the late 9th century, but an exact dating is difficult and due to its fragmentary presentation it may be a compilation of unrelated stanzas. Unlike Hrafnsmál its relation to Harald and the events it supposedly relates to in Heimskringla is ambiguous.

=== Sendibitr ===
Sendibitr, the last and shortest poem Snorri quotes is attributed to Jórunn skáldmær (Jorunn the skaldmaiden), one of few female poets mentioned in the sagas. It deals with a conflict between Harald and his son Halfdan, identified in Heimskringla as Halfdan the Black (the Younger), Harald's son by Åsa Håkonsdottir. Finnur Jónsson dates this poem to the late 10th century. If the dating is correct, it is the first instance of Harald having the epithet "fairhair" (hárfagra in the text). However, consensus is that the exact dating is uncertain. It has been suggested that the poem refers to past events, which would mean the poet lived in a later time than the events described in the poem. Linguistic dating of the poem has not been successful.

=== Íslendingabók ===
The earliest narrative source which mentions Harald, the early twelfth-century Íslendingabók, differs from later tradition in that Harald is not presented as the cause of the Norwegian migration to Iceland. Rather his reign is primary used as time reference and his role in the settlement is imposing taxes to prevent people from resettling, fearing a depopulation of Norway.

The author Ari Þorgilsson recounts a tradition that Ingólfr Arnarson first traveled to Iceland in the year 870, "[I]n the days of Halfdan the Black's son Harald Fairhair, around the time when Ragnar Lodbrok's son Ivar killed Edmund the holy". Harald is said to have lived to the age of 80 and been king for 70 (a detail elaborated on in later sagas). Ari presents Harald's forefathers as Olof Trätälja (noted as "king of Swedes"), Halfdan Hvitbeinn, Eystein Halfdansson (given unexplained nickname "fart"), Halfdan the Mild,Gudrød the Hunter and Halfdan the Black, his father. It also describes Olaf Tryggvason's descent from Harald through Harald's son Olaf Geirstad-Alf and grandson Tryggve Olafsson, the father of Tryggve. Ari also presents a genealogy between Harald Fairhair, Saint Olaf and Harald Hardrada the later two being described as Fairhair's great great grandsons. This is the earliest source to map out these relations.

Ari notably does not present Harald as an Yngling, rather putting forward a different genealogy from Halfdan Hvitbeinn which eventually ends with Ari himself. It is the earliest non-skaldic account of Harald to use the nickname hárfagri. Notably Harald is described as the first of his family to be king of all Norway, but makes it ambiguous if there were other kings before him.

=== Skarðsárbók ===
The Skarðsárbók-version of Landnámabók includes a brief narrative of Harald and his background. Harald is here described as the great-grandson of Sigurd Snake-in-the-Eye through his daughter Áslaug, her son Sigurd Hart and his daughter Ragnhild. The text describes Halfdan the Black's death by going through the ice on Randsfjorden, a story also told by Snorri in Heimskringla, and that Harald became king afterwards. He is said to have taken control of Sogn from Atli jarl due to him never paying taxes. This happened before Harald's conquest of Norway.

=== Ágrip af Nóregskonungasögum ===
Ágrip af Nóregskonungasögum is dated to about 1190. Here Harald is described as having become the first king of all of Norway at the age of 20. It describes a battle in Hafrsvágr (as opposed of Hafrifjord) against a king called Skeithar-Brandr (Skeiðar-Brandr). The text quotes a poem called "Oddmjór" which describes Harald as a Scylding were as other sources calls him an Yngling. He is described to as having waged wars for 10 years before having conquered all of Norway. He is said to have had 20 children, but that only Eirik Bloodaxe & Hakon the Good becoming kings. In this account, Eirik is described as Harald's eldest son and Hakon as the youngest. Only one of Harald's wives/concubines is named, Snjófríthr, daughter of Svási (Norwegian: Svåse), a beautiful sami-woman. She is described as having died three years after their marriage with Harald mourning for her, but the people mourning for him, considering him bewitched. Eirik is said to have succeeded Harald, ruling for five years, with two as a co-ruler with his father. Hákon eventually supplanted the cruel and oppressive rule of Eirik and his wife Gunnhildr. Hákon is said to be a Christian, but swayed from Christianity due to his unnamed pagan wife and his will to please his people.

=== Historia Norwegiæ ===
Historia Norwegiæ, which is dated to about 1220, mentions that Iceland was discovered in the time of Harald Fairhair by Ingólfr Arnarson and Hjörleifr Hróðmarsson. The work describes the history of the Yngling-dynasty from the legendary king Ingvi as Harald's ancestors and Halfdan the Black was his father. Halfdan is here described as ruling a mountainous region of Norway and having drowned in Rondvatnet. Harald's rule is said to have lasted for 73 years and his nickname derived from his beautiful hair. Notably, Harald is here described as being the first to rule the entire coastal region of Norway, as opposed to all of Norway. The interior is described to as having been ruled by petty kings, however, it is said that Harald as good as ruled this region as well.

This account describes Eirik Bloodaxe as the oldest son of Harald, unlike in Heimskringla. Hákon is not referred to as "the good" and is Harald's second son, not his youngest. This account of Hákon suggest that he did not accept Christianity. Like the later Heimskringla, Ragnvald Rettilbeine is described as killed on Harald's orders. In Heimskringla he is burned alive by Eirik Bloodaxe, while Historia Norwegiæ describes Ragnvald as being drowned.

=== Fagrskinna ===
Fagrskinna is thought to have been written around 1220 and is a catalogue of the kings of Norway. The first part describes Harald Fairhair's birth ancestry in form of his paternal grandfather Gudrød the Hunter and maternal grandfather Sigurd Snake-in-the-Eye, and his parents Halfdan the Black and Ragnhildr. The text also describes Halfdan having another son called Harald by another woman named Ragnhildr, daughter of the king Harald Goldbeard of Sogn. Halfdan's first Harald inherited Sogn after the death of Harald Goldbeard, and then died himself. Halfdan then inherited Sogn from his first son. The story is repeated by Snorri in Heimskringla and suggests two conflicting stories of Harald's ancestry being combined into one. Harald Fairhair is said to have inherited Halfdan's lands at a young age after the king drowned in the lake Rǫnd in Rykinsvik. The text then cites the poem Hrafnsmál at length as an example of Harald's nobility and prowess in battle. Harald appointed Atli the Slender as jarl of Fjaler, but that the two fell out. In this time Harald meet jarl Håkon Grjotgardsson (called Hákon the Old in the text) at a feast in Hladir (Lade) in Trondheim and gave him part of Atli's fief. Atli defended his old area with violence and both of the jarls were killed. Harald proclaimed he would not cut his hair until having become overlord of Norway and earning tribute from every inland valley and outlying headland, earning him the nickname "Lufa", shockhead. Harald is said to have fought many battles, including a decisive battle in Hafrfjord against Kjotve the Rich and Haklang. After this battle, all of Norway is said to have paid tribute to Harald. Ragnvald jarl then cut Harald's hair and gave him the nickname Fairhair.

The text then described Harald's various sons, describing Eirik Bloodaxe as his most beloved and one of his oldest. Harald named Eirik his heir and died in Rogaland from old age and was buried in Haugesund.

=== Heimskringla ===
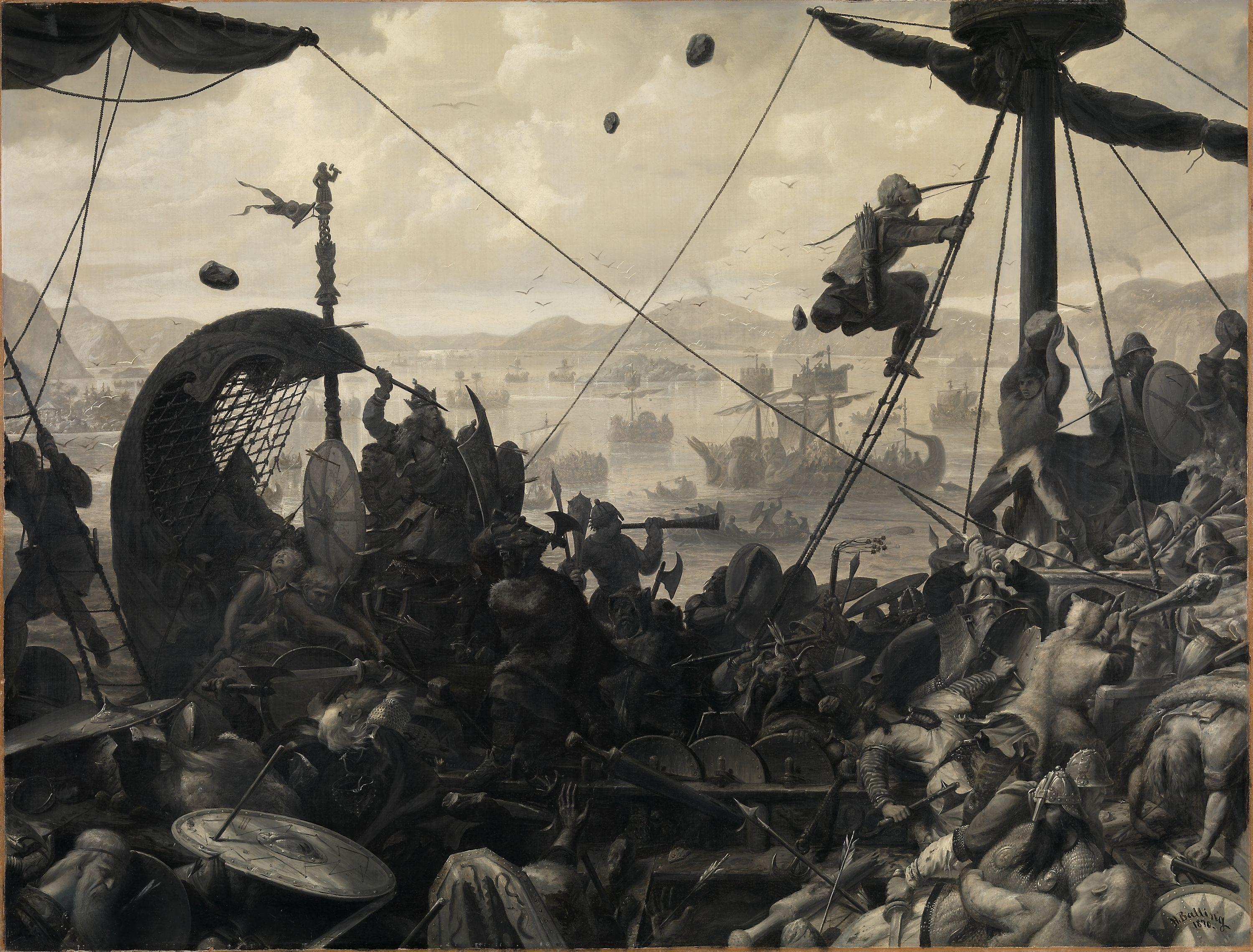
Harald the Fairhaired in the Battle at Hafrsfjord, painting by Ole Peter Hansen Balling

In the Saga of Harald Fairhair in Heimskringla (written around 1230), which is the most elaborate although not the oldest or most reliable source to the life of Harald, it is written that Harald succeeded, on the death of his father Halfdan the Black Gudrödarson in Rondvatnet, to the sovereignty of several small, and somewhat scattered kingdoms in Vestfold, which had come into his father's hands through conquest and inheritance. His protector-regent was his mother's brother duke Guthorm. He is described as the descendant of the Yngling-dynasty, whose history is described earlier in the work.

The unification of Norway is something of a love story. It begins with a marriage proposal that resulted in rejection and scorn from Gyda, the daughter of Eirik, king of Hordaland. She said she refused to marry Harald "before he was king over all of Norway". Harald was therefore induced to take a vow not to cut nor comb his hair until he was "þjóðkonungr" (people-king) of Norway, and when he was justified in trimming it ten years later, he exchanged the epithet "Shockhead" or "Tanglehair" (Haraldr lúfa) for the one by which he is usually known. (Note: The historicity of the nickname and the anecdote around it is considered suspect by some scholars. Whaley 1993, pp. 122–123, citing Moe (1926), pp. 134–140.)

In 866, Harald made the first of a series of conquests over the many petty kingdoms which would compose all of Norway, including Värmland in Sweden, which had sworn allegiance to the Swedish saga-king Erik Eymundsson (whose historicity is not confirmed). Marching up through the Uplands and into Trondheim and then south along the coast Harald subdued many petty kings. Snorri credits his success to excellent leadership by him and his uncle Guthorm, as well as military reforms and his hard tax policy. The taxes demanded by Harald were much higher than other kings and a third of the revenues were given to his jarls. This made jarls and rich farmers flock to his cause to enrich themself. One of these was Håkon Grjotgardsson of Trondheim who allied with Harald and married off his daughter Åsa to him. Harald established the royal estate of Hlade in Trondheim and Håkon became the first of the Earls of Lade, a family which would be one of the dominating forces in Norway for the next 150 years. Harald's third principal ally was Rognvald Eysteinsson, jarl of Møre. Snorri describes Rognvald as Harald's closest friend and the one to coin the name "Fairhair". Harald is said to have fathered Bjørn Farmann and Olav Geirstadalv with Rognvald's sister Svanhild, ancestors of the famous Christian kings Olav Tryggvason (named after his grandfather Olav Geirstadalv) and Olav the Holy.

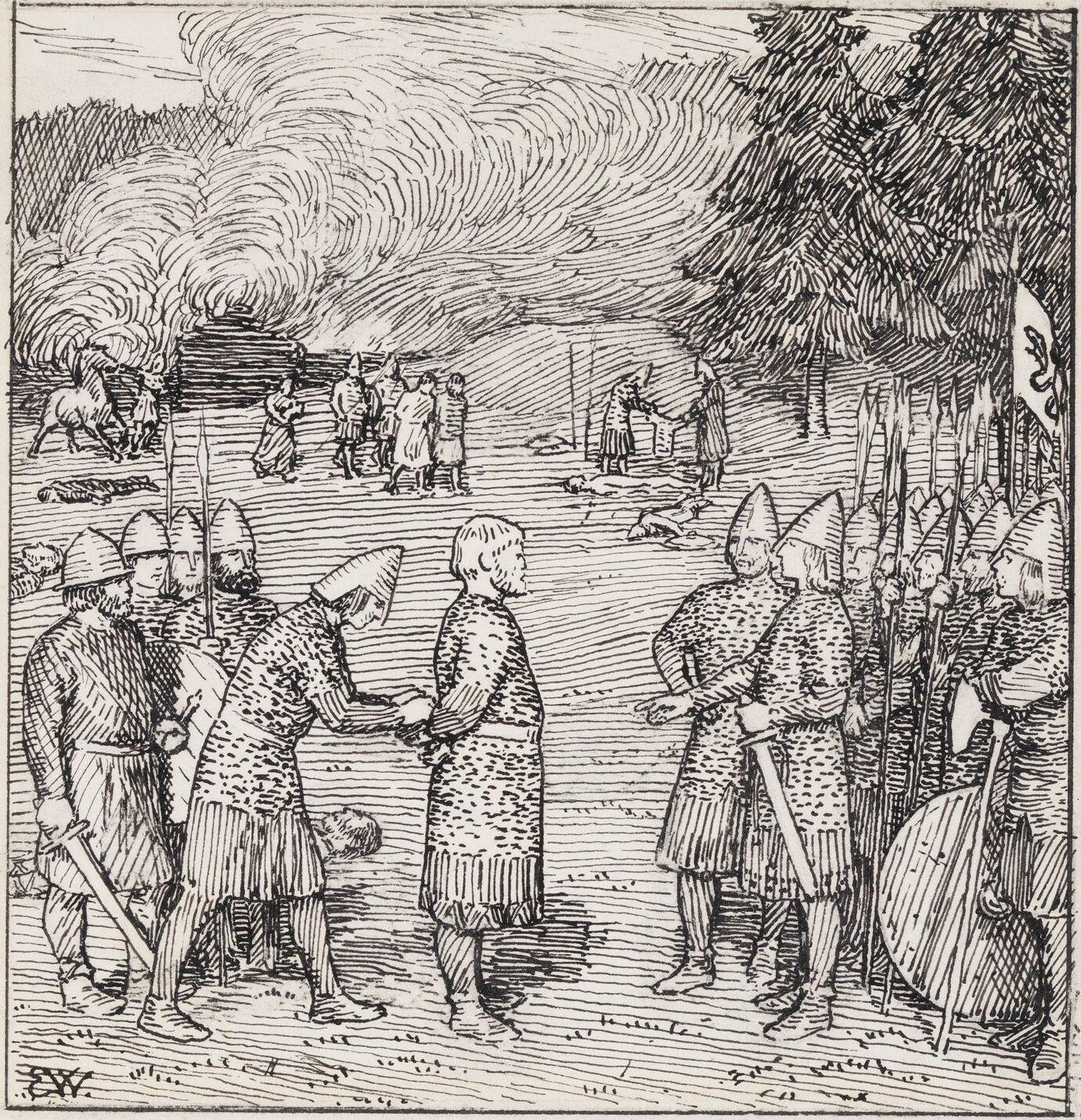
A scene from Heimskringla: King Gryting is brought before Harald after being defeated in battle.

In 872, after a great victory at Hafrsfjord near Stavanger against Kjotve the Rich, Harald found himself king over the whole country, ruling from his Kongsgård seats at Avaldsnes and Alrekstad. His realm was, however, threatened by dangers from without, as large numbers of his opponents had taken refuge, not only in Iceland, then recently discovered; but also in the Orkney Islands, Shetland Islands, Hebrides Islands, Faroe Islands and the northern European mainland. However, his opponents' leaving was not entirely voluntary. Many Norwegian chieftains who were wealthy and respected posed a threat to Harald; therefore, they were subjected to much harassment from Harald, prompting them to vacate the land. At last, Harald was forced to make an expedition to the West, to clear the islands and the Scottish mainland of some Vikings who tried to hide there. (Note: According to Peter H. Sawyer, this expedition probably never took place, cf. "Harald Fairhair and the British Isles", in "Les Vikings et leurs civilisation", ed. R. Boyer (Paris, 1976), pp. 105–09)

Snorri describes Harald's marriage to the daughter of Svási, here called Snæfrithr, but in his account they are described as jötnar rather than finns (sami). Gyda is said to have been made a friðla (concubine) of Harald after her father Eirik of Hordaland had been killed in battle by Harald's followers. Harald is said to have divorced Åsa and rejected Gyda and several other concubines to marry a Jutish princess called Ragnhild the Mighty. The couple only had one child, Eirik Bloodaxe, before her premature death. Eirik Bloodaxe was named after Ragnhild's father as was custom in medieval Scandinavia. Likely due to Eirik Bloodaxe royal mother, he was favored above Harald's other sons. Eirik himself had unquestioning loyalty to Harald. Unlike other authors, Snorri does not attribute Eirik's cruelty solely to Gunnhild. When Harald and Snæfrith's son Ragnvald Rettilbeine became known as patron of sorcerers and a practitioner of magic, Harald ordered him to cease such activity. When Ragnvald did not listen Harald sent Eirik Bloodaxe to murder him. Eirik had his half-brother and all of his sorcerers burned in their hall. When Bjørn Farmann was killed in a conflict with Eirik, Harald stepped in on Eirik's side against his other sons.

There are several accounts of large feasting mead halls constructed for important feasts when Scandinavian royalty was invited. The Värmlandish chieftain Áki (Swedish Åke jarl) invited both king Harald Fairhair and the Swedish saga-king Erik Eymundsson, but had the Norwegian king stay in the newly constructed and sumptuous one, because he was the youngest one of the kings and the one who had the greatest prospects. The older Swedish king, in contrast, had to stay in the old feasting hall. The Swedish king was so humiliated that he killed Áki. Harald drove Erik Eymundsson out of Värmland and inserted Áki's son Ubbi (Swedish: Ubbe) as jarl. Harald is then said to have made a punitive raid into Västra Götaland, to weaken Erik Eymundsson. (Note: It is uncertain if Västra Götaland was part of the early Swedish kingdom at this point. In Snorri's time it was, and Snorri might have connected the episodes to each other based on the borders of his own time)

As Harald's sons came of age their unruly behavior became a source of instability in Norway. Snæfrith's sons Halfdan Long-Leg and Gudrød Ljome burned Rognvald jarl alive in his hall and took his lands in More and Orkney. Halfdan Long-Legs was killed on Orkney by Rognvald's son Torf-Einarr and Gudrød was brought to justice by Harald. The estates in Møre are returned to Rognvald's other son Thorir the Silent who was given Harald's daughter Ålov in marriage as compensation. A variation of this story also appears in Orkneyinga saga. Afterwards, Gudrød was kept in Harald's hird, in a position where Harald could prevent him from similar transgressions.

The account describes Hákon the good as Harald's youngest son, through a servant named Thora.

=== Egil's Saga ===
The thirteenth-century Egil's Saga presents a broadly similar account to that of Heimskringla, though its depiction of Harald and his family is much more negative. It has been suggested that Heimskringla and Egil's Saga share Snorri Sturluson as author, or at least share a common source. Given the difference in attitude to the royal family and information regarding Erik Bloodaxe's family, the latter seems more likely. Through the name Harald Fairhair appears, he is mostly irreverently referred to as Haraldr lúfa. Chapter 3 and 4 tells of Harald's conquest of Norway. It repeats Snorri's story of Harald's vow not to cut his hair until he had become king of all of Norway, but no mention is made of Gyda. Harald is said to have first conquered the Uplands and then taken Trondheim and become overlord over the thronds. This accounts differs from Heimskringla where it is said that Harald made a marriage alliance with Håkon Grjotgardsson which won him Trøndelag after they together defeated the petty kings there. The saga then relates the story of the brothers Herlaug and Hrollaug, kings of Namdalen. When Herlaug heard Harald was coming he committed suicide by closing himself into a mound with 12 men. Hrollaug renounced his kingship and took the title of jarl instead. Harald accepted Hrollaug's surrender and allowed him to rule Namdalen in his name. This story is also present in Heimskringla. After this, Namdalen and Hålogaland were in his grasp. The saga then related how Harald did battle with the combined forces of kings Audbjörn of Firðafylki, Solvi Bandy-legs of Møre og Romsdal and Arnvid of Sunnmøre. They were all defeated in battle by Harald, with only Solvi escaping with his life to live the rest of his life as a roving Viking. The remaining independent rulers of Norway were then crushed by Harald's allies or opportunists that attacked their neighbors and then submitted to Harald like Hrollaug had done. The saga tells how people of Norway were then put under heavy taxes and oppression by Harald. Anyone suspected of wanting to rise in rebellion were given the option of fleeing the country, submitting himself as a tenant or having hands and feet cut off. According to the saga author, most who were given this option chose to flee. Harald is supposed to have confiscated massive amounts of private property and made many previously free farmers his thralls. Four sons of Harald are mentioned in the saga: Eirikr Bloodaxe (one of the saga's major antagonists), Hákon Aðalsteinsfóstri (otherwise called the Good), Olaf and Sigurðr (whose name is otherwise usually rendered as Sigröðr). The saga renders Harald's title as einváldskonungr (absolute king).

=== Grettis saga ===
Not unlike Egil's Saga, Harald's conquest of Norway sets off the plot of Grettis saga. Gretti's great-grandfather Önundr Wood-foot is said to be one of many people that fled Norway after fighting for king Kjotvi the Rich and Thorir Haklang in the battle of Hafrsfjord. The saga describes how Harald and his elite Úlfhèðnar warriors (famously mentioned in Hrafnsmál) fought and killed Thorir Haklang when he went berserk. Önundr got his name after his leg was crushed beneath the knee by the prow of one of the king's ships and he had to walk on a wooden pegleg for the rest of his life.

=== Saga of Ragnar Lodbrok ===
The 13th century Ragnars saga loðbrókar ok sona hans (Saga of Ragnar Lothbrok and his sons) mentions Harald Fairhair in chapter 18 as the great-great-grandson of Sigurd Hart through his daughter Aslaug, her son Sigurd Snake-in-the-Eye and his daughter Ragnhild.

=== Ragnarssona þáttr ===
Harald's maternal ancestry is elaborated upon in the final chapter of the 14th century Ragnarssona þáttr. Harald's mother is said to have been Ragnhild Sigurdsdotter, who according to the saga was the great-granddaughter of Sigurd through her mother Inibjorg and he grandmother Aslaug. This story is the same as in Snorri's earlier Hálfdanar saga svarta in Heimskringla, but contradicts Fagrskinna. Both Hálfdanar saga svarta and Ragnarssona þáttr have issues with the traditional dating of the saga events. The marriage of Sigurd Snake-in-the-Eye and Blaeja could not have occurred earlier than 867, which would put the dating Harald's ascension to kingship of Norway in 872 into question. Fagrskinna makes no mention of Blaeja and states that Ragnhild Sigurdsdotter was Sigurd Snake-in-the-Eye's daughter and not his great-granddaughter, which seems more plausible in regards to the dating of events.

=== Flóamanna saga ===
Flóamanna saga is traditionally thought of as a 14th-century work and repeats the story of Harald Fairhair's ancestry as told in Saga of Ragnar Lodbrok, and elaborates back to Sigurd Fafnisbani and Odin through Aslaug. In old Norse society, the ancestry of both parents was considered of importance for the status of a person. The saga relates the conflict between Atli the Slender and Håkon Grjotgardsson and their deaths. Håkon's son Sigurd Haakonsson advised Harald to kill Atli's son Hallstein which lead to Hallstein's exile in Iceland.

=== Vatnsdæla saga ===
In Vatnsdæla saga Harald's conquest of Norway is described. The saga's initial protagonist Ingimundr recognises that Harald will prevail at Hafrfjord and arranges a meeting with Harald, Ragnvald Mörejarl and their ulfhednar-warriors. Ingimundr offers his loyalty to Harald which Harald graciously accepts, but Ingimundr is suspicious of the king and he and his friend Sæmundr emigrate to Iceland. Harald wins an extrodinary victory at Hafrfjord and makes Ragnvald a jarl.

=== Orkneyinga saga ===
The Orkneyinga saga likely dates to in the early thirteenth century and belongs to belongs to the genre of "Kings' Sagas" within Icelandic saga literature, a group of histories of the kings of Norway. It describes in more detail the expedition of Harald Fairhair and Rognvald Mørejarl on an expedition to clear the islands of the Viking refugees of from Harald's conquest of Norway that raided the coast. During the expedition Rognvald's son Ivar was killed so Harald gave governorship of the islands to him. Rognvald wanted to stay in his home in Møre so he passed the jarlship of the Islands to his brother Sigurd. The saga is informed by the Norwegian politics of the day. Once, historians could write that no-one denied the reality of Harald Fairhair's expeditions to the west (recounted in detail in the Heimskringla), but this is no longer the case. Thomson (2008) writes that Harald's "great voyage is so thoroughly ingrained in popular and scholarly history, both ancient and modern, that it comes as a bit of a shock to realise that it might not be true." The Norwegian contest with the Kings of Scots over the Hebrides and the Isle of Man in the mid 13th century is the backdrop to the saga writer's intentions and in part at least the sagas aim to legitimise Norwegian claims to both the Northern Isles and the Kingdom of the Isles in the west.

=== Flateyjarbók ===
The fourteenth-century Flateyjarbók features a Þáttr called Haralds þáttr hárfagra, literary "Harald Fairhair's Þáttr". The first chapter describes Harald's ascension to the throne at the age of sixteen, in contrast to other accounts which gives the age of ten. He is here given the otherwise unknown nickname "Dofrafostri" (Dovre-fostered). Harald's maternal uncle Guthormr is described as his duke and most important ally. Harald's war with Gandalf Alfgeirsson and his neighboring kings is described as in Heimskringla, through in less detail. Following this Harald's marriage to Gyda is described and his conquest of Norway. Unlike Heimskringla, Flateyjarbók clearly states that the two were married. Harald's further marriages are described as is his rejections of them and his various concubines in favor of Ragnhild the Mighty. The Þáttr concludes with a description of the fates of Harald's various sons, including Thorgils' and Frodi's career as "west-vikings".

=== Later life ===
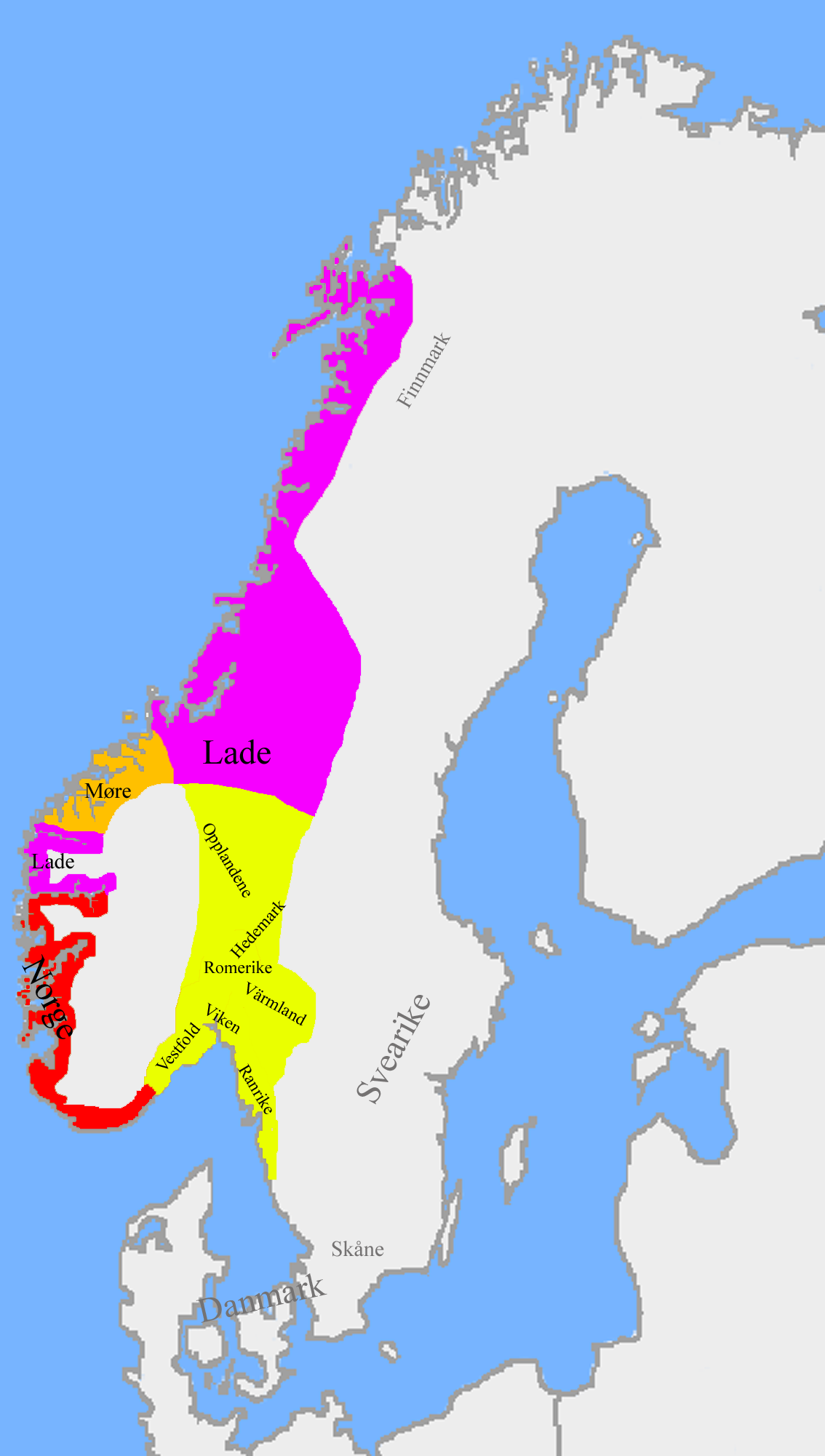
Harald I's division of Norway c. 930 CE. The domain of the High King of Norway. Petty kingdoms assigned to Harald's kinsmen. The domain of the jarls of Hlaðir. The domain of the jarls of Møre. Not shown: the domains of the jarls of Norðreyjar and Suðreyjar.

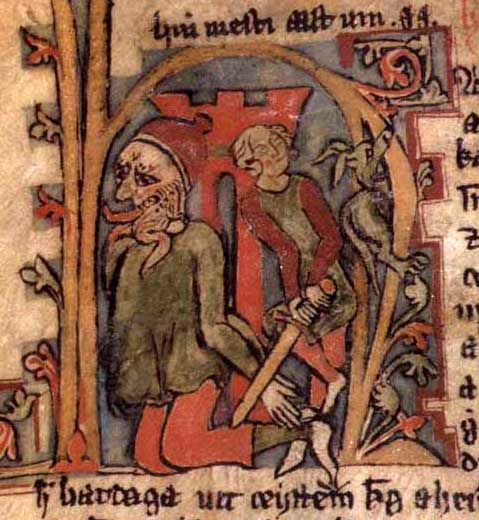
Harald Haarfager later in his life

According to the saga sources, the latter part of Harald's reign was disturbed by the strife of his many sons. The number of sons he left varies in the different saga accounts, from 11 to 20. Twelve of his sons are named as kings, two of them ruled over the whole of Norway. He gave them all the royal title and assigned lands to them, which they were to govern as his representatives; but this arrangement did not put an end to the discord, which continued into the next reign. When he grew old, Harald handed over the supreme power to his favourite son Eirik Bloodaxe, whom he intended to be his successor. Eirik I ruled side by side with his father when Harald was 80 years old. In the Gray Goose Laws, a person above the age of 80 was not allowed to make financial decisions or decisions about inheritance. This co-rulership likely reflected similar laws and would also been way for Harald to force his intended succession. Harald died three years later due to old age in approximately 933.

Harald Harfager was commonly stated to have been buried under a mound at Haugar by the Strait of Karmsund near the present-day Haugesund Church in an area that later would be named the town of Haugesund and Haugesund Municipality. The area near Karmsund was the traditional burial site for several early Norwegian rulers. The national monument of Haraldshaugen was raised in 1872, to commemorate the Battle of Hafrsfjord which is traditionally dated to 872.

== Issue ==
While the various sagas name anywhere from 11 to 20 sons of Harald in various contexts, the contemporary skaldic poem Hákonarmál says that Harald's son Håkon would meet only "eight brothers" when arriving in Valhalla, a place for slain warriors, kings, and Germanic heroes. Only the following five names of sons can be confirmed from skaldic poems (with saga claims in parentheses), while the full number of sons remains unknown:

- Eric Bloodaxe (by Ragnhild Eiriksdotter from Jutland, Denmark)
- Håkon the Good (by Tora Mosterstong from Moster in Sunnhordland, Norway)
- Ragnvald
- Bjørn (Bjørn Farmann?)
- Halvdan, possibly two by that name

=== According to Heimskringla ===
The full list of sons (and partial list of daughters) according to Snorri Sturluson's Heimskringla:

Children with Åsa, daughter of Håkon Grjotgardssson, Jarl av Lade:

- Guttorm Haraldsson, king of Rånrike
- Halvdan Kvite (Haraldsson), king of Trondheim
- Halvdan Svarte Haraldsson, king of Trondheim
- Sigrød Haraldsson, king of Trondheim

Children with Gyda Eiriksdottir:

- Ålov Årbot Haraldsdotter (Rogaland, 875 – Giske, Møre og Romsdal, 935), married Þórir Teiande, "Thore/Tore den Tause" ("the Silent") Ragnvaldsson (c. 862 – Giske, Møre og Romsdal, a. 935), Jarl av Møre, and had issue
- Rørek Haraldsson
- Sigtrygg Haraldsson
- Frode Haraldsson
- Torgils Haraldsson – identified as "Thorgest" in the (dates not correct) Irish history

Children with Svanhild, daughter of Øystein Jarl:

- Bjørn Farmann Haraldssøon, king of Vestfold and reputed great-grandfather of Norwegian king Olaf II.
- Olaf Haraldsson Geirstadalf, king of Vingulmark, later also Vestfold, and reputed father of Tryggve Olafsson, father of Norwegian king Olaf I.
- Ragnar Rykkel Haraldsson

Children with Åshild, daughter of Ring Dagsson:

- Ring Haraldsson
- Dag Haraldsson
- Gudrød Skirja Haraldsdotter
- Ingegjerd Haraldsdotter

Children with Snæfrithr Svásadottir, daughter of Svåse the Finn:

- Halfdan Halegg Haraldsson or "Long-Leg", was executed with the Blood eagle ritual by Torf-Einarr detailed in the Orkneyinga saga and Heimskringla
- Gudröd the Radiant Haraldsson
- Ragnvald Rettilbeine Haraldsson, murdered by Eirik Blodøks on Harald's orders
- Sigurd Rise Haraldsson (great-grandfather to Harald Hardrada)

Other children:

- Ingebjørg Haraldsdotter (Lade, Trondheim, c. 865 – 920), married Halvdan Jarl (c. 865 – 920), Finnmarksjarl, and had issue through an only daughter

== In popular culture ==
=== In Norway ===
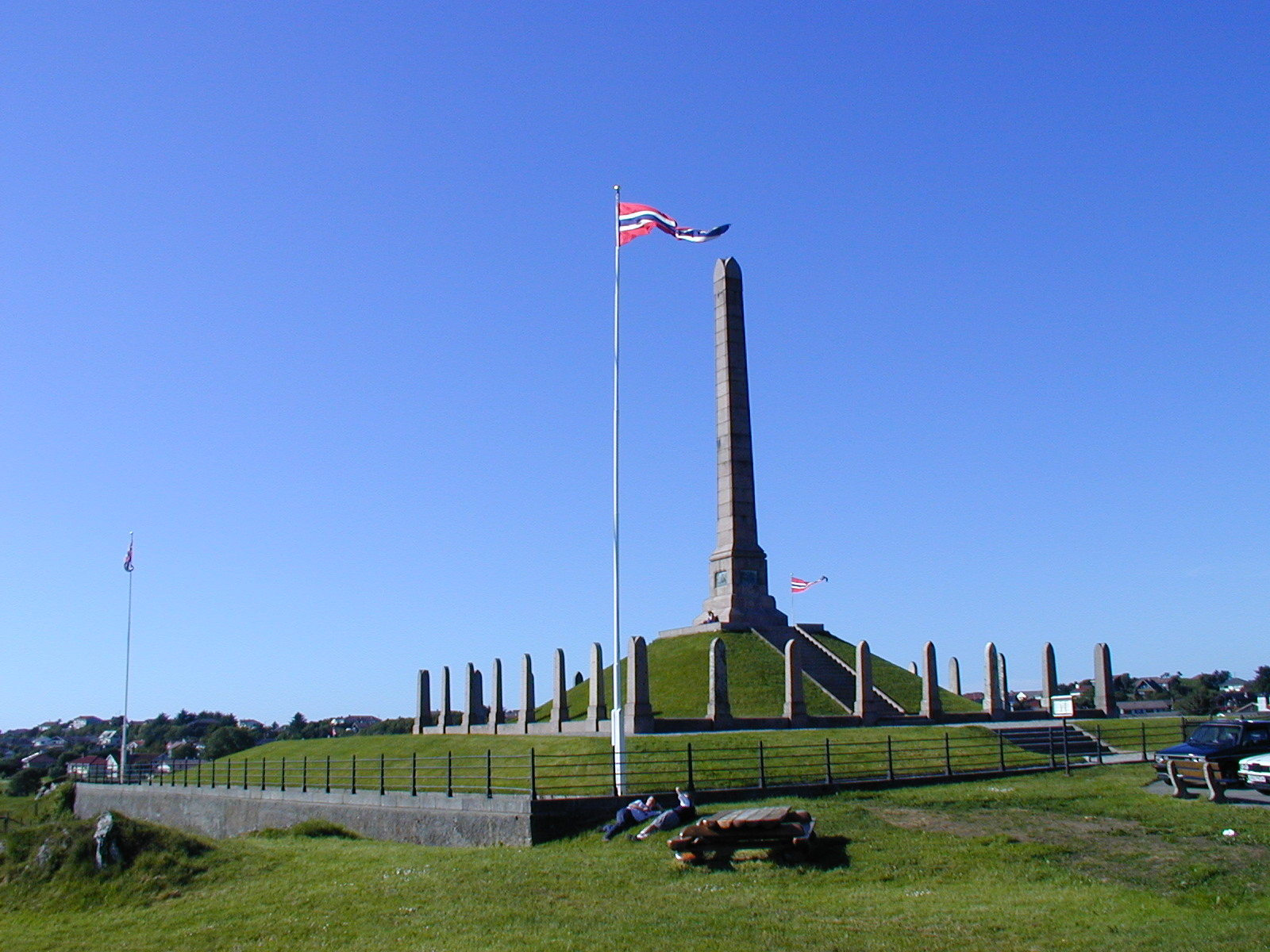
The 1872 monument to Harald at Haraldshaugen.

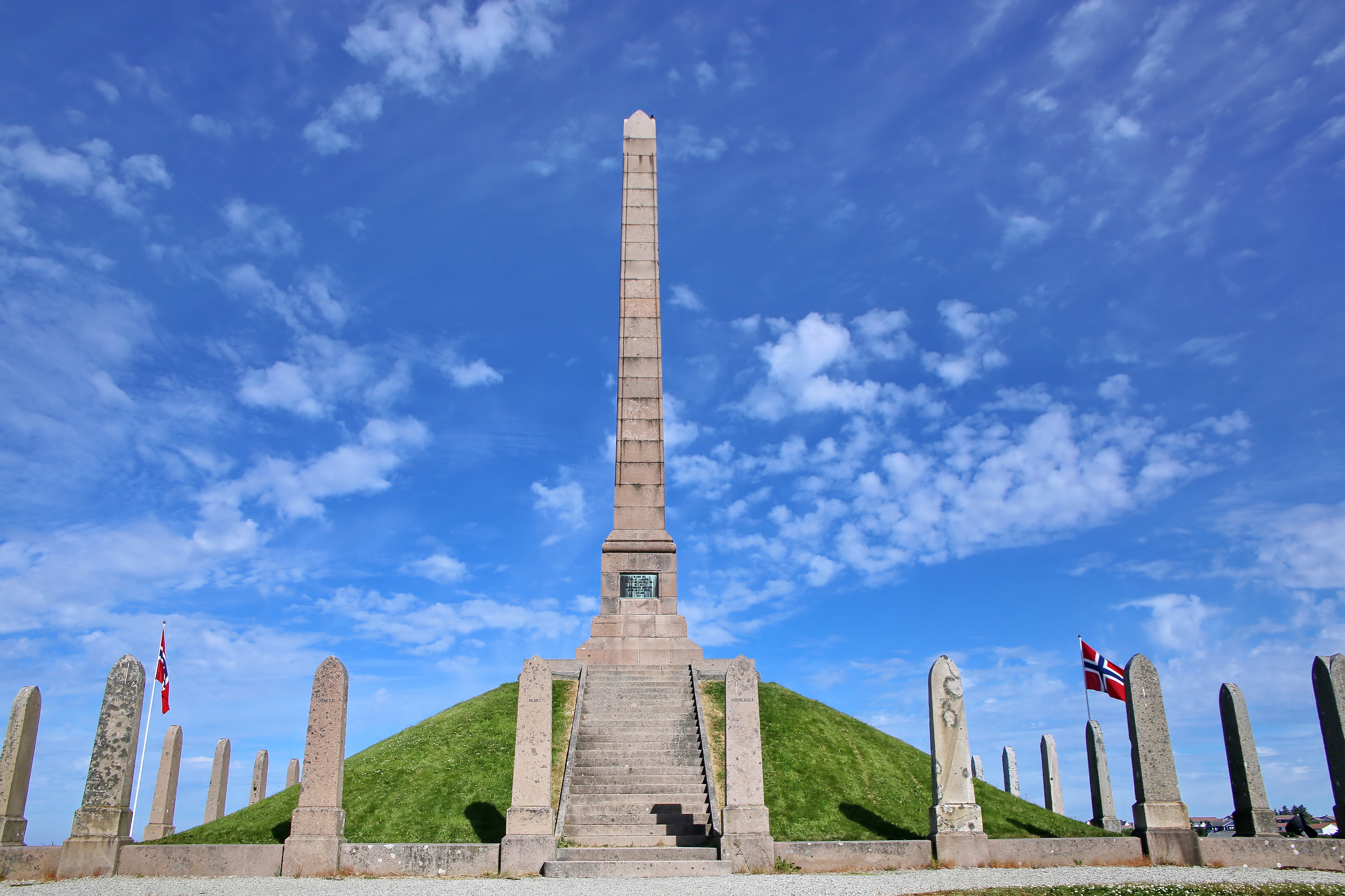
Haraldshaugen Monument (June 2018)

Harald Fairhair became an important figure in Norwegian nationalism in the nineteenth century, during its struggle for independence from Sweden, when he served as 'a heroic narrative character disseminating a foundation story of Norway becoming an independent nation'. In particular, a national monument to Harald was erected in 1872 on Haraldshaugen, an ancient burial mound at the town of Haugesund then imagined to be Harald Finehair's burial place, despite opposition from left-wing politicians. The German historian Jan Rüdiger concluded that:

His compelling narrative has survived scholarly scrutiny almost unscathed - or rather, professional historical knowledge based on a century of source criticism coexists with Snorri's unscathed narrative in the sense that in the 21st century both are "true" in a completary, non-completive way. As unifier of the kingdom, Harald rests under a 'Viking' memorial site of burial mounds and memorial stones near his royal court at Avaldsnes in Vestland, precisely the region that first caught his attention in Gyda, and whose conquest at the Battle of Hafrsfjord has been regarded as the keystone in the unification of the realm ever since Snorri. Harald Fairhair will always be the first king of Norway.

The claim to Harald has become important to the development of the tourism industry of Haugesund and its region:

today, King Harald Fairhair is associated with several archaeological sites where modern monuments and theme parks (obelisks, towers, sculptures, 'reconstructions' of ancient houses/villages) are constructed and where various commemorative practices (jubilees, rallies, festivals) are being performed. The Viking hero Harald Fairhair has become part of a vital re-enactment culture, which is evident in, among other things, a memorial park in central Haugesund with the erection of a statue of Harald Fairhair ... the performance of a Harald musical ... the building of 'the largest' Viking ship in the world ... the establishment of a theme park based on the Viking concept, and a historic centre where the mythology of King Harald is disseminated ... The main initiators behind these commemorative projects in the Haugesund region today are, as it was in the 1870s, local commercial entrepreneurs who are nourished by local patriotism.

In 2013, commercially led archaeological excavations at Avaldsnes began with the explicit intention of developing the local heritage industry in relation to the Harald Fairhair brand, provoking a prominent debate in Norway over the appropriate handling of archaeological heritage.

=== Elsewhere ===
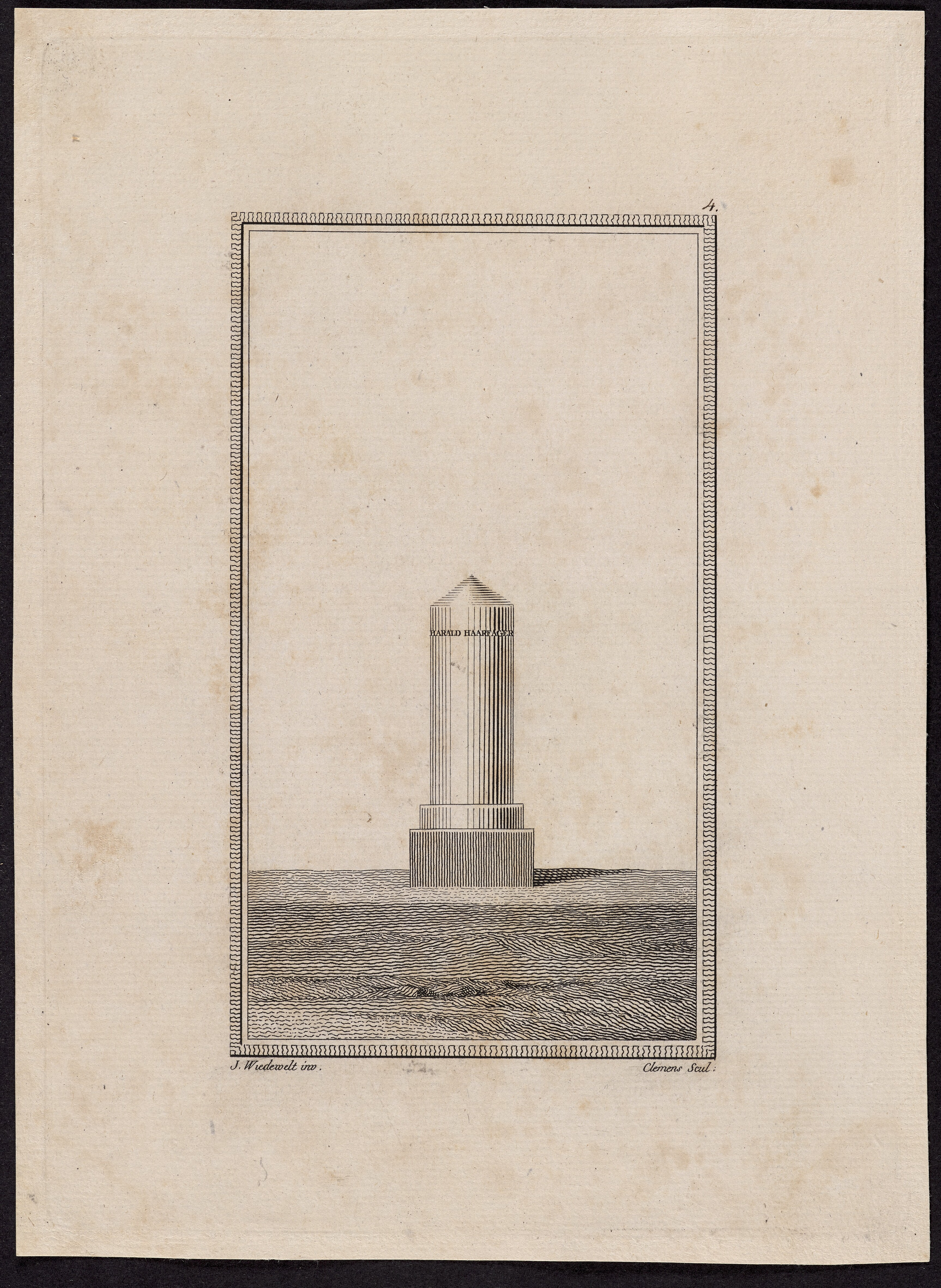
Monument to Harald Fairhair designed by Johannes Wiedewelt in Jægerspris Memorial Parkat Jægerspris Castle, Denmark.

- Fairhair (Viking Kings of Norway #1) — A Viking historical fiction about the boy who set out to be the first king of Norway. Written by Ole Åsli and Tony Bakkejord and published 1 November 2022.
- In the television show Vikings, a character broadly based on Harald (named Harald Finehair in the series) appears in seasons 4–6 (2016–2020) as one of the main protagonists and is portrayed by Finnish actor Peter Franzén.
- In the 1984 film When the Raven Flies, the antagonist Vikings Thordur and Eirikur are refugees from Harald's conquest in Norway. Thordur is particularly paranoid about Harald's retainers following him to Iceland, which the protagonist Gestur uses against him.
- The German power-metal band Rebellion has a song dedicated to Harald Fairhair, from the album Sagas of Iceland.
- Leaves' Eyes, a symphonic metal band from Germany, wrote the album King of Kings about Harald and his conquests.
- In the video games Crusader Kings II and Crusader Kings III, Harald Fairhair is a playable character during the 867 start date.
- Harald Fairhair is mentioned in the manga series Vinland Saga as the tyrannical unifier of Norway.
- Harald appears in Assassin's Creed: Valhalla, a video game by Ubisoft.
- He's briefly mentioned in the 2014 film Northmen: A Viking Saga as the reason why the main characters are fleeing from Norway.
- In the 2010 video-game expansion pack Mount and Blade: Warband's Viking Conquest expansion Harald (as Harald Halfdansson) appears as the faction leader of Northvegr (Norway).
- In the 2022 film The Northman, Fjölnir said to have driven into exile by Harald of Norway. The film is set between in 895, making it a clear allusion to Harald Fairhair.
- In the upcoming TV series Bloodaxe, Fairhair will be played by Jesper Christensen.

== See also ==
- Unification of Norway

Harald Fairhair Fairhair dynasty Born: c. 850 Died: c. 933
Regnal titles
New title	King of Norway; 872–930	Succeeded by Eric I
