= Claus Krag =

Norwegian educator, historian and writer

Claus Krag (born April 21, 1943) is a Norwegian educator, historian, and writer. He is a noted specialist in Old Norse philology and medieval Norwegian history. Krag earned his Cand.philol. in 1969. He is professor of history at Telemark University College.

== Selected works ==
- Motstandsbestemmelsene i Frostatingsloven (1969)
- Artikler i utvalg for historiestudiet : Roma og middelalder (1975)
- By og imperium : Romas historie fra republikk til keiserdømme : tekst, kilder og oppgaver (1977)
- Introduksjon til bosetningshistorien (1980)
- Oldtidens historie ca. 700 f.Kr. - 600 e.Kr. Første del : Hellas (1983)
- Skikkethet og arv i tronfølgeloven av 1163 (1983)
- Perspektiv på tidlig middelalder (1983)
- Europa i middelalderen : hovedlinjer i den politiske utvikling ca. 500-1300 (1985)
- Ynglingatal og Ynglingesaga- en studie i historiske kilder (1991)
- Vikingtid og rikssamling 800-1130 (Aschehoug's History of Norway, 2) (Oslo, 1995)
- Kirkens forkynnelse i tidlig middelalder og nordmennenes kristendom (1995)
- Norges historie fram til 1319 (Oslo, 2000)
- Sverre: Norges største middelalderkonge (2003)
