= Álof árbót Haraldsdóttir =

Norwegian princess

Álof árbót Haraldsdottir
- Spouse: Thórir þegjandi
- Issue: Bergljot Thorisdottir
- House: Møre
- Father: Harald Fairhair
- Mother: Gyða Eiriksdottir

Álof árbót (‘Improvement of Prosperity’) Haraldsdottir was a daughter of King Harald Fairhair and member of the ninth-century ruling family of Møre.

According to Snorri Sturluson's Heimskringla, Álof was the first child of Harald Fairhair and Gyða Eiriksdottir. She was given in marriage to Thórir þegjandi (‘the Silent’) of Møre after two of Harald’s sons killed Thórir’s father Rǫgnvaldr. They had a daughter, Bergljót.

Orkneyinga saga also includes this episode, specifying that Álof was given to Thórir i fǫðurbœtr (in compensation for his father’s death).

Álof is mentioned as the daughter of Harald, wife of Thórir, and mother of Bergljót in Ágrip and in Landnámabók. Bergljót married Sigurðr Hákonsson, Jarl of Lade and was mother of Hákon Sigurðsson.

Snorri's other work, the Separate Óláfs saga helga, gives Álof's mother as Álfhild, daughter of Hringr Dagsson, instead of Gyða.

Her nickname, árbót, has been translated as ‘Improvement of Prosperity,’ ‘Season’s Blessing,’ and ‘Who-Makes-the-Harvests-Better.’ Jan Rüdiger notes, "the compound...is reminiscent of the agrarian aspect of sacred kinship (the set phrase ár ok fríðr '[good harvest] year and peace' sums up ‘good’ kingship), in which the princess—or the hypothetical narrative figure who became Harald and Gyða’s daughter during the textualizations of the saga—had a share."
