= Eystein Glumra =

Norwegian petty king

- Born: c. 810; Norway
- Died: c. 870; Norway
- Other name: "Eystein the Noisy" or "Eystein the Clatterer"
- Children: Rognvald Eysteinsson; Sigurd Eysteinsson; Svanhild Eysteinsdottir
- Father: Ivar Halfdansson

Eystein Glumra ("Eystein the Noisy" or "Eystein the Clatterer"; Modern Norwegian Øystein Glumra), also known as Eystein Ivarsson, was reputedly a petty king on the west coast of Norway during the 9th century.

The Heimskringla saga states that Eystein Glumra was the father of Rognvald Eysteinsson and Sigurd Eysteinsson: "The first earl of the Orkney Islands was ... Sigurd ... a son of Eystein Glumra, and brother of Ragnvald earl of More. After Sigurd, his son Guthorm was earl for one year. After him Torf-Einar, a son of Ragnvald ... was long earl, and was a man of great power".

According to the Orkneyinga saga, Eystein Glumra was the son of Ivar Halfdansson and grandson of Halfdan the Old. The Orkneyinga Saga also named Eystein Glumra as the father of Rognvald Eysteinsson: "Heiti, Gorr's son, was father of Sveiði the sea-king, [who was] the father of Halfdan the old, [who was] the father of Ivar the Uplanders' earl, [who was] the father of Eystein the noisy, [who was] the father of earl Rognvald the mighty and wise in council".

Two novels by Linnea Hartsuyker, The Half-Drowned King (2017) and The Sea Queen (2018), cover the lives of Eystein's children.
