= Rognvald Eysteinsson =

9th-century Norse viking and first Jarl of Møre

- Jarl (Earl) of Møre
- Reigned: mid-9th century
- Predecessor: None (founder)
- Successor: Thorir Rögnvaldarson
- Native name: Rögnvaldr "The Wise"
- Born: Norway
- Died: c. 890
- Noble family: Jarls of Møre
- Spouse: Hildr Hrólfsdóttir
- Issue: Hallad, Torf-Einarr, Hrollaugr, Ivar, Hrólfr (possibly Rollo), Thorir Rögnvaldarson
- Father: Eystein Ivarsson

Rognvald Eysteinsson (fl. 865) was the founding Jarl (or Earl) of Møre in Norway, and a close relative and ally of Harald Fairhair, the earliest known King of Norway. In the Norse language he is known as Rǫgnvaldr Eysteinsson (Mǿrajarl) and in modern Norwegian as Ragnvald Mørejarl. He is sometimes referred to with bynames that may be translated into modern English as "Rognvald the Wise" or "Rognvald the Powerful".

The earliest available sources regarding Rognvald are mutually contradictory and were compiled long after he died. The best known are the Norse Sagas, although modern scholars highlight many inconsistencies and improbable claims regarding Rognvald in the sagas, and believe that they must be treated with caution: The texts of the sagas were compiled three centuries after the events described and their accuracy in regard to Rognvald's life and historical significance is now questioned. Hence some scholars instead emphasise other accounts, closer to the historical period in question, such as Irish and Scottish sources.

While Rognvald does appear to have had some kind of role in the founding of the Norse Earldom of Orkney, most historians now doubt claims in the Sagas that Rognvald led one particular "great voyage" – a Norwegian expedition that attacked rebel vikings, who had been raiding Norway from bases on Orkney and Shetland, before raiding the Scottish mainland, Ireland and the Isle of Man. It is now generally believed that any such expedition would have occurred after Rognvald's lifetime. A modern authority on Orcadian history, William P. L. Thomson, comments that the story of the "great voyage is so thoroughly ingrained in popular and scholarly history, both ancient and modern, that it comes as a bit of a shock to realise that it might not be true."

Modern scholars also highlight inconsistencies and improbable claims in the sagas' claims regarding: the relationship between Rognvald and Harald; the names and biographies of Rognvald's immediate family; and, the founding of the earldom of Møre.

Rognvald was the father of Torf-Einarr (d. circa 910) an earl of Orkney. Some Norse accounts claimed that another son, Hrólfr, settled in France and, under the name Rollo (d. 930), founded the Duchy of Normandy. However, French sources suggest that Rollo's father was an unnamed Danish or Norwegian nobleman, or a viking named Ketill.

== Traditional accounts ==
=== Sources ===
The oldest account that may refer to Rognvald and the Earldom of Orkney appears to be the Fragmentary Annals of Ireland. These annals are believed to date from the lifetime of Donnchad mac Gilla Pátraic, who died in 1039, although they survive only as incomplete copies made by Dubhaltach Mac Fhirbhisigh (17th century).

...for it was not long before this that there had been every war and every trouble in Norway, and this was the source of that war in Norway: two younger sons of Albdan, king of Norway, drove out the eldest son, i.e. Ragnall son of Albdan, for fear that he would seize the kingship of Norway after their father. So Ragnall came with his three sons to the Orkney Islands. Ragnall stayed there then, with his youngest son.
Fragmentary Annals of Ireland, FA 330. Edited and translated by Joan N. Radnor.

These events are placed after an account of the devastation of Fortriu, dated to around 866, and the mention of an eclipse confirms a date of 865.

Dating the Orkneyinga saga has proven to be controversial but a recent analysis has the "majority of scholars in favour of dates between 1170 and 1220" whilst admitting that "it remains to be established when, why, where, for whom and by whom it was written". Much of the information it contains is "hard to corroborate".

Rognvald is also referred to in Snorri Sturluson's Heimskringla (written c. 1230), written in Iceland.

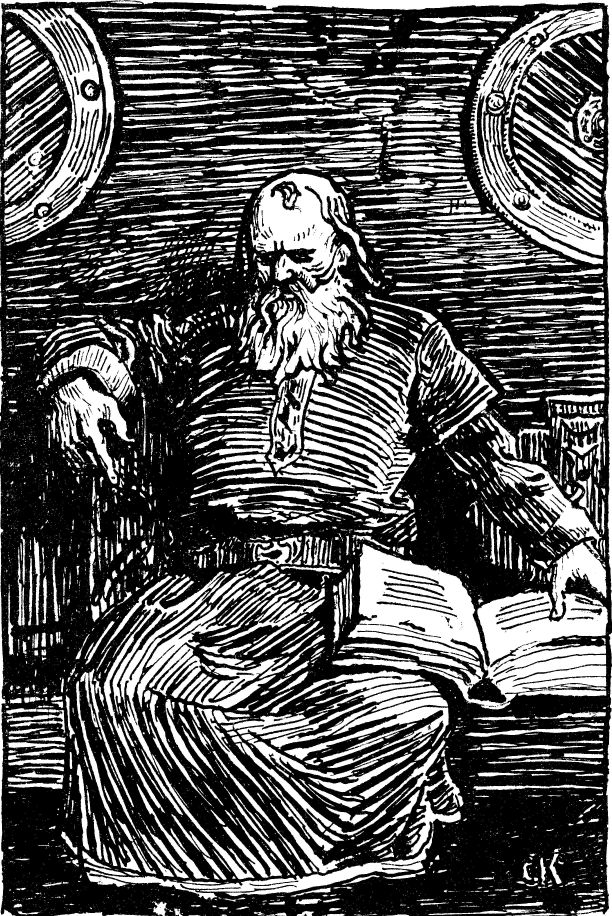
Christian Krohg's portrait of Snorri Sturluson, 13th century compiler of the Heimskringla.

While the Historia Norvegiae (written c. 1505) includes an account of the foundation of the Orkney earldom, as well as some questionable details about pre-Viking Orkney, it has relatively little to say about Rognvald.

=== Family ===
It is not certain that the Ragnall of the Irish annals is synonymous with Rognvald Eysteinsson. The relevant entry goes on to describe Ragnall's older sons raiding in Spain and North Africa, but there is no specific mention of the Earldom of Orkney. There is also a separate piece of circumstantial evidence, suggesting a link between Ragnall and the 9th century figure Ragnar Lodbrok: runic inscriptions found inside Maeshowe, dating from the 12th century, state that the mound was "built before Loðbrók".

There is no agreement in the available sources on Rognvald's parentage. According to the Irish annals, Ragnall was the son of "Halfdan, King of Lochlann". This is generally understood to mean Halfdan the Black, which would make Ragnall the brother of King Harald Fairhair. This is contradicted by later Norse sagas, which suggest that Halfdan was Rognvald's grandfather. The Orkneyinga saga says that Rognvald was the son of Eystein Ivarsson and grandson of Ívarr Upplendingajarl.

He was married, according to the Orkneyinga saga to Ragnhild, the daughter of a man named Hrólfr Nose, although in the Heimskringla his wife is named Hild.

Both sagas refer to six sons. The oldest, "by concubines", were Hallad, Einarr and Hrollaug, who were "grown men when their brothers born in marriage were still children". The latter were Ivar, Hrólfr, and Thorir the Silent. Hrólfr, who "was so big that no horse could carry him", hence his byname of "Ganger-Hrólf", (which means "by foot") is identified by the saga writers with Rollo, founder of the Duchy of Normandy (in 911).

In the Orkneyinga saga Rognvald was made the Earl of Møre by Harald Fairhair. The Saga of Harald Fairhair in Heimskringla recounts that Rognvald caused Harald Fairhair to be given his byname by cutting and dressing his hair, which had been uncut for ten years on account of his vow never to cut it until he was ruler of all Norway. Rognvald accompanied the king on a great military expedition. First the islands of Shetland and Orkney were cleared of Vikings who had been raiding Norway and then continued on to Scotland, Ireland and the Isle of Man. During this campaign Rognvald's son Ivarr was killed and in compensation Harald granted Rognvald Orkney and Shetland.

Rognvald thereafter returned to Norway, giving the northern isles to his brother Sigurd Eysteinsson. Sigurd had been the forecastleman on Harald's ship and after sailing back east the king "gave Sigurd the title of earl". However, the Heimskringla states specifically that Sigurd was the first Earl of Orkney. According to the Orkneyinga Saga, after Sigurd became earl he died in a curious fashion, following a battle with Máel Brigte of Moray. Sigurd's son Gurthorm ruled for a single winter after this and died childless. Rognvald's son Hallad then inherited the title. However, unable to constrain Danish raids on Orkney, he gave up the earldom and returned to Norway, which "everyone thought was a huge joke." Still, there is a tradition among the folk at Strath Halladale, Sutherland, which is named for Hallad, that he returned and was slain in battle at the beginning of the tenth century and was buried near the battle site in a circular trench ten or twelve feet wide. His sword, it is said, was placed beside him in the grave, and a stone was placed in the center of the circle, part of which was still visible at the beginning of the eighteenth century. The site was near a little town called Dal Halladha, Halladha's field.

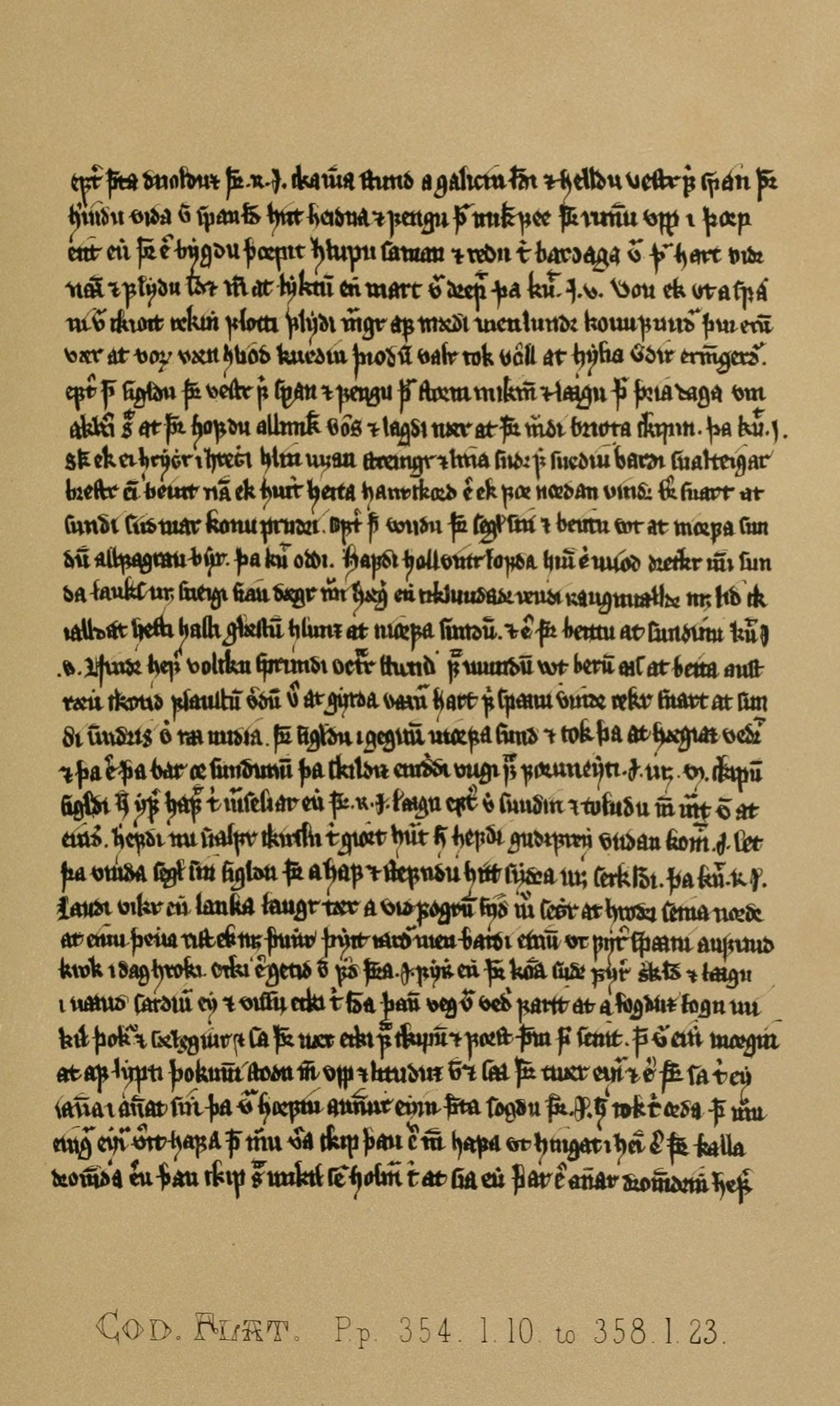
A page from the Orkneyinga saga, as it appears in the 14th century Flateyjarbók.

The Danish raids caused Rognvald to fly into a rage and summon his sons Thorir and Hrolluag. He predicted that Thorir's path would keep him in Norway and that Hrolluag was destined seek his fortune in Iceland. Turf-Einar, the youngest, then came forward and offered to go to the islands. Rognvald said: "Considering the kind of mother you have, slave-born on each side of her family, you are not likely to make much of a ruler. But I agree, the sooner you leave and the later you return the happier I'll be." His father's misgivings notwithstanding, Torf-Einarr succeeded in defeating the Danes and founded a dynasty which retained control of the islands for centuries after his death.

Historia Norvegiae includes some questionable details about pre-Viking Orkney – such as an account of the Picts as a small people who hid in the daytime – as well as the foundation of the Orkney earldom,.

In the days of Harald Fairhair, king of Norway, certain pirates, of the family of the most vigorous prince Ronald [Rognvald], set out with a great fleet, and crossed the Solundic sea..., and subdued the islands to themselves. And being there provided with safe winter seats, they went in summer-time working tyranny upon the English, and the Scots, and sometimes also upon the Irish, so that they took under their rule, from England, Northumbria; from Scotland, Caithness; from Ireland, Dublin, and the other sea-side towns.

This account does not specifically associate Rognvald with the earldom, attributing the "dominion" of the islands to the anonymous kinfolk of his son Hrólfr.

=== Death and legacy ===
Rognvald was killed by King Harald's son Halfdan Hålegg and Gudrod Gleam, who engineered a sudden attack, surrounding the house in which Rognvald was staying, and burned it to the ground with the earl and 60 of his men inside it. Harald "flew into a rage" when he heard about this and sent out a "great force" against Gudrod who was then banished. Halfdan escaped into the western seas and Rognvald's death was later avenged by Torf-Einarr, who killed him on North Ronaldsay and then made peace with Harald. Rognvald's son Thorir was then made Earl of Møre by Harald, who also gave Thorir his daughter Alof in marriage.

The sagas thus identify Rognvald as the apical figure of the Norse Earls of Orkney who controlled the islands until the early 13th century, and a forerunner of important Icelandic families. Furthermore, through his son Hrolfr, Rognvald is portrayed as an ancestor of the Dukes of Normandy who, following the Norman conquest of England in 1066, became the kings of England.

== Modern interpretations ==
=== Harald Fairhair and the voyage to the west ===
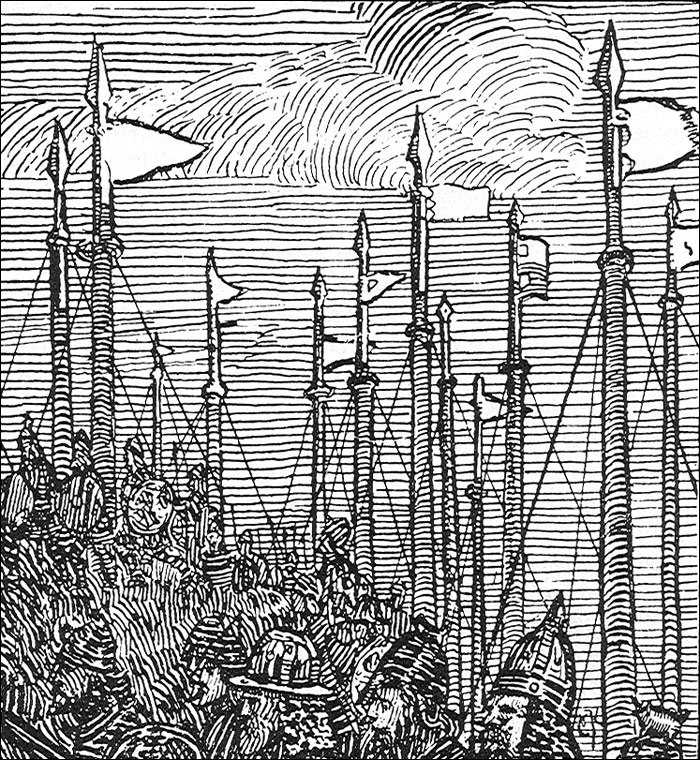
Magnus Barefoot's army in Ireland. Magnus' actions in the west clearly form the basis of the saga narrative about the submission of Orkney and Shetland to Harald Fairhair's fleet.

Rognvald's life occurs within the first eight short chapters within the Orkneyinga saga and it is clear that in this early period it contains generally less detail and historical accuracy than in the later events it describes. Recorded in the 13th century, the sagas are informed by Norwegian politics of the day.

Harald Fairhair's supposed expeditions to the west, recounted by Snorri Sturluson in Heimskringla are no longer accepted as historical realities by many modern historians, including Thomson. Later (mid-13th century) rivalry between the Norwegians and the Kings of the Scots over the Hebrides and the Isle of Man are seen to have driven Sturluson's account. At least in part, the sagas aim to legitimise Norwegian claims to both the Northern Isles and the Kingdom of the Isles in the west. The situation faced by Earl Harald Maddadsson of Orkney in 1195, when he was forced to submit himself to royal authority after an ill-judged intervention in Norwegian affairs, would have made legendary material of this nature of considerable interest in Orkney, at the time that the sagas were written.

It is also clear that elements in the narrative are drawn from the much later expeditions undertaken by Magnus Barefoot. Nonetheless, the view that the Orkney earldom was created by "members of the Møre family" continues to receive academic support. (Note: In an early reference to the Norse presence in the Irish records it is stated that there was a king of "Viking Scotland" whose heir, Tomrair or Thórir, brought an army to Ireland in 848 by which date the Norsemen were probably fully in possession of the Northern and Western Isles. However there is no evidence of any link between this military leader and Rognvald’s son of the same name.)

Harald Fairhair's victory in the Battle of Hafrsfjord, which gave him dominion over parts of Norway, is traditionally dated to 872, but was probably later, perhaps as late as 900. What little is known of Scottish events in the period from the Chronicle of the Kings of Alba would correspond equally well with Harald's attacks on Scotland in the reign of Domnall mac Causantín (ruled 889–900). However, this would not correspond with the sequence in the earliest account of the origins of the Orkney earldom, which places this a generation earlier. The entry in the Fragmentary Annals at an early date also makes it difficult to reconcile the saga claims that Harald Fairhair was involved in Rognvald's conquest of the northern isles.

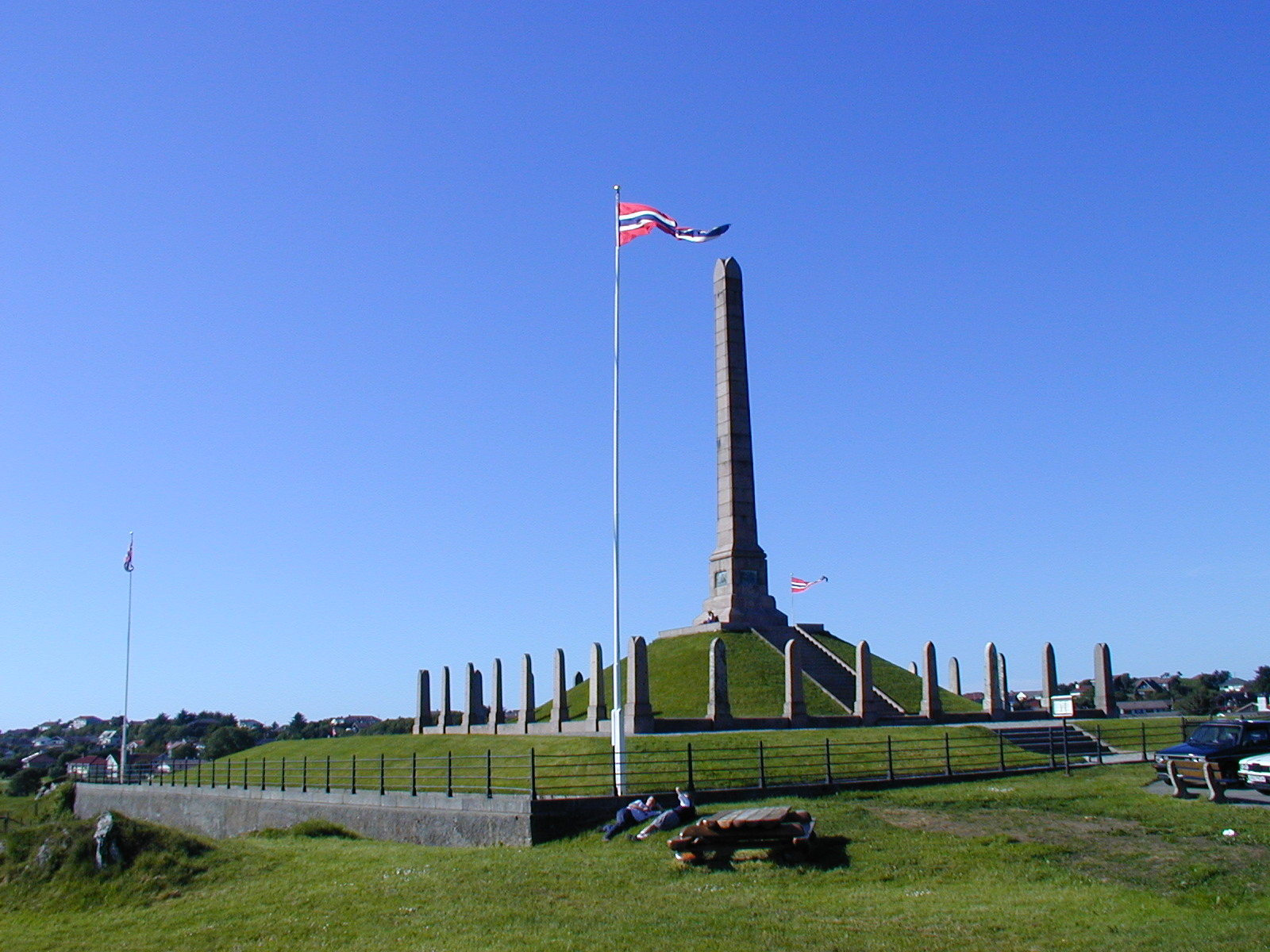
The monument at Haraldshaugen, erected to celebrate the millennial anniversary of Norway's unification under the rule of King Harald Fairhair after the Battle of Hafrsfjord.

Other saga material provides an alternative description. In the Eyrbyggja saga the same story of a great expedition to punish unruly Vikings who were raiding Norway is undertaken, but here it is Ketil flatnefr (Ketil Flatnose) who leads it. Although this is apparently done at Harald's behest, Ketil then claims the islands as his own. Once again, the chronology is flawed by Harald's inclusion in the tale as other information provided about Ketil gives him a floruit of the mid, rather than late, 9th century.

Furthermore, contemporary Irish sources have a great deal to say about Viking raids on the coasts of Ireland and southern Scotland and those who led them, but none mention King Harald. The earliest of the large expeditions again belong to a period—the 840s—that pre-dates the time of Harald's kingship.

Smyth (1984) credits the launching of the great voyage to the west to Olaf the White, whom he provides with a royal Vestfold origin along with various military activities in Scotland and for whom, assuming an identification of Olaf with Amlaib "Conung" the King of Dublin, there is a contemporary Irish reference dating to 853. Icelandic sources also have Olaf marrying Aud the Deep-Minded, Ketil flatnefr's daughter, and the ‘’Annals of Ulster’’ record what may be dynastic in-fighting between Olaf and his father-in-law in 857. (Note: More controversially, Smyth also identifies Olaf the White with Olaf Geirstad-Alf, a legendary Norwegian king of the House of Yngling – a suggestion dismissed by Ó Corráin (1979).)

=== Founding of the earldom of Orkney ===
By implication the Orkneyinga saga identifies Rognvald as the founder of the earldom, although Heimskringla has his brother Sigurd as the first to formally hold the title. Other sources are less specific (see above) and the sagas have been interpreted in various other ways. Smyth (1984), having banished King Harald’s role in the voyage to the west to the realms of myth concludes that the role of the brothers Eysteinsson can be similarly so dispatched and that Torf-Einarr “may be regarded as the first historical earl of Orkney”.

Drawing on Adam of Bremen's assertion that Orkney was not conquered until the time of Harald Hardrada, who ruled Norway from 1043 to 1066, Woolf (2007) speculates that Sigurd “the Stout” Hlodvirsson, Torf-Einarr's great-grandson, may have been the first Earl of Orkney

=== Rognvald's brother and sons ===
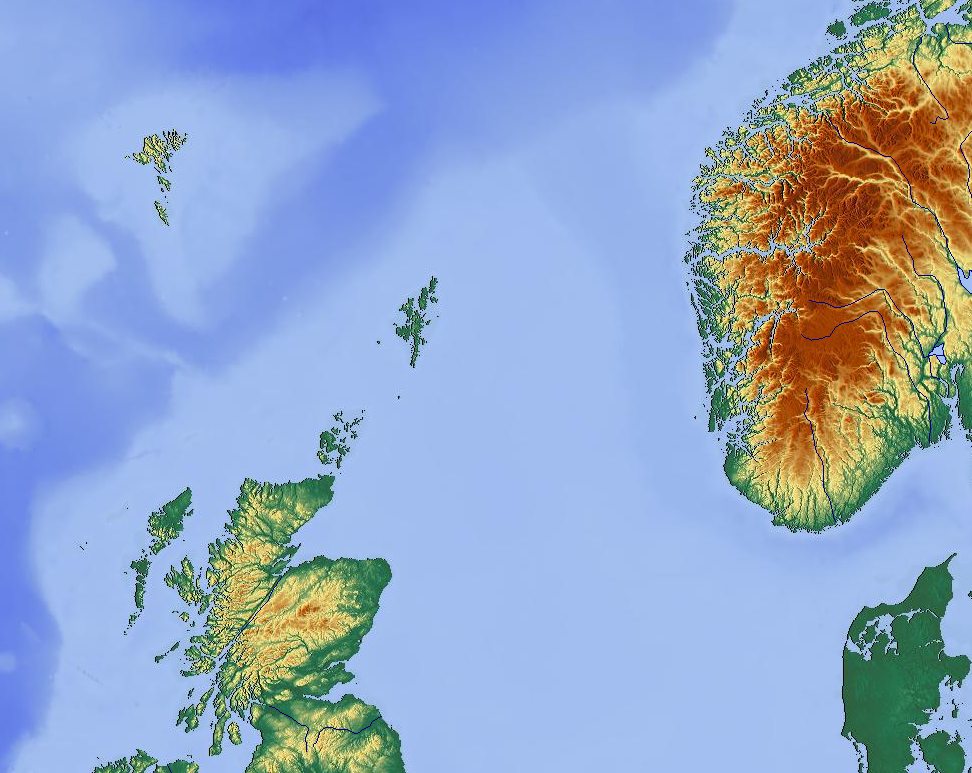
Orkney and Shetland at centre, in relation to nearby territories

The notion that Rognvald could hand over his Northern Isles estates to his brother has been interpreted in various ways. For example, it may be that he was aware of ongoing Viking raiding in the area and considered the gift from the king as a mixed blessing. This is also one of a number of instances in which the writer of the Orkneyinga saga attempts to reconcile the conflicting themes of independence from Norway (Rognvald gifts the islands to Sigurd) and dependence on royal authority (Harald formalises the process by confirming Sigurd as earl). Beuermann (2011) speculates that Rognvald's transfer of power to his brother may have been an attempt by the saga writers to imply that the Orkney earldom had more independence from Norway than that of Møre and that Rognvald's holdings in Caithness may have allowed for an even greater degree of freedom of action. Such implications are more likely to be rooted in the writer's interest in emphasising Orcadian independence at the time of writing rather than the 9th/10th century events they purport to describe.

After Hallad's failure in Orkney there is a dialogue between father and sons that has been interpreted as being about Rognvald's desire to cement his own position as Earl of Møre and an allusion to the early history of Iceland, where the sagas were written. Thorir is a compliant son who Rognvald is happy to keep at home. Hrollaug is portrayed as a man of peace who will go to Iceland. Einarr is aggressive and a threat to his father's position so can be spared for the dangers of Orkney. In the Landnámabók version the equally aggressive Hrolfr is also present, and his destiny is anticipated to be in conveniently far-away Normandy. (Note: In the Heimskringla Hrolfr is banished by King Harald.)

=== Similarities to Ragnall ua Ímair ===
Alex Woolf suggests that saga authors may have synthesised elements of the life of Ragnall ua Ímair, a later figure, into the figure of Rognvald Eysteinsson of Møre. Ragnall ua Ímair, who was active between 914 and 921 in the Irish Sea region, was a grandson of Ímar, the "king of the Northmen of all Britain and Ireland", whose death is recorded in the Annals of Ulster in 873.

There are at least two major similarities between the two figures include: both are grandsons of an Ímar/Ivarr and; like Rognvald, a close relative of Ragnall named Ímar was killed in battle in Scotland (Ímar ua Ímair, d. 904).

=== Broad themes ===
There are several recurring themes in the Orkneyinga saga, including strife between brothers, relationships between the jarls and the Norwegian crown, and raiding in the Hebrides, all of which are touched on during the saga's coverage of Rognvald's life and times. In part, the saga's purpose was to "explore such social and psychological tensions as these in the history of the people of Orkney, and to help them understand themselves through a knowledge of their origins".
