= Ivar Halfdansson =

Norse semi-legendary figure

Ivar Halfdansson (also known as Ivarr Upplendingajarl) is a semi-legendary figure mentioned in medieval Norse sources, particularly in the Hversu Noregr byggðist ("How Norway Was Settled"), an appendix to the Flateyjarbók. He is described as:

- A petty king or jarl (earl) from the Oppland region in Norway.
- The son of Halfdan the Old, a figure often viewed as an ancestral patriarch in Norse genealogy.
- Most notably, Ivar is considered an ancestor of Harald Fairhair, the first king to unite Norway.

Due to the mythical and genealogical nature of the sources, much of what is known about Ivar Halfdansson is legendary rather than historical. He is part of the extended family tree connecting Norse and Scandinavian noble lineages to semi-divine or heroic origins. According to Orkneyinga saga, he was the son of Halfdan Sveidasson and the father of Eystein Glumra and Sigurd Ivarsson. Beyond these genealogical accounts, there is little concrete evidence about his life or deeds.

Traditional sources state that he was the father of Eystein Glumra and, according to the Orkneyinga Saga, an ancestor of both the Earls of Orkney and Rollo of Normandy.
