= Earls of Møre =

Dynasty of noblemen in Norway

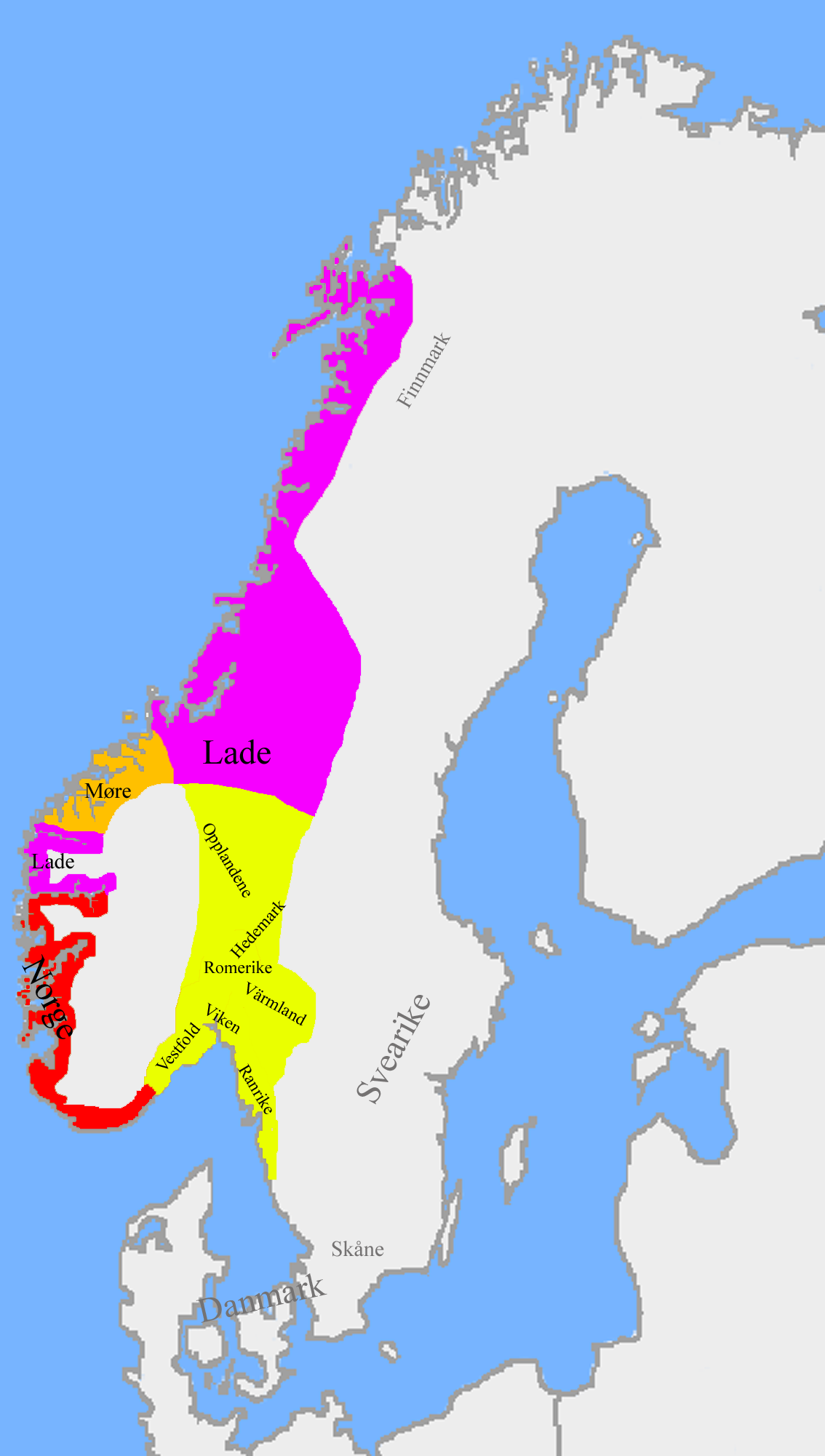
Division of Norway ca. 930 AD. The orange area is the domain the earls of Møre.

The Earls of Møre (Old Norse: Jarlar á Mœri) were a dynasty of powerful noblemen in Norway dating to the unification of Norway in the 9th century. The first earl of Møre was Rognvald Eysteinsson, a close friend and ally of King Harald I of Norway. He is called by the byname Rognvald Mørejarl (Rǫgnvaldr Mœrajarl) in the Heimskringla and Orkneyinga saga.

During the early Viking Age, Norway consisted of a number of petty kingdoms. King Harald I was able to unite them all after winning the Battle of Hafrsfjord in 872. Subsequently, King Harald I granted land to his sons and other earls who swore fealty to him. The land and estates of the earls of Møre were primary located in modern-day Sunnmøre and Nordmøre in the county of Møre og Romsdal, in the northernmost part of Western Norway.

The earls of Møre and the Norse earls of Orkney were very closely related. The first sitting earl of Orkney was Sigurd Eysteinsson, brother of Rognvald Mørejarl. After several relations held reigns of less than two years, Torf-Einarr, the youngest of the illegitimate sons of Rognvald Mørejarl, became the fourth earl of Orkney and established the bloodline from which the earls of Orkney would directly descend until 1231.

== Dynasty ==
1. Rognvald Eysteinsson, reigned mid-9th century to his death in c. 892
2. Thorir Rögnvaldarson, reigned c. 892 – c. 935
