= Thorir Rögnvaldarson =

Norwegian Viking and jarl of the 9th century

- Thorir the Silent

Jarl of Møre
- Reigned: c. 892–c. 940
- Predecessor: Rǫgnvaldr Eysteinsson
- Native name: Þórir Rǫgnvaldsson (Old Norse); Tore Ragnvaldsson (Norwegian)
- Born: c. 862
- Died: c. 934
- Noble family: Jarls of Møre
- Spouse: Ólǫf árbót Haraldsdóttir
- Issue: Bergljót Þórisdóttir; Vigdís Þórisdóttir; Jǫrundur háls Þórisson; Thorbard av Møre
- Father: Rǫgnvaldr Eysteinsson
- Mother: Hildr Hrólfsdóttir

Thórir 'the Silent' Rǫgnvaldsson (Old Norse: Þórir þegjandi Rǫgnvaldsson; Norwegian: Tore Teiande Ragnvaldsson; c. 862 – c. 934) was a ninth-century Viking and the second Jarl of Møre.

== Family background ==
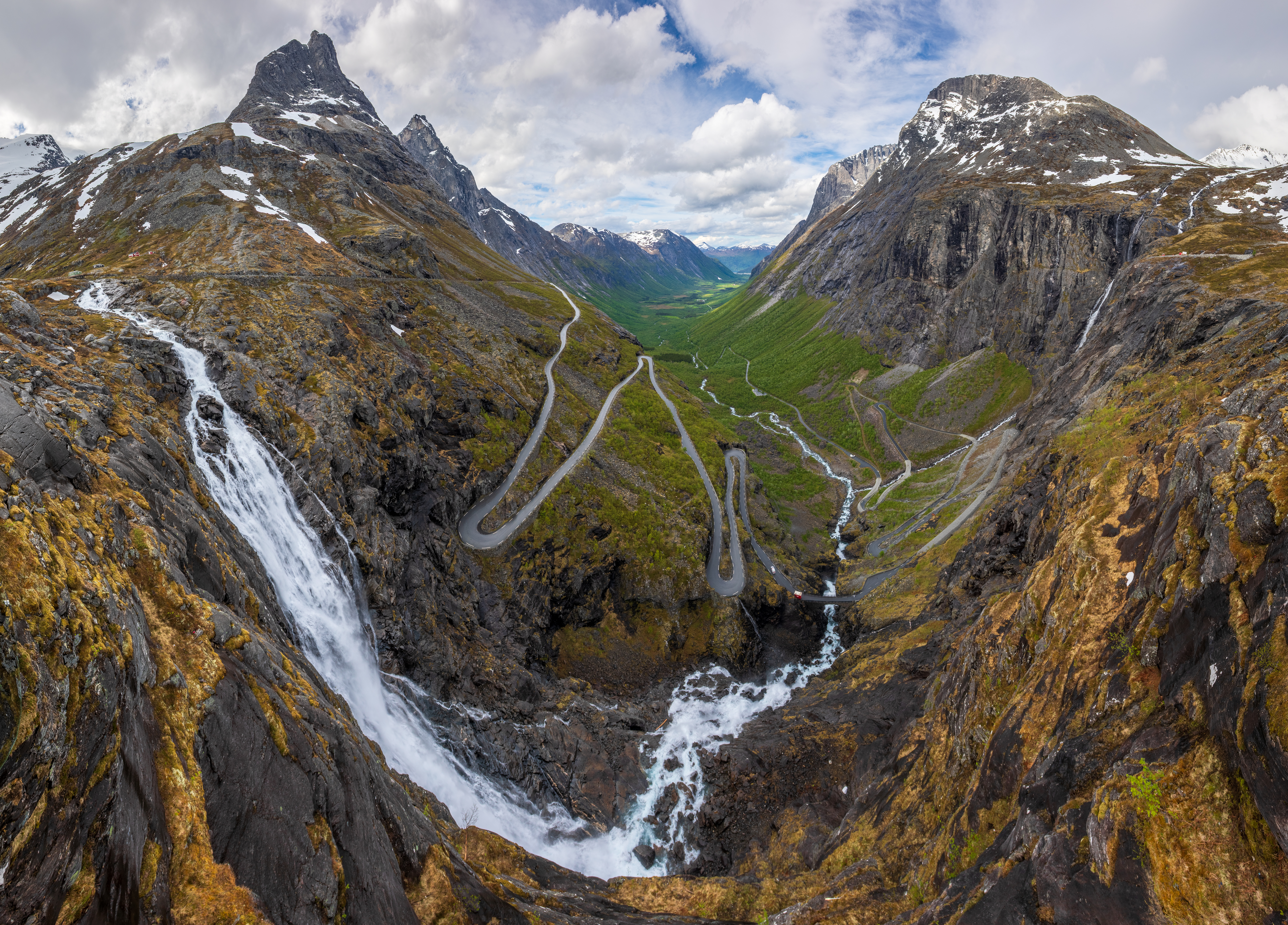
A recent picture of the Møre region of Norway

Thórir was the son of Rǫgnvaldr Eysteinsson, first jarl of Møre (Mœrajarl) and close friend of King Harald Fairhair, and Hildr Hrólfsdóttir, a jarl's daughter and skald in her own right. He was one of three sons born to Rǫgnvaldr and Hildr, along with Ívarr (died c. 872) and Hrólfr (c. 860–c. 932). Through his father, he had three half-brothers, called Hallað, Einarr, and Hrollaugr.

Ívarr accompanied their father on campaign in support of King Harald Fairhair and was slain in battle in the early 870s. The king granted the jarldom of the Northern Isles (Norðreyar) to Rǫgnvaldr as recompense for the death of his son. Rǫgnvaldr does not appear to have ever assumed the title and instead determined that his brother Sigurd should have it, which King Harald agreed to and Sigurd was installed as the Jarl of Orkney. Einarr, Thórir's half-brother, better known by the nickname Torf-Einarr, became the fourth Jarl of Orkney and established a direct bloodline that would rule for several hundred years.

Thórir's brother, Hrólfr, gained a reputation as a great Viking and was known as Gǫngu-Hrólfr ('Hrólfr the Walker') because, as Snorri Sturluson wrote in chapter 24 of Haralds saga ins hárfagra in Heimskringla, "[h]e was such a large man in size, that no horse could carry him, and he walked everywhere he went." Snorri went on to assert that Gǫngu-Hrólfr was none other than the famed Rollo, who became the first ruler of Normandy – after emerging as an outstanding warrior among the Norsemen who had secured a permanent foothold on Frankish soil in the valley of the lower Seine – and progenitor of the House of Normandy. These claims contradict the French- and Norman-origin texts composed in the centuries prior to Snorri's work in the 1200s and are heavily contested.

== Jarl of Møre ==
Two sons of King Harald Fairhair and Snjófríthr Svásadóttir, Hálfdan háleggr and Guðrøðr ljómi, killed Thórir's father, Rǫgnvaldr, by locking him in his longhouse with sixty of his men and setting it on fire. Gudrød took possession of the lands of Rǫgnvaldr while Hálfdan sailed west towards Orkney to overthrow Torf-Einarr. King Harald, apparently horrified by the actions of his sons, dispossessed Guðrøðr and restored Rǫgnvaldr's possessions to Thórir. In 892, Thórir assumed his role as jarl of Møre.

== Descendants ==
Thórir married Ólǫf árbót Haraldsdóttir (Norwegian: Ålov Årbot Haraldsdatter), daughter of Harald I of Norway (Harald Fairhair) and Gyða Eiríksdóttir. They had a daughter, Bergljót Þórisdóttir (born c. 914), who married Sigurð Hákonsson, Jarl of Lade and was mother of Hákon Sigurðsson.

Landnámabók attests two illegitimate children of Thórir by unnamed women:

- Vigdís Þórisdóttir, who was married to Ingimundr Þorsteinsson and settled in Iceland
- Jörundur háls Þórisson, mentioned as Thórir's other illegitimate child alongside Vigdís

Outside of the Norse tradition, he also charged with the paternity of:

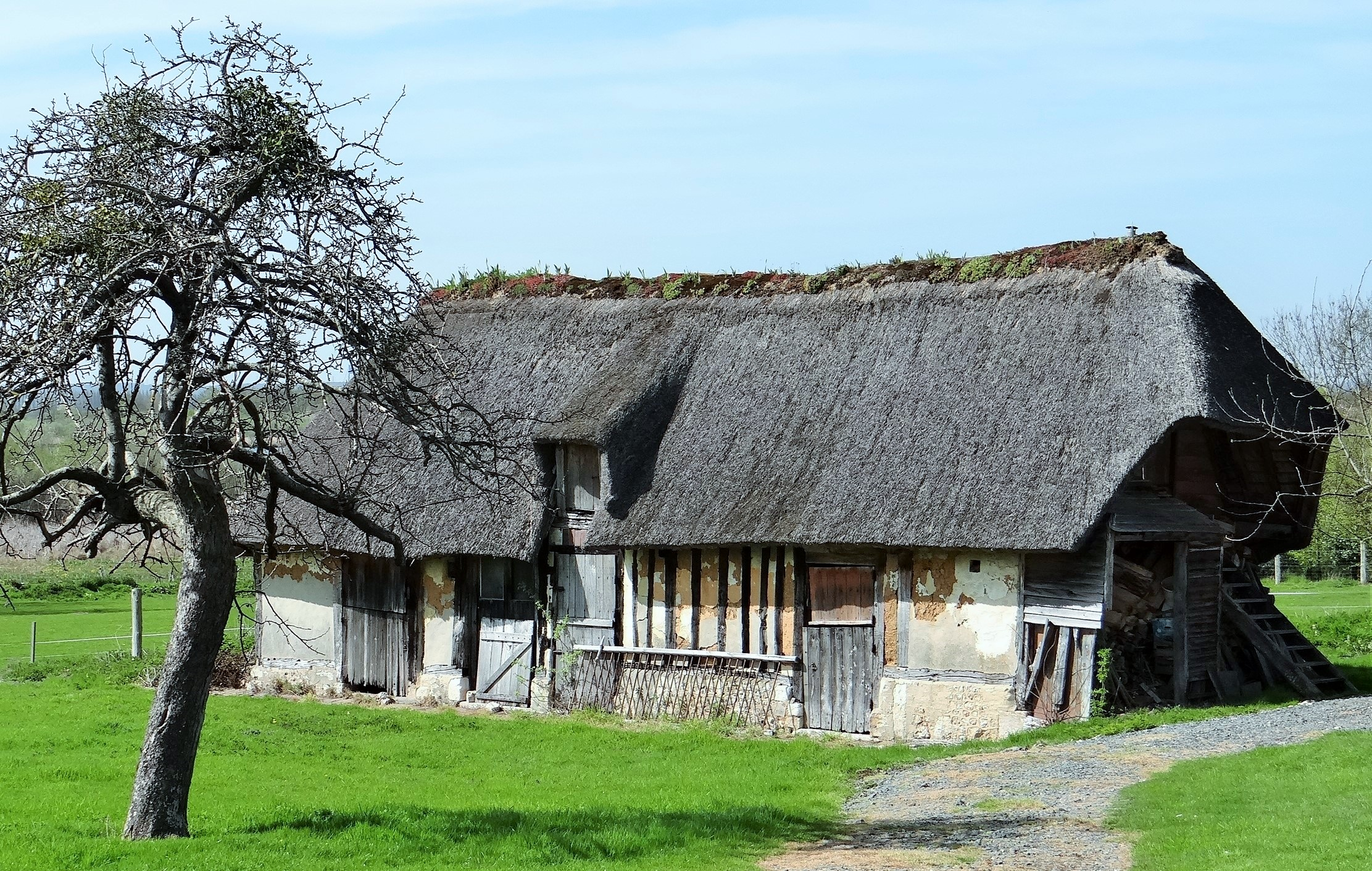
Norse barn near La-Grande-Mare, Sainte-Opportune-la-Mare, France

- Ljot av Møre, who would be the father of Bård Nesjekonge
- Oluffa
- Armond
- Thorbard av Møre (later Herbert de la Mare) was head of his uncle, Rollo's, fleet of ships during his conquest of Normandy in the 11th-century. For his bravery, he received the fief of Sainte-Oppurtune in Upper Normandy and was named the first lord of Sainte-Oppurtune-la-Mare which ultimately changed his name to Herbert de la Mare ("Herbert of the Sea"). He then married his cousin, Griselle, the daughter of Rollo and Gisela (the daughter of King Charles the Simple of Francia). Thorbard built a Norse castle (Châteaux-de-la-Mare) which stood for many centuries on the edge of the lake now called La Grand-Mare ("the big lake") . Today, the lands are a Norse heritage site consisting of a 53-km tourist trail (Route des Chaumières - "The Route of the Thatched Houses") and many reconstructed Viking longhouses, parishes, and barns. The lake is protected by the government as a nature preserve and bird sanctuary.
  - De la Mare family members (e.g. Herbert's great-grandson, Norman FitzGuillaume De la Mare) are believed to have taken part as lieutenants in the invasion of Sicily (Italy) led Tancred de Hauteville in 1041. In 1066, FitzNorman Guillaume de la Mare (b. 1025 C.E.) and several of his brothers joined the forces in the invasion of England under "William the Conqueror" (a distant relative). They fought at the Battle of Hastings and received the noble respect of England, receiving a 2400-acre tract of land which was named the "Delamare Forest". The Châteaux-de-la-Mare, built by the original Vikings in France continued to be the ownership of De la Mare descendants for almost 4 centuries until it was sold to the De la Moriniere family.
  - Another descendant of Herbert, Sir William Delemar, came to Ireland with "Strongbow" (a.k.a. Richard de Clare, the 2nd Earl of Pembroke) in 1170. When he returned to England, the King Henry II knighted him in high honor. His great-great-great-grandson, William de la Mare, founded and built the Multyfarnham Franciscan Friary at Mullingar from 1270 to 1306. The Delamar's were armed defensemen at the Multyfarnham Friary, providing protection for Franciscan priests fleeing the mainland of Europe during the Reformation.
  - Another descendant of Herbert de la Mare was Patrick Delmore. He was born at the on St. Patrick's Day in 1806 to Francis (1785–1847) and Catherine (née Hope) Delemar in Mullingar, County Westmeath. Patrick Delmore joined the British Army on 21 Sep 1824 at Dublin. He was stationed in Portugal, the Gibraltar, the Mediterranean, and the Caribbean regions before being sent to Montreal, Province of Canada in 1841 for peacekeeping duties following the Rebellions of 1837-38. Patrick served in the 60th, 67th, 97th, and 98th Regiments of Foot and the Royal Canadian Rifle Regiment. Patrick was married on April 11, 1841, to Jane Darragh, a native of County Antrim, Ireland at the Notré-Dame- Cathedral-de-Montreal. Patrick was discharged at the age of 44 to Fort Malden, and lived on his pensioned property (1 ¾ acre) on the corner of Richmond and Victoria Street in Amherstburg. Patrick sold the property in 1863 and bought land on the 4th Concession Road South, Anderdon. He died 12 Feb 1889 in Amherstburg.
  - The De La Mare descendants have many variations of their surname around the world including Delamare, De La Mare, Delamarre, Delamaior, Delemere, Delamer, Delamere, Delemar, Delamar, Demare, Delmar, Dilmore.
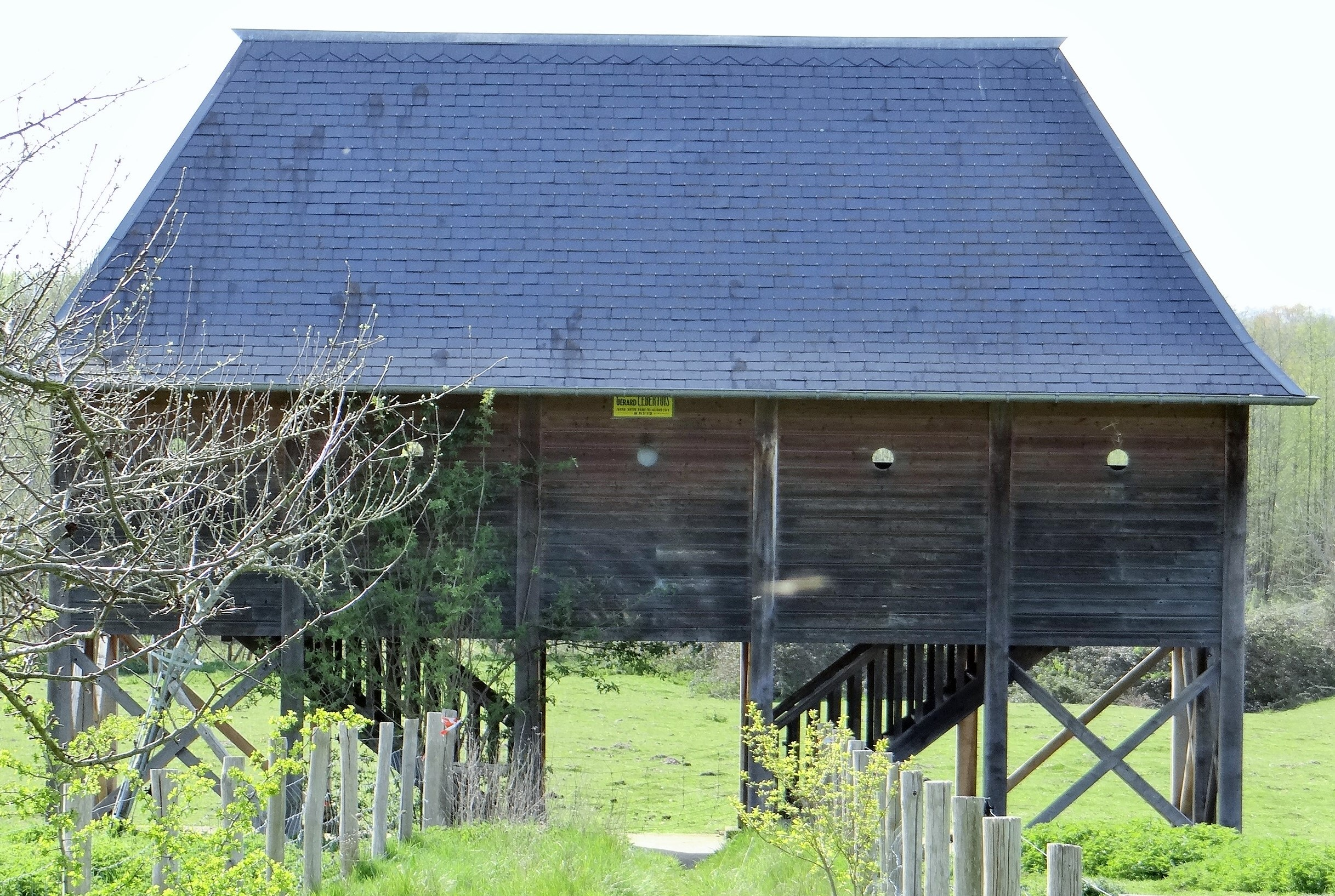
    Norse barn at Saint-Opportune-La-Mare
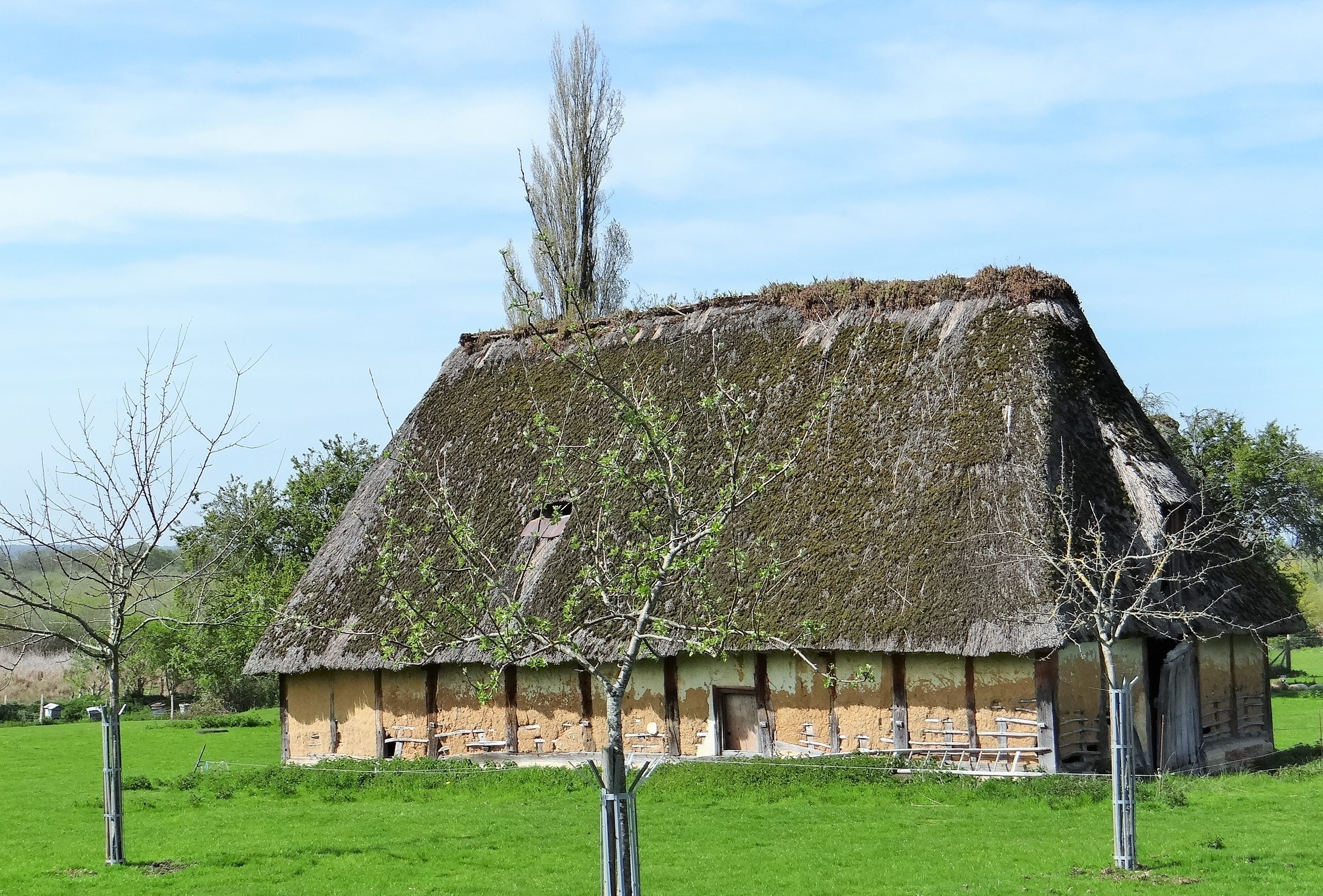
    Another Norse barn at Sainte-Opportune-la-Mare
