= Eirik of Hordaland =

Norwegian petty king

Eirik King of Hordaland (Old Norse: Eiríkr Konungr á Hǫrðalandi) was a king of Hordaland, then a petty kingdom in western Norway, in the late 9th century. Eirik was the father of Gyda. Eirik led the first attack against Harald Fairhair at the Battle of Hafrsfjord. Defeated by Harald, Eirik fell; many of his allies were also killed in the battle.

== In popular culture ==
Eirik is featured in the 2010 game Mount and Blade: Warband's Viking Conquest expansion as the lord of Hordaland.
