= Hildr Hrólfsdóttir =

9th-century Norwegian poet and noblewoman

Hildr or Ragnhildr Hrólfsdóttir was a 9th-century woman who is referenced in various Old Norse sources including Óláfs saga helga, Orkneyinga saga, and Landnámabók and is also one of the few female skalds from whom verses survive. Her stories furthermore are depicted on several picture stones from Gotland.

According to the sagas, Hild was the daughter of Rolv Nefia (Hrólfr nefja), jarl at Trondhjem (modern Trondheim). In the Orkneyinga saga, the daughter of Rolv Nefia is called Ragnhild, although in the Heimskringla she is called Hild. Her father used to go on viking expeditions. One summer he plundered in Vík. This aroused King Harald Fairhair's anger and he was banished. Hild appealed unsuccessfully for clemency for her father. On this occasion she composed a skaldic stanza (lausavísa), which is one of the few examples of skaldic poetry composed by a woman that have come down to us.

She was married to Rognvald Eysteinsson, who was the jarl of Møre. They had three sons: Ivar (Ívarr), Thorir (Þórir), and Rolv (Hrólfr). Thorir succeeded his father as jarl of Møre. Rolv (Hrólfr), nicknamed Gǫngu-Hrólfr (Rolv the Walker), became known as Rollo of Normandy. The death of Ivar during an earlier campaign in support of King Harald Fairhair resulted in the Northern Isles (Norðreyar) being gifted to his family as compensation. According to the Historia Norvegiae, Rognvald's family conquered Orkney and the Shetland Islands in the late 9th century.

== Related reading ==
- Crawford, Barbara (1987) Scandinavian Scotland (Leicester University Press, Leicester) ISBN 0-7185-1282-0
- Gudmundsdottir, Adalheidur, "Saga Motifs on Gotland Picture Stones. The Case of Hildr Högnadóttir," in Gotland's Picture Stones: Bearers of an Enigmatic Legacy, Gotland Museum, 2012.
- Muir, Tom (2005) Orkney in the Sagas: The Story of the Earldom of Orkney as told in the Icelandic Sagas (The Orcadian. Kirkwall) ISBN 0954886232.
- Pálsson, Hermann and Edwards, Paul Geoffrey (1981) Orkneyinga Saga: The History of the Earls of Orkney (Penguin Classics) ISBN 0-14-044383-5
