= Gyda Eiriksdatter =

Semi-legendary Norwegian concubine

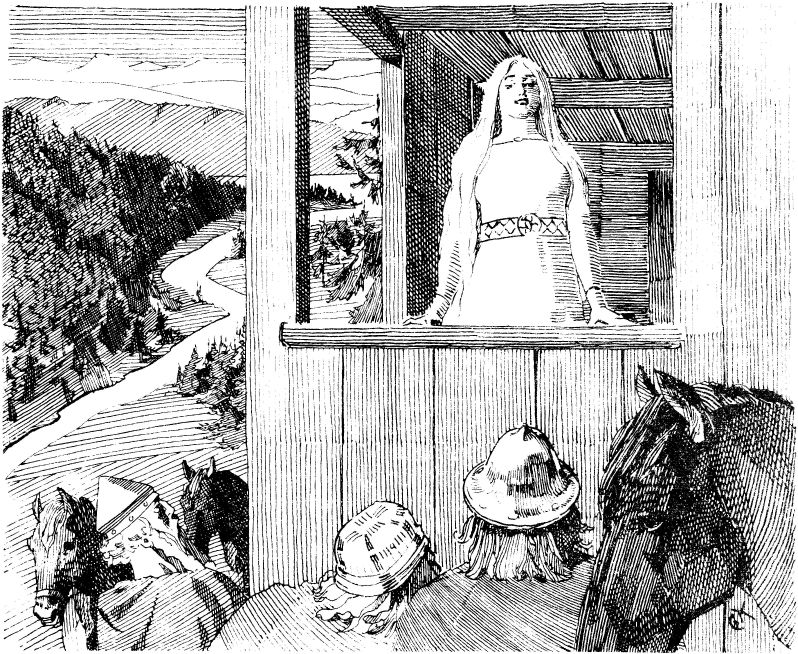
Gyda Eiriksdatter by Christian Krohg (1899)

Gyda Eiriksdottir of Hordaland (Gyða Eiríksdóttir) was a semi-legendary Norwegian concubine during the Viking Age. She appears in the Saga of Harald Fairhair (Harald Hårfagres saga) in Snorri Sturluson's Heimskringla. The story is not mentioned in any other source.

== Biography ==
The legend of Gyda describes the unification of Norway as somewhat of a love story. Gyda was born ca. 852 in Hordaland. She was the daughter of Eirik, King of Hordaland, (Eirik af Hordaland), one of the petty kings of pre-united Norway. Gyda was proposed to by Harold Fairhair who was then the king of the petty kingdom of Vestfold.

She answered that she refused to marry Harald "before he was king over all of Norway". Harald was therefore induced to take a vow not to cut nor comb his hair until he was sole king of Norway. Ten years later, in 872, Harald became king of a united Norway. He was justified in trimming his hair; whereupon he exchanged the epithet "shockhead" or "tanglehair" for the one by which he is usually known. He sent for Gyda reminding her of the promise and made her his concubine. Through the late 19th and 20th centuries the passage has been translated in Norway as Harald had Gyda sent for to marry, the text only states that Harald laid with Gyda: hann sendi þá menn eptir henni ok lét hana hafa til sín ok lagði hana hjá sér (He sent men after her and had her brought to him and he laid with her).

Most scholars today regard this story as a truthful representation of the romance stories that were popular at the time Heimskringla was written in the 13th Century.

== Children ==
- Ålov Årbot Haraldsdotter (Rogaland, 875 – Giske, Møre og Romsdal, 935), married Tore (þórir) Teiande, "Thore/Tore den Tause" ("the Silent") Ragnvaldssøn (c. 862 – Giske, Møre og Romsdal, a. 935), Jarl av Møre, and had children who went on to become the Hordaland branch of the old Galte ætt (clan).
- Rørek Haraldsson
- Sigtrygg Haraldsson
- Frode Haraldsson
- Torgils Haraldsson

== In popular culture ==
16-year old Gyda is featured in the 2010 game Mount and Blade: Warband's Viking Conquest expansion, and she can be found at Hordaland. A character broadly based on Gyda appears in season 4 of History Channel's Vikings as Princess Ellisif played by Irish actress Sophie Vavasseur.

Gyda Eiriksdatter
Preceded by None, new title	Queen Consort of Norway; 872–930	Succeeded by Gunnhild, Mother of Kings
