= Máel Brigte of Moray =

9th-century Pictish nobleman

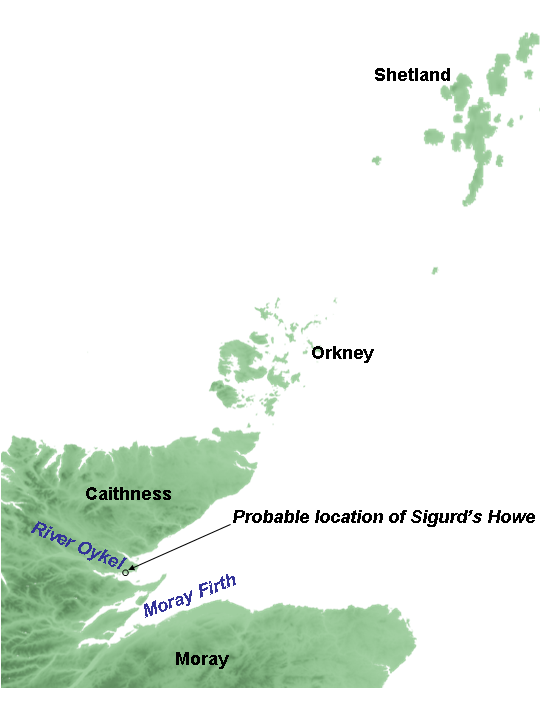
Map of North-eastern Scotland showing Orkney, Shetland, Caithness, and Moray. At his death, Sigurd Eysteinsson controlled the area north of the River Oykel. The probable site of his burial mound, Sigurd's Howe, is shown.

Máel Brigte, also known as Máel Brigte the Bucktoothed or Máel Brigte Tusk was a 9th-century Pictish nobleman, most probably a mormaer of Moray. He was responsible – in a bizarre posthumous incident – for the death of Earl Sigurd the Mighty of Orkney.

== Death ==
=== Battle with Sigurd the Mighty ===
Little is known of Máel Brigte's life, but the story of his death is recorded in the Orkneyinga Saga. According to this text, Máel Brigte was challenged by Sigurd to a 40-man-a-side battle to "settle their differences". Treacherously, Sigurd brought 80 men to the fight, and Máel Brigte knew he had been betrayed when he saw that each of Sigurd's horses had two men's legs on its flanks. Máel Brigte exhorted his men to "kill at least one man before we die ourselves" and although a fierce fight ensued, Máel Brigte was defeated and killed.

=== Posthumous killing of Sigurd ===
Sigurd had his enemies' heads strapped to his victorious men's saddles as trophies, but as Sigurd rode home, Máel Brigte's buck-tooth scratched his leg. The leg became inflamed and infected, and as a result Sigurd died.

== Legacy ==
The site of the battle is unknown. However the saga states that Earl Sigurd built a stronghold in the south of Moray, then a much larger province than today and that he was buried in a mound on the banks of the River Oykel. Máel Brigte's power centre was probably in or near modern Inverness. In the 13th century a farm near Dornoch, now called Cyderhall is recorded as "Syvardhoch", meaning "Sigurd's mound". It is therefore possible that the battle was staged in Easter Ross somewhere between these two places.

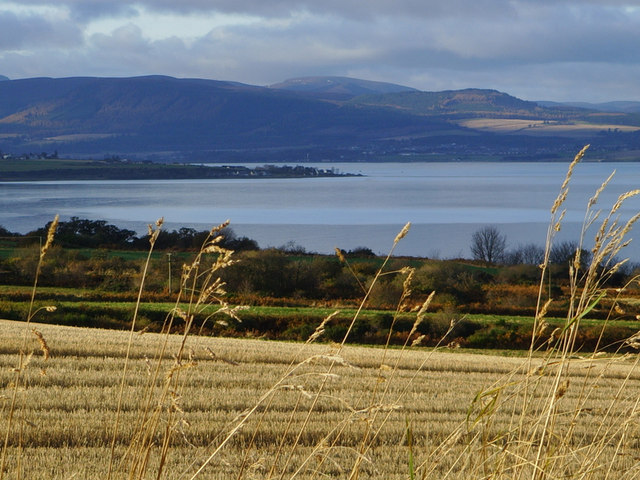
The landscape of Easter Ross

The Orkneyinga Saga records few specific dates and was not written down until circa 1200, some three centuries after the events it recorded about Máel Brigte and Sigurd took place. However it is thought that Sigurd Eysteinsson (aka "the Mighty"), ruled from about 875–92 so Máel Brigte's death may have taken place in the last quarter of the 9th century.

There is no other record of Máel Brigte's life, although another of this name is described in the mid 11th century as being the father of the Mormaer Máel Coluim of Moray.
