= Sigurd Eysteinsson =

Norse Jarl of Orkney

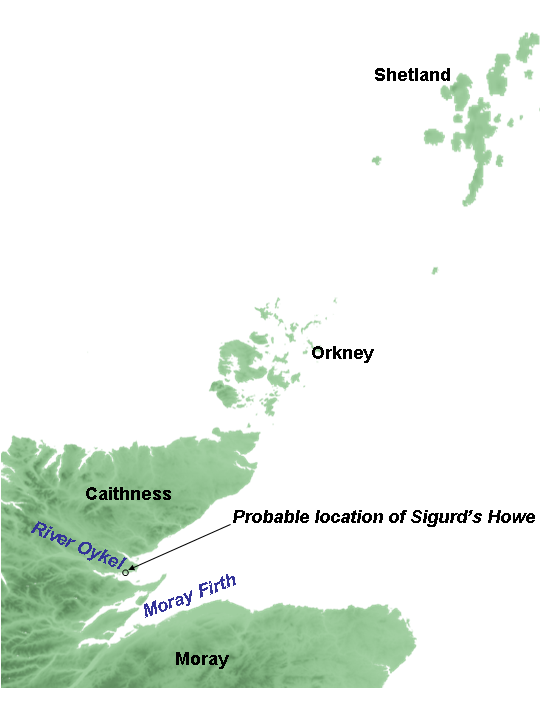
Map of north-eastern Scotland showing Orkney, Shetland, Caithness and Moray. At his death, Sigurd Eysteinsson controlled the area north of the river Oykel. The probable site of his burial mound, Sigurd's Howe, is shown.

Sigurd Eysteinsson, or Sigurd the Mighty (reigned c. 875–892), was the second Jarl of Orkney—a title bequeathed to Sigurd by his brother Rognvald Eysteinsson. A son of Eystein Glumra, Sigurd was a leader in the Viking conquest of what is now northern Scotland.

His death was said to have been caused by the severed head of Máel Brigte, whom Sigurd defeated in battle. As he rode a horse with Máel Brigte's head attached to his saddle as a trophy, one of Máel Brigte's teeth grazed against Sigurd's leg. The wound became infected, later causing Sigurd's death.

== Heimskringla and Orkneyinga ==
The two main sources for Sigurd's life are the Norse Heimskringla and Orkneyinga sagas. According to the sagas, after the Battle of Hafrsfjord unified the Norwegian kingdom in or after 872, the Orkney and Shetland islands became a refuge for exiled Vikings, who raided their former homeland. The king of Norway, Harald Fairhair, subdued the pirate Vikings with the aid of Rognvald Eysteinsson of Møre.

During the conquest, Rognvald's son, Ivar, was killed, and in compensation for his loss Harald gave Rognvald the islands along with the title of Jarl or Earl. With the consent of Harald, Rognvald transferred the title and lands to his brother Sigurd, who was one of Harald's forecastlemen. The Historia Norwegiæ, written around the same time as the sagas but from a different source, corroborates the conquest of the islands by Rognvald's family, but omits any details.

In league with Thorstein the Red, Sigurd expanded his domains to the Scottish mainland, and conquered Caithness and Sutherland at least as far south as Ekkjalsbakka, which some sources say was in Moray, but was much more likely to be farther north somewhere along the banks of the river Oykel. His exploits in conquering the north of Scotland became legendary and earned him the epithet, "the Mighty", or in Old Norse ríki.

== Sigurd's Howe ==
According to the Orkneyinga saga, towards the end of his reign, Sigurd challenged a native ruler, Máel Brigte the Buck-Toothed, to a 40-man-a-side battle. Treacherously, Sigurd brought 80 men to the fight. Máel Brigte was defeated and beheaded. Sigurd strapped the head to his saddle as a trophy, but as Sigurd rode, Máel Brigte's buck-tooth scratched his leg. The leg became inflamed and infected, leading to sepsis and Sigurd's death. He was buried in a tumulus known as Sigurd's Howe, or Sigurðar-haugr, from the Old Norse word haugr meaning mound or barrow. The location of Sigurd's Howe is most probably modern-day Sidera or Cyderhall near Dornoch. However, it has also been said that he was buried at Burghead in Moray.

Sigurd's death was apparently followed by a period of instability. He was succeeded by his son Guttorm, who died within a few months. Rognvald made his son Hallad Earl of Orkney, but Hallad could not contain the pirate Vikings, resigned his earldom and returned to Norway in disgrace. The sagas say that Rognvald's other sons were more interested in conquering places other than Scotland, and so the earldom was given to Rognvald's youngest son, Einarr, whose mother was a slave.
