= Orkneyinga saga =

Scandinavian-Scottish literary work

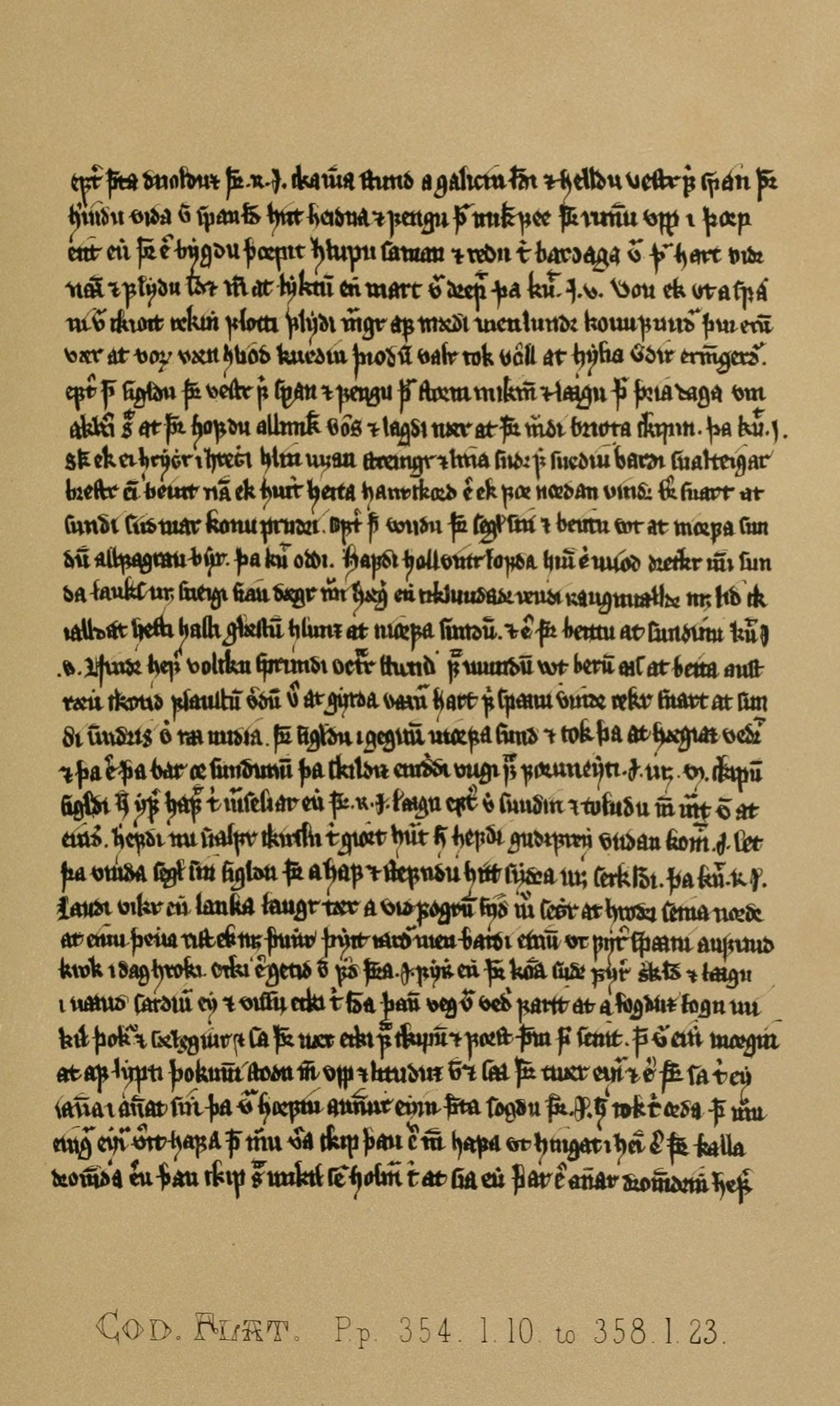
An example of a page from the Orkneyinga saga, as it appears in a printed copy of the 14th-century Flateyjarbók.

The Orkneyinga saga (Old Norse: [ˈorknˌœyjeŋɡɑ ˈsɑɣɑ]; Scottish Gaelic: Seanchas Arcach nan Lochlannach; also called the History of the Earls of Orkney and Jarls' Saga) is a narrative of the history of the Orkney and Shetland islands and their relationship with other local polities, particularly Norway and Scotland, written in Old Norse. The saga has "no parallel in the social and literary record of Scotland" and is "the only medieval chronicle to have Orkney as the central place of action". The main focus of the work is the line of jarls who ruled the Earldom of Orkney, which constituted the Norðreyjar or Northern Isles of Orkney and Shetland and there are frequent references to both archipelagoes throughout. (Note: The original saga was referred to as Earl's Saga more often than Orkneyinga Saga by medieval Icelanders and it has been argued that the latter name tends to obscure both Shetland and Shetlander's prominent roles.)

The narrative commences with a brief mythical ancestry tale and then proceeds to outline the Norse take-over of the Norðreyjar by Harald Fairhair – the take-over is not in doubt although the role of the king is no longer accepted by historians as a likelihood. The saga then outlines, with varying degrees of detail, the lives and times of the many jarls who ruled the islands between the 9th and 13th centuries. The extent to which the earlier sections in particular can be considered genuine history rather than fiction has been much debated by scholars.

There are several recurring themes in the Orkneyinga saga, including strife between brothers, relationships between the jarls and the Norwegian crown, and raiding in the Suðreyjar – the Hebrides and elsewhere. In part, the saga's purpose was to provide a history of the islands and enable its readers to "understand themselves through a knowledge of their origins" but even where its historical accuracy is lacking it provides modern scholars with insights into the motives of the writers and the politics of 13th century Orkney.

== Development and versions ==
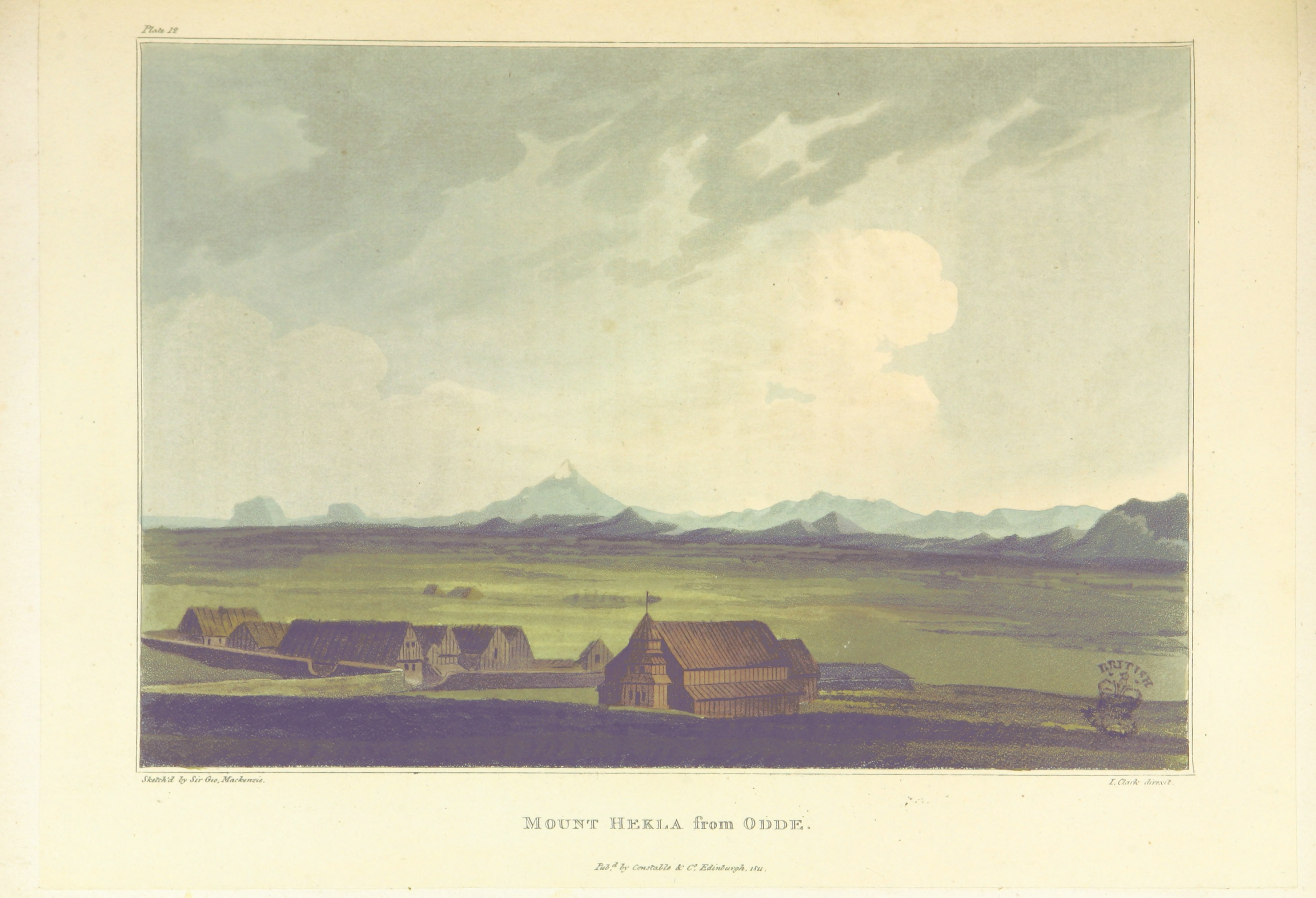
An early 19th-century illustration of "Mount Hekla from Odde"

The original text of this Norse saga was written in the late twelfth century. It no longer exists. A new version was written in the early thirteenth century (three centuries after some of the earliest events it records) by an unknown Icelandic author who was probably associated with the cultural centre at Oddi. Orkneyinga saga belongs to the genre of "Kings' Sagas" within Icelandic saga literature, a group of histories of the kings of Norway, the best known of which is Heimskringla, written by Snorri Sturluson. Indeed, Snorri used Orkneyinga saga as one of his sources for Heimskringla which was compiled around 1230 (and then Heimskringla became in turn a source for later versions of the Orkneyinga saga).

As was generally the case with Icelandic language writing of this period, the aims of the saga were to provide a sense of social continuity through the telling of history combined with an entertaining narrative drive. The saga is thought to have been compiled from a number of sources, combining family pedigrees, praise poetry and oral legends with historical facts. In the case of the Orkneyinga saga the document outlines the lives of the earls of Orkney and how they came about their earldom. Woolf (2007) suggests that the task that the Icelandic compiler was faced with was not dissimilar to trying to write a "history of the Second World War on the basis of Hollywood movies". He also notes that a problem with medieval Icelandic historiography in general is the difficulty of fixing of a clear chronology based on stories created in a largely illiterate society in which "AD dating was probably unknown".

As the narrative approaches the period closer to the time it was written down, some historians have greater confidence in its accuracy. For example, there are significant family connections between Snorri Sturluson and Earl Harald Maddadsson (d. 1206) and the original saga document was probably written down at about the time of Harald's death. (Note: Woolf (2007) states that a version "was clearly circulating as early as the 1220s.")

Gudbrand Vigfússon (1887) identified several different components to the saga, which may have had different authors and date from different periods. These are:

- Fundinn Noregr chapters 1–3
- Iarla Sogur chapters 4–38 (of which the sections regarding Earl Einarr are the oldest texts in the saga as a whole)
- St Magnus saga chapters 39–55
- Iarteina-bok (Magnus's "Miracle book") chapter 60
- The History of Earl Rognwald and Swain Asleifsson chapters 56–59 and 61–118. (Note: There are small differences in the chapter numbers used by Vigfússon (1887) and by Pálsson and Edwards (1981) e.g. Pálsson and Edwards chapter 12 "Death in Ireland" is split into two chapters by Vigfússon.)

A Danish translation dating to 1570 indicates that the original version of the saga ended with the death of Sweyn Asleifsson, who (according to the saga) was killed fighting in Dublin in 1171. Various additions were then added circa 1234-5 when a grandson of Asleifsson and a lawmaker called Hrafn visited Iceland. The oldest complete text is found in the late 14th century Flateyjarbók but the first translation into English did not appear until 1873.

== Narrative ==
The first three chapters of the saga are a brief folk legend that sets the scene for later events. It commences with characters associated with the elements – Snaer (snow), Logi (flame), Kari (storm) and Frosti (frost) and also gives a unique explanation for how Norway came to be named as such, involving Snaer's grandson Nór. There is also a reference to claiming land by dragging a boat over a neck of land (reprised in chapter 41 when Magnus Barefoot uses the same trick) and the division of the land between Nór and his brother Gór, which is a recurring theme in the saga. This legend also gives the Orkney jarls an origin involving a giant and king called Fornjót who lived in the far north. This clearly distinguishes them from the Norwegian kings as described in the Ynglingatal and may have been intended to give the jarls a more senior and more Nordic ancestry.

Having dealt with the mythical ancestry of the earls, the saga then moves on to topics that are apparently intended as genuine history.

=== Harald Fairhair and the voyage to the west ===
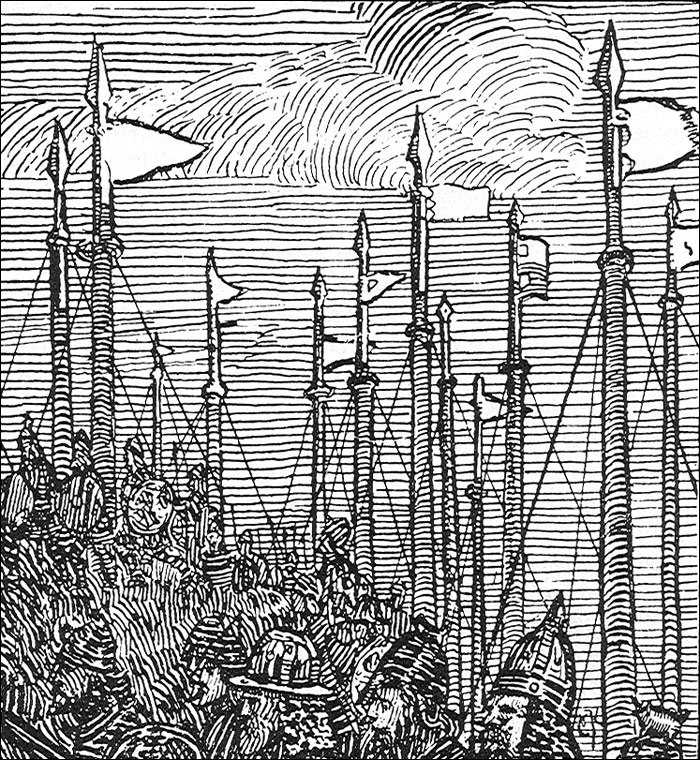
Magnus Barefoot's army in Ireland. It has been argued that Magnus's actions in the west form the basis of the saga narrative about the submission of Orkney and Shetland to Harald Fairhair's fleet.

The next few chapters deal with the creation of the Earldom of Orkney; they are brief and contain much less detail than the later events the saga describes. The saga states that Rognvald Eysteinsson ruled the earldom of Møre from the King of Norway, Harald Fairhair. Earl Rognvald accompanied the king on an expedition where they conquered the islands of Shetland, called Hjaltland, and Orkney, before they continued on to Scotland, Ireland and the Isle of Man. During this campaign Rognvald's son Ivarr was killed and in compensation Harald granted Earl Rognvald rule over Orkney and Shetland. Rognvald Earl thereafter returned to Norway, giving these islands to his brother Sigurd Eysteinsson. Sigurd had been the forecastleman on Harald's ship and after sailing back east the king "gave Sigurd the title of earl".

Sigurd "the Mighty" then died in a curious fashion, following a battle with Máel Brigte of Moray. Sigurd's son Gurthorm ruled for a single winter after this and died childless. Rognvald's son Hallad then inherited the title. However, unable to constrain Danish raids on Orkney, he gave up the earldom and returned to Norway, which "everyone thought was a huge joke."

First written down in the early 13th century, the saga is informed by the Norwegian politics of the day. Once, historians could write that no-one denied the reality of Harald Fairhair's expeditions to the west (recounted in detail in the Heimskringla), but this is no longer the case. Thomson (2008) writes that Harald's "great voyage is so thoroughly ingrained in popular and scholarly history, both ancient and modern, that it comes as a bit of a shock to realise that it might not be true." The Norwegian contest with the Kings of Scots over the Hebrides and the Isle of Man in the mid 13th century is the backdrop to the saga writer's intentions and in part at least the saga's aim to legitimise Norwegian claims to both the Northern Isles and the Kingdom of the Isles in the west.

It may be that the saga writers drew on a genuine tradition of a voyage by Harald to the west, or that they simply invented it wholesale for political purposes, but it is evident that there are elements included in the narrative that are drawn from the much later expeditions undertaken by Magnus Barefoot. The situation faced by Earl Harald Maddadsson of Orkney in 1195, shortly before the time that the sagas were first written down, when he was forced to submit himself to royal authority after an ill-judged intervention in Norwegian affairs would have made legendary material of this nature of considerable interest in Orkney at the time. Nonetheless, the view that the Orkney earldom was created by "members of the Møre family" continues to receive academic support.

=== Torf-Einarr ===
Hallad's failure led to Rognvald flying into a rage and summoning his sons Thorir and Hrollaug. He asked which of them wanted the islands but Thorir said the decision was up to the earl himself. Rognvald predicted that Thorir's path would keep him in Norway and that Hrollaug was destined seek his fortune in Iceland. Einarr, the youngest of his natural sons, then came forward and offered to go to the islands. Rognvald said: "Considering the kind of mother you have, slave-born on each side of her family, you are not likely to make much of a ruler. But I agree, the sooner you leave and the later you return the happier I'll be." Despite his father's misgivings, on arrival on the islands, Einarr fought and defeated two Danish warlords who had taken residence there. Einarr then established himself as earl and founded a dynasty which retained control of the islands for centuries after his death.

The scene in which Einarr's father scorns him is a literary device which often figures in Old Norse literature. The dialogue between the father and his sons has been interpreted as being about Rognvald's desire to cement his own position as Earl of Møre and an allusion to the early history of Iceland, where the saga was written. Thorir is a compliant son who Rognvald is happy to keep at home. Hrolluag is portrayed as a man of peace who will go to Iceland. Einarr is aggressive and a threat to his father's position so can be spared for the dangers of Orkney. (In the Landnámabók version the equally aggressive brother Hrolfr is also present, and his destiny is anticipated to be in conveniently far-away Normandy.) (Note: In the Heimskringla Hrolfr is banished by King Harald.)

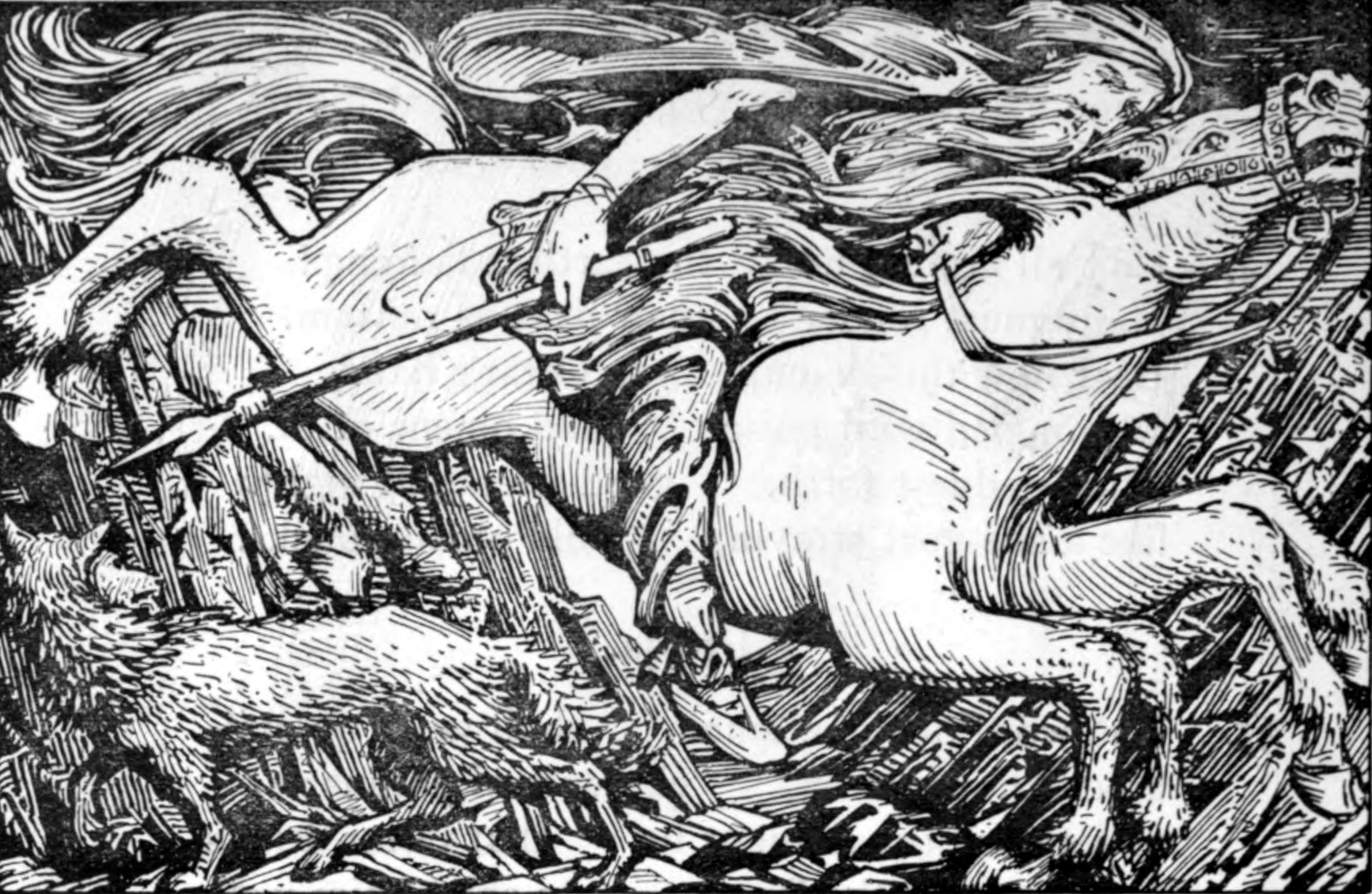
"Odin Rides to Hel" (1908) by W. G. Collingwood

Einarr is also provided with various characteristics associated with Odin. Both have but one eye and the death of an opponent at Einarr's hands is offered to the god—an act that contains a hint of Odin's own sacrifice to himself in the Hávamál. Einarr is a man of action who is self-made, and he is a successful warrior who (unlike his brothers) avenges his father's death. He leads a dramatic and memomorable life and emerges as "ancient, powerful and mysterious—but as a literary figure rather than a real person". He is also a heathen whose appearance at the commencement of the saga contrasts with the later martyrdom of his descendant St Magnus, which event marks a "moral high-point" of the story.

=== Sigurd the Stout ===
The death of Earl Sigurd Hlodvirsson (980–1014) is the subject of the earliest known contemporary reference to the earldom of Orkney. The 12th-century Irish source, the Cogadh Gaedhil re Gallaibh, records the events of the Battle of Clontarf in 1014. The "foreigners and Leinstermen" were led by Brodir of the Isle of Man and Sigurd, and the battle lasted all day, but the Irishmen ultimately drove back their enemies into the sea. His death is corroborated by the Annals of Ulster, which record that amongst the dead was "Siuchraid son of Loduir, iarla Innsi Orcc" (i.e. of Sigurd, son of Hlodvir, Earl of Orkney).

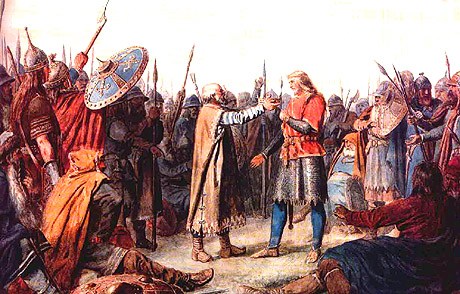
King Olaf Tryggvason of Norway, who is said to have forcibly Christianised Orkney. Painting by Peter Nicolai Arbo.

According to the Orkneyinga saga, the Northern Isles had been Christianised by King Olaf Tryggvasson in 995 when he stopped at South Walls on his way from Ireland to Norway. The King summoned jarl Sigurd and said "I order you and all your subjects to be baptised. If you refuse, I'll have you killed on the spot and I swear I will ravage every island with fire and steel." Unsurprisingly, Sigurd agreed and the islands became Christian at a stroke. However, when the sagas were written down Orkney had been Christian for 200 years or more and the conversion tale itself has been described as "blatantly unhistorical". When the Norse arrived in the Northern Isles they would have found organised Christianity already thriving there, although there is no mention of this at all in the sagas.

=== Earl Thorfinn ===
Virtually nothing about Thorfinn Sigurdsson's life is corroborated from contemporary sources and the saga writer seems to have obtained most of his material from the poem Þórfinnsdrápa, which was written by his court poet Arnór immediately following his death.

The Orkneyinga Saga says that a dispute between Thorfinn and Karl Hundason began when the latter became "King of Scots" and claimed Caithness, his forces successfully moving north and basing themselves in Thurso. In the war which followed, Thorfinn defeated Karl in a sea-battle off Deerness at the east end of the Orkney Mainland. Then Karl's nephew Mutatan or Muddan, appointed to rule Caithness for him, was killed in Caithness by Thorkel Fosterer. Finally, a great battle at "Torfness" (probably Tarbat Ness on the south side of the Dornoch Firth) ended with Karl either being killed or forced to flee. Thorfinn, the saga says, then marched south through Scotland as far as Fife, burning and plundering as he passed. As a result of his military exploits Thorfinn became Mormaer of Caithness and during the first twenty years of his long earldom he was often based there. He was thus a vassal of both the King of Norway and the King of Scots, a status and title that was held by many of his successors. (Note: There is no other example in the history of either Norway or of Scotland in which a dynasty of earls owed their allegiance to two different kings.) Thorfinn also became King of the Isles from 1035, which title was only held amongst the earls of Orkney by Sigurd Eysteinsson before him, and after him possibly by Einar Sigurdsson and for a brief period by Sigurd Magnusson as the under-age son of Magnus Barefoot.

=== St Magnus ===
Magnus Erlendsson, Thorfinn's grandson, had a reputation for piety and gentleness, which the Norwegians viewed as cowardice. Having been taken hostage by King Magnus Barefoot, he refused to fight in a Viking raid in Anglesey because of his religious convictions, and instead stayed on board the ship during the Battle of Menai Straits, singing psalms. His brother Erling died while campaigning with King Magnus, either at that same battle or in Ulster.

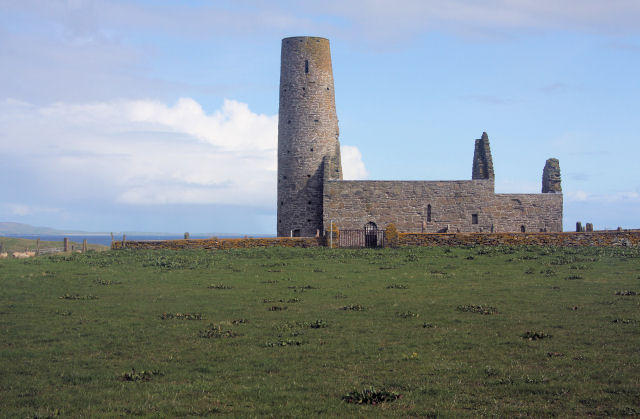
The ruins of St Magnus Church, on the island of Egilsay

Magnus was obliged to take refuge in Scotland, but returned to Orkney in 1105 and disputed the succession with his cousin Haakon Paulsson. Having failed to reach an agreement, he sought help from King Eystein I of Norway, who granted him the earldom of Orkney and he ruled jointly and amicably with Haakon until 1114. Eventually however, the followers of the two earls fell out, and the sides met at an assembly on the Orkney mainland in 1117. Peace was negotiated and the Earls arranged to meet each other to formalise this at Easter on the island of Egilsay, each bringing only two ships. Magnus arrived with his two, but then Haakon treacherously turned up with eight ships.

Magnus took refuge in the island's church overnight, but the following day he was captured and an angry Haakon made his cook Lifolf kill Magnus by striking him on the head with an axe. It was said that Magnus first prayed for the souls of his executioners. Sometime later William the Old, Bishop of Orkney, was struck blind in his church, but subsequently had his sight restored after praying at the grave of Magnus. He also later sanctified the murdered Earl. St Magnus Church, Egilsay, was constructed on the island shortly afterwards, at or near the supposed site of the murder.

Magnus's nephew, Rögnvald Kali Kolsson, laid claim to the Earldom of Orkney, and was advised by his father Kol to promise the islanders to "build a stone minster at Kirkwall" in memory of his uncle the Holy Earl, and this became St Magnus Cathedral. When the cathedral, begun in 1137, was ready for consecration the relics of St Magnus were transferred there.

=== Sweyn Asleifsson and Earl Rögnavald ===
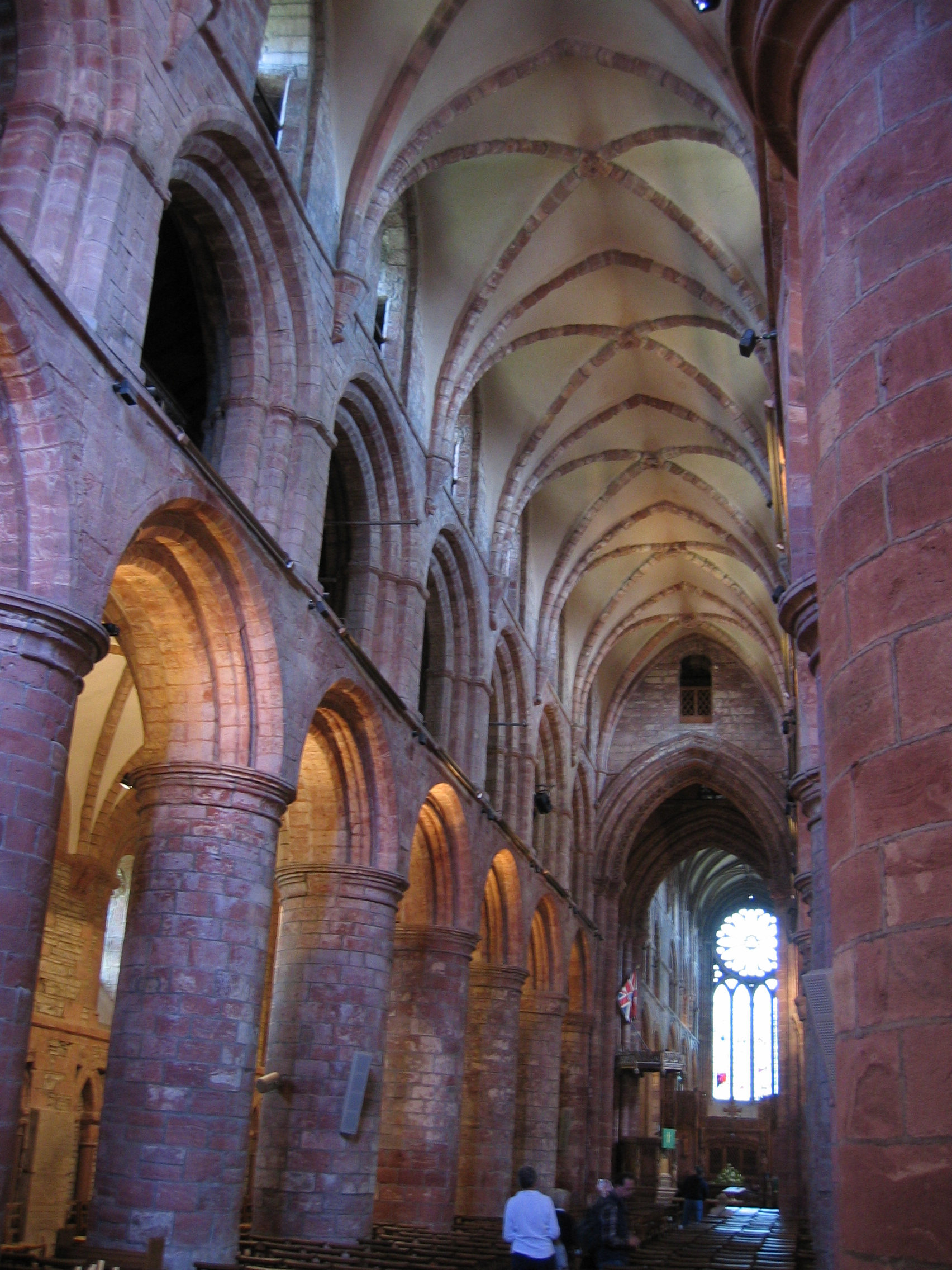
The interior of St. Magnus Cathedral, which was constructed in the 12th century under the supervision of Kol, father of Earl Rögnvald Kali Kolsson

As this part of the saga was written only a few decades after Asleifsson's death it is reasonable to suppose these chapters more accurately reflect the events they describe than the histories of earlier times. Asleifsson is depicted as the quintessential Viking, a freebooter whose activities include drunkenness, murder and plundering and whose support is crucial to the politics of the Orkney earldom. Although he was not an earl his activities take up fully one quarter of the saga and the oldest version ends with his death.

His tale is closely bound up with that of Earl Rögnvald, a more rounded character who is also a troubadour and, like his uncle Magnus, ultimately a saint, and it may be that the saga writers were seeking to portray them as exemplars of the Viking lifestyle. However, there may also be a more complex moral to the story. Although Ásleifsson's dying words are "Be it known to all men... that I belong to the bodyguard of Saint Rögnvald the Earl", he also blackmailed Rögnvald and caused him a great deal of trouble. It is possible that the saga intends to cast Rögnvald as a weak leader who was unable control his nobles.

Another interpretation of the narrative is that rather than seeing these two men as protagonist and antagonist that together they live in a golden age where the earl is a cultured ruler and primus inter pares but who owes his position in part to his band of "worthy warriors" and is by no means a despot who rules by divine right. In this case the whole story may be seen as a reaction to the Norwegian royal propaganda of the age that sought to promote the central authority of the crown.

If the height of the earls' military strength was during the 11th century time of Thorfinn "the Mighty", the reign of Earl Rögnvald Kali Kolson marks the 12th century cultural high point of the saga.

=== Later Earls ===
Earl Harald "the Old" Maddadsson (c. 1134 – 1206) ruled jointly with Earl Rognvald for part of his long tenure. When King Eystein Haraldsson undertook a raiding expedition from Norway against Orkney he encountered Harald near Thurso and captured him. Harald was freed in return for a ransom in gold and by giving his oath to Eystein. Eystein then went on to raid the coasts of Scotland and England.

Possibly as a result of Eystein's activities, King David I granted half of Caithness to Harald's cousin, Erlend Haraldsson. The result was a political struggle which ended with Erlend's murder in 1154. Sweyn Asleifsson was again heavily involved in this dynastic conflict. In 1153 King David died and was succeeded by his young grandson, Malcolm IV. King Eystein too died in a war with his brothers Ingi and Sigurd. As a result, by 1158 Harald Maddadsson was undisputed Earl of Orkney, with neither the King of Scots nor the King of Norway in a position to contest his power.

The final, brief chapters of the later version of the saga depict the lives of Harald's four successors who ruled until the murder of Jon Haraldsson in 1231, bringing the line of specifically Norse earls of Orkney to an end (Note: It is frequently stated that the death of Jon Haraldsson brought the line of Norse earls of Orkney to a close. An argument in favour of this view is that he was the last apparently direct descendant of Torf-Einar Sigurdsson to hold the title with the subsequent Angus earls possibly succeeding via marriage to a female descendant of the earls. However it has also been pointed out that Harald Maddadson was the son of a Scottish earl – Matad, Earl of Atholl – and a female heiress of Orkney – Margaret, a daughter of Haakon Paulsson. It may be that the brief reference to the succession of Earl Jon in the last line of the later version of the Orkneyinga saga has tended to distort modern perceptions of the issues.) although Orkney and Shetland remained part of Norway until the 15th century.

== History or fable? ==
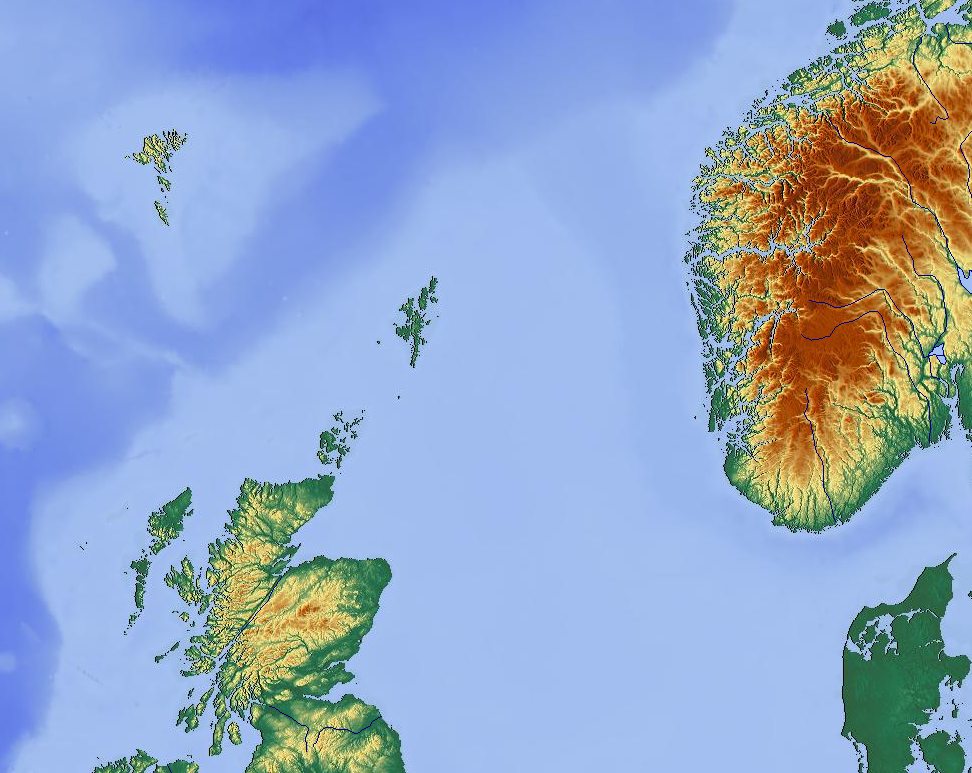
Orkney and Shetland at centre, in relation to nearby territories

There is clearly doubt about the historicity of many of the claims in the Orkneyinga saga and the extent to which euhemerism may be an appropriate approach. Just as the backdrop to the supposed great expedition to the west undertaken by King Harald Fairhair that led to the founding of the Orkney earldom was the mid-13th century Norwegian contest with the Kings of Scots over the Hebrides, so also events that have been included in the saga as embellishments to the life of Earl Thorfinn have a number of parallels with the life of Harald Maddadsson. Woolf (2007) speculates that aspects of Thorfinn's story may have been included to legitimise the latter's adventures.

Early in the narrative in particular, there are examples of obviously fictional elements such as Earl Sigurd's raven banner and also in some later events such as the effects of the poisoned shirt that supposedly killed Earl Harald Haakonsson. Furthermore, there is the regular use of standard Norse dramatic situations. For example, the story of the killing of Rognvald Brusason by Earl Thorfinn "is saga-fiction, and it contains some stock-episodes which are repeated elsewhere in the saga". Another example of the saga writer's fictional devices is found in the tale of Haakon Paulsson's travels through Scandinavia where he meets a fortune teller. The sooth-sayer's predictions are in effect a "table of contents" for his later travails with his cousin Magnus and an example of "the frequent need to disentangle the historical Magnus from the saga's story-telling techniques".

However, there are also examples of events depicted in the saga that have been thought of as essentially fictional, but have later been shown to have some basis in fact. For example, towards the end of his reign as earl, Sigurd Eysteinsson is said to have challenged a native ruler, Máel Brigte the Bucktoothed, to a 40-man-a-side battle. Treacherously, Sigurd brought 80 men to the fight and Máel Brigte was defeated and beheaded. Sigurd strapped the head to his saddle as a trophy, but as Sigurd rode home, Máel Brigte's buck-tooth scratched his leg. The leg became inflamed and infected, and as a result Sigurd died. He was buried in a tumulus known as Sigurd's Howe, or Sigurðar-haugr. The location of Sigurd's Howe is most probably modern-day Sidera or Cyderhall near Dornoch, which discovery was not made until the late 19th century. (Note: Crawford (1986) credits Joseph Anderson with the discovery, who mentions a 13th century document that corroborated a local tradition about Sigurd's burial in his introduction to the 1873 translation of the saga by Hjaltalin and Goudie.) Another example concerns a King of Scots, apparently named Karl Hundason.

=== Who was Karl Hundason? ===
The identity of Karl Hundason, unknown to Scots and Irish sources, has long been a matter of dispute. His existence rests solely on the Orkneyinga saga, and more particularly on those elements of Þórfinnsdrápa which are preserved within it. (Note: Arnór's poetry is quoted verbatim in the saga, interspersed with various embellishments in the narrative. Arnór was in Orkney at or about the time of this conflict and it is he who describes Thorfinn's foe as "Karl" and "lord of the Scots". It is the saga writer who adds the patronymic "Hundasson".)

Robertson (1862) proposed that Hundason should be identified with Duncan I. William Forbes Skene suggested that Karl (or Kali) Hundason should be identified with "Malcolm MacKenneth", a son of Kenneth III. Another candidate is Macbeth whose father may be called "jarl Hundi" in Njál's saga. Woolf (2007) proposes that Hundason, rather that being some hitherto unknown Scots king, was the son of Thorfinn's brother Hundi. However, Thomson (2008) notes that both the Orkneyinga saga and St Olaf's saga suggest Hundi only lived "a short while" and was unlikely to have had a son himself. Anderson (1990) suggested that this is "a fabulous story" and concluded that "[n]o solution to the riddle seems to be justified".

Muir (2005) points out that a literal translation of "Karl Hundisson" is "peasant son-of-a-dog", an insult that would have been obvious to Norse-speakers hearing the saga and that "we can assume this wasn't his real name". The implication is that there is no purpose in seeking phonetic parallels with known Scots personages. Thomson points out that both "Karl" and Hundi" are names used in other contexts without disparaging intentions although the combination is otherwise unknown.

Thomson also notes that the war with Hundasson seem to have taken place between 1029 and 1035 and that the Annals of Ulster record the violent death of Gillacomgain, son of Mael Brigte and Mormaer of Moray in 1032. He too is thus a candidate for Thorfinn's Scots foe—and the manner of his death by fire bears comparison with Arnór's poetic description of the aftermath of the battle at Torfness.

Whoever Karl son of Hundi may have been, it appears that the saga is reporting a local conflict with a Scots ruler of Moray or Ross:

[T]he whole narrative is consistent with the idea that the struggle of Thorfinn and Karl is a continuation of that which had been waged since the ninth century by the Orkney earls, notably Sigurd Rognvald's son, Ljot, and Sigurd the Stout, against the princes or mormaers of Moray, Sutherland, Ross, and Argyll, and that, in fine, Malcolm and Karl were mormaers of one of these four provinces. (Note: There were only two Earls of Orkney named Sigurd. Taylor clearly identifies Sigurd "the Stout" Hlodvirsson but the earlier Sigurd ("the Mighty") was Rognvald Eysteinsson's brother, not his son.)

It is therefore entirely possible that Thorfinn's campaign was not fought against the Scottish crown as such but that rather the Scots may have been his allies in a struggle they both had against the power of Moray.

== Themes ==
=== Gender ===
It is evident that the main characters of the saga are the exclusively male jarls and kings and their male supporters and antagonists. Nonetheless, it is believed that women enjoyed a relatively high status during the Viking Age, possibly due to the high degree of mobility in society and they regularly appear in supporting roles. Amongst them are Gunnhild "Mother of Kings" Gormsdóttir; Ingibiorg "the Earls'-mother" Finnsdottir, wife of Earl Thorfinn; Frakokk, whose poisoned shirt was involved in the death of her nephew Earl Harald Haakonsson; Helga Moddansdottir, sister of Frakkok and mother of Ingibjörg Hakonsdóttir who married King Olaf Godredsson; and Gunnhild, sister of Magnus Erlendsson and mother of Earl Rognvald. On the other hand, the idea of "courtly love" plays a much more prominent part in the literature of continental Europe for the same period than in the sagas in general.

=== Orkney and Norway ===
Woolf (2007) argues that the "saga's main theme, in so far as it can be said to have one, seems to have been to tie in the history of the earldom with that of the kings of Norway and to establish clearly the history of the relationships between the two polities." Crawford (1987) observes several sub-themes: "of submission and of overlordship; the problem of dual allegiance and the threat of the earls looking to the kings of Scots as an alternative source of support; the Norwegian kings' use of hostages; and their general aim of attempting to turn the Orkney earls into royal officials bound to them by oaths of homage, and returning tribute to them on a regular basis."

An example is the passing of the title of Earl of Orkney from Rognvald Eysteinsson, who received it from the Norwegian crown, to his brother Sigurd. The notion that Rognvald could hand over his title in this way has been interpreted in various ways. It may be that Rognvald considered the gift from the king as a mixed blessing, but this is an instance in which the writer of the Orkneyinga saga attempts to reconcile the conflicting themes of independence from Norway (Rognvald gifts the islands to Sigurd) and dependence on royal authority (King Harald formalises the process by confirming Sigurd as earl). Beuermann (2011) speculates that Rognvald's transfer of power to his brother may have been an attempt by the saga writers to imply that the Orkney earldom had more independence from Norway than that of Rognvald's earldom of Møre and that the earl's holdings in Caithness may have allowed for an even greater degree of freedom of action. Such implications are more likely to be rooted in the writer's interest in emphasising Orcadian independence at the time of writing rather than the 9th/10th century events they purport to describe.

Similarly, the story of Torf-Einar in the next generation touches on this theme. The writer of the saga established Einarr's status in two contradictory ways. Although in the Historia Norvegia Rognvald of Møre's family are described as "pirates" the Orkneyinga saga provides them with a legally established earldom instated by the king. On the other hand, Einarr success is largely down to his own efforts and he negotiates with King Harald rather than offers blind obedience. The author is thus able to emphasise both the legitimacy and independence of his house.

=== Kinstrife ===
Joint earldoms were a frequent feature of the Norse earldom and Thomson (2008) identifies a different intention at the heart of the saga. This joint rulership was "inherently unstable and usually ended in violence". He identifies these family feuds as being the main theme, culminating in the martyrdom of St Magnus c.1115, and that the writer is emphasising the doom of "kin-slaying". Examples include the fratricidal strife that engulfed the sons of Earl Thorfinn in which they were abetted by Ragnhild Eriksdotter, the deaths of Einar Sigurdsson and his nephew Rognvald Brusason at the hands of Thorkel Fosterer, the henchman of Thorfinn as well as the homicidal dispute between the cousins Haakon Paulsson and Magnus Erlendsson itself that led to the latter's canonisation. Indeed, the rivalry between the two families that Paul and Erlend founded were still alive four generations later when the Orkneyinga Saga was written down.

Although the saga frequently mentions placenames it is largely silent on the subject of how the joint earldoms functioned on a geographical basis. It is possible that Brusi Sigurdsson's share, described as the "northernmost part of the isles", was those islands lying north of the Orkney mainland, that his brother Einar "Wry-mouth" Sigurdsson's was originally the east Mainland and the south isles and that Sumarlidi Sigurdsson's was the west Mainland. (Note: This theory, based on the Orcadian distribution of ouncelands was originally researched by J. Storer Clouston in the 1920s and was "enormously influential" but also "preposterous" according to Smith (1988).) However, it is also possible that Brusi's share was Shetland, which formed part of the earldom throughout the Norse period. This possibility is supported by a later reference to his son Rognvald as "Lord of the Shetlanders" and Thompson (2008) is in "no doubt" that Shetland was in Brusi's possession. It is likely that Fair Isle marked the boundary between these shares both then and during later joint earldoms. (Note: Warriors from the Northern Isles (Øyskjeggs), led by Harald Maddadson's brother-in-law Olaf fought on behalf of Sigurd Magnusson against King Sverre Sigurdsson. Sverre and his force confronted the Øyskjeggs in the spring of 1194, when the two fleets met north of Bergen. In the ensuing battle the Norwegians claimed a decisive victory. King Sverre appears to have believed that Harald Maddadson was involved in the affair and he punished Harald by placing Shetland under the direct rule of the Norwegian Crown, which was not returned to the care of the Orkney earldom during his lifetime.)

=== Religion and morality ===
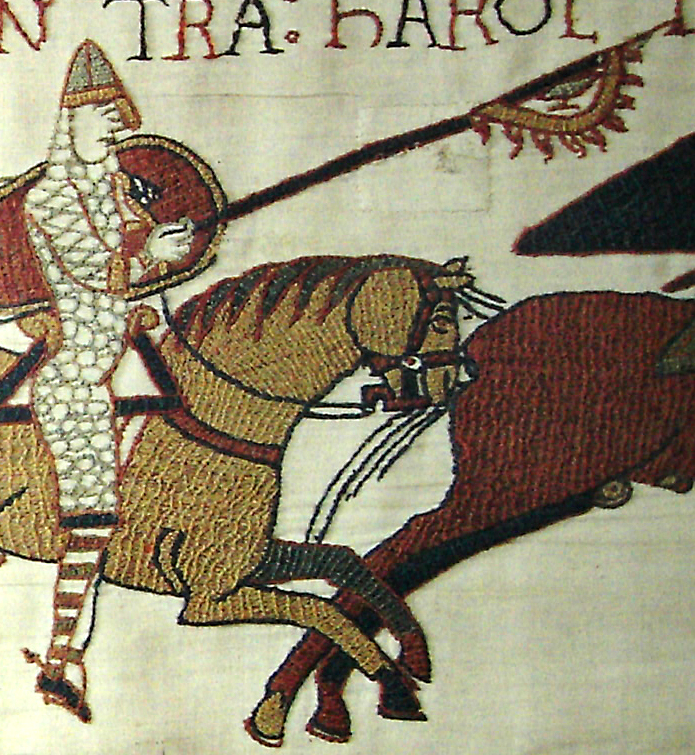
Detail from the Bayeux Tapestry, showing a Norman knight carrying what appears to be a raven banner

The accuracy with which the saga addresses the conversion of Orkney and Shetland to Christianity has been touched on above and the weight of archaeological evidence suggests that Christian burial was already widespread in Orkney by Sigurd Hlodvirsson's time. The intention may have been to disown the influence of indigenous elements of Orcadian and Shetland culture (such as the existence of this religion prior to the arrival of the Norse) and emphasise that positive cultural developments came from Scandinavia, whilst at the same time critiquing the unduly blunt method of Norwegian interference in this case.

The inclusion of the tale of the raven banner in the saga material may convey the idea of a revival of heathenism in Orcadian society and a reaction to Norwegian attempts to control the islands. However, in the Orkneyinga Saga there is a vivid contrast between Sigurd's death clutching the raven banner and the later career of his son Thorfinn, who is credited with several achievements in bringing Orkney into mainstream Christendom. Taken as a whole the intention may be to draw attention to this transition.

Rögnvald Kali Kolsson's pilgrimage to Jerusalem has a different flavour from the politicking and violence that permeates much of the rest of the saga. There are romantic touches and the earl's poetry is emphasised. There is a case for regarding this episode as the "central quest" of the saga and the poetry emphasises some of the contradictions at the heart of the medieval Orcadian world. Society is both pagan and Christian, violence goes hand-in-hand with maganimity, kinstrife is frequent yet "the bonds of sworn friendship cannot be broken".

=== Other elements ===
Another recurring theme in the Orkneyinga saga is raiding in the Hebrides, which is touched on during the saga's coverage of Rognvald Eysteinsson's life and times in the earliest part of the story and on several other occasions up to the last chapters and Sweyn Asleifsson's exploits. Remarkably, neither the Orkneyinga Saga nor any other Kings' Sagas refers to the Irish Sea campaign by Magnus Haraldsson in 1058, which is the first such event attested in contemporary sources in the British Isles. The authors of the sagas may have believed these events were easily confused with Magnus Barefoot's later invasion and that as the earlier Magnus had no royal descendants at the time the stories were committed to writing no-one of importance would lose face by omitting them. Woolf (2007) suggests this shortcoming in the historical record "serves as a warning" about the saga's reliability in general.

At the time the Orkneyinga saga was first written down Haakon Paulsson's grandson, Harald Maddadsson, was Earl of Orkney and the writer clearly had some difficulty in portraying the kin-slaying of Magnus Erlendsson. Thomson (2008) concludes that the "assembly" that sentenced Magnus was either invented or heavily emphasised in order to "divert some of the blame from Hakon". Furthermore, in reporting on Earl Haakon's death the saga reports that this was "felt to be a great loss, his later years having been very peaceful". Commenting on the complex relationship between history and invention in the saga Joseph Anderson wrote:

When great events and mighty deeds were preserved for posterity by oral recitation alone, it was necessary that the memory should be enabled to retain its hold of the elements of the story by some extraneous artistic aid, and therefore they were welded by the wordsmith's rhymes into a compact and homogenous "lay". Thus, worked into the poetical setting (as the jeweler mounts his gems to enhance their value and ensure their preservation), they passed as heirlooms from generation to generation, floating on the oral tradition of the people.

There are therefore many facets to this saga and, in part at least, its purpose was to "explore such social and psychological tensions as these in the history of the people of Orkney, and to help them understand themselves through a knowledge of their origins".

== Modern significance ==
The saga is not only of importance to scholars attempting to understand the Viking Age in the islands and their neighbouring lands, it is also plays a significant part in the modern culture of the Northern Isles. The vivid stories of life in Scandinavian Scotland invite the "people of Orkney and Shetland to recognise themselves as the inheritors and custodians of a dual culture, both Norse and Scottish".

== Popular culture ==
Orkneyinga saga served as inspiration for several modern novels, including Eric Linklater's The Men of Ness (1932), George Mackay Brown's Magnus (1973), and Linnea Hartsuyker's The Golden Wolf Saga, a trilogy consisting of The Half-Drowned King (2017), The Sea Queen (2018), and The Golden Wolf (2019).
