= Petty kingdoms of Norway =

Entities from which the later Kingdom of Norway was founded

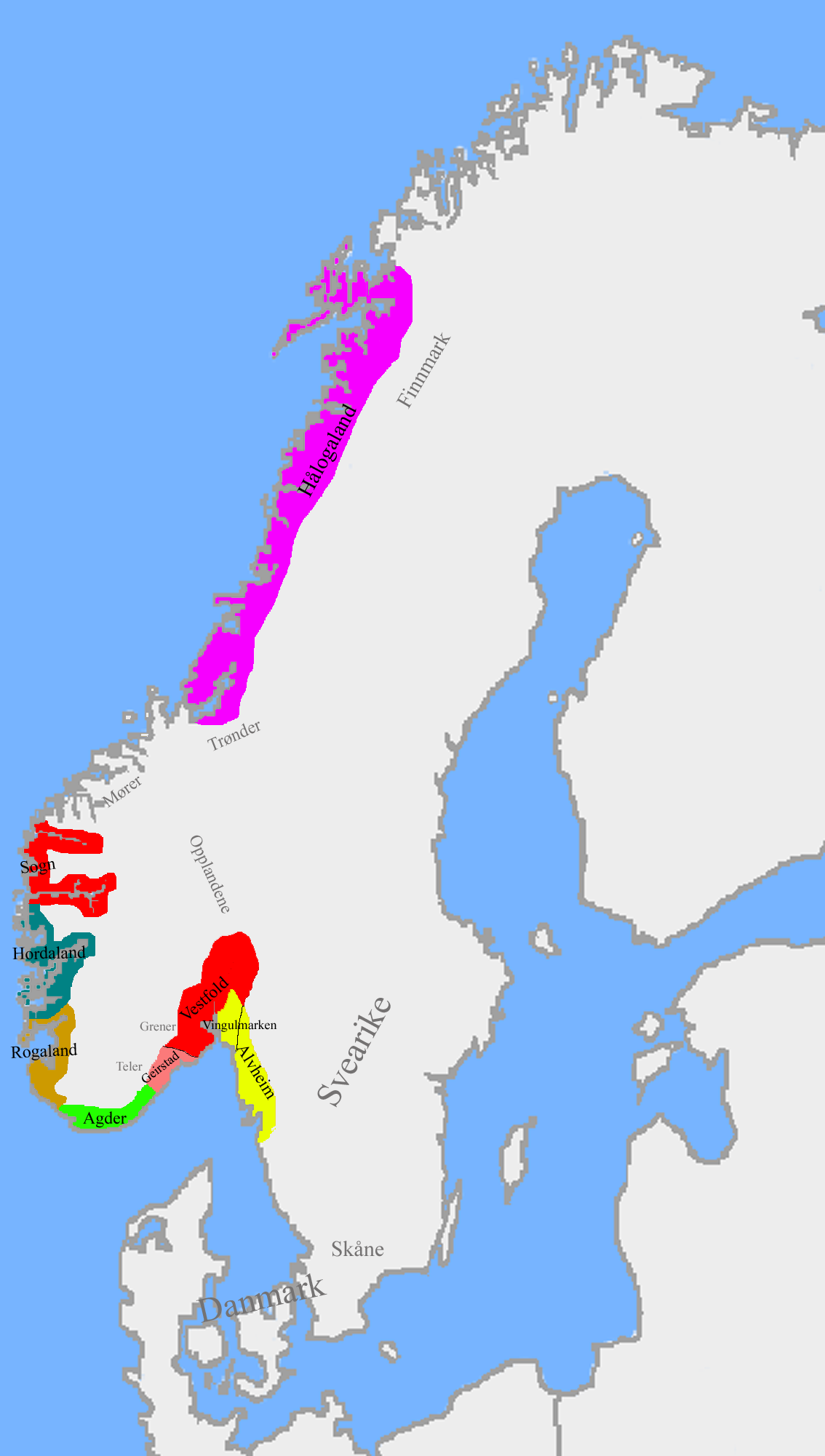
Some of the major petty kingdoms of Norway about 860.

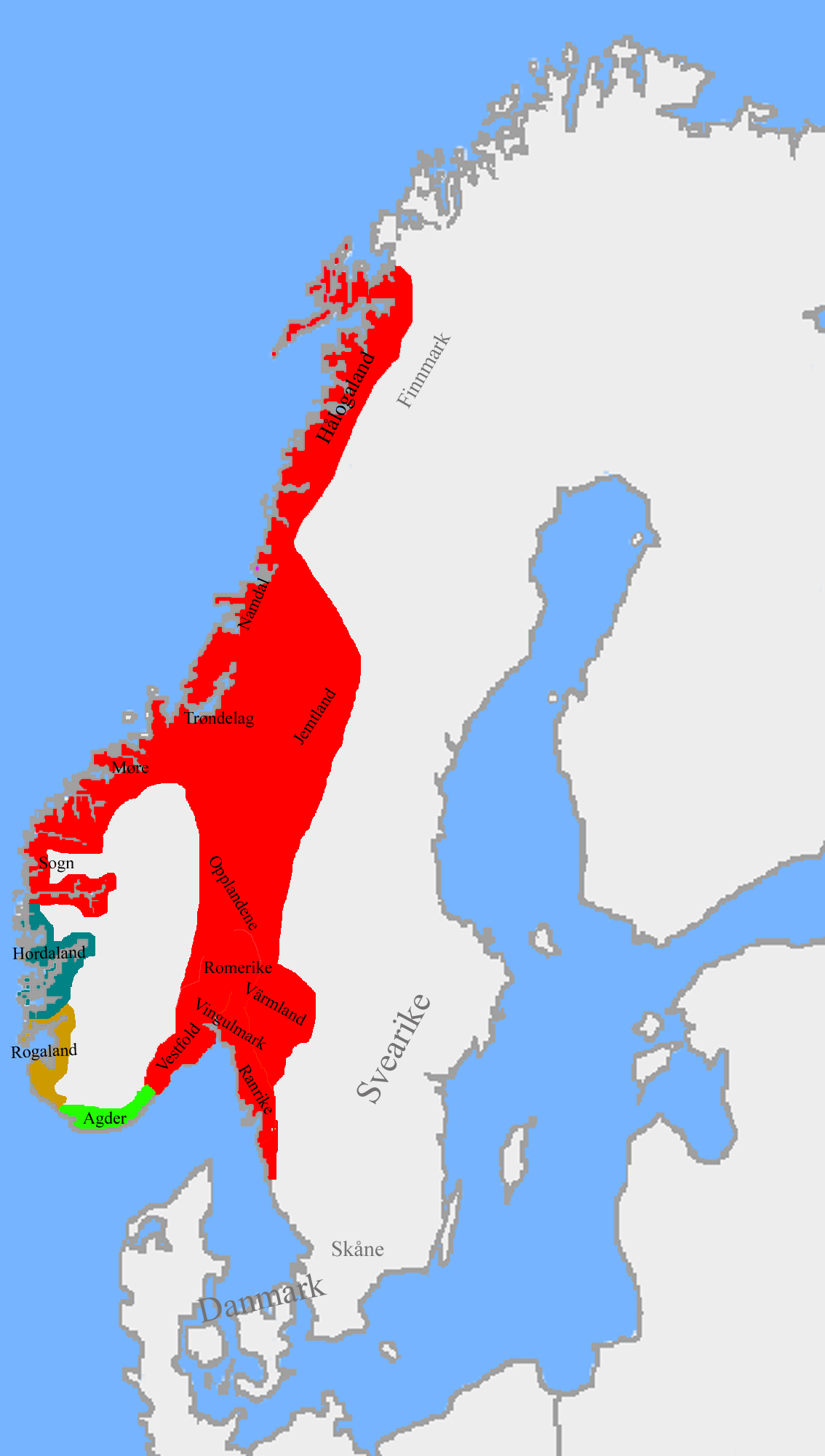
Petty kingdoms of Norway c. 872

The petty kingdoms of Norway (Bokmål: smårike) were the entities from which the later Kingdom of Norway was founded. Before the unification of Norway in 872 and during the period of fragmentation after King Harald Fairhair's death, Norway was divided in several small kingdoms. Some could have been as small as a cluster of villages, and others comprised several of today's counties.

By the time of the first historical records of Scandinavia, about the 8th century, a number of small political entities existed in Norway. The exact number is unknown, and would probably also fluctuate with time. It has been estimated that there were 9 petty realms in Western Norway during the early Viking Age. Archaeologist Bergljot Solberg on this basis estimates that there would have been at least 20 in the whole country.

There are no written sources from this time to tell us the title used by these rulers, or the exact borders between their realms. The main written sources we have on this period, the kings' sagas, were not written until the 12th and 13th centuries. While they were in part based on skaldic poems, and possibly on oral tradition, their reliability as sources for detailed events of the Viking Age continues to be debated among historians. The sagas, most notable of which is Heimskringla, often refer to the petty rulers as konungr, i.e. king, as in Agder, Alvheim, Hedmark, Hordaland, Nordmøre og Romsdal, Rogaland, Romerike, Sogn, Solør, Sunmmøre, Trøndelag, Vestfold (which at various times included several of the aforementioned) and Viken; however in Hålogaland the title was jarl, i.e. earl (compared with Count in the Norse sources, as well as German Gräf), later Ladejarl (from the rulers power base at Lade, in modern-day Trondheim). The rulers of all the areas might be called petty kings, herser, subkings, kings or earls depending on the source. A number of small communities were gradually organised into larger regions in the 9th century, and in AD 872, according to the legend, Harald Fairhair unified the realm and became its first supreme ruler. Many of the former kingdoms would later become earldoms under the Norwegian high king and some would try to break free again.

Below follows an incomplete list of petty kingdoms of Norway and their known rulers. Most of the people mentioned in this list are legendary or semi-legendary. Some of the areas might have a contested status as petty kingdoms.

== List of petty kingdoms and earldoms ==
=== Kingdom of Agder ===
Rulers:

Legendary (from Gautreks saga)

- Harald the Agder-King (legendary)
- Víkar (Harald Agder-king's son)
- Harald Vikarson (Son of Vikar)
- Bjæring, possibly only a chief (local legend from Hægebostad Municipality)
- Vigbrands fra Agder – c. 690
- Herbrand Vigbrandsson
- Kissa
- Kjotve the Rich

Kings from 790 to 987

- Harald Granraude, 7??–815, father of Åsa
- Åsa Haraldsdottir of Agder, between 815 and 834–838, mother of Halfdan the Black
- Halfdan the Black, father of Harald Fairhair, from 838.
- Kjotve the Rich, late 9th century
- Harald Grenske, 976–987

=== Kingdom of Fjordane ===
Might also be called Firda or Firdafylke.

Rulers: Olaf brother of Anund Yngling

- Frøybjørn
- Audbjørn
- Vemund Kamban
- Håkon Grjotgardsson

=== Kingdom of Gudbrandsdalen ===
Rulers:

- Dale-Gudbrand

=== Kingdom of Hadeland ===
Rulers:

- Höd
- Halfdan Hvitbeinn

=== Kingdom of Hedmark ===
Rulers:

- Halfdan Hvitbeinn
- Sigtryg Eysteinsson
- Eystein Eysteinsson, brother of Sigtryg
- Halfdan the Black, was king of half of Hedmark after defeating rulers Sigtryg and his brother, Eystein.

=== Kingdom of Hordaland/Hardanger ===
Rulers:

- Hunþjófr Friðþjófsson
- Herþjófr Hunþjófsson (From Gautreks saga),
- Alrekr Eiriksson early 600s
- Hrólfr or Bergi Svåsason
- Sǫlvi Hrólfson
- Kaun Sǫlvason
- Haraldr Víkarsson
- Eirik King of Hordaland late 800s, nephew of Haraldr, son of Vatnarr

=== Kingdom of Hålogaland ===
Rulers:

- Saeming (legendary son of Odin)
- Thrand (son of Saeming)
- Gudlog 480s?
- Eystein
- Halfdan
- Håkon Grjotgardsson

=== Earldom of Lade ===
Rulers:

- Hákon Grjótgarðsson, an ally of Harald Fairhair, first Earl of Lade in about: c. 860–870 – c. 900–920 AD
- Sigurðr Hákonarson, friend and advisor of Hákon the Good
- Hákon Sigurðarson, ruler of Norway from about 975 to 995
- Eiríkr Hákonarson, governor of the majority of Norway under Svein Forkbeard
- Sveinn Hákonarson, governor of a part of Norway under Olaf the Swede
- Hákon Eiríksson, governor of Norway under Canute the Great

=== Kingdom of Namdalen ===
Rulers:

- Thorkel of Namdalen

=== Earldom of Nordmøre ===
Rulers:

- Rognvald Eysteinsson ? - c. 892
- Thorir Rögnvaldarson c. 892 - c. 935

=== Kingdom of Oppland ===
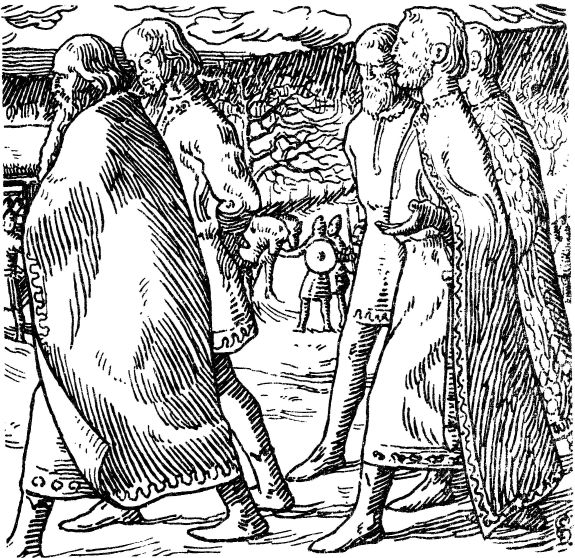
The kings of Oppland go to hold council.

Rulers:

- Eystein, father of Åsa who married Halfdan Hvitbeinn (see Ynglinga Saga, paragraph 49)
- Halfdan "the Aged" Sveidasson (c. 750)
- Ivar Halfdansson (c. 770)
- Eystein "Glumra (the Noisy)" Ivarsson, son-in-law of Ragnvald Heidumhære and father of Ragnvald Eysteinsson (788)

=== Kingdom of Orkdalen ===
Rulers:

- Gryting ?–c. 870

=== Kingdom of Ranrike ===
Rulers:

- Tryggve Olafsson ?–963 AD

=== Kingdom of Raumarike ===
Rulers:

- Sigurd Hring 8th century
- Ragnar Lodbrok 8th century
- Halfdan Hvitbeinn
- Eystein Halfdansson Son of Halfdan
- Halfdan the Mild Son of Eystein
- Gudrød the Hunter Son of Halfdan
- Sigtryg Eysteinsson
- Halfdan the Black Son of Gudrød

=== Kingdom of Ringerike ===
Rulers:

- Raum the Old
- Halfdan the Old
- Sigurd Syr

=== Kingdom of Rogaland ===
Rulers:

- Gard
- Rugalf Gardsson
- Ogvald Rugalfsson mid 6th century (from Hálfs saga ok Hálfsrekka)
- Ingjald Ogvaldsson fl. c. 600
- Jossur Ingjaldsson fl mid 7th century
- Hjor Jossurasson fl. 8th century
- Hjorleif Hjorsson the Fornicator fl. mid-late 8th century
- Halfur Hjorleifsson
- Hjor Halfsson ? –c. 870s
- Sulke ? –870
- Geirmundur Hjorarsson

=== Kingdom of Romsdal ===
Rulers:

- Raum the Old legendary
- Jötunbjörn the Old son of Raum
- Raum
- Hrossbjörn
- Orm Broken-shell
- Knatti
- Thórolf and Ketill Raum (in one version, Thórolf and Ketill Raum are sons of Orm).

=== Kingdom of Sogn ===
Rulers:

- King Harald Gullskjegg (translate: Harald the Goldbeard): 770–850 AD (according to Fagrskinna and Heimskringla )

=== Kingdom of Solør ===
Rulers:

- Halfdan Hvitbeinn

=== Kingdom of Telemark ===
The status of Telemark as a kingdom has been contested by some historians.

rulers or figures:

- Geirthjof of Oppland (First battle of Telemark)
- Fridthjof (Second battle of Telemark)

=== Kingdom of Toten ===
Rulers:

- Halfdan Hvitbeinn

=== Kingdom of Trøndelag ===
Rulers:

- Håkon Grjotgardsson

=== Kingdom of Vestfold ===
Rulers:

- (Sigtryg of Vetteland)
- Eirik Sigtrygsson
- Agnar Eiriksson
- Eirik Agnarsson
- Halfdan Hvitbeinn (part of Vestfold)
- Eystein Halfdansson Eriks son in law
- Halfdan the Mild Eysteins son
- Gudrød the Hunter Son of Halfdan
- Halfdan the Black Ruled half the kingdom. Son of Gudrød.
- Olaf Gudrødsson Ruled half the kingdom. Son of Gudrød.
- Ragnvald Heidumhære
- Bjørn Farmann
- Olaf Haraldsson Geirstadalf, brother of Bjørn
- Harald Gudrødsson Grenske, 976–987

=== Kingdom of Vestmar ===
Rulers:

- Dag the mild

=== Kingdom of Vingulmark ===
Vingulmark is the old name for the area which today makes up the counties of Østfold and Akershus, and included the site of Norway's capital, Oslo, which had not been founded at this time. Archaeologists have made finds of richly endowed burials in the area around the estuary of the river Glomma, at Onsøy, Rolvsøy and Tune, where the remains of a ship, the Tune ship, was found. This indicates that there was a center of power in this area.

There are indications that at least the southern part of this area was under Danish rule in the late 9th century. In the account of Ottar, which was written down at the court of the English king Alfred the Great, Ottar says that when he sailed south from Skiringssal, he had Denmark on the port side for three days.

Rulers:

- Gudrød the Hunter, half of Vingulmark
- Alfgeir (Old Norse: Álfgeir)
- Gandalf Alfgeirsson
- Halfdan the Black Son of Gudrød
- Olaf Haraldsson
- Tryggve Olafsson
- Harald Gudrødsson Grenske, 976–987
- Svein Alfivuson, 1030–1035

=== Kingdom of Viken ===
Rulers:

- Sigurd Snake-in-the-Eye

=== Kingdom of Voss (Vörs) ===
Rulers:

- Skilfir
- Skjöld
- Eirík
- Alrek( from Hálfs saga ok Hálfsrekka)
- Víkar ( from Hálfs saga ok Hálfsrekka)
- Vatnar ( from Hálfs saga ok Hálfsrekka)
- Ímald and Eirík

== See also ==
- Unification of Norway
- Districts of Norway
