= Gudrød the Hunter =

Legendary early 9th century Norwegian petty king

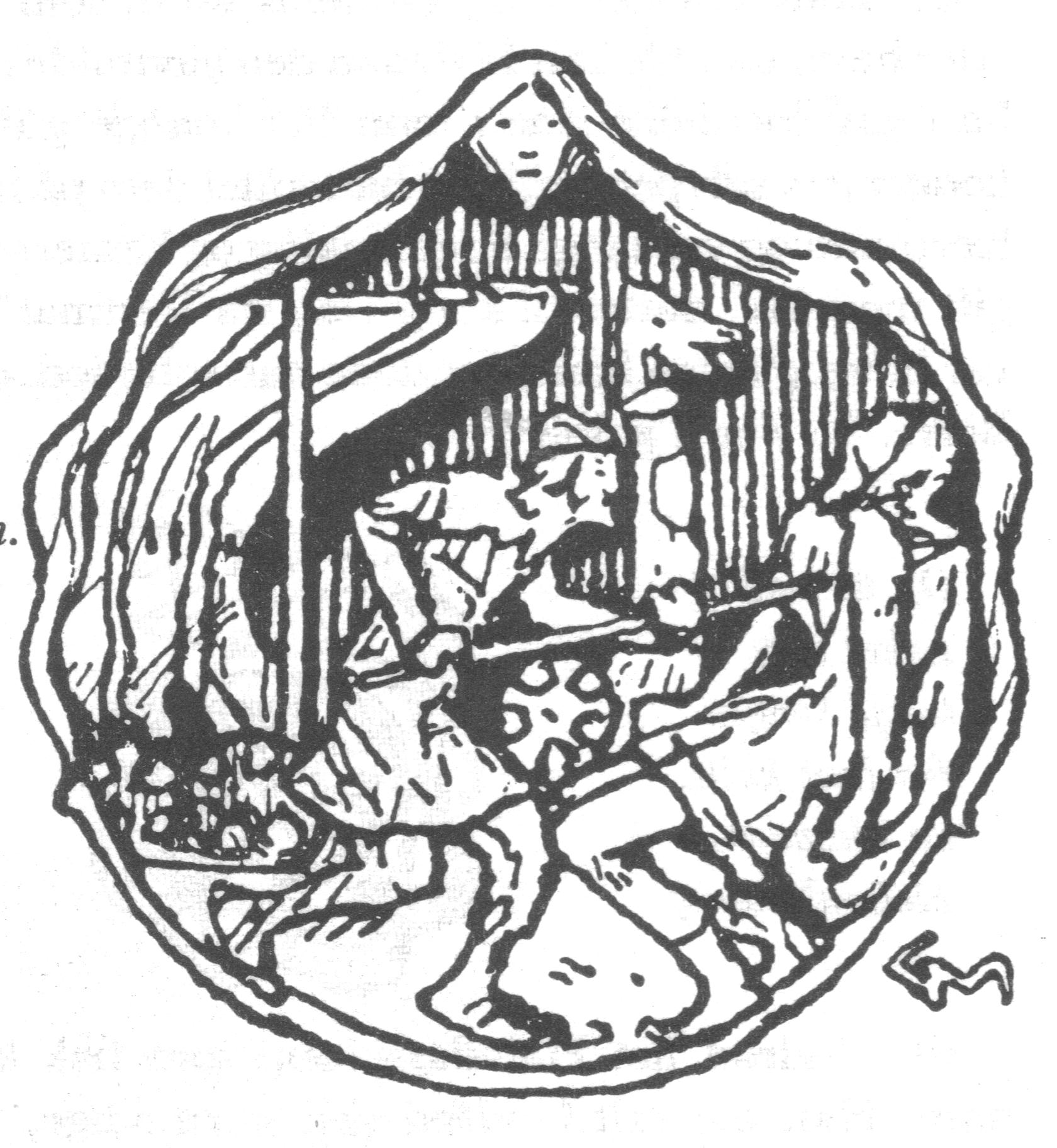
Gudrød is murdered. Illustration by Gerhard Munthe.

Gudrød the Hunter (Old Norse: Guðrøðr veiðikonungr, Norwegian: Gudrød Veidekonge, literally Gudrod Hunter-king; died 820 AD), also known as Gudrød the Magnificent (Old Norse: enn gǫfugláti, Norwegian: den gjeve), is a legendary character portrayed in the Norse sagas as a Norwegian petty king in the early 9th century. According to the sagas, he was the father of Halfdan the Black, and thus the grandfather of Harald Fairhair, the first king of unified Norway. He is considered by modern historians to be of a more mythical nature than other ancestors of Harald and Halfdan, and he can not be identified historically. Historians have in turn made a number of proposals seeking to identify him with various would-be contemporary historical figures.

== Background ==
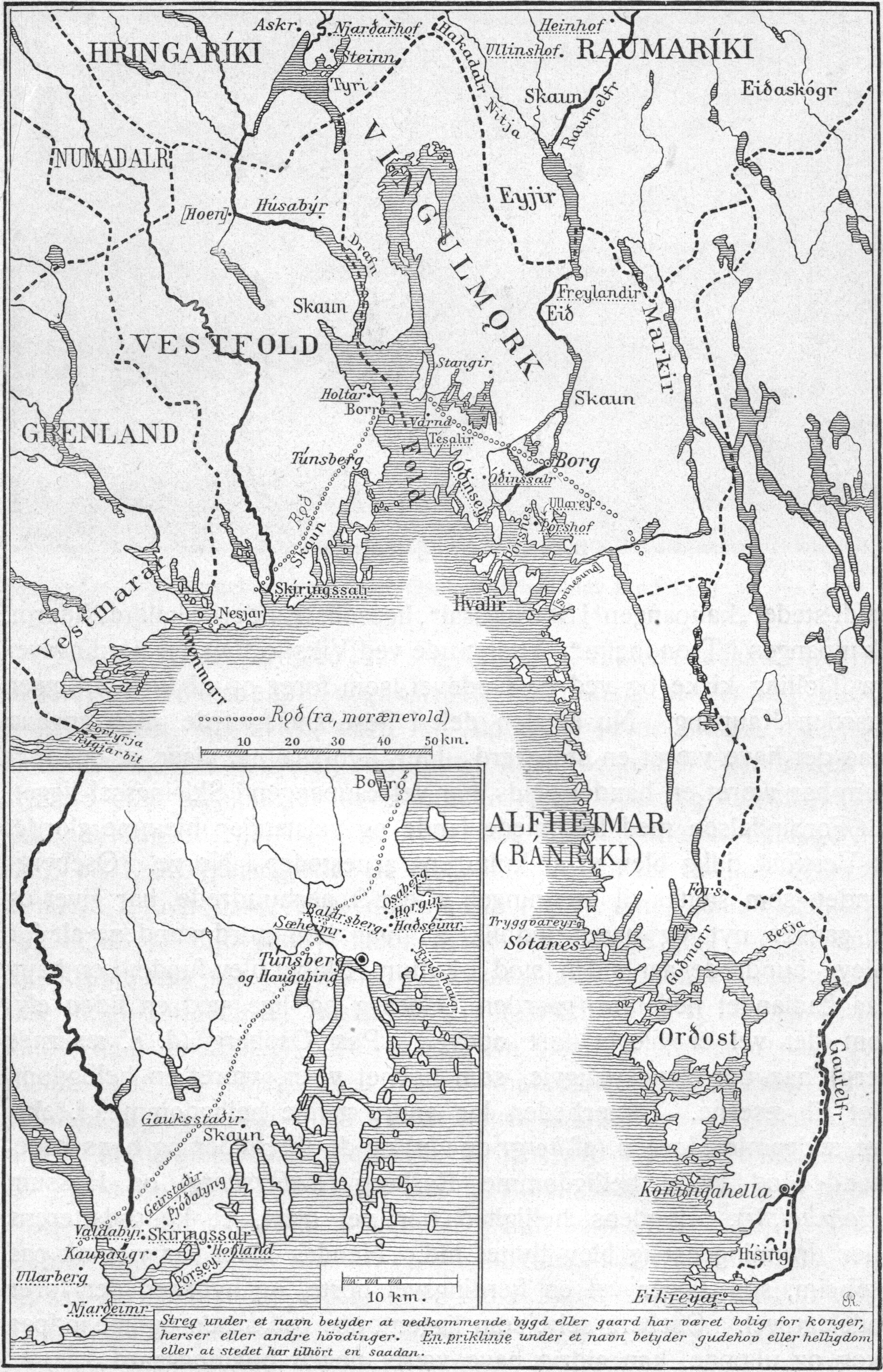
Map of contemporary south-eastern Norway (Viken), showing locations mentioned in the article.

Gudrød was a member of the House of Yngling. He was the son of Halfdan the Mild, king of Romerike and Vestfold, and Liv, daughter of King Dag of Vestmar.

Gudrød is mentioned in the skaldic poem Ynglingatal, and Snorri Sturluson elaborates on Gudrød's story in Heimskringla. According to Snorri, Gudrød was called both "the Magnificent" and "the Hunter", while Ynglingatal only refers to him as "the Magnificent".

== Legend ==
While Gudrød is portrayed as a king in Uppland in some older texts, Snorri writes that his royal estates are in Vestfold. The term Kings of Uppland possibly refers to the great Thing of Kings in Uppsala in Uppland, comprising the Commonwealth of Sweden, encompassing both Danes, Finns, Norse, Vends and more. High King Gudrød first married Alfhild, a daughter of Alfarin, king of Alfheim (now Bohuslän). Gudrød inherited half the province of Vingulmark. They had a son, Olaf Geirstad-Alf. When Alfhild died, Gudrød sent his men to the king of Agder, Harald Granraude, to propose a marriage with his daughter Åsa. When Harald declined, Gudrød decided to take Åsa by force. They arrived at night. When Harald realised that he was being attacked, he assembled his men and fought well, but died together with his son Gyrd. Gudrød thereafter captured Åsa and married her. They had the son Halfdan the Black.

== Ancestry ==
Ancestors of Gudrød the Hunter

8. Halfdan Hvitbeinn
4. Eystein Halfdansson
9. Åsa Eysteinsdotter
2. Halfdan the Mild
10. Eirik Agnarsson, king of Vestfold
5. Hild Eiriksdotter of Vestfold
1. Gudrød the Hunter
6. Dag of Vestmar
3. Liv Dagsdotter

== Other sources ==
- Krag, C. Ynglingatal og Ynglingesaga: en studie i historiske kilder (Oslo 1991)
- Salvesen, A., transl. Norges historie; Historia Norvegiae (Oslo 1978)

Preceded by Halfdan the Mild	Head of the House of Yngling	Succeeded by Olaf Geirstad-Alf
