= Gudrød Bjørnsson =

Norwegian petty king

Gudrød Bjørnsson was, in late tradition, the son of Bjørn Farmann, the king of Vestfold, and a grandson of Harald Fairhair. These traditions make Gudrød the father of Harald Grenske, and the paternal grandfather of Saint Olaf, but modern scholars have suggested this pedigree was fabricated to link Saint Olaf to Harald Fairhair.

After Gudrød's father had been killed by Eric Bloodaxe, he lived with his uncle Olaf Haraldsson Geirstadalf, the king of Vingulmark. Olaf rebelled against Bloodaxe, but was killed in battle, and so Gudrød had to escape to Oppland.

When Haakon the Good became king, Gudrød was given Vestfold, his father's kingdom, as a fief.

Gudrød was slain in the vicinity of Tønsberg, by Harald Greyhide, who feared a rebellion from his subordinate kings.
