= Gåten Ragnarok =

- Directed by: Mikkel Brænne Sandemose
- Screenplay by: John Kåre Raake
- Produced by: Martin Sundland; Are Heidenstrom
- Starring: Pål Sverre Hagen; Nicolai Cleve Broch; Sofia Helin; Bjørn Sundquist; Maria Annette Tanderø Berglyd; Julian Rasmussen Podolski
- Cinematography: Daniel Voldheim
- Edited by: Christian Siebenherz
- Music by: Magnus Beite
- Production company: Fantefilm
- Distributed by: Nordisk Film
- Release dates: 30 August 2013 (Norway); 15 August 2014 (United States)
- Running time: 100 minutes
- Country: Norway
- Languages: Norwegian; Swedish

Gåten Ragnarok (lit. "The Riddle Ragnarok") or just simply Ragnarok is a 2013 Norwegian fantasy adventure film about the legendary story of Ragnarök.

Archaeologist Sigurd Swenson sets off to Finnmark in search of new physical evidence of Vikings' explorations in the far northern regions of Norway. His expedition with two colleagues and his two children becomes an exploration of Ragnarok, the end of the world in Norse mythology - and the "no man's land" between Norway and Russia, where no one has set foot for ages. The urgent exploration disturbs the ancient site, providing unexpected answers to the mysteries within.

== Plot ==
Sigurd is an archaeologist studying the ancient Norse people known as the Vikings, continuing work that he and his wife had pursued together before her death five years earlier. Now raising their two children alone, he is also facing friction at work around funding and support. His work up to this point - centering on aspects of the Oseberg Ship - has exhausted all of the available physical evidence. A meeting with funders in the Viking Ship Museum in Oslo intended to increase support for ambitious fieldwork that isn't well substantiated in Finnmark ends badly. However, his enthusiasm is undimmed, partially out of loyalty to his wife. He refers often to a notebook she kept, filled with maps, drawings, and rune symbols related to the Norse culture.

A breakthrough takes place when his co-worker Allan brings to him a stone tablet he found in Finnmark - the particular area in Northern Norway they've been focusing on. They determine that it holds a code, and identify an empty space in the center of the stone as exactly fitting a remnant from the ship. After they retrieve the ship remnant from the museum, they're able to break the code enough to translate most of the runic symbols on it and interpret it as a map of an island in a lake which may hold extensive relics and/or treasure. He decides to start his kids' (Ragnhild and Brage) summer vacation with them up in that area - doing on a smaller scale the work that they had been pursuing, with Allan and a small crew from the region.

When Sigurd and Allan in Finnmark they meet up with Allan's field partner Elisabeth and hired guide Leif and set off hiking, eventually cutting an opening in a WWII-era fence erected by the Russians filled with signage warning against entering. As they continue and Sigurd and Allan attempt to retrace the ancient journey, Leif brings them to the only lake for miles around, which surrounds a small island - identified as the "Eye of Odin". They are able to get across the water by means of a makeshift raft and oars, and they start to search for metal remnants. Exploring farther, Ragnhild finds a Russian barracks and Brage finds an immense cave.

The party all descends via ropes into the cave and easily find a Vikings helmet and other objects. Brage finds an interesting ovoid object in the shallow water and stows it in his rucksack for later. The group's excitement is cut short when Leif demands the pieces at gunpoint and leaves, stranding the rest of the group in the cave. As he is paddling back across the lake in the raft he gets taken from below by an unseen thing. Elisabeth climbs up the cave wall just using the crevices in the rock, and re-establishes the ropes so the others can climb out. Ragnhild asks Sigurd about the notebook and what is going on, and Sigurd explains that they think the King's daughter Åsa left the message on the stone about the events that took place here.

While Elisabeth, Brage and Ragnhild sleep in the bunker she found, Sigurd and Allan decide not to give up, and to go back in the cave alone. They discover mass graves - not only of ancient skeletons but also including a Russian soldier - and realize that the stone tablet was not in fact a map but a warning, written by Åsa, who refused to take part in her father's attempt to kill the still-living creature. The creature appears out of the water - a huge pebble-skinned sea serpent - reminiscent of the dragon heads of Viking ships. Sigurd understands the last bits of the message that had not made sense before - it was this creature that was being described.

Meanwhile, Brage's "rock" is shown to be a hatching egg, from which emerges a baby serpent. Elisabeth manages to capture it in an old metal box and latch it in. The infant animal's squeals transmit down the bunker's cable into the water and alert an adult serpent who hauls the bunker into the lake, trying to rescue the baby. Elisabeth and the children barely escape with everyone's efforts, inadvertently keeping the box with the baby creature with them.

Allan finds the box as he gathers tools for their escape from the island, figures out how momentous it would be to bring it back alive, and decides to try and secretly keep it while they escape. Elisabeth shoots a zipline across the water to the mainland, and they take turns crossing it. They barely escape another serpent attack by Allan shooting it in the eye. They find that the serpents are not exclusively water bound as they continue to attack the group, barely escaping back into the underground Russian bunker system. They find a ceiling door out and Allan is first through the door, but then demands that the box be handed up to him before he passes down the rope. Sigurd, horrified, tries to argue but is complying when the serpent bursts from the background and takes Allan, then crashes down into the bunker tunnels. The children, who were farther from the ceiling opening, run out of sight, but Elisabeth and Sigurd are knocked out cold.

As the serpent eventually corners Sigurd's children, he comes to and realizes that returning the baby serpent will end the danger. The sound of the baby's squeals distracts the adult serpent from the children and it accepts the infant serpent from Sigurd, slithering off without further harm. The remaining party of four follow in Åsa's footsteps, leaving the serpent(s) and the newborn creature in peace.

== Cast ==
- Pål Sverre Hagen as archaeologist Sigurd Svensen
- Nicolai Cleve Broch as archaeologist Allan
- Sofia Helin as Elisabeth
- Bjørn Sundquist as the tour guide Leif
- Maria Annette Tanderø Berglyd as Sigurd’s daughter Ragnhild
- Julian Rasmussen Podolski as Sigurd’s son Brage
- Terje Strømdahl as Henriksen, the museum director
- Kyrre Haughen Syndess as "sponsor CEO", funds Henriksen's Oseberg Ship research
- Marika Enstand as "sponsor woman"
- Tom Aksel Mathisen as "sponsor man"
- Jens Hultén as "Viking king", implied to be Harald Granraude
- Vera Rudi as Åsa

== Production ==
Gåten Ragnarok was produced by Fantefilm.

== Release ==
The film was released in Norway on the 8 October 2013. Magnolia Pictures acquired the distribution rights for North America, which already has experience in distributing Norwegian films in the Americas as they distributed the 2011 film Head Hunters. It was issued in the United States on 15 August 2014, rated PG-13. It was released to video on 18 November of that year.

=== Critical response ===
After a screening at Fantastic Fest the film was received positively.

The website Twitch Film said: "It adds up to a fun family adventure, with Norwegian style and a welcome edge, something even Indiana Jones in his prime could never quite achieve".
