= Olaf of Norway =

Olaf of Norway – Norwegian: Olav - may refer to:

- Olaf Haraldsson Geirstadalf, reputed son of Harald Fairhair
- Olaf I of Norway, Olaf Tryggvason, (reigned 995–1000)
- Olaf II of Norway, Olaf the Saint, (reigned 1015–1028)
- Olaf III of Norway, Olaf Kyrre, (reigned 1067–1093)
- Olaf Magnusson of Norway, (reigned 1103–1115)
- Olav Ugjæva (died 1169), anti-king against Magnus V of Norway
- Olaf IV of Norway, Olaf Haakonsson, also Olaf II of Denmark, (reigned 1380–1387)
- Olaf V of Norway, (reigned 1957–1991)
