= Þáttr Ólafs Geirstaða Alfs =

"Þáttr Óláfs Geirstaða Alfs" is a þáttr , a short anecdotal story, about the semi-legendary Norse king Olaf Geirstad-Alf. It is preserved in Flateyjarbók, a saga collection that was written at the end of the 14th century. Olaf Geirstad Alf, who is also one of the kings who appear in the poem Ynglingatal, is said to have been king of Vestfold or Grenland in Norway in the late 9th century.

== Content ==
"Þáttr Óláfs Geirstaða Alfs" consists of four short chapters. The first is about Olaf's family background and the farm of Geirstad where he reportedly lived. A verse from Ynglingatal is also reproduced here. The second chapter is about Olaf's dream. The author recounts that Olaf called a thing on his farm to tell people about a dream he had had, in which a black bull that came through the country, killing a lot of people, and at last it killed Olaf's hird. Olaf thought that this dream was a warning of disease and famine coming. He therefore asked the people at the thing to make a great mound, where they could bury him after his death. Everything happened as Olaf had said: sickness and mass death happened, and his hird died and finally himself, and he was buried in a mound on Geirstad.

The rest of the þáttr is about a man named Hrani, a foster brother of Harald Grenske, who was the father of St. Olaf. The events are supposed to have happened during the reign of Olaf Tryggvasson (ca. 995–1000). Hrani had a dream where Olaf Geirstad-Alf came to him and told him that he should break into the mound and find a sword, a belt and a ring; he should bring these to a farm in Grenland in Viken, where Harald Grenske's wife, Åsta Gudbrandsdatter, was giving birth. Hrani was told that he should put the belt on Åsta to ease her labour. The sword and ring he should give to the newborn boy, and he should name him Olaf after Olaf Geirstad-Alf. The last chapter is about how Hrani carried out the instructions he had received in the dream: he broke into the mound, took out the three objects and went to the farm where his foster brother Harald and Åsta lived. When Hrani laid the belt on Asta, the child was delivered. This boy later became Saint Olaf.

== Sources ==
- Þáttr Ólafs Geirstaða Alfs. In: Fornmanna sögur, Volume I. Copenhagen: Royal Nordic Society of Antiquaries, 1835
