= Grasmoen =

Settlement in Aurskog-Høland Municipality, Norway

- Farms
- Interactive map of Grasmoen
- Location within Akershus Location within Norway
- Coordinates: 59.8735°N 11.79829°E
- Country: Norway
- Region: Eastern Norway
- County: Akershus
- District: Romerike
- Municipality: Aurskog-Høland Municipality
- Elevation: 232 m (761 ft)
- Time zone: UTC+01:00 (CET)
  - Summer (DST): UTC+02:00 (CEST)
- Post Code: 1954 Setskog

Grasmoen is a small settlement in Aurskog-Høland Municipality in Akershus county, Norway.

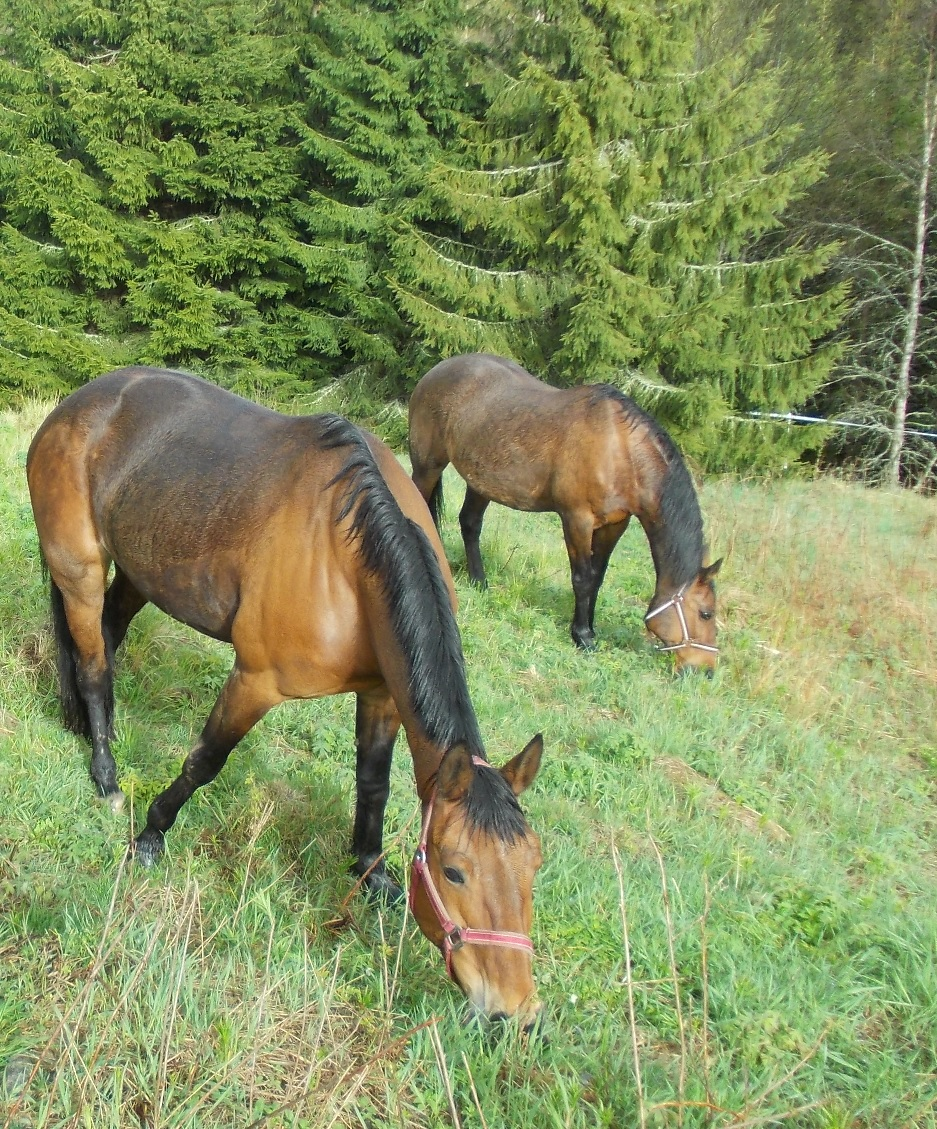
Standardbred mares at Grasmoen (2014).

Grasmoen is 70km (44 mi) east of the Norwegian capital of Oslo. The settlement is located about 6 kilometres (3.7 mi) northeast of the village of Setskog, about 13 kilometres (8.1 mi) southwest of the village of Vestmarka (in Eidskog Municipality), and about 4 kilometres (2.5 mi) east of the border with Sweden. It is currently inhabited by 6-7 families on different sites.

== History ==
The first registered settlement on Grasmoen was in the early 17th century, primarily on two farms, Grasmoen and Grasmo Vestre. Grasmo Vestre is the original settlement, and records shows the earliest settlement was as a makeshift summer farm.

One known veteran of the Scandinavian Seven Years' War (1807–14), came from Grasmo and participated in the Battle of Skotterud in 1814.

The farms ceased operations in the early 1970s, and some farm areas was mainly used for horses until recently.

== Grasmobanen ==
Grasmobanen was a 1,460-metre (4,790 ft) long horse-drawn railroad that was in operations from 1849-1938, part of the Soot Canal constructed by Engebret Soot. In 1871, over 72,000 logs were transported on the railroad. In 1918, the railroad shifted from being horse-drawn, to a steam-engine pulling the timber-wagons with wires. Already in 1920, the steam engine was replaced with a gasoline engine. The engine is still visible on the high end of the railroad at Tvillingtjern and is protected by the municipality due to its historical value. Further protection and restorations is planned with co-operation of Aurskog-Høland Municipality and the neighboring Eidskog Municipality.

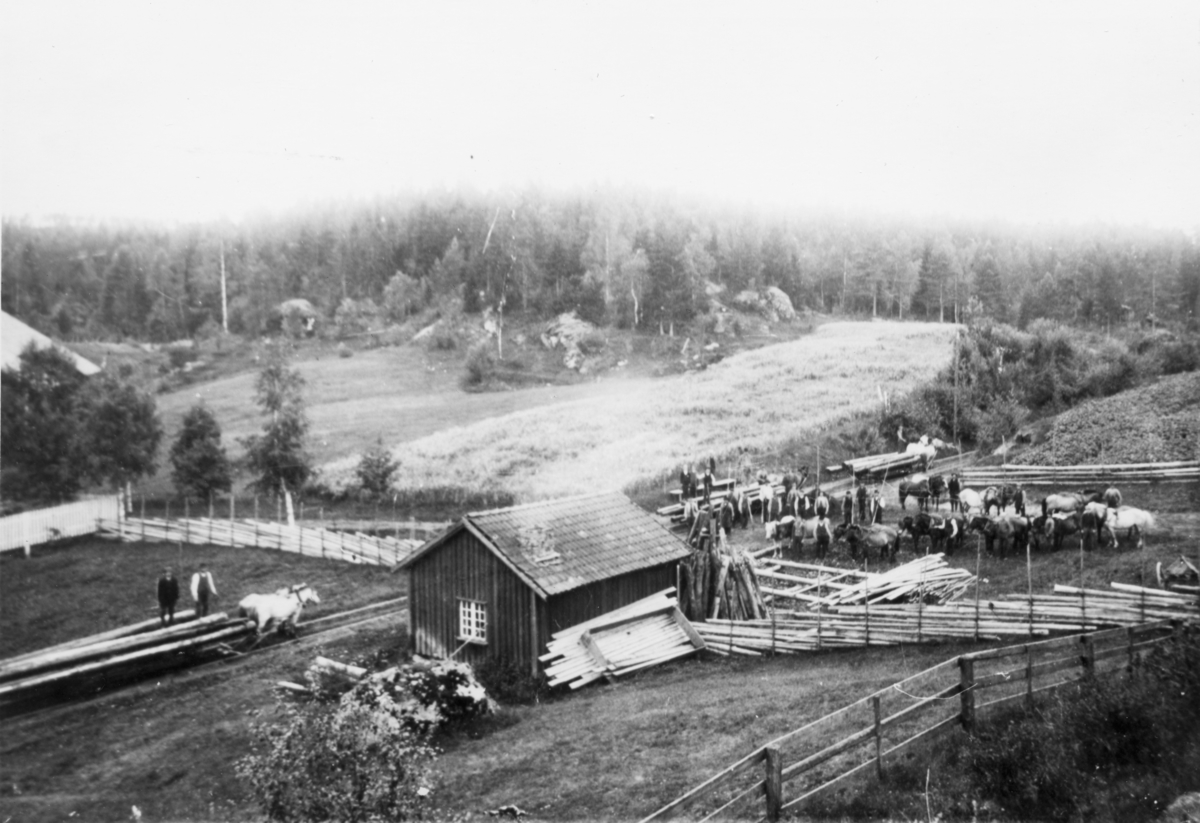
Rest and shifting place about midway on Grasmobanen. Date unknown, probably around 1910.

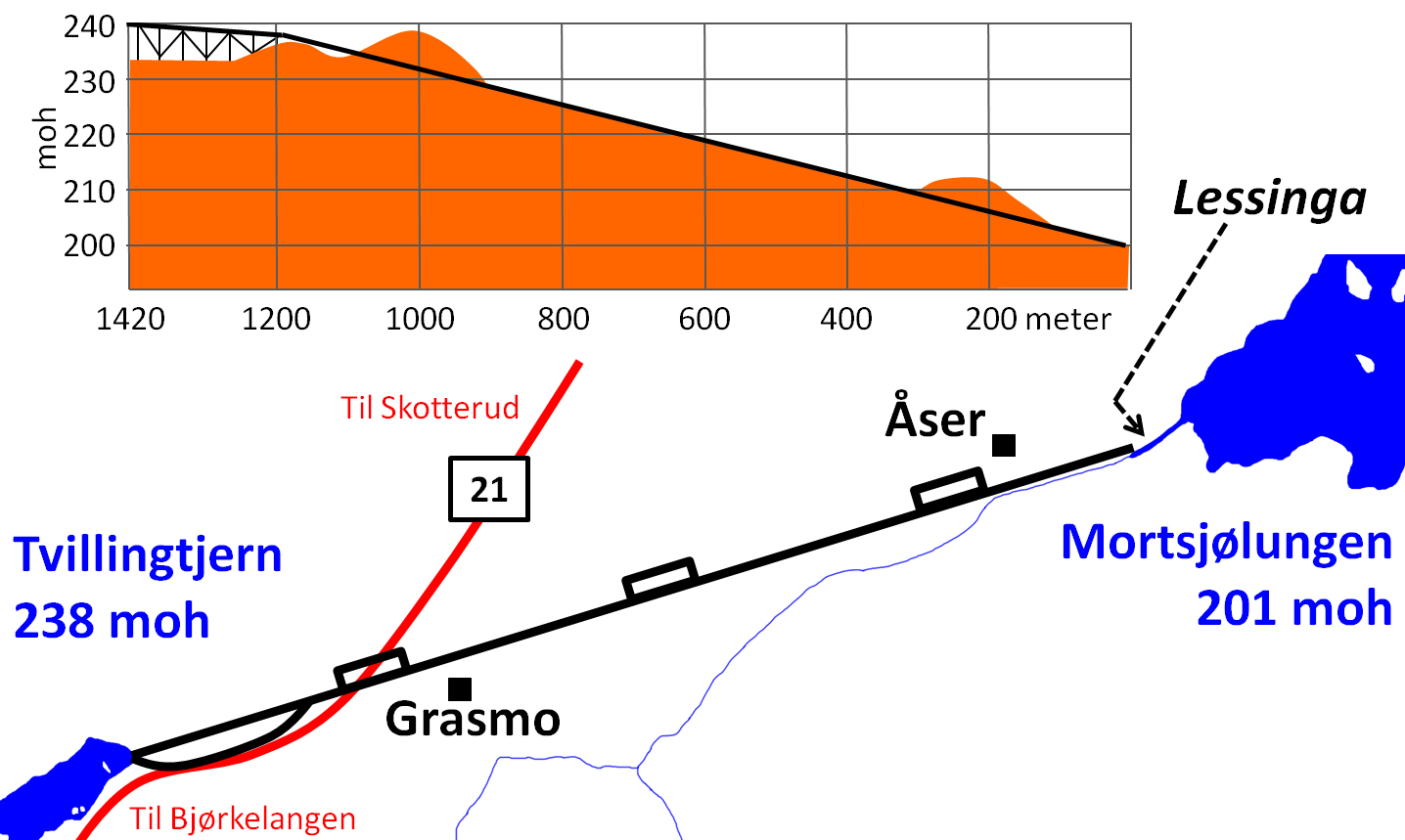
Map of the Grasmobanen railroad.
