= Olaf III (disambiguation) =

Olaf III of Norway was King 1067–1093.

Olaf III may also refer to:

- Olaf Guthfrithson, King of Dublin 934–939
- Olof Skötkonung, King of Sweden 980–1022
- Olaf II of Denmark, sometimes numbered as III when counting a previous anti-king
- Olaf Haraldsson
