= Olaf Guthfrithson (disambiguation) =

The English Olaf Guthfrithson is a form of the Old Norse Óláfr Guðfriðarson. An Anglicised form of the Old Norse name is Olaf Godredsson. The Old Irish form of these names is Amlaíb mac Gofraid. These four names may refer to:

- Olaf Geirstad-Alf, legendary 9th century Norwegian king
- Olaf Guthfrithson (died 941), King of Dublin and York
- Olafr Godredsson (c. 1080–1153), or Olaf Morsel, King of Mann, son of Godred Crovan
- Olaf the Black (1174–1237), or Olaf Godredsson, son of Godred Olafsson of the Isle of Man
