= Eysteinsson =

Eysteinsson is a Scandinavian surname. Notable people with the surname include:

- Halfdan Eysteinsson, the subject of Hálfdanar saga Eysteinssonar, a legendary saga from early 14th century Iceland
- Rognvald Eysteinsson, founder of the Earldom of Orkney in the Norse Sagas
- Sigtryg Eysteinsson, king of the Norwegian petty kingdoms Raumarike and Hedmark in the 9th century
- Sigurd Eysteinsson (a.k.a. Sigurd the Mighty, ruled circa 875–892), the second Viking Earl of Orkney

== See also ==
- Estensan
- Eysteinn
