= Øvre Romerike =

Coordinates: 60°08′59″N 11°01′08″E

Øvre Romerike Nedre Romerike

Øvre Romerike is the upper (northern) half of the traditional Norwegian district Romerike. It consists of the Akershus municipalities Gjerdrum, Nannestad, Eidsvoll, Hurdal, Ullensaker and Nes. The lower (southern) portion is known as Nedre Romerike.
