= Agder County Municipality =

Agder County Municipality Agder fylkeskommune
- County
- Coat of arms

- Location in Norway
- Coordinates: 58.6°N 7.7°E
- Country: Norway
- Administrative center: Kristiansand

Government
  - County mayor: Arne Thomassen
- ISO 3166 code: NO-42
- Budget: 5.5 billion kr
- Employees: 3,000
- Schools: 18
- Pupils: 11,000
- Roads: 4,000 km (2,500 mi)
- Website: agderfk.no

Agder County Municipality (Norwegian: Agder fylkeskommune) is the democratically elected regional governing administration of Agder county in Norway. The administration is based in the city of Kristiansand.

== County government ==
The county municipality's most important tasks include secondary education, recreation (sports and outdoor life), and cultural heritage. The county municipality is also responsible for all county roads (including ferry operations) and public transport (including school busses). The county municipality has further responsibility for regional land-use planning, business development, power production, and environmental management. The county also has responsibility for providing dental health services (in 2002, responsibility for hospitals and public medicine was transferred from the counties to the new regional health authorities).

=== County mayor ===
The county mayor (Norwegian: fylkesordfører) of Agder is the political leader of the county and the chairperson of the county council. Here is a list of people who have held this position:

- 2020–present: Arne Thomassen (H)

=== County council ===
The county council (Norwegian: Fylkestinget) is made up of 49 representatives that are elected by direct election by all legal residents of the county every fourth year. The council is the legislative body for the county. The county council typically meets about six times a year. Council members are divided into standing committees and an executive committee (fylkesutvalg), which meet considerably more often. Both the council and executive committee (with at least 5 members) are led by the county mayor (Norwegian: fylkesordfører). The executive committee carries out the executive functions of the county under the direction of the whole council. The tables below show the current and historical composition of the council by political party.

Agder fylkesting 2023–2027
| Party name (in Norwegian) | Number of representatives |
|---|---|
| Labour Party (Arbeiderpartiet) | 9 |
| Progress Party (Fremskrittspartiet) | 7 |
| Green Party (Miljøpartiet De Grønne) | 1 |
| Conservative Party (Høyre) | 13 |
| Industry and Business Party (Industri‑ og Næringspartiet) | 2 |
| The Conservatives (Konservativt) | 1 |
| Christian Democratic Party (Kristelig Folkeparti) | 6 |
| Pensioners' Party (Pensjonistpartiet) | 1 |
| Red Party (Rødt) | 1 |
| Centre Party (Senterpartiet) | 3 |
| Socialist Left Party (Sosialistisk Venstreparti) | 3 |
| Liberal Party (Venstre) | 2 |
| Total number of members: | 49 |

Agder fylkesting 2020–2023
| Party name (in Norwegian) | Number of representatives |
|---|---|
| Labour Party (Arbeiderpartiet) | 10 |
| Progress Party (Fremskrittspartiet) | 5 |
| Green Party (Miljøpartiet De Grønne) | 3 |
| Conservative Party (Høyre) | 10 |
| The Christians Party (Partiet De Kristne) | 1 |
| Christian Democratic Party (Kristelig Folkeparti) | 6 |
| The Democrats (Demokratene) | 3 |
| Pensioners' Party (Pensjonistpartiet) | 1 |
| Red Party (Rødt) | 1 |
| Centre Party (Senterpartiet) | 5 |
| Socialist Left Party (Sosialistisk Venstreparti) | 2 |
| Liberal Party (Venstre) | 2 |
| Total number of members: | 49 |
