= Raum (king) =

King Raum (Old Norse: Raumr konungr) is the name of at least two legendary kings in Norway. Two related kings named Raum are mentioned in Hversu Noregr byggdist, and one king named Raum is mentioned in Thorsteins saga Víkingssonar. One of the kings in Hversu Noregr byggðist is called Raum the Old (Old Norse: Raumr inn gamli), but it is not explicit whether this refers to the first or second king by that name.

In Thorsteins saga Víkingssonar, Raum is the eponymous ruler of Raumaríki ("Raum's realm", modern day Romerike). In Hversu Noregr byggðist, the elder King Raum is the namesake of Raumsdal ("Raum's dale", modern day Romsdal), an area of land he gave to his son Jötunbjörn. (These two regions are not near each other, Romerike being in the east of Norway north-east of Oslo and Romsdal being in the west of the country.) In both versions, King Raum (specifically the first of the two Raums in Hversu) is also the namesake of Raumelfr ("Raum's river"); while this name is similar to the modern day Rauma, which runs through Romsdal, the name Raumelfr was also used in Old Norse to refer to the river now called the Glomma.

In Old Norse, the word raum or raumr was a partly disparaging term for men who were both large and ugly. According to Thorsteins saga Víkingssonar, this term came to be used because King Raum had been ugly-looking (ljótr). Although no such connection is made between the word raum and the name King Raum in Hversu Noregr byggðist, the word is used to refer to another individual: Ketil Raum, i.e. Ketil the Ugly, the great-great-grandson of the younger King Raum. (Ketil Raum appears in Vatnsdæla saga, where his ancestry is similar to his ancestry in Hversu Noregr byggðist.)

== In Hversu Noregr byggdist ==
Two kings named Raum appear in Hversu Noregr byggdist. The first King Raum is the son of King Nór, the eponymous founder of Norway, who takes control of his father's land. The second is the grandson of the first. There is also mentioned Raum the Old (a cognomen referring to longevity, not precedence), and although it is not explicitly clear from the text which of the Kings Raum it is meant to be (if either), it can be inferred that it is the second.

=== The elder King Raum, son of Nór ===
The first King Raum mentioned in Hversu Noregr byggdist was one of three sons of Nór, the legendary first king of Norway. Nór's wife was Hödda, daughter of the jötun Svaða, but she is only identified as the mother of Nór's other sons, Thrand (Þrándr) and Garð who is called Agði (Garðr agði), the namesakes of Trondheim and Agder.

Raum is first mentioned after the section that introduces Thrand and Garð as the sons of Nór and Hödda. Once Thrand and Garð's inheritances and descendants are listed, the text says that "Raum, son of King Nór, took over his father's realm." Raum's lands included Álfheim, a region bounded by several named rivers.

Raum attended a Yule feast given by Bergfinn, son of Thrym the jötun of Vermá, and bedded Bergfinn's sister Bergdís. Bergdís subsequently bore three sons:

- Björn, aka Jötunbjörn, who was raised by Bergdís (his mother)
- Brand, aka Guðbrand, who was raised by Raum (his father) and given to the gods
- Álf, aka Finnálf, who was fostered by Bergfinn

The descendants of each of these children are then briefly listed.

=== The younger King Raum, son of Jötunbjörn ===
The second King Raum is the grandson of the elder King Raum and Bergdís through their son Jötunbjörn the Old. This younger King Raum is called the father of Hrossbjarn, father of Orm Skeljamola, father of Knatt, father of Thorolf Straw and Ketil Raum. (In Vatnsdæla saga, the ancestry of Ketil Raum is similar to this, naming Jotun-Bjorn, Nes-Bjorn, and Orm Skeljamaul, but it excludes Raum and Knatt.)

=== Raum the Old ===
After the descendants of the elder King Raum are listed (including the descendants of the younger King Raum), the text says that Raum the Old then married Hild, daughter of Guðröð the Old, son of King Sölva, first king of Sóleyjar (perhaps modern day Solør). (King Sölva is also mentioned in passing in Ynglinga saga as the ancestor of Sölveig, wife of Olof Trätälja.) Raum the Old's sons were:

- Guðröð
- Hauk
- Hadding
- Hring.

The descendants of each of these children are briefly listed, with the exception that the lineage of Hauk is replaced by the lineage of Höð (they are likely intended to be the same individual under different names).

Neither King Raum mentioned so far is explicitly identified as Raum the Old, and both of them have their own identified sets of children that are not the same as the listed sons of Raum the Old. However, there is also no inconsistency within the text with Raum the Old being identified with either above-mentioned King Raum.

The second Raum may be King Raum the Old. In Hversu Noregr byggðist, as well as other sagas, such as Örvar Odd's saga, the cognomen inn gamli - the Old - refers to the person's longevity, not as in the elder or younger of two. Quite specifically the cognomen inn gamli refers to a certain capability of death-defiance acquired by certain sacrifices (blót), typically lasting for three hundred years (signifying 360 years as hundred in Norse meant 120, not 100). This is explained in the saga itself. At least three kings in this and other sagas has acquired this cognomen explicitly this way:

- Snœr the Old (hinn Gamli), the grandfather of King Nór, father to King Raum Nórsson, who is grandfather to Raum the Old (hinn Gamli)
- Halfdan the Old is grandson to Raum the Old Björnsson and father to nine royal lineages, among them Næfill, the eponymous anchestor of the Niebelungen, famous through Richard Wagner's operacycle Der Ring des Nibelungen
- Örvar Odd, the son of a peculiar couple from Hålogaland, Lopthœna and Grimr Ulfsson. In Örvar Odd's saga the story of his longevity is told explicitly.

It is not specified that Raum the Old performs the same death-defying ritual sacrifice, blót, yet he is in the specific lineage that performs it, with particular reference to King Halfdan hinn Gamli and Snær hinn Gamli. This may explain why Raum the Old is not necessarily the eldest of the two persons named Raum in Hversu Noregr byggðist. It is noted though that King Hálfdan hinn Gamli performs the blót just as Snœr hinn Gamli. Snœr is the great grandfather of Raum Nórrson, not the Old, yet the elder, the father of Þorri, namesake of the Þorrimanuðr, the fourth month of the winter half. Þorri is the father of Nór, eponymous of Norway, Gór, eponymous of the first month of the winter half. Nór and Gór's sister is eponymous of the fifth month, Góimanuður. Góí is the aunt of the elder Raum, presumably not Raum the Old. His father Jotunbjørn is also known as the Old, in Hversu... It is said in the end about King Raum hinn Gamli, though, that he later got Hildar daughter of King Guðröðar hinn Gamli, son of King Sölva. Queen Hildar and King Raum the Old get four sons, Guðrøðr who became King after Raum, Haukr, Haddingr and Hringr. Guðrøðr became the father of King Eysteinn Illráði, "the Ill-ruler" who put his dog Saurr to rule as King of Þrændum, as revenge for the people there having killed his son Önund. It is seldom a fruitful endeavour to count generations, yet the saga-literature operates with rather distinct strata of historicity and myth, as in this example. King Eysteinn also known by the eponym Beli, is contemporary with Ragnar Loðbrok & Aslaug Kraka, suggesting that the Raum the Old at the end of Hversu Noregr byggðist, indeed is the younger Raum, if not it is the explicit intention to suggest that Raum the Old really lives on and on. It doesn't get easier by the somewhat hidden subcurrent regarding kerlingavilla, the belief in the wanderings of the soul from life to life, as expressed in the Olaf Geirrstaðaalfrs þáttr.

=== Descendants of King Raum, son of Nór ===
==== Descendants of Gudbrand ====
Gudbrand inherited the valley (now known as Gudbrandsdalen) from his father Raum. King Gudbrand was father of King Audleif (Auðleifr), father of King Gudmund (Guðmundr), father of Gudbrand who refused to be king, gave himself an earl's name (Jarl Guðbrand) instead, as he wanted to become the mightiest earl (or most rich) in the northern lands. Jarl Gudbrand's son was Jarl Geirmund (Geirmundr), father of Jarl Hródgeir (Hróðgeirr), father of Gudbrand who refused the title of jarl (earl) and called himself hersir (cf. centaurion, chief of a hundred) as did his descendants.

==== Descendants of Jötunbjörn ====
Jötunbjörn the Old inherited Raumaranes Dale from his father King Raum. (Raums Dale is the modern district of Romerike in the county of Akershus. Jötunbjörn was father of King Raum, father of Hrossbjörn (Hrossbjǫrn), father of Orm Broken-shell (Ormr Skjelamoli), father of Knatti who had two sons: Thórolf (Þórolfr) and Ketil Raum (Ketill Raumr). A variant of this genealogy appears at the beginning of the Vatnsdæla saga in which Ketil the Large is the direct son of Orm Broken-shell with no mention of either Knatti or of Ketil's brother Thórolf. Also nothing is said of Jötunbjörn's ancestry, only that he was from the north of Norway.

The Hversu then relates that Thórolf was father of Helgi, the father of Bersi, the father of Thormód (Þormóðr), the father of Thórlaug (Þórlaugr) who was the mother of Tungu-Odd (Tungu-Oddr). In the Landnámabók (1:15) it is said that two brothers whose ancestry is not given settled the Akraness in Iceland between Kalman's river (Kalmansár) and Char river (Aurridaár). One was Thormod who settled the land to the south of Reymir, and dwelt at Holm; he was the father of Bersi and Geirlaug, the mother of Tungu-Odd (Tungu-Oddr). The other was named Ketil. Further information appears in the Landnámabók (1.20). Tungu-Odd is a major character in Hænsna-Thóris saga (Hen-Thórir's saga). Geirlaug rather than Thorlaug is the name of Tungu-Odd's mother in all accounts except for that of the Hversu.

==== Descendants of Finnálf the Old ====
According to the Hversu, Finnalf inherited the land of East Dale (Eystri-Dal, modern day Østerdalen) and all the land north of Lake Vænir (modern Lake Vänern) from the Gautelfr (the modern Göta älv river) north to the Raumelfi (the modern Glomma, despite the name's similarity to the distant Rauma), and that the land was then called Álfheim.

Finnálf married Svanhild (Svanhildr) who was called Gold-feather (Gullfjǫðr) and was the daughter of Day (Dagr) son of Dayspring (Dellingr) by Sun (Sól) daughter of Mundilfari. Dag as a personification of day and the sun-goddess Sól are mentioned elsewhere, but only the Hversu mentions their daughter. Svanhild bore Finnálf a son named Svan the Red (Svanr inn rauðr) who was father of Sæfari, father of Úlf (Úlfr), father of Álf, father of Ingimund (Ingimundr) and Eystein (Eysteinn).

According to the eddic poem Hyndluljód (stanza 12), Óttar, whose genealogy is the subject of this poem, was son of Innstein (Innsteinn), son of Álf the Old, son of Úlf, son of Sæfari, son of Svan the Red. So the Innstein of the Hyndluljód and Eystein of the Hversu are presumably identical.

=== Descendants of Raum the Old ===
==== Descendants of Gudröd ====
Gudröd, Raum's eldest legitimate son, inherited the largest portion of his father's lands. Gudröd's son was Eystein the Wicked (Eysteinn illráði) who conquered part of Trondheim and set his son Önund over it. When Önund was killed in a revolt, Eystein made his dog, Saur, king of the territory. The tale is also told more fully as a deed of long ago in the Saga of Hakon the Good in the Heimskringla where Eystein (no parentage given) is said to be King of the Uplands in Norway, part of the modern county of Oppland. See Snær for another use of the dog king motif.

==== Descendants of Höd ====
Höd ruled over Hadeland (Haðaland). Höd was father of Höddbrodd (Hǫðbroddr). (The name Höd is identical to that born by the slayer of the god Baldr in other tales. And while the Höd of the Hversu is said to be father of a son named Höddbrodd, in Saxo Grammaticus' Gesta Danorum (Book 3) Høtherus, the slayer of Balderus, is the son of Hothbrodus or Hothbroddus.)

The Hversu relates that Höddbrodd son of Höd was the father of Hrólf (Hrólfr), father of Hrómund Berserk (Hrómundr berserkr), father of three children: Hámund (Hámundr), Haki, and Gunnlöd (Gunnlǫð).

Hámund was Earl of Hordaland and father of Hrók the Black (Hrókr inn svartr) and Hrók the White (Hrókr inn hvítr). Haki was father of Hródgeir (Hróðgeirr), father of Haki Berserk. Gunnlöd was the mother of Útstein (Ústeinn) and Innstein (Innsteinn). In Hálfs saga ok Hálfsrekka ('The saga of Hálf and his heroes'), the two brothers named Hrók and the brothers Útstein (Útstein) and Innstein play prominent roles. This saga names the father of Útstein and Instein as a Jarl named Álf the Old of Hordaland, which is one of Hálf's kingdoms.

Hrók the Black was the father of Gunnlöd (Gunnlǫð) the mother of Hrómund Gripsson, the protagonist of Hrómundar saga Gripssonar ('Saga of Hrómund Gripsson'). Two sons of Hrómund named Björnólf (Bjǫrnólfr) and Hróald (Hróaldr) appear among the first Norse settlers in Iceland in the Landnámabók (1.3) and are mentioned in other sagas.

==== Descendants of Hadding ====
The Hversu tells that Hadding (Haddingr) son of Raum ruled over Haddingjadal and Telemark (Þelamǫrk). He was father of son also named Hadding, who himself was father of another Hadding, father of Högni the Red. The Hversu then comments cryptically that after him the three Haddings (Haddingjar) took power, that they ruled one after the other, and that Helgi Hadding-prince (Haddingjaskati) was one of them.

The Haddingjar are otherwise known as two of the sons of Arngrim of which the fullest account is in Hervarar saga and are certainly not the Haddingjar spoken of by the Hversu. (But some suspect all references to the Haddingjar are garblings of old traditions about the divine twins.) Helgi Haddingjaskati is mentioned in the prose epilogue to the eddic poem Helgavida Hundingsbana II which states that Helgi Hundingsbane and his Valkyrie and his lover Sigrún were afterwards reincarnated as Helgi Haddingjaskati and Kára as told in the Káraljód (Káraljóðr), a poem no longer extant. A version of this tale survives only in Hrómundar saga Gripssonar in which the Haldingjar are two concurrent kings of Sweden and Helgi is their champion. Helgi conquers in part through the magic of his lover, the sorceress Kára, who appears in the form of a swan. When Helgi accidentally kills her, he meets his own doom and the Halding kings flee. Haldingjar seems to a garblings of Haddingjar. The Hversu account probably indicates a version in which both Helgi and the two Haddingjar proper (probably here the sons of Högni the Red) were all three called Haddingjar and ruled in rotation. Also, in the text the name of Helgi's lover actually appears as Cára, which should have been normalized as Kára. But Cára was instead misread and transcribed as Lára in Jónsson and Vilhjálmsson's Fornaldarsögur Norðurlanda and so appears in most later discussion.

==== Descendants of Hring ====
Raum's son Hring was the eponym and ruler of Ringerike (Ringeríki) and also ruled Valdres (a valley of modern Oppland). Hring married the daughter of a sea-king named Vifil (Vifill) by whom he was the father of Halfdan the Old (Hálfdan gamli). See Halfdan the Old to follow this lineage further.

== In Thorsteins saga Víkingssonar ==
In Thorsteins saga Víkingssonar, King Raum is called the father of Bryngerð, who was married to Álf the Old of Álfheim. It is said that Bryngerð was large and not beautiful because she took after her father.
