= Nedre Romerike =

Coordinates: 60°02′34″N 10°52′54″E

Nedre Romerike is the lower (southern) part of the Romerike traditional district in Akershus, Norway. It consists of the municipalities Lillestrøm, Lørenskog, Nittedal, Rælingen and Aurskog-Høland. It make up the area served by Nedre Romerike District Court, based in Lillestrøm. The upper (northern) half of Romerike is known as Øvre Romerike.

Øvre Romerike Nedre Romerike
