= Bjørn Farmann =

- King in Vestfold
- Reign: ? – ?
- Coronation: none
- Predecessor: None
- Successor: Gudrød Bjørnsson
- Born: c. ? Norway
- Died: c. 930–934; Norway
- Burial: Tønsberg
- Wife: Unknown name
- Issue: Sons include: Gudrød Bjørnsson
Names
- Bjørn Haraldsson
- Dynasty: Fairhair dynasty
- Father: Harald Fairhair
- Mother: Svanhild Eysteinsdottir

Bjørn Farmann ("Bjørn the Tradesman", also called Bjørn Haraldsson, Farmand and Kaupman, died between 930 and 934) was a king of Vestfold. Bjørn was one of the sons of King Harald Fairhair of Norway. In late tradition, Bjørn Farmann was made the great-grandfather of Olaf II of Norway, through a son Gudrød Bjørnsson.

== Biography ==
Bjørn Farmann was one of the sons born of Harald Fairhair with Svanhild, daughter of Eystein Earl. When Harald Fairhair died, his kingdom was divided up between his sons. Bjørn Farmann became the king of Vestfold, the county west of the Oslofjord, and is considered as the founder of Tønsberg. Bjørn Farmann spent most of his time at the court at Sæheimr located near Sem, Norway. Erik Bloodaxe (Old Norse: Eiríkr blóðøx, Norwegian: Eirik Blodøks) was the eldest son of Harald Fairhair and became the second king of Norway (930–934). Once the power was in his hands, Erik Bloodaxe began to quarrel with his other brothers and had four of them killed, including Bjørn Farmann. Bjørn was killed by Eirik Bloodaxe in a feud around 930–934 AD at Sæheimr. Later in battle at Tønsberg, Erik Bloodaxe killed Olaf Haraldsson Geirstadalf, king of Vingulmark and later also of Vestfold together with Sigrød Haraldsson, king of Trondheim.

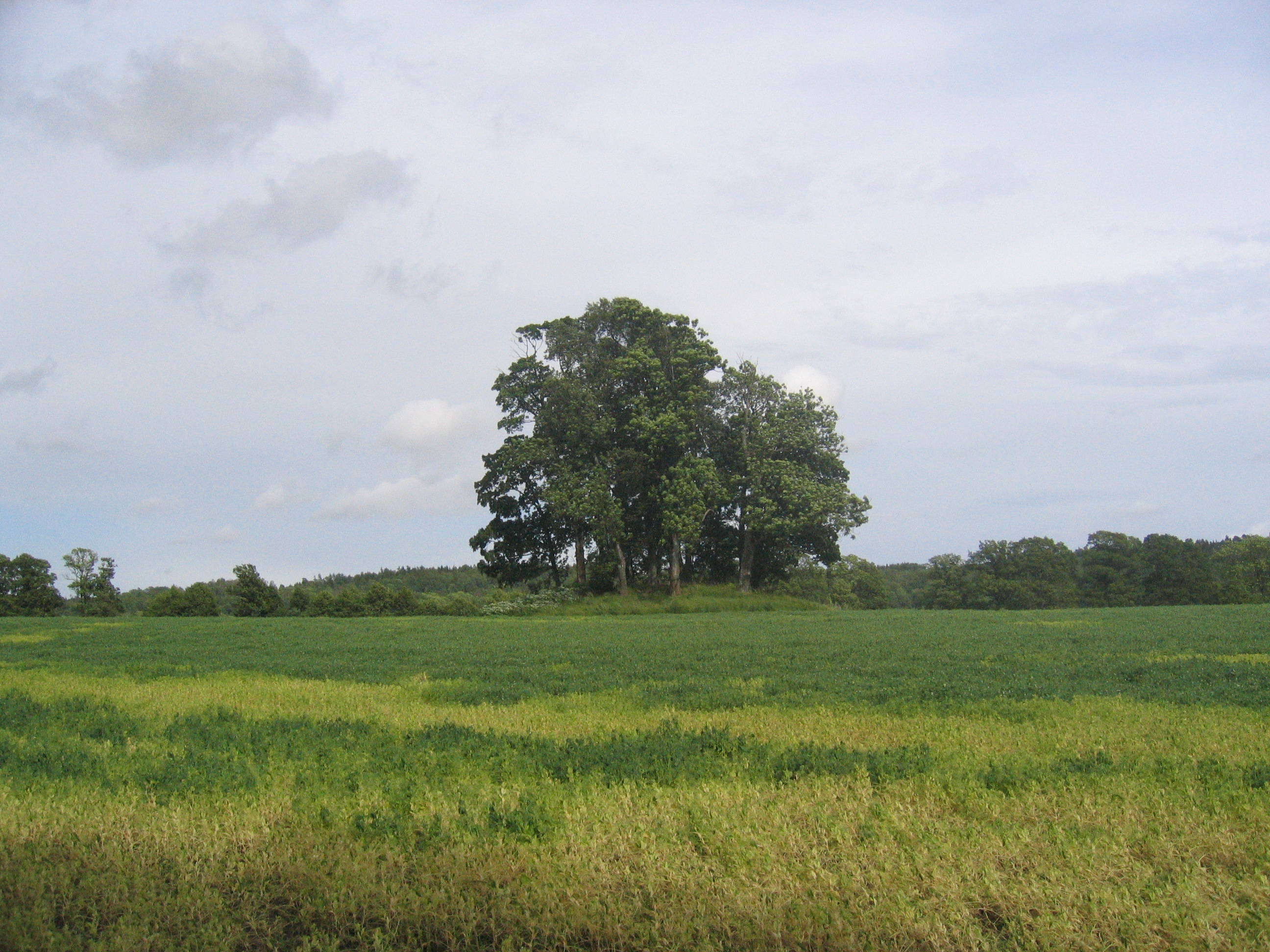
Farmannshaugen, the probable burial mound of Bjørn Farmann.

== Snorri Sturluson ==
Snorri Sturluson tells this of Bjørn, in an extract from Heimskringla, Harald Harfager's Saga:

King Harald and Svanhild's son Bjorn, who went by the name Bjorn Farmann, ruled over Vestfold at that time, and generally lived at Tunsberg, and went but little on war expeditions. Tunsberg at that time was much frequented by merchant vessels, both from Viken and the north country, and also from the south, from Denmark, and Saxland. King Bjorn had also merchant ships on voyages to other lands, by which he procured for himself costly articles, and such things as he thought needful; and therefore his brothers called him Farman (the Seaman), and Kaupman (the Chapman). Bjorn was a man of sense and understanding, and promised to become a good ruler. He made a good and suitable marriage, and had a son by his wife, who was named Gudrød Bjørnsson. Eirik Blood-axe came from his Baltic cruise with ships of war, and a great force, and required his brother Bjorn to deliver to him King Harald's share of the scat and incomes of Vestfold. But it had always been the custom before, that Bjorn himself either delivered the money into the king's hands, or sent men of his own with it; and therefore he would continue with the old custom, and would not deliver the money. Eirik again wanted provisions, tents, and liquor. The brothers quarrelled about this; but Eirik got nothing and left the town. Bjorn went also out of the town towards evening up to Saeheim. In the night Eirik came back after Bjorn, and came to Saeheim just as Bjorn and his men were seated at table drinking. Eirik surrounded the house in which they were; but Bjorn with his men went out and fought. Bjorn, and many men with him, fell. Eirik, on the other hand, got a great booty, and proceeded northwards. But this work was taken very ill by the people of Viken, and Eirik was much disliked for it; and the report went that King Olaf would avenge his brother Bjorn, whenever opportunity offered. King Bjorn lies in the mound of Farmanshaug at Saeheim.
