= Olaf Haraldsson (disambiguation) =

Olaf Haraldsson (995–1030; Old Norse: Óláfr Haraldsson) was the King of Norway from 1015 to 1028.

Olaf Haraldsson may also refer to:

- Olaf Haraldsson Geirstadalf (died in 934), reputed son of King Harald Fairhair of Norway
- Olaf III of Norway (c. 1050 – 1093), King of Norway from 1067 to 1093
