= Åsa Haraldsdottir of Agder =

Norwegian queen regnant

Åsa Haraldsdottir of Agder (died c. 834?) was a semi-legendary Norwegian Viking Age queen regnant of the petty kingdom of Agder. According to sagas referencing the clan Yngling (Ynglingaätten), she was the mother of Halfdan the Black (Halvdan Svarte), Sigurd Ring (Sigurd Hringrr) and also grandmother of King Harald Fairhair (Harald Hårfagre) and the legendary King Ragnar Lothbrok (Ragnarr Loðbrók).

== Biography ==
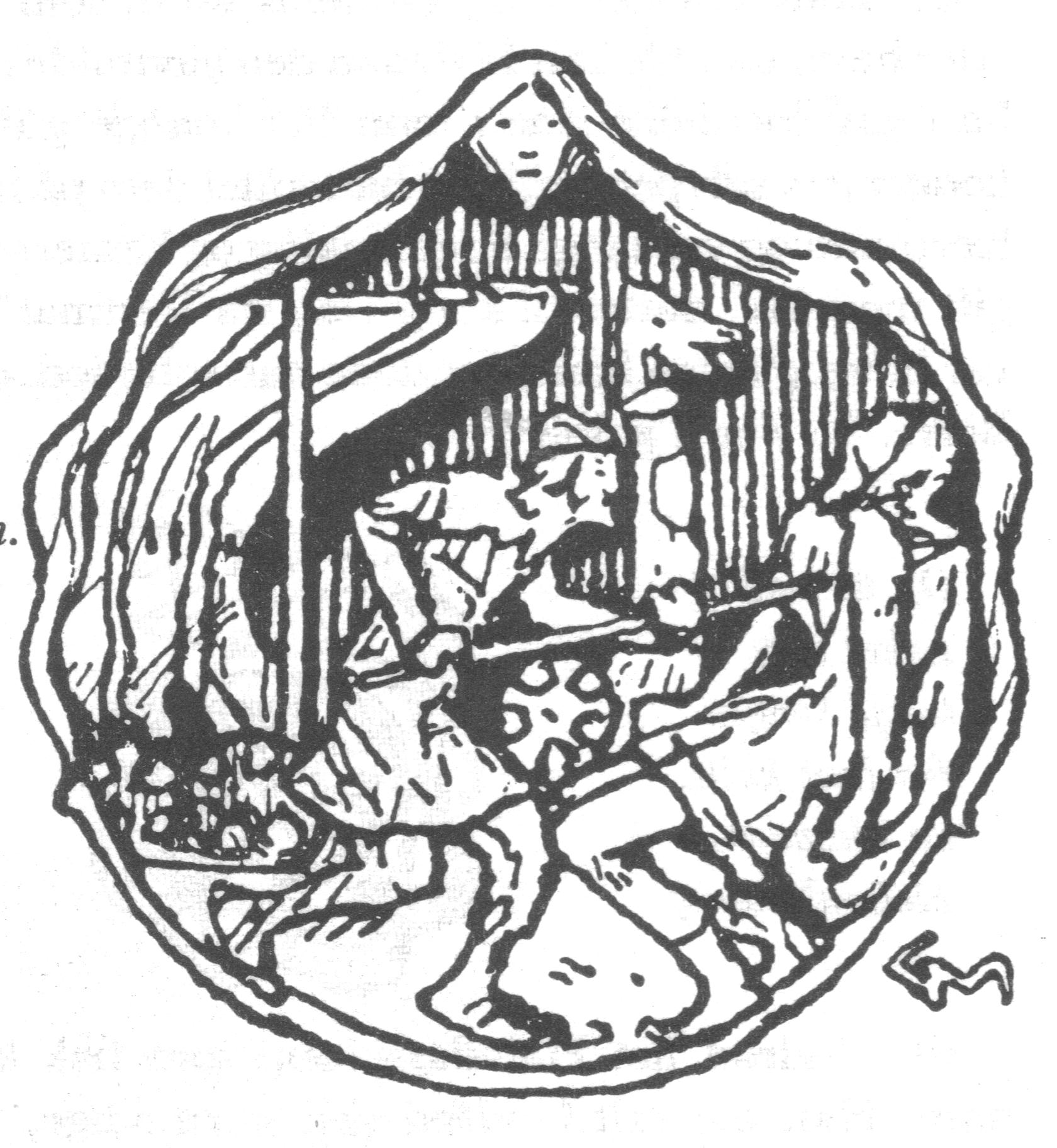
Gudrød is murdered (Illustration by Gerhard Munth)

Åsa was the daughter of King Harald Granraude of Agder. King Gudrød the Hunter (Gudrød Veidekonge) of Borre in Vestfold proposed marriage to her after the death of his first wife, but her father refused the marriage. Gudrød Veidekonge then killed her father and her brother, abducted her and married her. One year later, she became the mother of Halfdan the Black. One year after this, Åsa took her revenge and had her servant kill her husband.

She left the kingdom of Borre to her stepson Olaf Geirstad-Alf and took her own son with her to the kingdom of Agder, her birth country, where she took power. Åsa ruled Agder for twenty years, and after this she left the throne to her son, Halfdan the Black. He also demanded half of his father's kingdom from his half-brother.

There are theories, proposed by Professor Anton Wilhelm Brøgger of Oslo University, that queen Åsa was the woman buried with the famous Oseberg ship shortly after 834 AD, but this has not been confirmed.

== See also ==
- Princess of Öland
