= Olaf Geirstad-Alf =

Semi-legendary petty king in Norway

Olaf Gudrødsson (c. 810 – c. 860), known after his death as Olaf Geirstad-Alf "Olaf, Elf of Geirstad" (Old Norse Óláfr Geirstaðaalfr), was a semi-legendary petty king in Norway. A member of the House of Yngling, he was the son of Gudrød the Hunter and according to the late Heimskringla, a half-brother of Halfdan the Black. Gudrød and Olaf ruled a large part of Raumarike. The Þáttr Óláfs Geirstaða Alfs in Flateyjarbók records a fantastical story of how he was worshipped after his death and on his own instructions, his body was then decapitated so that he could be reborn as Olaf II of Norway (St. Olaf).

Two not necessarily conflicting hypotheses identify Geirstad with Gjerstad, formerly Geirekstad in Agder, and with Gokstad (possibly also a contraction of Geirekstad) in Vestfold, the location of the mound Gokstadhaugen, where the Gokstad Ship was excavated. The theory that Olaf thus had a connection with the ship burial is unproven.

== Ynglinga saga ==
In the Ynglinga saga portion of the Heimskringla, the king is reported to have died of a "disease in his foot" (fótarverkr) or gout, although the Flateyjarbók suggests the king succumbed to an epidemic of plague.

The Ynglinga saga also inserts the following verse by the 9th–10th century skald Þjóðólfr of Hvinir:

Og niðkvísl / í Noregi
þróttar Þrós / of þróast náði.
Réð Ólafr / ofsa forðum
víðri grund / of Vestmari.

Uns fótverkr / við Foldar þröm
vígmiðlung / of viða skyldi.
Nú liggr gunndjarfr / á Geirstöðum
herkonungr / haugi ausinn.

Long while this branch of Odin's stem
Was the stout prop of Norway's realm;
Long while King Olaf with just pride
Ruled over Westfold far and wide.
At length by cruel gout oppressed,
The good King Olaf sank to rest:
His body now lies under ground,
Buried at Geirstad, in the mound.

--tr. Samuel Laing and Rasmus B. Anderson, Heimskringla, p.329

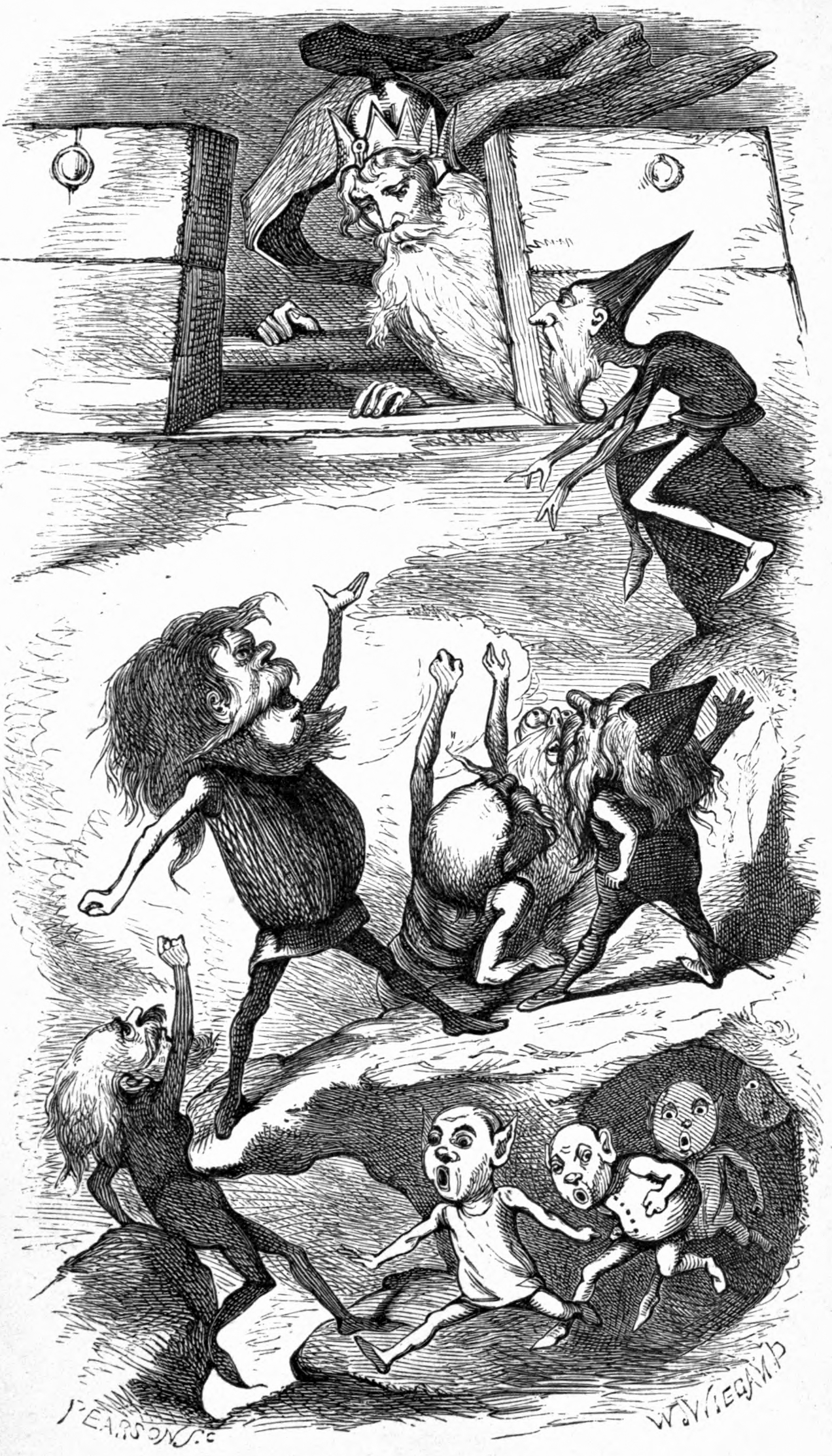
St. Olaf and elves; 1871 illustration by W. J. Wiegand of a story based on the Danish ballad "Hellig-Olavs Væddefart" (DgF 50)

== Olaf Geirstad-Alf ==
Olaf was worshipped after his death as an "elf", and was called the Geirstad-alf (the "elf of Geirstad"). The account of this is recorded in the Þáttr Ólafs Geirstaða Alfs in the Flateyjarbók version of Óláfs saga helga, and continues with a fantastical story of how he became a draugr haunting his own barrow (haugr), but ordered it to be destroyed so he could be reborn as St. Olaf.

According to this version, Olaf was carried away by a plague that subsided after his death. Olaf had instructed his people to build a mound and lay him to rest inside, but forbidden them to worship him after his death seeking boons; however, as he had suspected, once the next famine arrived, "they resorted to the plan of sacrificing to King Olaf for plenty, and they called him Geirstaðaálfr".

Later, the spirit of Olaf appeared in a dream to a man named Hrani, who was instructed to break into the barrow, salvage a ring, a sword named Bæsingr, and a belt, which were to be presented to Queen Ásta for her future son, and to sever the head of the dead body while making sure the head was set straight on its neck. Hrani did as instructed, and the queen gave birth to the future St. Olaf. When this Olaf was riding past the barrow one day, one of his men remembered him saying he had once been laid to rest there. The king vehemently denied this, saying his soul could not occupy two bodies. Hilda Ellis Davidson suggests the notion of rebirth is communicated here. At any rate, Olaf II is thought to have been named after Olaf Geirstad-Alf.

That the king came to be called an "elf" should not be taken too literally. Vigfusson and Powell discuss the story among others under the heading of "Ancestor Worship" and note that in these instances, "the dead were called 'Elves'". Davidson gives a more extensive summary in her discussion of "The Cult of the Dead".
