= Bjærum grave =

Legendary Norwegian king

Bjærum grave (Norwegian: Bjærumfunnet) in a burial mound in Hægebostad Municipality in Agder county, Norway. The grave has been dated to the Migration Period between AD 200 and 550. According according to local legends, the legendary chieftain Bjæring was buried there.

== Other sources ==
- Stylegar, Frans-Arne (2007). Farmers, Mariners, and Lords of Long-ago - Archaeology and Pre-history in the Agder region (PDF). Vest-Agder County Council.
