= Halfdan Hvitbeinn =

Semi-legendary Norwegian petty king

Halfdan Whiteshanks (Old Norse: Hálfdan hvítbeinn) was a semi-historical petty king in Norway, described in the Ynglinga saga. The following description is based on the account in Ynglinga saga, written in the 1220s by Snorri Sturluson.

He was the son of Olof Trätälja of the House of Yngling. His father was sacrificed to Odin by the Swedish settlers in Värmland because of a famine. Some Swedes, however, realised that the famine was brought by overpopulation and not by the fact that the king had been neglecting his religious duties.

Consequently, they resolved to cross the Ed Forest and settle in Norway and happened to end up in Soleyar, where they killed king Sölve and took Halfdan prisoner. The Swedish expatriates elected Halfdan king as he was the son of their old king, Olof. Halfdan subjugated all of Soleyar and took his army into Romerike and subjugated that province as well.

Halfdan was to become a great king, who married Åsa, the daughter of king Eystein, the ruler of Oppland and Hedmark. They had two sons, Eystein Halfdansson and Gudröd.

Halfdan conquered a large part of Hedemark, Toten, Hadeland and a part of Vestfold. When his brother Ingjald Olofsson died, he inherited Värmland. Halfdan died of old age in Toten and was transported to Vestfold, where he was buried under a mound in Skiringssal.

Preceded by Olof Trätälja	Head of the House of Yngling	Succeeded by Eystein Halfdansson
