= Vingulmark =

Old name for an area of Norway

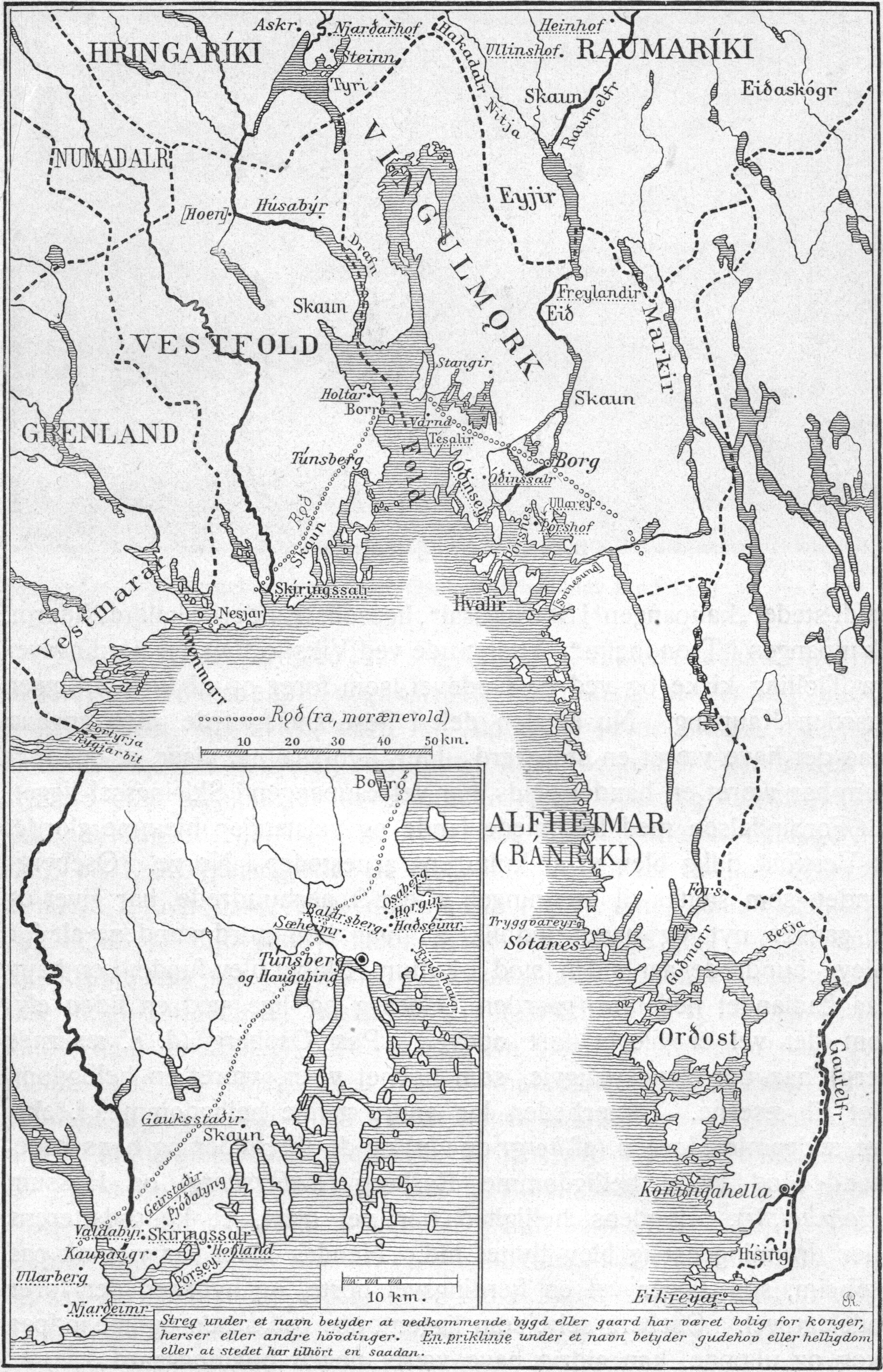
Map of Vingulmörk and Vestfold Norges historie fremstillet for det norske folk I-2 (1910)

Vingulmark (Old Norse Vingulmǫrk) is the old name for the area in Norway which today makes up the counties of Østfold, western parts of Akershus (excluding Romerike), and eastern parts of Buskerud (Hurum and Røyken municipalities), and includes the site of Norway's modern capital city, Oslo. During the Middle Ages, Vingulmark was an administrative unit limited to Oslo, Bærum and Asker.

== Etymology ==
The Old Norse form of the name was Vingulmǫrk. The first part of the name, Vingul, is the accusative case of Vingull, "fescue", or "fool". The last element of the name, mark or plural mǫrk, "forest" or "March", i.e. the forest of fescues/fools. The Lexicon Poeticon and Völsa Þattr tells that 'vingull' is the name for a stallions genitalia

== History ==
According to medieval kings' sagas, it was a Viking Age petty kingdom. Vingulmark was one of the four counties under the Court of Law, which together constituted the ancient landscape of Viken. Archaeologists have made finds of richly endowed burials in the area around the estuary of the river Glomma, at Onsøy, Rolvsøy and Tune, where the remains of a ship, the Tune ship, were found. This indicates that there was an important center of power in this area.

There are indications that at least the southern part of this area was under Danish rule in the late 9th century. In the account of Ottar, which was written down at the court of the English king Alfred the Great, Ottar says that when he sailed south from Skiringssal, he had Denmark on the port side for three days. This would include parts of Vingulmark.

Snorri Sturluson writes in Heimskringla and Fagrskinna, that King Harald Fairhair inherited part of Vingulmark from his father Halfdan the Black. King Harald defeated King Gandalf, who had previously held half of Vingulmark. Snorri Sturluson relates in Heimskringla that the area was also claimed by the Swedish King Erik Emundsson. The Norwegians invaded Götaland to defend their claim.

== Legendary rulers ==
The sagas name several more or less legendary kings as rulers of Vingulmark:

- Gudrød the Hunter, half of Vingulmark
- Alfgeir (Old Norse: Álfgeir)
- Gandalf Alfgeirsson
- Halfdan the Black
- Olaf Haraldsson
- Tryggve Olafsson
- Harald Gudrødsson Grenske, 976-987

== See also ==
- Germanic peoples

== Other sources ==
- Sandnes, Jørn; Stemshaug, Ola (1980). Norsk stadnamnleksikon. Oslo: Det norske samlaget. ISBN 82-52-109993.
- Sturlasson, Snorre (1979). Snorres kongesagaer (Heimskringla. Oslo. ISBN 82-05-31464-0.
