= Halfdan the Mild =

Semi-legendary Norwegian petty king

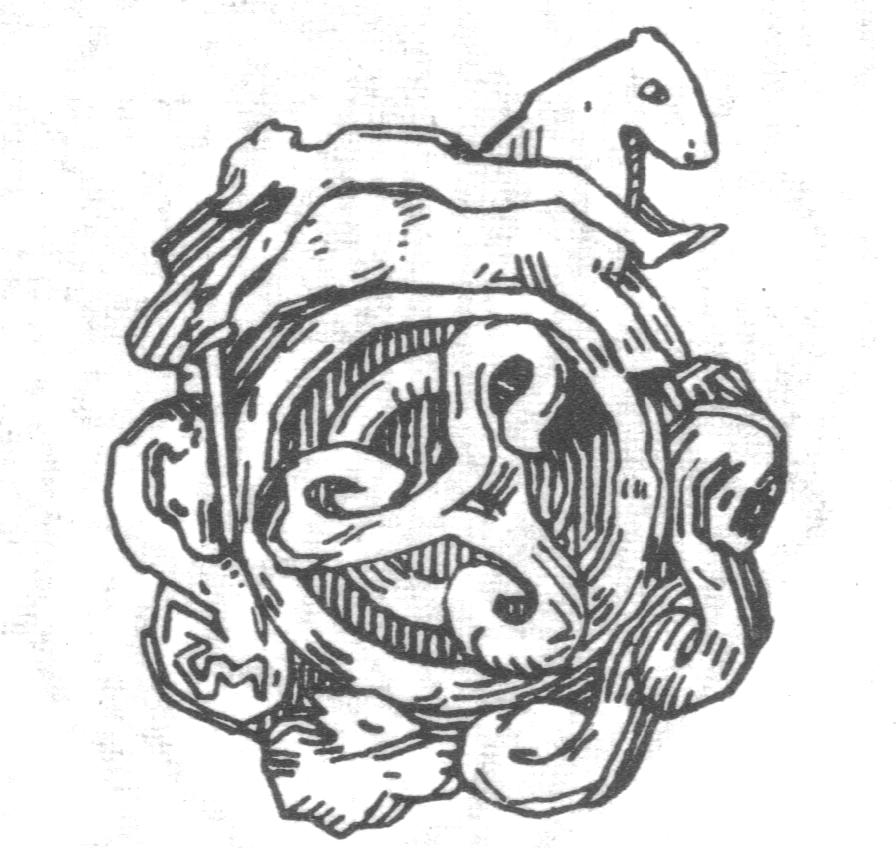
Gerhard Munthe's Illustration of Halfdan, from Ynglinge-saga.

Halfdan the Mild (Old Norse: Hálfdan hinn mildi ok hinn matarilli, (meaning the generous and stingy on food)) was the son of king Eystein Halfdansson, of the House of Yngling and he succeeded his father as king, according to Heimskringla. He was king of Romerike and Vestfold.

He was said to be generous in gold but would starve his men of food. He was a warrior who often pillaged and gathered great amounts of loot.

His wife was Liv, the daughter of king Dag of Vestmar. Halfdan the Mild died of illness in his bed.

He was succeeded by his son, Gudrød the Hunter.

According to the historian Halvdan Koht, Halfdan may have been the one to win independence for Vestfold during the turbulent years of 813–14. The Frankish annals state that the kings of Hedeby had to solve an uprising in Vestfold at this time. According to Ynglingatal, Halfdan's people "gained victory" in the uprising against King Hemming of the Danes, quite possibly because of the King of the Scyldingas in Hedeby, Southern Jutland were succumbing to Emperor Charlemagne, accepting the Peace of Heiligen and thereby the novel Christendom of the Frankish Romans, which split the Danes, whereupon King Halfdan appears to become the first King of the Scyldingas (the Danish royal clan), seated in Vestfold, north of Skagerrak.

Preceded by Eystein Halfdansson	Head of the House of Yngling	Succeeded by Gudrød the Hunter
