= Harald Granraude =

Semi-legendary 9th-century petty king in Norway

Harald Granraude (Haraldr hinn granrauði) was a semi-legendary Norwegian petty king of Agder who lived in the 9th century. He was father to Åsa Haraldsdottir and great-grandfather of Harald Fairhair (Haraldr Hárfagri), the first king of Norway.

When Gudrød the Hunter (Gudrød Veidekonge), of Borre in Vestfold proposed marriage to Åsa after the death of his first wife, Harald Granraude refused the proposal. This made Gudrød angry and he sailed with his ships to the king's farm on Tromøya. He arrived at Harald's farm at night and made a surprise attack. When Harald saw an army was coming, he retaliated with all his men. It was a hard battle and Harald lost. He and his son, Gyrd Haraldsson, were both killed. King Gudrød looted Harald's treasure and took and married Åsa.
