= Sigtryg Eysteinsson =

Norwegian petty king

Sigtryg Eysteinsson was king of the Norwegian petty kingdoms Raumarike and Hedmark in what is today south-eastern Norway. He was killed by Halfdan the Black (Halvdan Svarte) in the middle of the 9th century. Halfdan the Black subdued the area by first defeating and killing Sigtryg in battle and then defeated Sigtryg's brother and successor Eystein Eysteinsson in a series of battles.
