= Harald Grenske =

10th century King of Vestfold

Harald Grenske (10th century) was a petty king in Vestfold in Norway.

Harald Grenske was the son of Gudrød Bjørnsson. Gudrød is claimed to have been grandson of Harald Fairhair and the king of Vestfold. Harald's cognomen Grenske is due to his being raised in the district of Grenland, Norway. When Harald was only 11 years old, his father was slain by the sons of Gunnhild Gormsdóttir (i.e. Harald Greyhide and his brothers). Harald fled to Oppland and from there to Sweden, where he stayed with the powerful strongman Skagul Toste. They went on Viking expeditions together, principally within areas of the Baltic Sea.

When the sons of Gunnhild had been banished, Harald Grenske followed Haakon Sigurdsson who ruled Norway as a vassal of the Danish king Harald Bluetooth. Harald became the king of Vestfold and Agder. He married Åsta, the daughter of Gudbrand Kula.

Harald subsequently abandoned Åsta to woo Sigrid the Haughty, the daughter of Skagul Toste. She was the wealthy widow of Eric the Victorious and owned several farms in Svithjod. Sigrid found him too eager with his entreaties. She had him burnt to death inside a great hall following a feast to discourage other suitors. Harald died together with another suitor, Vissevald (Wsevolod) from Gardarike (Novgorod).

Harald's widow, Åsta, promptly gave birth to a son, Olaf Haraldsson, later king of Norway and patron saint of the nation. Åsta subsequently remarried to Sigurd Syr, the king of Ringerike.

No contemporary sources say anything about Harald, and the sagas only mention him in connection with St. Olaf's history. According to Snorri Sturluson in Olav Trygvasons saga, he was a king of Vingulmark, Vestfold and Agder. Recent scholarship has questioned the historicity of Harald.

== Other sources ==
- Bergljot Solberg Jernalderen i Norge (Oslo, 2000)
