= Eystein Halfdansson =

Norse petty king

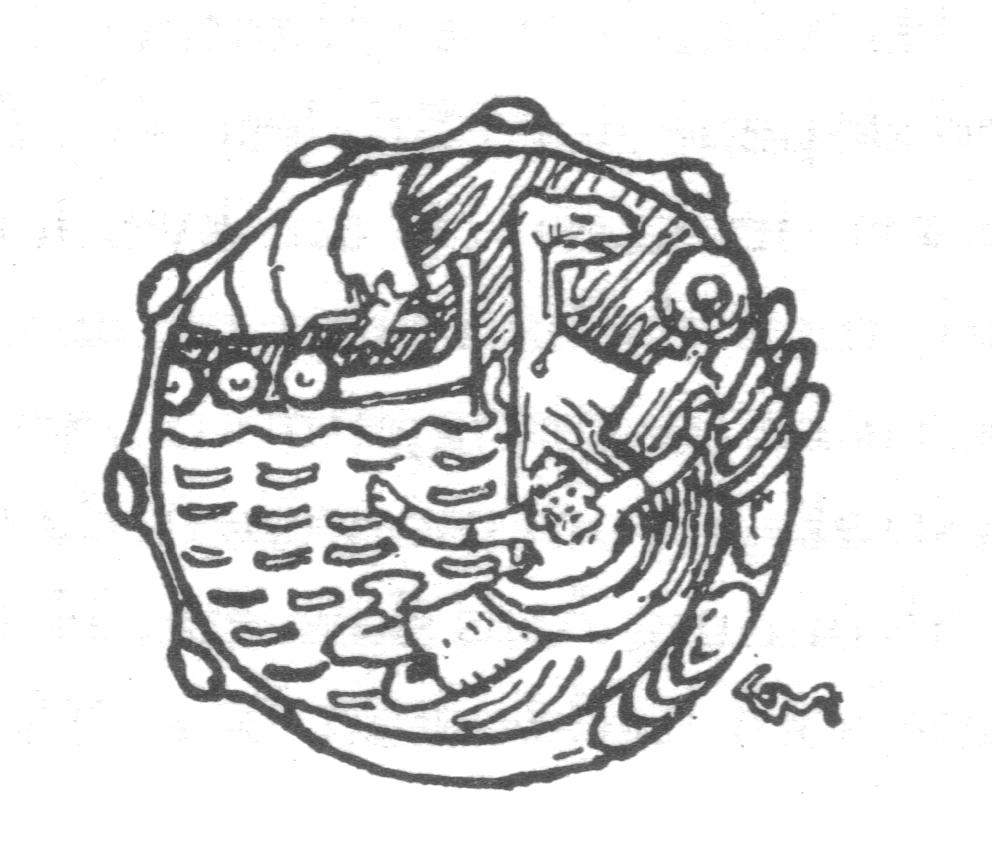
King Eystein is knocked off his ship. Illustration by Gerhard Munthe (1899)

Eystein Halfdansson (Old Norse: Eysteinn Hálfdansson) was the son of Halfdan Hvitbeinn of the House of Yngling according to Norse tradition.

He inherited the throne of Romerike. Ari Thorgilsson in his Íslendingabók calls him Eystein Fart (Old Norse: Eystein fret/fjert) without comment, in his king list, just naming his father and his son. Snorri does not call him by this nickname, but does give us a colorful story of his life.

His wife was Hild, the daughter of the king of Vestfold, Erik Ragnarsson. Erik had no son, so Eystein obtained Vestfold as his wife's inheritance.

According to Ynglinga saga, Eystein died returning from a viking raid to Varna, on the eastern side of the Oslofjord. Eystein's men had finished looting and pillaging the area and were already almost across the fjord, when King Skjöld of Varna, a great warlock, arrived at the beach and saw the sails of Eystein's ships. He waved his cloak and blew into it which caused a sail-bearing spar (boom) of one close sailing ship in heavy sea to swing and hit Eystein so that he fell overboard and drowned. His body was salvaged and buried in a mound at Borre. Eystein was succeeded by his son Halfdan the Mild.

== Sources ==
- Heimskringla in English
- Guðni Jónsson's edition of Íslendingabók
- Íslendingabók in English

Preceded by Halfdan Hvitbeinn	Head of the House of Yngling	Succeeded by Halfdan the Mild
