= Borre mound cemetery =

Burial mound site in Norway

Coordinates: 59°22′57″N 10°27′34″E

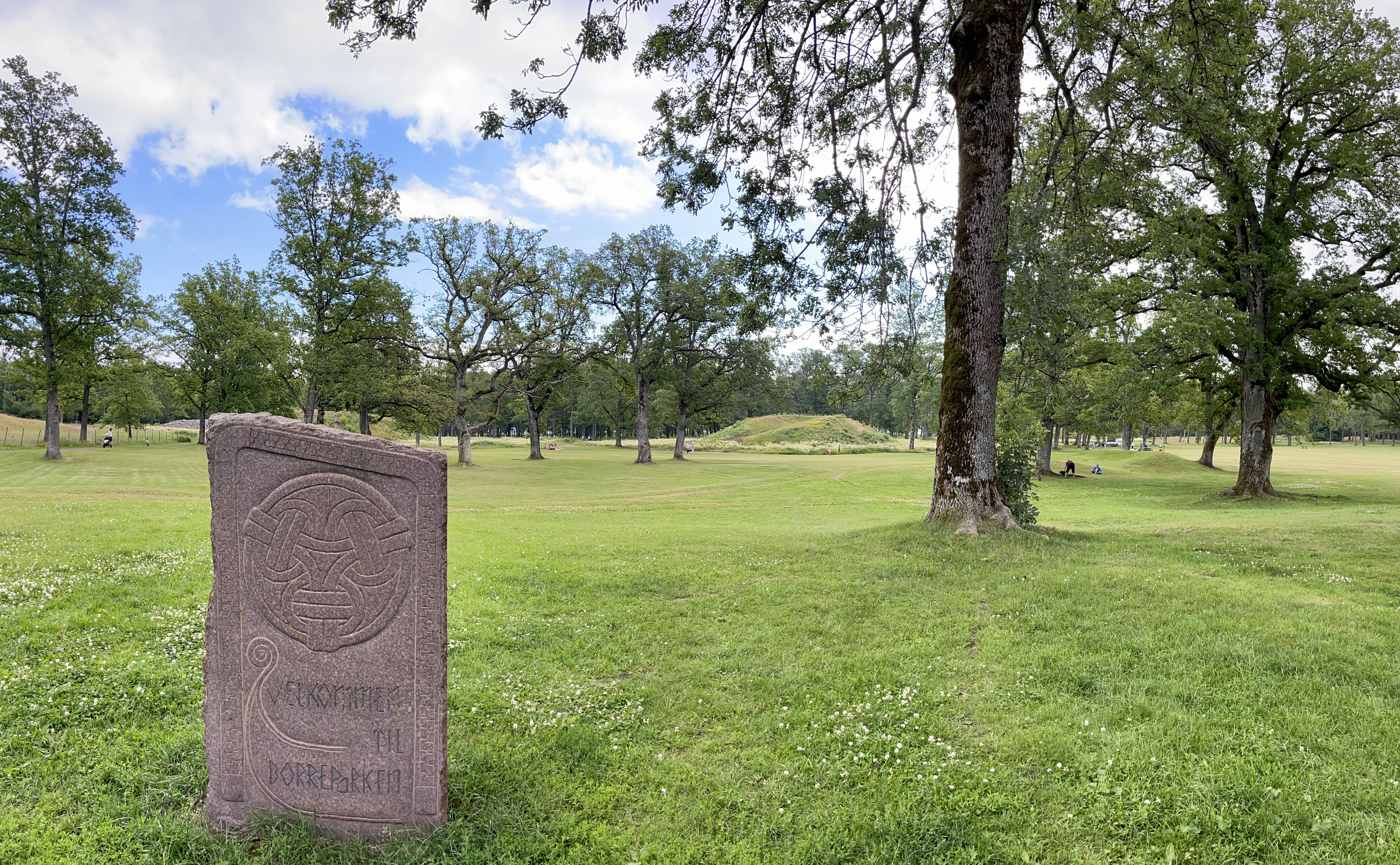

Borre mound cemetery (Norwegian: Borrehaugene from the Old Norse words borró and haugr meaning mound) forms part of the Borre National Park in Horten Municipality in Vestfold county, Norway.

It is home to seven large and 21 smaller burial mounds. Excavations in the 1980s revealed that the oldest mounds date to 600 AD, i.e. prior to the Viking Age.

== Background ==
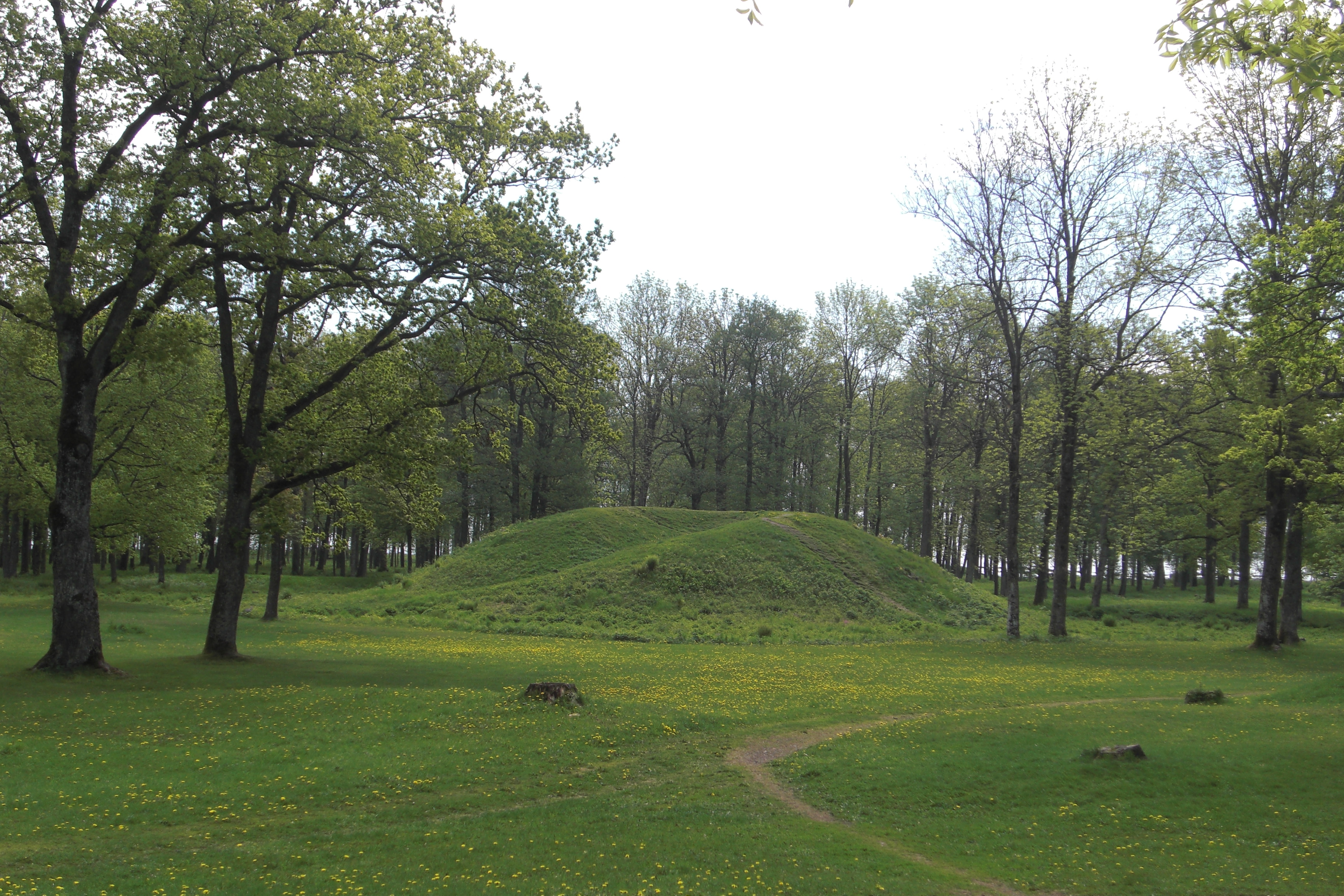
Viking Age burial mound in Borre National Park

The park covers 45 acres (18 ha; 180,000 m^{2}) and its collection of burial mounds is exceptional in Scandinavia. Today, seven large mounds and one cairn can be seen. At least two mounds and one cairn have been destroyed in modern times. There are also 25 smaller cairns and the cemetery may have been larger. Some of the monuments are over 45 metres (148 ft) in diameter and up to 6 metres (20 ft) high. Borrehaugene provides important historical knowledge and can be seen as evidence that there was a local power center from the Merovingian period to the Viking Age.

The first investigations of the cemetery took place in 1851–1852. Local road-builders used one of the mounds as a gravel-pit and in the process destroyed large parts of a richly equipped grave in a Viking ship. Antiquarian Nicolay Nicolaysen examined what was left of the mound. The grave contained weapons and riding equipment. The excavations uncovered an unusually good selection of craft work, much of which is on display at the Viking Ship Museum in Oslo.

This artistic craft work has become known as the Borre style and is today known for its beautiful animal and knot ornaments, which were often used for decorating harnesses. Some of the smaller cairns were investigated in 1925. They turned out to be simple cremation graves. More recent excavations were undertaken by archaeologist Bjørn Myhre in 1989 to 1991, both in and around the national park.

== Midgard Viking Center ==
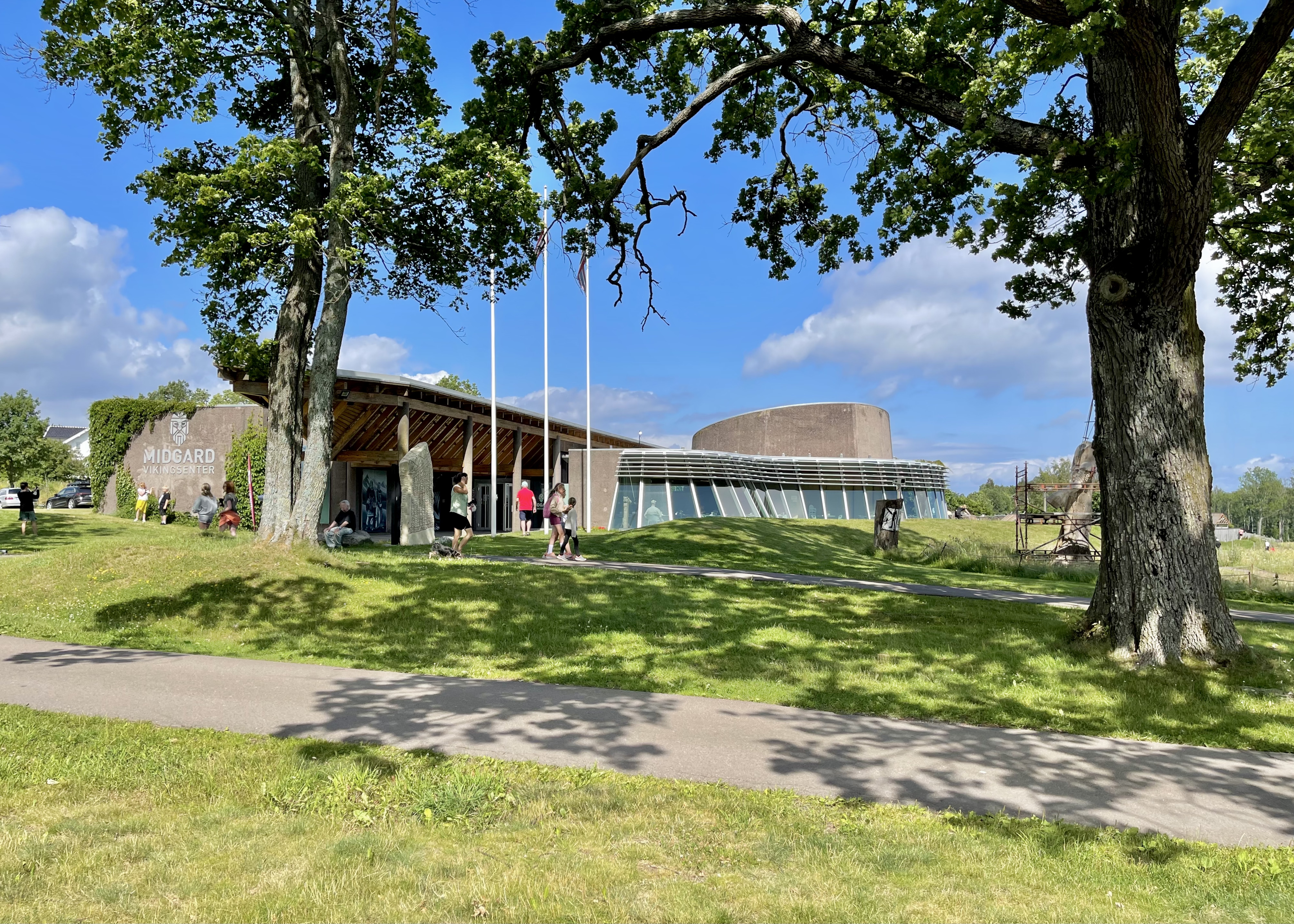
Midgard Viking Center provides exhibitions and offers guided tours of Borre National Park.

Midgard Viking Center (in Norwegian: Midgard vikingsenter, former known as Midgard Historical Center) at Borre was opened in 2000 and is part of the Vestfold Museum (Vestfoldmuseene). The center was established with the goal of spreading knowledge about the Viking Age. The center provides exhibitions and offers guided tours of Borre National Park.

== Archaeological activities ==
In October 2007 ground-penetrating radar (GPR) measurements conducted by the archaeological prospection unit of the Swedish Central National Heritage Board on behalf of Vestfold County Administration led to the discovery of the buried remains of two pre-historic hall buildings, the first substantial building remains discovered in the vicinity of Borre.

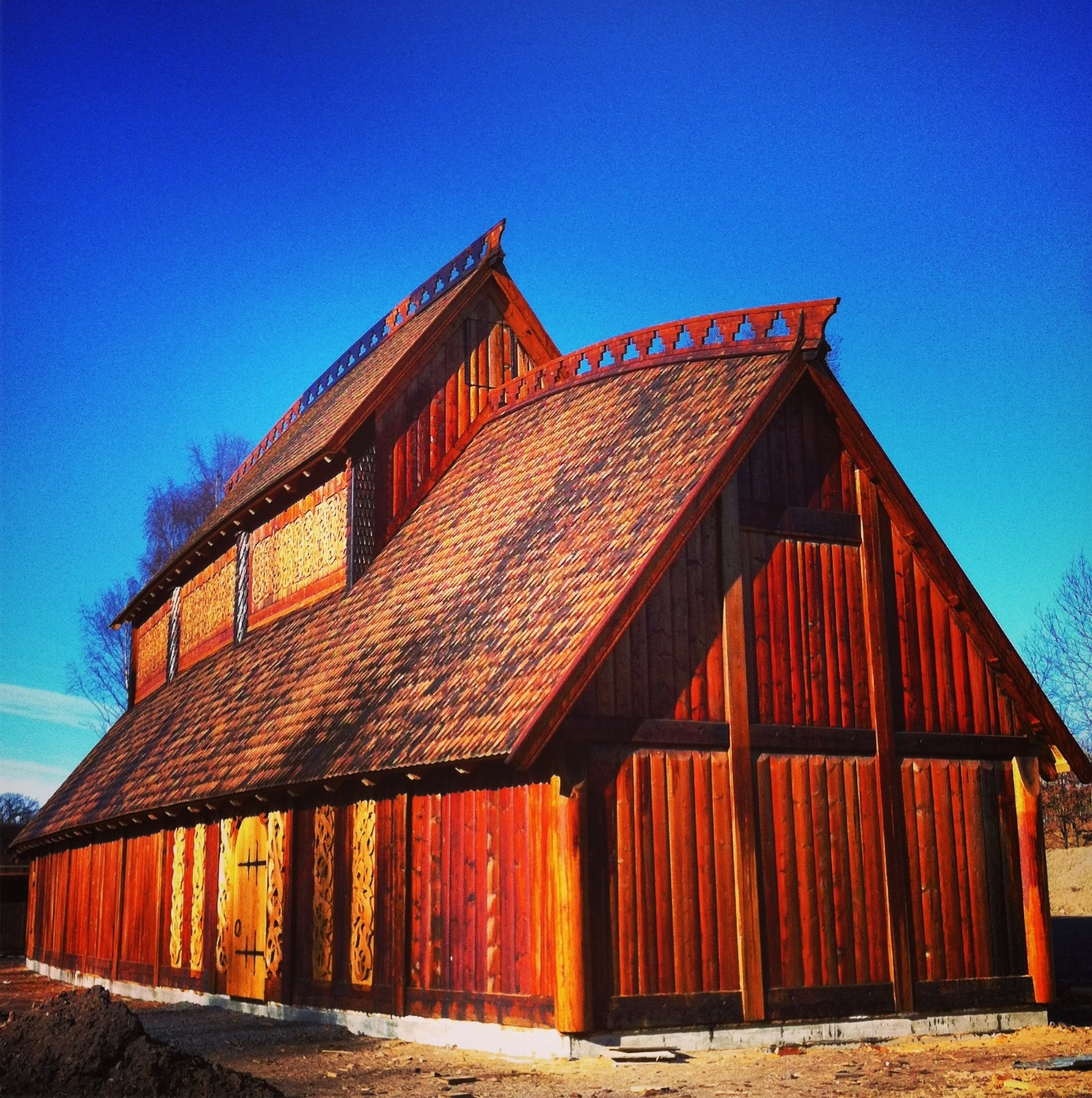
Reconstruction of a Viking Age feast hall near the park

In March 2013 a large-scale GPR survey conducted by the Ludwig Boltzmann Institute for Archaeological Prospection and Virtual Archaeology (LBI ArchPro) in collaboration with Vestfold County Administration and the Norwegian Institute for Cultural Heritage Research (NIKU) resulted in the discovery of another large hall building.

In 2015 Erich Draganits et al. suggested that a prehistoric harbour is likely to have been located at Borre based on the analysis of geomorphological features.

In March 2019 archaeologists found what is believed to be a buried Viking-era ship. Evidence so far points to it being a ship burial, typically constructed to serve as a tomb for high-ranking individuals.

== Other sources ==
- Forhistorien til nasjonalparken Norwegian
- Nasjonal Samlings bruk av nasjonalparken under andre verdenskrig Norwegian
