= Olaf Haraldsson Geirstadalf =

Norwegian petty king (c. 877–c. 934)

- Born: 877; Agder
- Died: 934; Tønsberg
- Issue: Sitric Cáech? Tryggve Olafsson
- Father: Harald Fairhair
- Mother: Svanhild Øysteinsdatter

Olaf Haraldssøn Geirstadalf Digerbein (Agder, c. 877 - Tønsberg, c. 934), was a reputed son of King Harald Fairhair of Norway with Svanhild Øysteinsdatter, daughter of Jarl Eystein Glumra.

== Biography ==
The saga Heimskringla, written in Iceland in the thirteenth century by the poet and historian Snorri Sturluson, gives the ninth century Norwegian founder king Harald Fairhair three sons with Svanhild, including Ragnar Rykkel, Bjørn Farmann and Olaf Haraldsson Geirstadalf. Bjørn Farmann became king of Vestfold. Olaf Haraldsson was made king of Vingulmark by his father and then later inherited Vestfold after his brother Bjørn Farmann had been killed by their half-brother Eric Blodøks.

Eric was king Harald's favourite son and his appointed successor, but he was not very popular among his half-brothers. Upon his father's death, Olaf made himself king of eastern Norway, and allied himself against Eric Bloodaxe with another half-brother, Sigrød Haraldsson, king of Trondheim. The three kings met in battle at the farm Haugar outside Tønsberg, Olaf and Sigrød were defeated and they both fell there. Both are presumed to have been buried on the same spot. Haugar became the seat for Haugating and Norway's second most important place for the proclamation of kings. Today the site is located on the Jarlsberg Estate situated northwest of the centre of the town of Tønsberg.

Heimskringla gives Olaf by his marriage a son named Tryggve Olafsson, who is there said to have become king of Ranrike and Vingulmark and to have been the father of King Olaf I of Norway. Historia Gruffydd ap Cynan, apparently influenced by 12th century claims of the viking kings of Ireland to an affiliation with the Norse rulers, contains a legendary or fictitious pedigree that makes Olaf the father of Sitric Cáech, king of Dublin and Northumbria, whose son Olaf Cuaran was ancestor of King Gruffydd ap Cynan of Gwynedd.
