= Agder =

County in Southern Norway

Agder County Agder fylke
- County
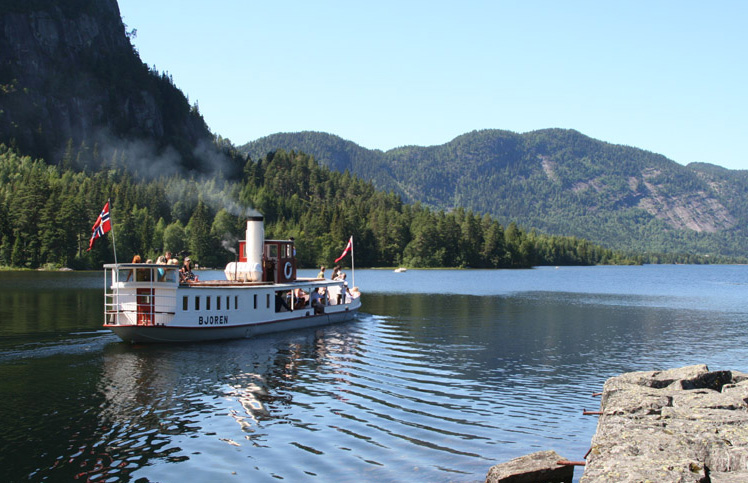
- Setesdal

- Flag Coat of arms

- Agder within Norway
- Coordinates: 58°46′46.53″N 7°40′6.45″E
- Country: Norway
- County: Agder
- District: Southern Norway
- Established: 1 Jan 2020
  - Preceded by: Aust-Agder and Vest-Agder counties
- Administrative centre: Kristiansand

Government
  - Body: Agder County Municipality
  - Governor (2022): Gina Lund (Ap)
  - County mayor (2019): Arne Thomassen (H)

Area
  - Total: 16,433.67 km^{2} (6,345.08 sq mi)
  - Land: 14,980.95 km^{2} (5,784.18 sq mi)
  - Water: 1,452.72 km^{2} (560.90 sq mi) 8.8%
  - Rank: #8 in Norway

Population (2021)
  - Total: 308,843
  - Rank: #8 in Norway
  - Density: 20.6/km^{2} (53/sq mi)
  - Change (10 years): ▲ +9.3%
- Demonym: Egde or Egd

Official language
  - Norwegian form: Neutral
- Time zone: UTC+01:00 (CET)
  - Summer (DST): UTC+02:00 (CEST)
- ISO 3166 code: NO-42
- Website: Official website

Agder is a county (fylke) and traditional region in the southern part of Norway and is coextensive with the Southern Norway region. The county was established on 1 January 2020, when the old Vest-Agder and Aust-Agder counties were merged. Since the early 1900s, the term Sørlandet ("south country, south land, southland") has been commonly used for this region, sometimes with the inclusion of neighbouring Rogaland. Before that time, the area was considered a part of Western Norway.

The area was a medieval petty kingdom, and after Norway's unification became known as Egðafylki and later Agdesiden, a county within the kingdom of Norway. The name Agder was not used after 1662, when the area was split into smaller governmental units called Nedenæs, Råbyggelaget, Lister, and Mandal. The name was resurrected in 1919 when two counties of Norway that roughly corresponded to the old Agdesiden county were renamed Aust-Agder (East Agder) and Vest-Agder (West Agder). Even before the two counties joined in 2020, they cooperated in many ways; the University of Agder had sites in both Aust-Agder and Vest-Agder, as did many other institutions, such as the Diocese of Agder og Telemark, the Agder Court of Appeal, and the Agder Police District.

== Name ==
The origin of the name Agder is uncertain. The Old Norse form of the name is Agðir or Egðafylki, and may derive from Old Norse ǫgð or Indo-European root *ak-, 'to be sharp', suggesting 'the land that juts out (into the sea)'. This same root may also appear in place names like Agdenes (in Orkland Municipality), Aga (in Bømlo Municipality) and Agdestein (in Stord Municipality). Another interpretation links it to Old Norse agi, meaning 'rough seas', which would make Agder 'the land by the turbulent sea'.

The Old Norse term for the inhabitants of the area was Egðir. The Egðir are believed to be the same etymologically as the Augandzi people mentioned in the Getica of Jordanes, who wrote of Scandza (Scandinavia) in the 6th century. If Jordanes's Scandza is a palatalized form of *Scandia, then Augandzi is likely a palatalized form of *Augandii, residents of *Augandia.

== Municipalities ==
On 1 January 1838, the formannskapsdistrikt law went into effect, creating local municipalities all over Norway. The municipalities have changed over time through mergers and divisions as well as numerous boundary adjustments. When Agder county was established on 1 January 2020, it had 25 municipalities.

Municipal number	Arms	Name	Establishment	Former municipal number (pre-2020 mergers)	Former county
4201		Risør Municipality	1 January 1838	0901 Risør	Aust-Agder
4202		Grimstad Municipality	1 January 1838	0904 Grimstad	Aust-Agder
4203		Arendal Municipality	1 January 1838	0906 Arendal	Aust-Agder
4204		Kristiansand Municipality	1 January 1838	1001 Kristiansand; 1017 Songdalen; 1018 Søgne	Vest-Agder
4205		Lindesnes Municipality	1 January 1964	1002 Mandal; 1021 Marnardal; 1029 Lindesnes	Vest-Agder
4206		Farsund Municipality	1 January 1838	1003 Farsund	Vest-Agder
4207		Flekkefjord Municipality	1 January 1838	1004 Flekkefjord	Vest-Agder
4211		Gjerstad Municipality	1 January 1838	0911 Gjerstad	Aust-Agder
4212		Vegårshei Municipality	1 January 1838	0912 Vegårshei	Aust-Agder
4213		Tvedestrand Municipality	1 January 1838	0914 Tvedestrand	Aust-Agder
4214		Froland Municipality	1 January 1850	0919 Froland	Aust-Agder
4215		Lillesand Municipality	1 January 1838	0926 Lillesand	Aust-Agder
4216		Birkenes Municipality	1 January 1838	0928 Birkenes	Aust-Agder
4217		Åmli Municipality	1 January 1838	0929 Åmli	Aust-Agder
4218		Iveland Municipality	1 January 1886	0935 Iveland	Aust-Agder
4219		Evje og Hornnes Municipality	1 January 1960	0937 Evje og Hornnes	Aust-Agder
4220		Bygland Municipality	1 January 1838	0938 Bygland	Aust-Agder
4221		Valle Municipality	1 January 1838	0940 Valle	Aust-Agder
4222		Bykle Municipality	1 January 1902	0941 Bykle	Aust-Agder
4223		Vennesla Municipality	1 January 1864	1014 Vennesla	Vest-Agder
4224		Åseral Municipality	1 January 1838	1026 Åseral	Vest-Agder
4225		Lyngdal Municipality	1 January 1838	1027 Audnedal; 1032 Lyngdal	Vest-Agder
4226		Hægebostad Municipality	1 January 1838	1034 Hægebostad	Vest-Agder
4227		Kvinesdal Municipality	1 January 1838	1037 Kvinesdal	Vest-Agder
4228		Sirdal Municipality	1 January 1849	1046 Sirdal	Vest-Agder

== History ==
Norway of the Viking Age was divided into petty kingdoms ruled by chiefs who contended for land, maritime supremacy, or political ascendance and sought alliances or control through marriage with other royal families, either voluntary or forced. These circumstances produced the generally turbulent and heroic lives recorded in the Heimskringla.

For example, the Ynglinga saga tells us that Harald Redbeard, chief of Agðir, refused his daughter Åsa to Gudröd Halvdanson, on which event Gudröd invaded Agðir, killed Harald and his son Gyrd, and took Åsa whether she would or no. She bore a son, Halvdan (the Black), and later arranged to have Gudröd assassinated. Among the royal families, these events seem to have been rather ordinary. Her word was the last in the argument, as her grandson, Harald Fairhair, unified Norway.

Kings of Agder

Legendary Kings

- Harald Agderking
- Víkar
- Kissa
- King Bjæring

Monarchs of Agder (790–987)

- Harald Granraude, 7??–815, father of Åsa
- Åsa, between 815 and 834–838, mother of Halfdan the Black
- Halfdan the Black, father of Harald Fairhair, from 838
- Kjotve the Rich, late 9th century
- Harald Gudrødsson Grenske, 976–987

Prior to the Viking Age is a gap in the region's history for a few hundred years, but in Jordanes we also find regions of the same but earlier forms of names, presumably also petty kingdoms under now unknown chiefs. The previous most credible source, Ptolemy, gives the briefest of sketches, only citing all of Norway as the Chaedini ("country people"). Perhaps the difference between kingdoms was not sufficiently important to cite them individually.

Prior to then the most credible and respected source, Tacitus in Germania Chapter 44 described the Suiones, who were divided into civitates (kingdoms?) along the coast of Scandinavia and were unusual in owning fleets of a special type of ship. These were pointed on both ends and were driven by banks of oars that could be rearranged or shipped for river passage. They did not depend on sail (so Tacitus says) but other than that they do not differ from Viking ships. These civitates went all the way around Scandinavia to the Arctic, or at least to regions of very long days, where they stopped.

It seems clear that in the Roman Iron Age Norway was populated by people of the same identity as Sweden, who were called the Suiones by Latin sources. In settling the coast at some point in prehistory they had been divided into civitates by the terrain. These states took on mainly geographical names or names of individuals or mythological characters. Agder was one of them.

After the unification of Norway by Harold Fairhair and army and allies in the 10th century, all the civitates became provinces (fylker) and after their conversion to Christianity, they became dioceses or parishes. The development of Old Norse into local dialects and the dissimilation of customs due to isolation added an ethnic flavor to the area, which is cherished today.
