= Romerike =

- District
- Map of Romerike including municipalities

- Location within Akershus Location within Norway
- Coordinates: 60°06′N 11°12′E
- Country: Norway
- County: Akershus
- Region: Austlandet

Romerike is a traditional district located north-east of Oslo, in what is today south-eastern Norway. It consists of the Akershus municipalities Lillestrøm, Lørenskog, Nittedal, Rælingen and Aurskog-Høland in the southern end (Nedre Romerike), and Ullensaker, Gjerdrum, Nannestad, Nes, Eidsvoll and Hurdal in the northern end (Øvre Romerike).

== Etymology ==
The Old Norse form of the name was Raumaríki, but the name must be much older (see below). The first element is the genitive plural of raumr m ("person from Romerike"); the final element is ríki n ("realm"; cf. Ringerike, Rånrike). In the Hversu Noregr byggdist and in Thorsteins saga Víkingssonar, the name is attributed to the mythical king Raum the Old (Raumr inn gamli). According to the latter saga, the members of the family were big and ugly, and because of this big and ugly people were called "great Raumar".

The name may ultimately be derived from Raum elfr, which was an old name for the Glomma river.

The linguistic similarity to the place name "Romerriket" (Norwegian for "the Roman Empire") is coincidental.

== History ==
Øvre Romerike Nedre Romerike

Before the unification of Norway by King Harald Fairhair, Romerike was a petty kingdom. It had its age of greatness between the 5th and 7th centuries. The 6th century Goth scholar Jordanes wrote in his Getica about a tribe located in Scandza which he named the Raumarici and which seems to be the same name as Raumariki, the old name for Romerike.

In Beowulf and Widsith, the tribe is mentioned as the warlike Heaðo-Reamas (i.e. battling Reamas, for the correspondence between Reamas and Raumar compare Geatas and Gautar).

Snorri Sturluson relates in his Heimskringla that it was ruled by the semi-legendary Swedish kings, Sigurd Hring and Ragnar Lodbrok during the 8th century.

In the 9th century, Halfdan the Black, the father of King Harald Fairhair, subdued the area by defeating and killing the previous ruler, Sigtryg, in battle. He then defeated Sigtryg's brother and successor Eystein in a series of battles.

After the death of Halfdan the Black, Romerike submitted to the Swedish king Erik Eymundsson. However, it was forcibly conquered by Harald Fairhair who spent a summer there, to ensure that Romerike was integrated into his newly-created kingdom of Norway.

The centre of the kingdom and the earliest settlements were at Sand, between Jessheim and Garder, where the soil was easiest to cultivate and the surrounding forests were rich in game animals.

=== Kings of Raumariki ===
- Raum the Old
- Eystein Halfdansson
- Halfdan the Mild
- Sigtryg Eysteinsson
- Eystein Eysteinsson, brother of Sigtryg
- Halfdan the Black
- Erik Eymundsson

== Raknehaugen ==
Rakni's Mound (Raknehaugen) has been estimated to date to around 550 AD (possibly 552 AD). It is located in the very heart of Romerike. Raknehaugen is a burial mound (gravhaug) from the Old Norse word haugr meaning barrow or mound. It is assumed that it is named after a king with the name Rakni. At 77 metres in diameter and more than 15 metres high, Raknehaugen at Ullensaker is the largest barrow in Northern Europe.

== Other sources ==
- De Geer, Ebba Hult Raknehaugen (A.W. Bråggers. 1938)
- Grieg, Sigurd Raknehaugen (Viking 5 – Norsk Arkeologisk Selskap, Oslo. 1941)
- Skre, Dagfinn Raknehaugen - en empirisk loftsrydning (Viking 60 – Norsk Arkeologisk Selskap, Oslo. 1997)
