= Karl Hundason =

Karl Hundason, also Karl Hundisson, is a personage in the Orkneyinga Saga. The saga recounts a war between Thorfinn Sigurdsson, Earl of Orkney, and Karl, whom it calls king of Scots. The question of his identity and historicity has been debated by historians of Scotland and the Northern Isles for more than a century. However a literal translation suggests that the name may simply be an insult.

== Saga ==
The Orkneyinga Saga says that a dispute between Thorfinn Sigurdsson and Karl Hundason began when Karl Hundason became "King of Scots" and claimed Caithness. According to the Orkneyinga Saga, in the war which followed, Thorfinn defeated Karl in a sea-battle off Deerness at the east end of the Orkney Mainland. Then Karl's nephew Mutatan or Muddan, appointed to rule Caithness for him, was killed at Thurso by Thorkel the Fosterer. Finally, a great battle at Tarbat Ness on the south side of the Dornoch Firth ended with Karl defeated and fugitive or dead. Thorfinn, the saga says, then marched south through Scotland as far as Fife, burning and plundering as he passed. A later note in the saga claims that Thorfinn won nine Scottish earldoms.

Whoever Karl son of Hundi may have been, it is thought that the saga is reporting a local conflict, perhaps with a Scots ruler of Moray or Ross:

[T]he whole narrative is consistent with the idea that the struggle of Thorfinn and Karl is a continuation of that which had been waged since the ninth century by the Orkney earls, notably Sigurd Rognvald's son, Ljot, and Sigurd the Stout, against the princes or mormaers of Moray, Sutherland, Ross, and Argyll, and that, in fine, Malcolm and Karl were mormaers of one of these four provinces.

== Interpretations ==
The identity of Karl Hundason, unknown to Scots and Irish sources, has long been a matter of dispute.

William Forbes Skene in his Highlanders of Scotland attempted to reconcile the conflicting witnesses of the Irish annals and the sagas. Skene's proposal was that Karl (or Kali) Hundason should be identified with one "Malcolm MacKenneth", a son of Kenneth III of Scotland (Cináed mac Duib), presented as the successor of Malcolm II (Máel Coluim mac Cináeda) in the northern parts of the kingdom while Duncan I (Donnchad mac Crínáin) ruled in the south. This theory was criticised by Robertson as being unnecessarily complex. Instead Robertson proposed that Hundason should be identified with Duncan I. The most popular candidate to be Karl Hundason is King Macbeth (Mac Bethad mac Findláich), whose father may be called "jarl Hundi" in Njál's saga.

However, the existence of Karl Hundason rests solely on the Orkneyinga saga, and more particularly on those elements of Arnórr jarlaskáld's Þórfinnsdrápa which are preserved in the saga. A degree of scepticism has been expressed by many writers from Robertson onwards, some going to so far as to suggest that the whole episode is poetic invention. Most recently Alex Woolf has suggested that the identity of Karl Hundason has been in plain sight all along. The Saga, when dealing with Thorfinn's childhood, mentions a brother named "Hvelp or Hundi" who was taken to Norway by King Olaf Trygvasson and died there. Woolf proposes that Karl Hundason, rather that being some hitherto unknown Scots king, was the son of Thorfinn's brother Hlodver Hundi. However, Thomson had already discussed this possibility in 2001, and urged caution as both Orkenyinga saga and St Olaf's saga suggest he only lived "a short while" and was unlikely to have had a son himself.

Muir (2005) points out that a literal translation of "Karl Hundisson" is "peasant son-of-a-dog", an insult that may have been obvious to Norse-speakers hearing the saga and that "we can assume this wasn't his real name". The implication is that there is no purpose in seeking phonetic parallels with known Scots personages. Thomson points out that both "Karl" and Hundi" are names used in other contexts without disparaging intentions although the combination is otherwise unknown.
