= Rögnvald Brusason =

Earl of Orkney

Rognvald Brusason
- Earl of Orkney

Earl of Orkney (Jointly with Thorfinn the Mighty)
- Reign: c. 1037 – 1046
- Predecessor: Brusi Sigurdsson
- Successor: Thorfinn the Mighty
- Other titles: Lord of the Shetlanders (attributed)
- Died: 1046 (December); Papa Stronsay, Orkney
- Buried: Papa Westray, Orkney
- Noble family: House of Sigurd (Earls of Orkney)
- Father: Brusi Sigurdsson

Rognvald Brusason (died 1046), son of Brusi Sigurdsson, was Earl of Orkney jointly with Thorfinn Sigurdsson from about 1037 onwards. He could possibly be the grandfather of Magnus Barelegs through an unnamed daughter. His life is recorded in the Orkneyinga Saga.

== History ==
Rognvald was taken by his father to Norway, to the court of Olaf Haraldsson, when Brusi and Thorfinn went there to have the inheritance of Einar Wry-mouth's third-share of the Earldom settled. Olaf kept Einar's share for himself, appointing Brusi to administer it, and kept Rognvald at his court.

The Orkneyinga Saga says of Rognvald:

Rognvald was one of the handsomest of men, with a fine head of golden hair, smooth as silk. At an early age he grew to be tall and strong, earning a great reputation for his shrewdness and courtesy ...

Rognvald was a supporter of Olaf Haraldsson, later Saint Olaf, sharing his exile in Kievan Rus, and helping his brother Harald Sigurdsson, better known as Harald Hardraade, escape after the Battle of Stiklestad in 1030. While Harald went on to Constantinople, Rognvald and other exiles remained in Rus, in the service of Yaroslav the Wise. Rognvald returned to Norway with Olaf's son Magnus the Good in 1035.

While Rognvald was abroad, his father had died and Thorfinn Sigurdsson was ruling all of the Earldom of Orkney. Rognvald asked King Magnus for his third part of the Earldom, and Magnus agreed, giving him three ships and granting him the stewardship of Magnus's own third share. When Rognvald arrived in Orkney, he sent to his uncle Thorfinn asking him for the two thirds of the Earldom which Magnus had given him. Thorfinn agreed to give Rognvald his father's third, and the third which Magnus claimed into the bargain, although he claimed not to recognise Magnus's claim and presented this as a gift in return for Rognvald's assistance. Thorfinn and Rognvald worked closely together for eight years, fighting against enemies in the Hebrides and raiding Scotland and England.

However, the earls eventually fell out. The proximate cause of their quarrel, according to the saga, was the arrival of Kalf Arnesson, the uncle of Thorfinn's wife Ingibiorg Finnsdottir.

Kalf had a large following which placed a heavy burden on the Earl's finances. Plenty of people told him that he shouldn't let Rognvald have two-thirds of the islands, considering his heavy outlay.

Rognvald and Kalf Arnesson were not friends. The Orkneyinga Saga reports that Rognvald, a staunch supporter of Saint Olaf, came close to attacking Kalf in Rus, who alone among the Arnessons had betrayed Olaf, when he came to pledge his support to Magnus. For that reason, if for no other, Rognvald refused to hand over the third which Thorfinn asked for. From then onwards, relations deteriorated. Rognvald was defeated in a sea-battle and sought refuge in Norway with Magnus while Thorfinn took control of the earldom.

With a single ship, and a crew of picked men, Rognvald returned to Orkney hoping that surprise would enable him to retake the earldom. He succeeded, but not entirely as Thorfinn was able to flee to Caithness. However, soon afterwards, Rognvald was surprised in his turn, but was killed by Thorkell the Fosterer while escaping, given away by the barking of his lap dog.

Rognvald was buried on Papa Westray. The Orkneyinga Saga offers this assessment of Rognvald: 'Everyone agrees that of all the Earls of Orkney he was the most popular and gifted, and his death was mourned by many."

== Insular geography ==
Although the Orkenyinga saga frequently mentions placenames it is largely silent on the subject of how the joint earldoms functioned on a geographical basis. It is possible that Brusi Sigurdsson's share, described as the "northernmost part of the isles", was those islands lying north of the Orkney mainland, that his brother Einar "Wry-mouth" Sigurdsson's was originally the east Mainland and the south isles and that Sumarlidi Sigurdsson's was the west Mainland.This theory, based on the Orcadian distribution of ouncelands was originally researched by J. Storer Clouston in the 1920s and was "enormously influential" but also "preposterous" according to Smith (1988). However, it is also possible that Brusi's share was Shetland, which formed part of the earldom throughout the Norse period. This possibility is supported by a later reference to Rognvald as "Lord of the Shetlanders" and Thompson (2008) is in "no doubt " that Shetland was in Brusi's possession. It is likely that Fair Isle marked the boundary between these shares both then and during later joint earldoms.

== Legacy ==
Twelfth-century Earl Kali Kolsson was given the name Rognvald "because Kali's mother claimed that Rognvald Brusason had been the most able of all the Earls of Orkney, and people saw this as a sign of good luck."

The Orkneyinga Saga is largely silent regarding Rognvald's personal life and there is no mention of a marriage or children. However, Anders Stølen has argued that Magnus Barelegs's mother, whose identity is uncertain, was a daughter of "Ragnvald jarl" as stated in the genealogical text Sunnmørsættleggen. This Ragnvald has in turn been identified as Rognvald Brusason by Ola Kvalsund.
