= Ragnhild Eriksdotter =

Norwegian princess (died c. 984)

- Spouse: Arnfinn Thorfinnsson, Havard Thorfinnsson, Liot Thorfinnsson, Hlodvir Thorfinnsson
- Issue: Sigurd Hlodvirsson
- Father: Eric Bloodaxe
- Mother: Gunnhild, Mother of Kings

Ragnhild Eriksdotter (died c. 984) was the daughter of Eric Bloodaxe and his wife, Gunnhild. According to the Orkneyinga Saga, she was an ambitious and scheming woman who sought power through the men of the family of Thorfinn Torf-Einarsson, who was Earl of Orkney. The period after Thorfinn's death was one of dynastic strife.

Thorfinn had five sons: (Arnfinn, Havard, Hlodvir, Ljot, Skuli) and at least two daughters, each of whom had a son called Einar. In Orkneyinga Saga it is stated that Ragnhild Eriksdotter first married Arnfinn Thorfinnsson, eldest son of Thorfinn. Her husband was subsequently murdered at Murkle in Caithness sometime around 979.

Her next husband was Arnfinn's brother, Havard Thorfinnsson who may have been involved in his brother's murder. Havard became Earl of Orkney and promptly married his brother's widow. Next Ragnhild convinced Thorfinn's grandson, Einar Klining, to kill Havard for which she would marry him and make him Earl. Havard was killed in Stenness, Orkney, though the date is uncertain. Before Einar Klining could marry her, Ragnhild had promised Einar Hardkiopt, another grandson of Thorfinn, the same thing, if he would kill Einar Klining. This he did, but then Ragnhild took Havard's younger brother Liot Thorfinnsson as her husband. After Liot went on to defend Orkney and claim the Earldom, he died of his wounds from the battle of Skidmoor in Caithness. Not much more is heard of Ragnhild after that event. As Ragnhild took her final husband Hlodvir Thorfinnsson. He then became Earl of Orkney. In time, he was succeeded by his son, Sigurd the Stout (her possible son).

== Other sources ==
- Crawford, Barbara E. (1987) Scandinavian Scotland (Leicester University Press) ISBN 0-7185-1197-2
- Muir, Tom (2005) Orkney in the Sagas: The Story of the Earldom of Orkney as told in the Icelandic Sagas (The Orcadian. Kirkwall) ISBN 0954886232.
- Pálsson, Hermann and Edwards, Paul Geoffrey (1981) Saga: The History of the Earls of Orkney (Penguin Classics) ISBN 0-14-044383-5
- Thomson, William P. L. (2008) The New History of Orkney (Edinburgh. Birlinn) ISBN 978-1-84158-696-0
