= Thorfinn Torf-Einarsson =

10th-century Earl of Orkney

- Earl of Orkney
- Title held: ? to 963
- Predecessor: Torf-Einarr
- Successor: Arnfinn Thorfinnsson
- Native name: Þorfinnr hausakljúfr - Thorfinn Skull-splitter
- Died: c. 963
- Buried: Hoxa, Orkney
- Noble family: Norse Earls of Orkney
- Spouse: Grelad
- Issue: Arnfinn, Havard, Hlodvir, Ljot, Skuli and 2 daughters
- Father: Torf-Einarr Rognvaldsson
- Mother: Unknown

Thorfinn Torf-Einarsson also known as Thorfinn Skull-splitter (from the Old Norse Þorfinnr hausakljúfr) was a 10th-century Earl of Orkney. He appears in the Orkneyinga saga and briefly in St Olaf's Saga, as incorporated into the Heimskringla. These stories were first written down in Iceland in the early 13th century and much of the information they contain is "hard to corroborate".

== Family ==
Thorfinn was the youngest son of Torf-Einarr, himself the son of Rognvald Eysteinsson, the first Earl of Orkney. Torf-Einarr had two other sons, Arnkel and Erlend who "fell in a war expedition" at an unspecified location in England along with Erik Bloodaxe, who was Torf-Einarr's kinsman through his sister Álöf who was married to Torf-Einarr's brother Thorir. Erik's widow, Gunnhildr then fled north to Orkney with her sons who used the islands as a base for summer raiding expeditions.

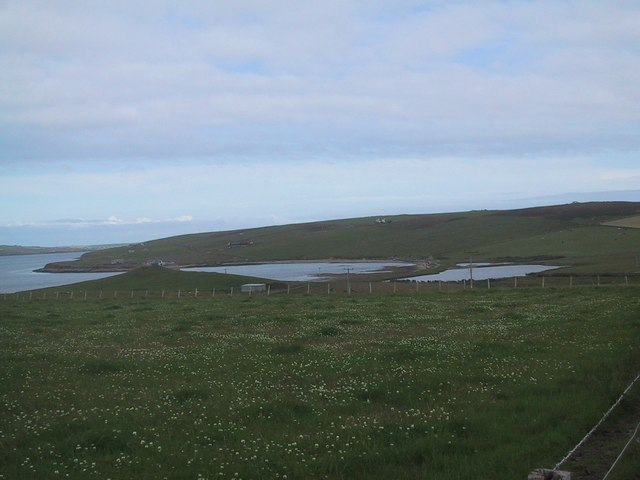
The site of The Howe of Hoxa broch (at left), Earl Thorfinn's supposed burial place

Thorfinn had five sons: Arnfinn, Havard, Hlodvir, Ljot, and Skuli. Their mother was Grelad, a daughter of "Earl Dungad of Caithness" and Groa, herself a daughter of Thorstein the Red. Grelad's Norse credentials were thus impressive, but it has been suggested that her connection to this "earl" of Caithness may have been more important for the Orkney earldom. It is likely that Dungad was a member of a pre-Norse era ruling family and that the marriage brought Groa's descendants within the Celtic derbfine and helped to legitimise their ambitions on the north mainland of Scotland. Thorfinn and Grelad also had two daughters whose names are not known, each of whom had a son called Einar - Einar kliningr ("Buttered-bread") and Einar harðkjotr ("Hard-mouth").

Gunnhildr and her family later set out for Norway, but before they left they "gave" their daughter Ragnhild Eriksdotter to Arnfinn Thorfinnsson in marriage. In the later days of Thorfinn's rule, the sons of Eric Bloodaxe fled Norway and returned to Orkney where they "committed great excesses".

== Death and legacy ==
Thorfinn Torf-Einarsson lived to be an old man and may have died c. 963 "on a bed of sickness". He is said to have been buried at the broch site at Howe of Hoxa on South Ronaldsay. According to St Olaf's Saga his sons became Earls after him but the earldom was then beset by dynastic strife.

Ragnhild had her husband Arnfinn killed at Murkle in Caithness and married his brother Havard "Harvest-happy" who then ruled as earl for a time. Not content with this new arrangement Ragnhild then conspired with her nephew Einar kliningr, who killed Havard at the battle of Havarðsteiger near Stenness. Einar and Ragnhild then fell out and the latter persuaded Einar harðkjotr to attack and kill his cousin Einar kliningr in turn. Ragnhild's ambitions were still not assuaged and this "female spider" then colluded with Ljot Thorfinnson whom she married and then he had the second Einar killed. Having now married three of Thorfinn's sons in succession no more is told of Ragnhild and Ljot became earl and an "excellent leader".

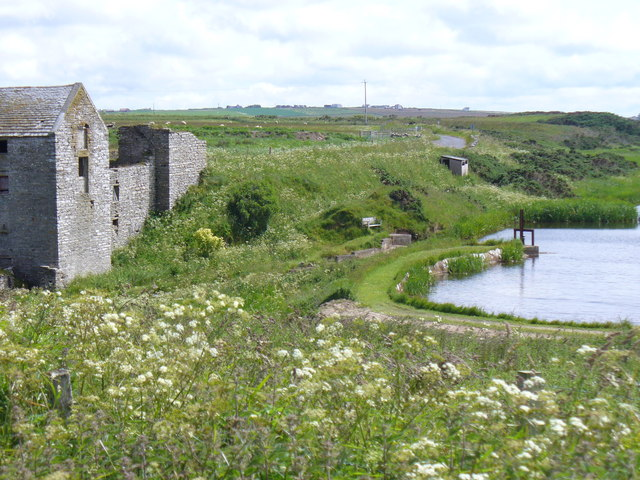
The old watermill and mill pond at Ham, Caithness

Skuli gave allegiance to the Scots king who gave him the title Earl of Orkney but he never gained control of the islands, being killed in battle against Ljot in the Dales of Caithness at which Ljot "fought like a hero". Ljot then took control of Caithness but this angered the Scots and the Mormaer of Moray brought a large army north. They engaged in battle at Skitten Mire (now called the Moss of Killimister) near Wick and although outnumbered Ljot had the victory. However he later died of wounds suffered there and "people thought it a great loss". (Note: Canmore state that the battle at Skitten Mire took place "between 943 and 945" although this does not square with Earl Thorfinn dying c. 963.) Hlodvir then became earl and "ruled alone over this country". Hlodvir ruled well and married Eithne, daughter of Kjarvalr, King of Ireland. Hlodvir died in his bed and was buried at Ham in Caithness. He was succeeded as earl by his son Sigurd.

The modern Orcadian beer Skull Splitter is named after Thorfinn.

== Interpretations ==
Kjarvalr Írakonungr appears in the Landnámabók and has been identified as Cerball mac Dúnlainge, King of Osraige who died in 888. There is clearly a chronological problem with Earl Hlodvir, whose son Sigurd was killed at Clontarf in 1014, marrying the daughter of a king who died more than 120 years before that. Furthermore, Thorstein "the Red" Olafsson (fl. late 9th century and Hlodvir's great-grandfather) was apparently married to a granddaughter of Kjarvalr. Woolf (2007) concludes that the saga writers may have confused this story about the provenance of Sigurd Hlodvirsson with one about Thorstein, a close ally of Sigurd Eysteinsson.

Thomson (2008) concludes that there is "no real reason to trust the details of this bloodthirsty story" about Thorfinn's children, and speculates about the saga writer's intentions. The joint rulership of earls was a recurring theme in the period up to 1214 and was "inherently unstable and usually ended in violence". He identifies these family feuds as being the main theme of the Orkneyinga saga, culminating in the martyrdom of St Magnus c.1115, and that the writer is emphasising the doom of "kin-slaying". The connection with Erik Bloodaxe may also have been made to illustrate the continuing influence of the Norwegian ruling families in Orcadian affairs, which lessened in the late 10th century when Scandinavian expeditions tended to be directed towards England "by-passing Orkney and allowing the earls greater scope for independent action". In this context Ragnhild may have been not so much the cause of the Thorfinsson's troubles as the "prize for the winner".

Although he never became de facto earl, Skuli Thorfinsson's relationship with the Scots offers some insight into the politics of the north of Scotland in the late tenth century. In the Orkneyinga saga it is claimed that he requested the support of the "king of Scots" for his claim to Caithness. However it is far from certain that the kings of Scots were in a position to offer any authority so far north at this time. The Irish annalists referred to the rulers of Moray by the title Ri Alban and it is possible that the saga writer meant the former by this term. Crawford (1987) suggests that "if the late ninth-century conquest of northern Scotland by Thorstein the Red and Sigurd the Mighty had indeed led to permanent colonies in Caithness and along the coastal areas of Sutherland, then the late tenth century struggle may have been a result of aggression from the Scottish side in an attempt to regain control of the northernmost province of the Scottish mainland".

== See also ==
- Battle of Stainmore - where Erik Bloodaxe was killed. Arnkel and Erlend Torf-Einarsson are not mentioned by the Northumbrian sources that record this event.
- Stone Lud, said to mark the grave of Ljot Thorfinnson.
