= Brusi Sigurdsson =

- Earl of Orkney
- Title held: 1014 to the early 1030s, jointly with his three brothers
- Predecessor: Sigurd Hlodvirsson
- Successor: Thorfinn Sigurdsson
- Died: before 1035
- Noble family: Norse Earls of Orkney
- Spouse: Unknown
- Issue: Rögnvald
- Father: Sigurd Hlodvirsson
- Mother: Unknown

Brusi Sigurdsson (died between 1030 and 1035) was one of Sigurd Hlodvirsson's four sons (together with Thorfinn, Einar and Sumarlidi). He was joint Earl of Orkney from 1014. His life is recorded in the Orkneyinga Saga.

== Sources ==
The sources for Sigurd's life are almost exclusively Norse sagas, none of which were written down at the time of the events they record. The main source is the Orkneyinga Saga, which was first compiled in Iceland in the early 13th century and much of the information it contains is "hard to corroborate".

== Family background ==
The Orkneyinga Saga reports that when their father Earl Sigurd was killed at the Battle of Clontarf in 1014, the Norse earldom was divided between his three oldest sons, Brusi, Sumarlidi, and Einar "Wry-Mouth". The youngest son Thorfinn was only five years old and being fostered by his maternal grandfather Malcolm II of Scotland on the Scottish mainland who gave him the earldom of Caithness, which Sigurd had held from the Scottish crown. Brusi is described as "gentle, restrained, unassuming and a fine speaker". Sumarlidi was the oldest of the brothers and had a similar disposition to Brusi. Einar, on the other hand was "ruthless and grasping, a hard and successful fighting man".

== Joint rule ==
=== With Sumarlidi and Einar ===
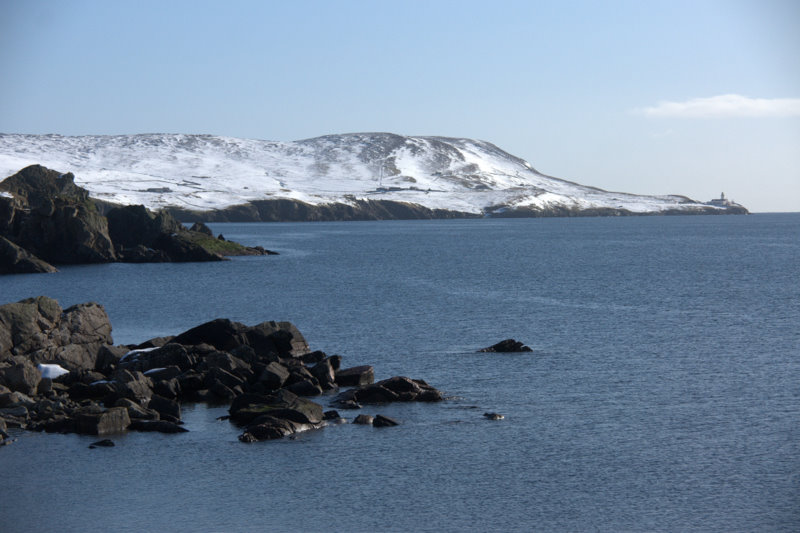
Bressay in winter

Joint earldoms were a frequent feature of the Norse earldom of Orkney and usually one of the partners was recognised as the senior figure, responsible for military activities. However, such arrangements were often unstable and the Orkneyinga saga is less than explicit about how these shares were divided up geographically. It is possible that Brusi's share, described as the "northernmost part of the isles", was those islands lying north of the Orkney mainland, that Einar's was originally the east Mainland and the south isles and that Sumarlidi's was the west Mainland. However, it is also possible that Brusi's share was Shetland, which formed part of the earldom throughout the Norse period. This possibility is supported by a later reference to his son Rögnvald as "Lord of the Shetlanders" and Thompson (2008) is in "no doubt " that Shetland was in Brusi's possession. (Note: Earl Sigurd also had territories in the Hebrides and possibly Ireland that had been obtained by conquest and it is likely these were subsequently controlled by Einar.) The Shetland island of Bressay may have been recorded in 1263 as Breiðoy (Old Norse "broad island"). However, in a 1490 document the island is referred to as Brwsøy - "Brusi's island" which name may indicate it was Earl Brusi's 11th century base.

Sumarlidi died in his bed not long after his father. Einar took his share, ruling two-thirds of the Earldom with the remaining third held by Brusi. Einar soon became unpopular, demanding heavy taxes and frequent military service from the farmers, and gaining little booty on his raids. He was, the saga says, "a great bully", whereas Brusi was "well liked by everyone".

=== With Einar and Thorfinn ===
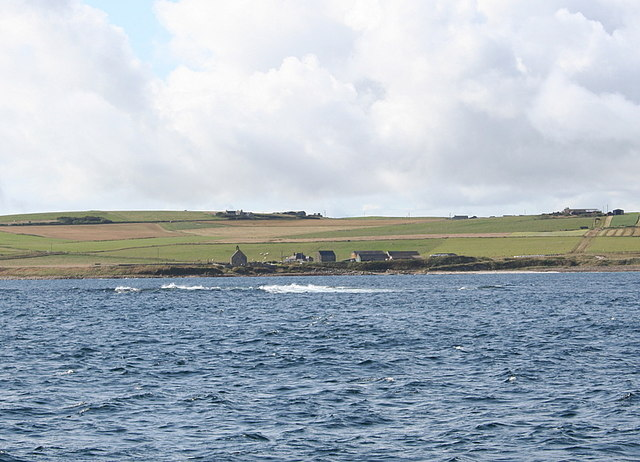
Looking towards Skaill, Deerness, the site of Thorkel Fosterer's hall, Hlaupandanes, on the east coast of mainland Orkney.

Thorfinn was "greedy and ambitious" like Einar and Brusi had to make peace between the two when Thorfinn grew to manhood, not once but twice. On coming of age Thorfinn asked for Sumarlidi's third from Einar but the latter refused. Both raised an army so Brusi also raised a force to come between them. He forged a peace treaty in which it was agreed that Thorfinn should get his third and that on the death of either of the other two brothers, the surviving one would inherit their share. Thorfinn remained in Caithness and appointed stewards to look after his Orkney possessions. (Note: Dating Thorfinn's assumption of the earldom is troublesome. The Heimskringla states that Thorfinn was 5 years old when his father Sigurd was killed at Clontarf, reliably dated to 1014. "When Thorfinn came of age he asked Earl Einar for a third of the islands" and it is clear from the text of the Orkneyinga saga that Einar, Brusi and Thorfinn were joint earls for a period. Muir (2005) is clear that Einar died in October 1020 but if Thorfinn was five years old in 1014 this would have made him only eleven by then. A rather earlier birth date for Thorfinn is thus implied, with a coming of age c. 1018. Similarly, Thorfinn is often stated as dying c. 1064, although Woolf (2007) states that "there is no reason why a date in the late 1050s is not just as credible.") On one occasion he sent Thorkel Fosterer to collect his taxes but Einar drove him out of the islands back to Caithness. Thorfinn advised him to go to the court of King Olaf Haraldsson in Norway and subsequently Thorfinn was invited there too. They returned together in the summer of 1020 and landed in Orkney where they were met by Einar at the head of large armed force. Once again Brusi intervened and it was agreed that Einar and Thorkel would make peace and entertain one another to a feast.

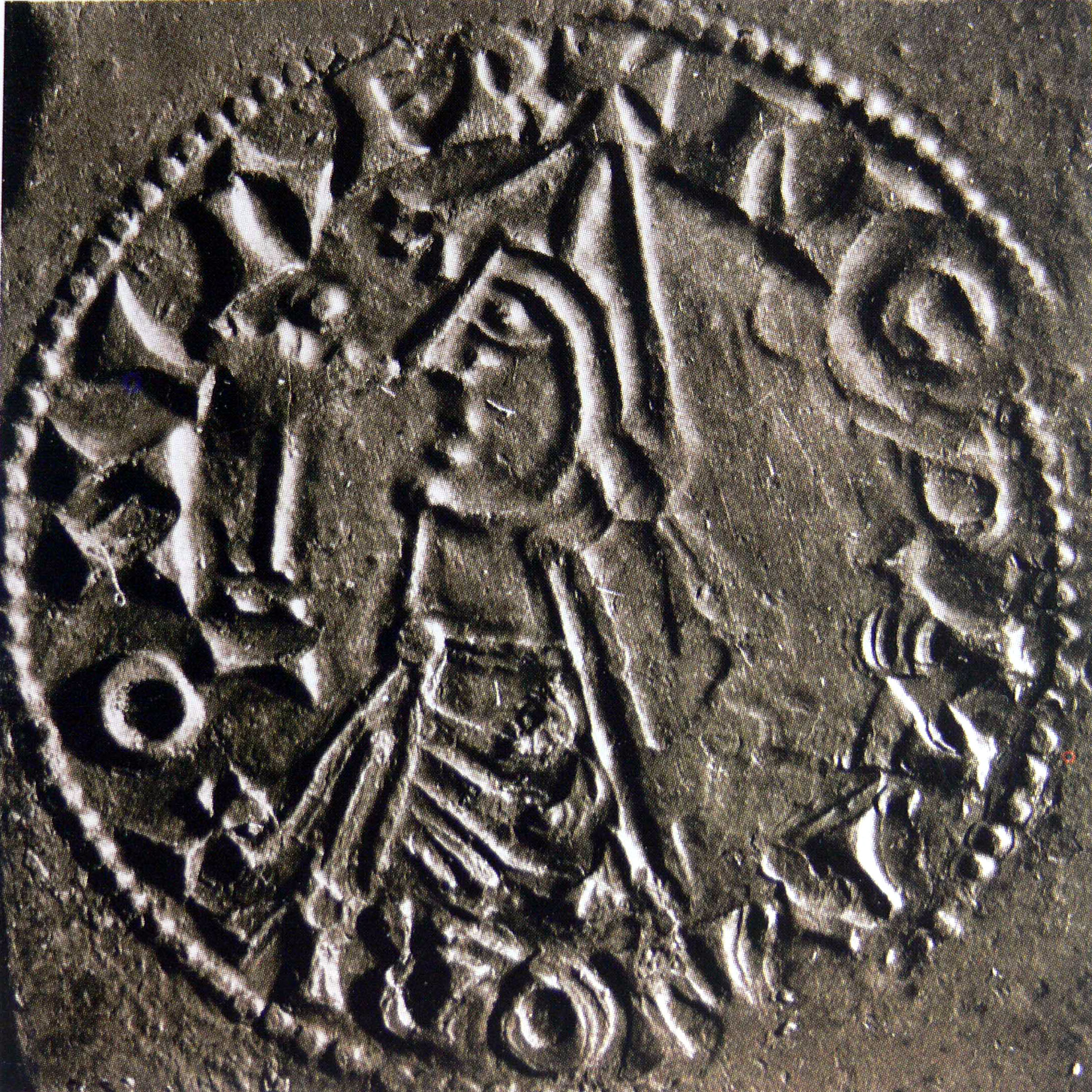
A coin from the reign of Olaf Haraldsson of Norway dated 1023–28.

In October 1020 Einar attended Thorkel's hall at Hlaupandanes in Deerness in a sour mood. On the last day of the feast Thorkel was supposed to travel with Einar for the reciprocal event but the former's spies reported that ambushes were in place en route. Thorkel therefore delayed his departure, leaving Einar to wait for his arrival by the fire in his great hall. Thorkel arrived by stealth, walked into the hall with one of his men and they killed Einar. Thorkel then escaped to Norway.

=== With Thorfinn ===
When Brusi inherited Einar's third of the earldom Thorfinn was not pleased with this arrangement, and asked Brusi for a half share. This Brusi refused. However, while Thorfinn could count on the aid of his maternal grandfather, Máel Coluim mac Cináeda, Brusi could rely only on his own resources.

To find support Brusi went to Norway, to the court of King Olaf, to have the sharing out of the Earldom settled and Thorfinn followed him there. Olaf forced both of them to accept his overlordship and kept Einar's share for himself, (as reparation for Einar's murder of Eyvind Aurochs-horn) appointing Brusi to administer it, and kept Brusi's two-year-old son Rögnvald at his court. Brusi later gave control of Einar's third of the islands to Thorfinn in return for his seeing to the defence of Orkney and Shetland. The Heimskringla then tells that at this time, when King Olaf was defeated by Cnut the Great and exiled to Russia, that he was joined there by Rögnvald Brusason. Rögnvald later fought in the Battle of Stiklestad in 1030 where Olaf was killed.

St Olaf's saga states that Brusi died at some point between the death of Olaf and before the close of Cnut's reign in 1035 and the Orkneyinga saga that he had died before his son Rögnvald accompanied Magnus the Good back to Norway.

== Succession ==
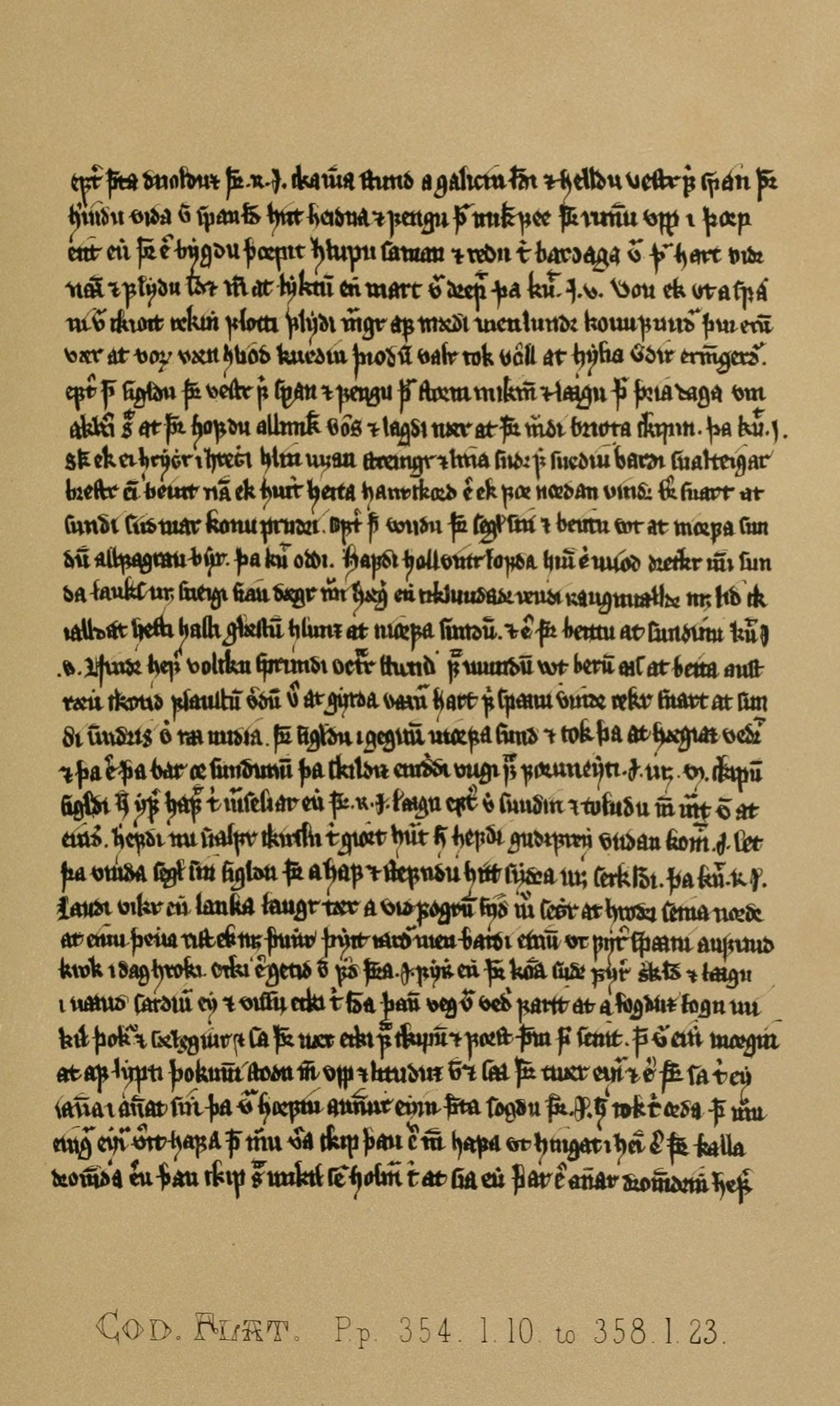
An example of a page from the Orkneyinga saga, as it appears in the 14th century Flatey Book.

On Brusi's death Thorfinn ruled the earldom alone until 1036 when, like his father before him, Rögnvald became joint earl. This was not however a peaceful partnership and Rögnvald was killed c. 1046. Orkneyinga saga recorded that "everyone agrees that of all the Earls of Orkney he was the most popular and gifted, and his death was mourned by many" but it was Thorfinn's line that would provide subsequent earls for the next two and a half centuries.

== Interpretations ==
The joint rulership of earls was a recurring theme in the period up to 1214 and was "inherently unstable and usually ended in violence". Thomson (2008) identifies these family feuds as being the main theme of the Orkneyinga saga, culminating in the martyrdom of St Magnus c.1115, and that the writer emphasises the doom of "kin-slaying" at various points in the story. In this case the Sigurdsson brothers do not assassinate one another, but rather Thorkel Fosterer becomes an intermediary, killing both Einar rangmunnr and, at a later date, Rögnvald Brusasson on behalf of Thorfinn Sigurdsson. It is also clear that there is a moral element to the tale, with Brusi cast as the peacemaker who is father to the noble Rögnvald and who stands in contrast to his grasping brother and half-brother. Nonetheless, Brusi has a relatively minor role to play compared to Thorfinn "the Mighty", whose conquests included expansion well into north mainland Scotland and whose rule may have marked the zenith of Scandinavian influence in Scotland.

Brusi's story also includes another recurring aspect of the saga, relations with Norway. Crawford (1987) observes several sub-themes: "submission and of overlordship; the problem of dual allegiance and the threat of the earls looking to the kings of Scots as an alternative source of support; the Norwegian kings' use of hostages; and their general aim of attempting to turn the Orkney earls into royal officials bound to them by oaths of homage, and returning tribute to them on a regular basis." King Olaf was a "skilled practitioner" of divide and rule and the competing claims of Brusi and Thorfinn enabled him to take full advantage.

Thorfinn's journey in 1020 is the first occasion on which an earl of Orkney is known to have visited the royal court in Norway and the Icelandic Annals have little to say about Orkney. However, under the year 1021 it is said "Earl Thorfinn and earl Brusi, Sigurd's sons, gave the Orkneys into the power of King Olaf." Although the saga writer paints a vivid and plausible picture of the scene, this "merely tell us that the thirteenth-century saga writer knew his Orkney traditions and the recurring factors which did indeed come to the fore on occasions during the thirteenth century when the kings and earls fought or negotiated from their related positions of strength".

== Citations ==
Preceded by Sigurd Hlodvisson	Earl of Orkney; 1014–c.1030^{with Sumarlidi Sigurdsson 1014–1015}^{with Einar Sigurdsson 1014–1020}^{with Thorfinn Sigurdsson c.1018–c.1030}	Succeeded by Thorfinn Sigurdsson
