= Hoxa, Orkney =

Coordinates: 58.826°N 2.999°W

Hoxa
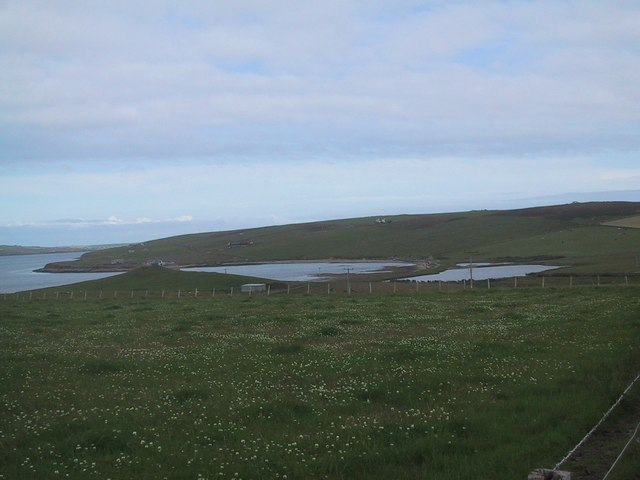
- The site of The Howe of Hoxa broch (at left)

- Location within Orkney
- OS grid reference: HY423935
- Civil parish: South Ronaldsay and Burray
- Council area: Orkney
- Lieutenancy area: Orkney
- Country: Scotland
- Sovereign state: United Kingdom
- Post town: ORKNEY
- Postcode district: KW17
- Dialling code: 01856
- Police: Scotland
- Fire: Scottish
- Ambulance: Scottish
- UK Parliament: Orkney and Shetland
- Scottish Parliament: Orkney

Hoxa is a small settlement on the island of South Ronaldsay in the Orkney Islands north of mainland Scotland. Hoxa is located 1 1/4 miles (2.0 km) west of St Margaret's Hope at the end of the B9043 road.

Thorfinn Turf-Einarsson the 10th-century Norse Earl of Orkney (aka Thorfinn Skullsplitter) may be buried at the site of The Howe broch, just north of Hoxa.
