= Thorfinn the Mighty =

11th-century Earl of Orkney

Thorfinn Sigurdsson
- Earl of Orkney
- Title held: c. 1016 to c. 1058. Jointly with Brusi Sigurdsson and Einar Sigurdsson to 1020, with Brusi to 1031, alone to 1036, with Rögnvald Brusason 1036 to 1046, alone to c. 1058
- Predecessor: Sigurd Hlodvirsson
- Successor: Paul and Erlend Thorfinnsson
- Native name: Þorfinnr inn riki – "Thorfinn the Mighty"
- Born: 1009? (Note: The Heimskringla states that Thorfinn was 5 years old when his father Sigurd was killed at Clontarf, reliably dated to 1014 but see main text for a discussion of the chronological issues.)
- Died: c. 1058?
- Noble family: Norse Earls of Orkney
- Spouse: Ingibiorg Finnsdottir
- Issue: Paul and Erlend Thorfinnsson
- Father: Sigurd Hlodvirsson
- Mother: Olith, daughter of Máel Coluim II of Scotland

Thorfinn Sigurdsson (1009? – c. 1058?), also known as Thorfinn the Mighty (Old Norse: Þorfinnr inn riki), was an 11th-century Jarl of Orkney. He was the youngest of five sons of Jarl Sigurd Hlodvirsson and the only one resulting from Sigurd's marriage to a daughter of Malcolm II of Scotland. He ruled alone as jarl for about a third of the time that he held the title and jointly with one or more of his brothers or with his nephew Rögnvald Brusason for the remainder. Thorfinn married Ingibiorg Finnsdottir, daughter of Finn Arnesson, Jarl of Halland.

Though Thorfinn's year of death is unknown, it is recorded that he died before King Harald's invasion of England in 1066. However, two pieces of circumstantial evidence may well point to a death date of around 1058: firstly, that in that year, King Harald's elder son Magnus Haraldsson (the future King Magnus II) led an expedition to Orkney and the Isles, which is speculated to have been an effort to restore order there following Thorfinn's death - at which point, his sons Paul and Erlend, would have been minors. Secondly, as King Malcolm III later married Thorfinn's widow Ingibiorg Finnsdottir and had at least two sons by her - King Duncan II and Donald (both born c1060) - then this marriage must have taken place before or around 1060, otherwise the chronology simply doesn't add up. Therefore, given the limited historical information available, a proposed death date of c1058 for Thorfinn would make the most sense.

The Heimskringla of Icelandic historian Snorri Sturluson, and the anonymous compiler of the Orkneyinga Saga wrote that Thorfinn was the most powerful of all the jarls of Orkney and that he ruled substantial territories beyond the Northern Isles. A sizeable part of the latter saga's account concerns his wars with a "King of Scots" named Karl Hundason whose identity is uncertain. In his later years he went on a pilgrimage to Rome and he was instrumental in making Orkney and Shetland part of mainstream Christendom. On his death in the latter half of the 11th century he was followed as earl by his sons Paul and Erlend.

There are numerous problems associated with the chronology of Thorfinn's life and in identifying his relationships to the southern polities of the Kingdom of Alba (the precursor to modern Scotland) and the Kingdom of Moray. His diplomacy with the Norwegian court has also been interpreted in various ways. His life has been the subject of various works of historical fiction.

== Sources ==
The sources for Thorfinn's life are almost exclusively Norse sagas, which were written down long after the time of the events in his life they record. The main sources are St Olaf's saga and the more detailed Orkneyinga Saga, which were first compiled in Iceland in the early 13th century. Much of the information the latter contains is "hard to corroborate" although it is a "generally credible" narrative in this context.

== Background ==
Thorfinn was the youngest of the five known sons of Earl Sigurd Hlodvirsson, but the only son of Sigurd's marriage to an unknown daughter of King Malcolm II (Máel Coluim mac Cináeda). His elder half-brothers Einar, Brusi and Sumarlidi survived to adulthood, while another brother called Hundi died young in Norway, a hostage at the court of King Olaf Trygvasson.

The locations of Orkney, Shetland, the Hebrides, Mann and various mainland territories in the late 11th century

Earl Sigurd was killed at the Battle of Clontarf on 23 April 1014. Before setting out for Ireland, he had sent Thorfinn, then aged five, to be fostered by his maternal grandfather, the King of Scots. When the news of Sigurd's death came, Thorfinn's older half-brothers divided Orkney and Shetland between them. King Máel Coluim set Thorfinn up as ruler of Caithness and Sutherland with Scots advisors to rule for him. Earl Sigurd had also been a ruler of the Suðreyar but these holdings appear to have escaped the control of the earls of Orkney at the time of his death or shortly thereafter. (Note: Crawford (1987) states that there was a possible "collapse of the earls' control in the west" following the Battle of Clontarf although Thomson (2008) suggests Sigurd's son Einar rangmunnr may have inherited his father's territories in the Hebrides. There is no specific evidence that Einar ever claimed to be a ruler of the Suðreyar. He died c. 1025 and a late twelfth century Norwegian text claims that Håkon Eiriksson ruled the Western Isles from 1016–1030.)

The Orkneyinga Saga provides this description of Thorfinn:

He was unusually tall and strong, an ugly-looking man with a black head of hair, sharp features, a big nose and bushy eyebrows, a forceful man, greedy for fame and fortune. He did well in battle, for he was both a good tactician and full of courage.

== Joint rule ==
=== With Einar and Brusi ===
Joint earldoms were a frequent feature of the Norse earldom of Orkney, although the Orkneyinga saga is less than explicit about how these shares were divided up geographically. (Note: It is possible that Brusi's share, described as the "northernmost part of the isles", was those islands lying north of the Orkney mainland, that Einar's was originally the east Mainland and the south isles and that Sumarlidi's was the west Mainland. However, it is also possible that Brusi's share was Shetland, which formed part of the earldom throughout the Norse period. This possibility is supported by a later reference to his son Rögnvald as "Lord of the Shetlanders" and Thompson (2008) is in "no doubt " that Shetland was in Brusi's possession.) Sumarlidi died in his bed not long after his father, most likely no later than 1018 and Einar took his share, ruling two-thirds of the earldom with the remaining third held by Brusi. Einar soon became unpopular, demanding heavy taxes and frequent military service from the farmers, and gaining little booty on his raids. He was, the saga says, "a great bully", whereas Brusi was "well liked by everyone".

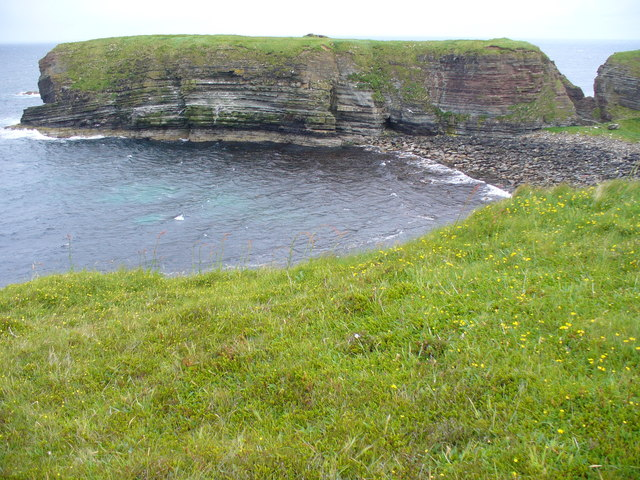
The Brough of Deerness - a Viking age ecclesiastical ruin here is associated with Thorkel Fosterer.

The farmers of the isles opposition to Einar's rule were led by Thorkel Amundason and, in danger of his life, he fled to Thorfinn's court in Caithness. He became his foster-father, hence his by-name, "Thorkel Fosterer". After Sumarlidi's death the disposition of his third share in Orkney and Shetland became a matter of dispute when Thorfinn claimed it as his. While Brusi was willing to grant it to him, Einar, who was "ruthless and grasping, a hard and successful fighting man" and somewhat like Thorfinn in temperament was not. Einar and Thorfinn each began raising an army to settle matters by force, but Earl Brusi made peace between them by raising his own men to come between them and then persuading Einar to give Thorfinn what he asked for. It was also agreed that on the death of either Brusi or Einar, the surviving brother would inherit the other's share.

Thorfinn appointed Thorkel Fosterer as his tax-gatherer in the islands, but Einar had not forgotten their earlier dispute and Thorkel again left the islands in fear of his life, returning to Thorfinn's base in Caithness (probably at Duncansby). Thorkel then travelled to Norway with Thorfinn's support, to meet with King Olaf Haraldsson. He was well received there, for Olaf bore his own grudge against Einar for the killing of his comrade Eyvind Aurochs-Horn some years earlier. Olaf invited Thorfinn to Norway, and he too was welcomed to Olaf's court. Thorfinn and Thorkel returned to Orkney to find Einar raising an army against them. Brusi again made peace between them, and it was agreed that Einar and Thorkel would entertain one another to a feast.

In October 1020 Einar attended Thorkel's hall at Hlaupandanes in Deerness in a sour mood. On the last day of the feast Thorkel was supposed to travel with Einar for the reciprocal event, however his spies reported to him that ambushes had been prepared against him along his route. Thorkel therefore delayed his departure, leaving Einar to wait for his arrival by the fire in his great hall. Thorkel arrived by stealth, walked into the hall with one of his men and they killed Einar. Thorkel then escaped to Norway.

=== With Brusi ===
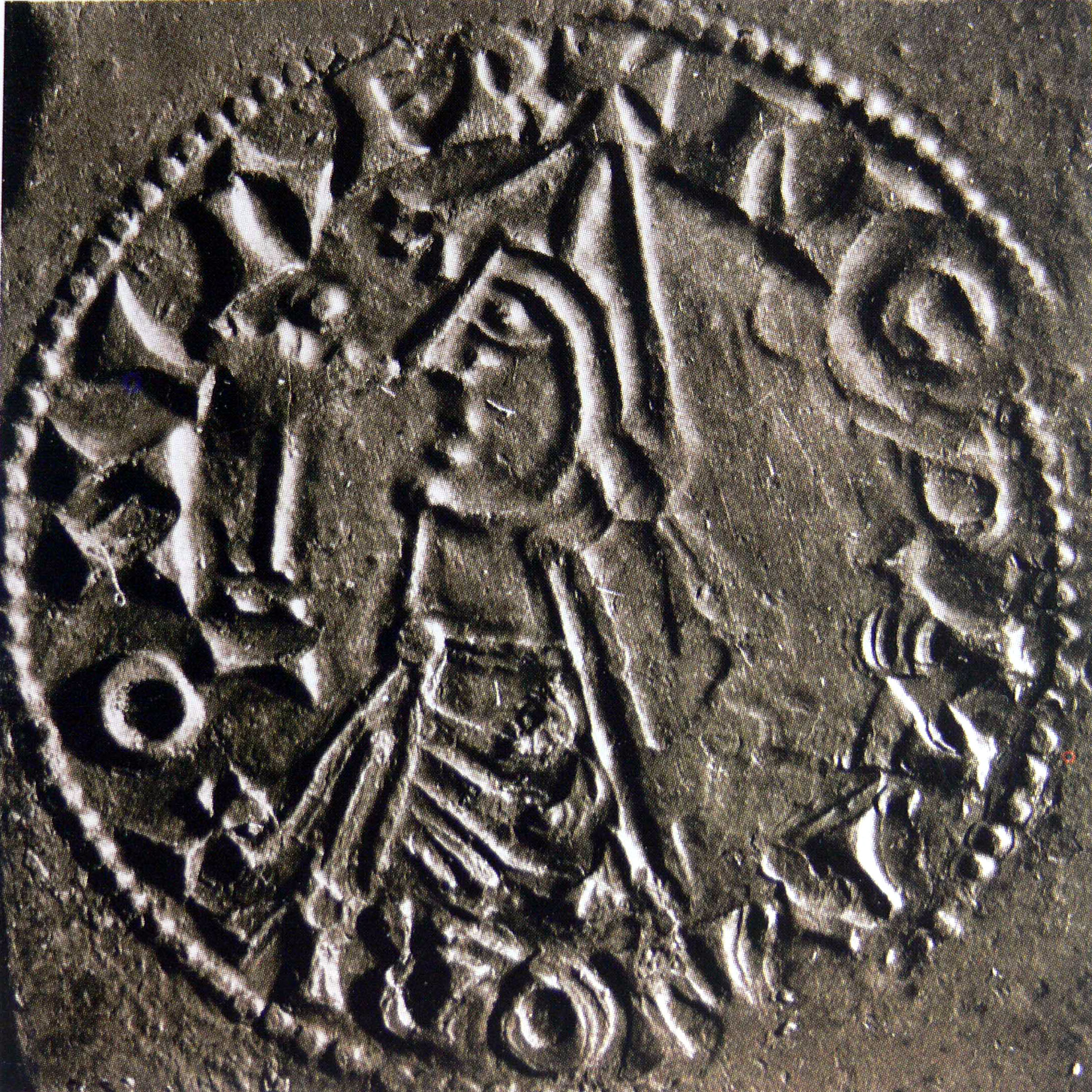
A coin from the reign of Olaf Haraldsson of Norway dated 1023–28.

The death of Einar did not end the dispute over Sumarlidi's third of the islands. Brusi considered that it belonged to him, as he and Einar had agreed when Thorfinn received a third of the islands. Thorfinn thought that the islands should be divided equally. However, Thorfinn could count on the assistance of his grandfather, King Malcolm, while Brusi had only the forces he could raise from his share of the islands, making any conflict a very unequal one. Brusi went to Norway to have King Olaf judge the dispute, and Thorfinn joined him there. Brusi surrendered the earldom to Olaf, who granted a third to each brother, and kept a third for himself. Thorfinn attempted to use his relationship with the King of Scots as a means to avoid acknowledging Olaf as his overlord in Orkney and Shetland, but Olaf threatened to appoint another to rule Thorfinn's share. Following Thorkel Fosterer's advice, Thorfinn agreed to Olaf's settlement. After Thorfinn left Norway, Olaf gave Brusi the disputed third to rule on his behalf, but kept Brusi's son Rognvald in Norway as a hostage. These events have been dated to 1021.

This arrangement lasted while Olaf was king but in 1030 he was overthrown by the Danish king Cnut the Great at the Battle of Stiklestad. After this Orkney was raided by Norwegians and Danes and Brusi agreed to give the King's third to Thorfinn in return for his seeing to the defence of the islands. This agreement lasted until Brusi's death, some time between 1030 and 1035. After that, Thorfinn was sole ruler of the Orkney earldom as a vassal of the King of Norway and as Earl of Caithness responsible to the King of Scots.

== War with Karl Hundason ==
The Orkneyinga Saga says that a dispute between Thorfinn and Karl Hundason began when the latter became "King of Scots" and claimed Caithness, his forces successfully moving north and basing themselves in Thurso. In the war which followed, Thorfinn defeated Karl in a sea-battle off Deerness at the east end of the Orkney Mainland. Then Karl's nephew Mutatan or Muddan, appointed to rule Caithness for him, was killed in Caithness by Thorkel Fosterer. Finally, a great battle at "Torfness" (probably Tarbat Ness on the south side of the Dornoch Firth) ended with Karl either being killed or forced to flee. Thorfinn, the saga says, then marched south through Scotland as far as Fife, burning and plundering as he passed.

== Joint rule with Rognvald ==
At some point around 1034 Thorfinn is said to have conquered the Hebrides and he is likely to have been a de facto ruler of the Kingdom of the Isles, in whole or in part until his death (although the assumption of Echmarcach mac Ragnaill as "King of Mann" from 1052 to 1061 may have encroached on his territories). (Note: Echmarcach mac Ragnaill may have "ruled Dublin and the Isles intermittently until 1061" although there appears to be no specific evidence of his presence in or around the Scottish islands.)

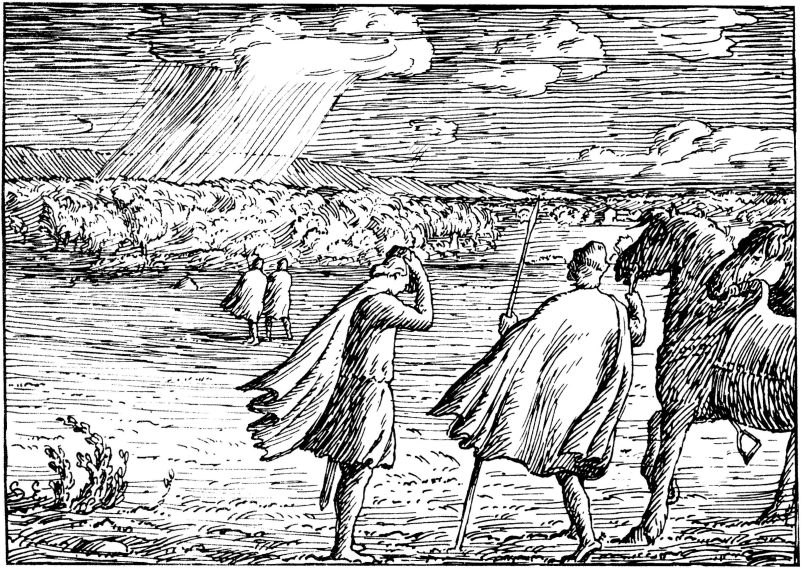
Kalf Arnesson with the young Magnus at the Battle of Stiklestad: 19th century illustration by Halfdan Egedius

Thorfinn ruled alone in Orkney until the return of his nephew Rognvald Brusason in about 1037. Rognvald had received the favour of King Magnus "the Good" Olafsson, who granted him Brusi's share of the islands and the third which Olaf Haraldsson had claimed after Einar's death. Thorfinn agreed to this division, but presented the transfer of the third claimed by the Norwegian king as a gift to Rognvald in return for aid in Thorfinn's wars in the Hebrides and the Irish Sea.

King Sigtrygg Silkbeard had died c. 1036, and the kingship in Dublin had come to Echmarcach mac Ragnaill, who was challenged by Imar mac Arailt and driven out in 1038. This instability in Dublin can only have helped Thorfinn and Rognvald, who raided far and wide and established their rule over various lands around the Irish Sea. They are said to have won a major victory beside Vatzfjorðr, perhaps Loch Vatten on the west coast of Skye, (Note: Crawford (1987) suggests that Vatzfjorðr might refer to Waterford.) and to have raided in England, with mixed success.

In time, Thorfinn and Rognvald fell out. The vivid account of the war between Thorfinn and Rognvald in the Orkneyinga Saga which survives may well be only a part of a much longer saga now lost. Their enmity arose with the arrival of Kalf Arnesson and his followers in Orkney. Kalf was the uncle of Thorfinn's wife Ingibiorg and he had been instrumental in the death of King Olaf. He later left Norway to escape King Magnus Olafsson. Rognvald, with Kalf's brothers, had shared Magnus's exile in Kievan Rus under the protection of Prince Yaroslav the Wise and the saga says that when Kalf and Einar Belly-Shaker came to Ladoga to invite Magnus back to Norway, Rognvald had been on the brink of attacking Kalf until Einar explained the reason for their visit and that Kalf had repented for his part in overthrowing Olaf.

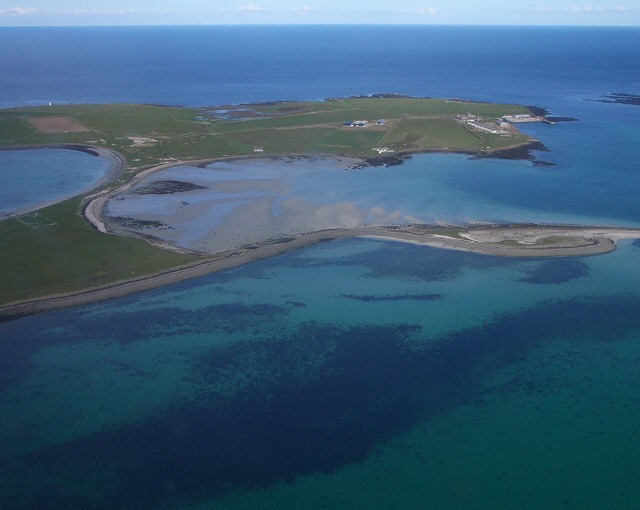
Papa Stronsay, the supposed location of Rognvald Brusason's death at the hands of Thorkel Fosterer

Thorfinn found hosting Kalf and his men a burden, and in time asked Rognvald to return the third of the earldom "which had once belonged to Einar Wry-Mouth". Rognvald refused, saying that it was for King Magnus to settle matters. Thorfinn began raising an army, and Rognvald's islanders were unwilling to fight Thorfinn, so Rognvald sailed to Norway where King Magnus supplied him with ships and men. He returned to the islands, facing Thorfinn and Kalf Arnesson in a sea battle which Arnór the skald commemorated in verse. The battle went Rognvald's way to begin with, but in the end he was defeated and forced again to seek refuge with King Magnus.

King Magnus offered to fit out another expedition for Rognvald, but he decided to take just one ship and a picked crew. He sailed to Shetland in winter and, learning that Thorfinn was staying on a farm on the Orkney Mainland with only a few men, he set out at once to attack him. Rognvald's men surprised Thorfinn, and set the farm ablaze. The saga says that Thorfinn had to break down a wall and escape, carrying his wife in his arms, flying south to Caithness for safety. Rognvald ruled in Kirkwall over the winter, believing Thorfinn dead, but in the spring, while staying on Papa Stronsay, Thorfinn and his men turned the tables, taking Rognvald by surprise, just as he had surprised Thorfinn. Rognvald escaped the house Thorfinn had surrounded, but was tracked down, given away by the barking of his lap dog, and killed by Thorkel Fosterer. (Note: Thomson (2008) writes: "The story of the killing of Rognvald is saga-fiction, and it contains some stock-episodes which are repeated elsewhere in the saga".)

The Orkneyinga Saga offers this assessment of Rognvald: "Everyone agrees that of all the Earls of Orkney he was the most popular and gifted, and his death was mourned by many".

== Pilgrimage ==
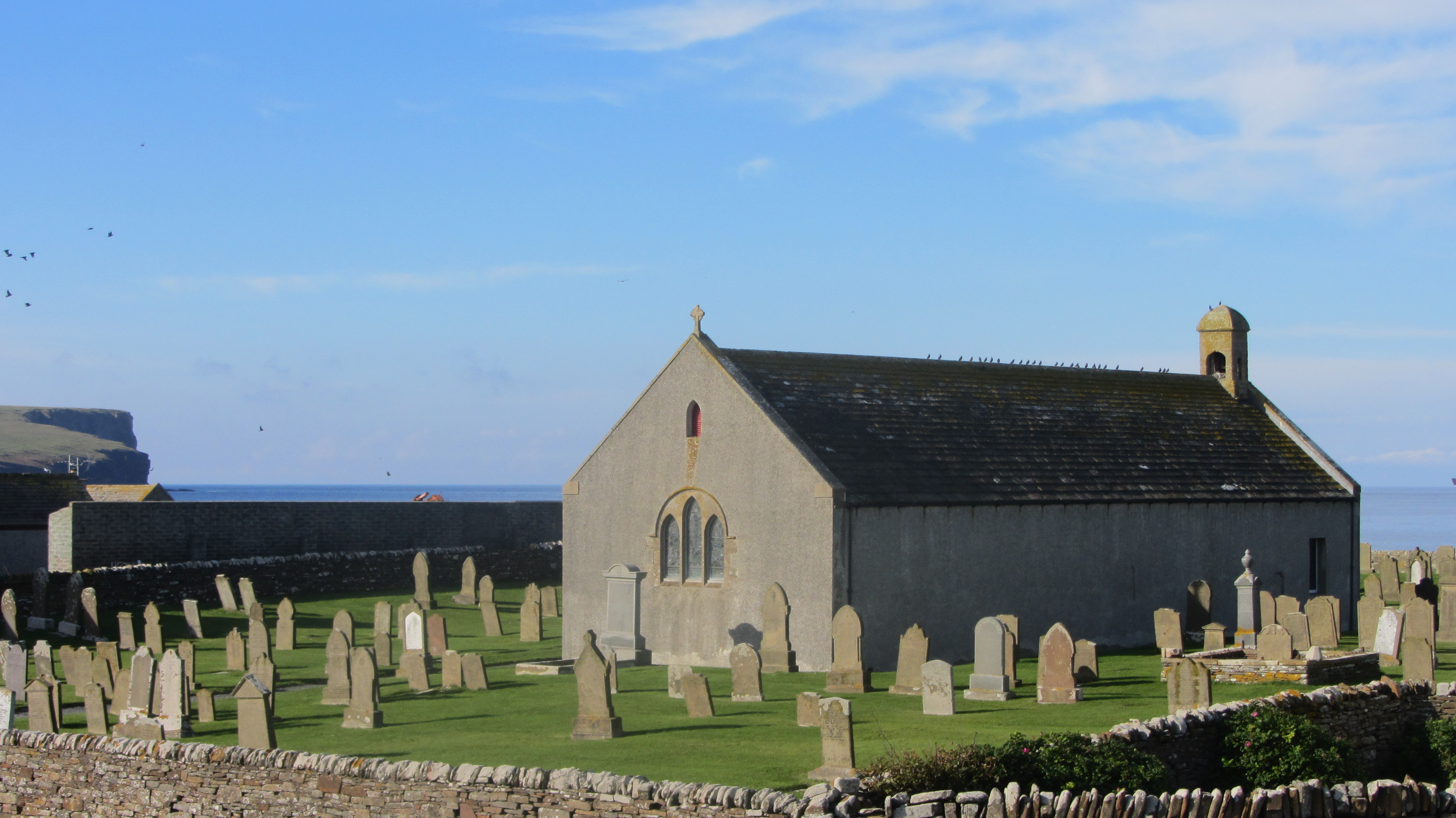
St. Magnus Church, Birsay. The site is a possible location for Thorfinn's "Christ Kirk".

Even with Rognvald dead, Thorfinn was not entirely secure. The saga recounts an attempt to make peace with Magnus Olafsson, who had sworn vengeance for the death of his men in Thorfinn's attack on Rognvald. Magnus was at war with the Danish king Sweyn Estridsson, and died before he could take any action. Magnus's uncle and successor, Harald Hardrada, was more friendly towards Thorfinn, and made peace, accepting Thorfinn's gifts.

Thorfinn had two sons, both by his wife Ingibiorg, and unlike a number of his predecessors he appears to have married only once. Furthermore, unlike his brothers, Thorfinn had been raised as a Christian. Among the signs of the changes in Orkney society was Thorfinn's pilgrimage to Rome, which took place after his meeting with King Harald, probably beginning in 1048. The saga says that he travelled through Saxony, meeting with Emperor Henry III on the journey. It is thought that he also met with Archbishop Adalbert of Hamburg-Bremen. (Note: Crawford suggests that Adam of Bremen's report of a "legate" from Orkney probably refers to Thorfinn himself.)

The Orkneyinga saga suggests that, as a result of Thorfinn's request, the first Bishop of Orkney was appointed at about this time. Named Thorulf, he may have been the same person as "Roolwer", Bishop of the Isles. The original seat of the bishops of Orkney was Thorfinn's new Christchurch at Birsay, (or perhaps the Brough of Birsay), near the Earl's palace where Thorfinn had his residence in his later years.

== Death and legacy ==
The Orkneyinga saga dates Thorfinn's death no more precisely than placing it "towards the end" of Harald Sigurdsson's reign, who died at the battle of Stamford Bridge in 1066. Thorfinn was buried at the Christ Church he himself had built. He is known to history as "Thorfinn the Mighty", and at his height of power, he controlled all of Orkney and Shetland, the Hebrides, Caithness and Sutherland, and his influence extended over much of the north of Scotland. The saga also makes a grander and more unlikely claim – that he controlled a total of seven earldoms in Scotland.

He was followed as earl by his sons Paul and Erlend and his widow Ingibiorg the "Earls' Mother" later married Malcolm Canmore, King of Scots. St Olaf's saga states that following Thorfinn's decease "many of the dominions that the earl had laid under himself were lost".

== Interpretations ==
There is clearly some doubt about the historicity of many of the claims in the Orkneyinga saga. Just as the backdrop to the supposed great expedition to the west undertaken by King Harald Fairhair that led to the founding of the Orkney earldom was the mid-13th century Norwegian contest with the Kings of Scots over the Hebrides we can see parallels with later events that have been included as embellishments to the life of Thorfinn. The saga writer would have had access to Arnór jarlaskáld's Þórfinnsdrápa and whatever oral history was available in the early 13th century. There are also a number of parallels with the life of Harald Maddadsson and Woolf (2007) speculates that aspects of Thorfinn's story may have been included to legitimise the latter's adventures.

=== Descent ===
The saga states that Thorfinn's grandfather was "King Malcolm of Scotland" and it is often assumed that this was Malcolm II. However, both the Irish annals for this period and the Norse sagas have a tendency to refer to a "king of Scots" when discussing a regional chief or mormaer. Woolf (2007) suggests that the reference may then be to Máel Coluim mac Máil Brigti a Pictish Mormaer of Moray or alternatively that, as elsewhere in Icelandic literature, Melkólmr was simply used as a generic name, in this case for Scottish royalty. (Note: The Irish Annals of Tigernach for the year 1029 refer to "Malcolm, king of Scotland, the son of Maelbrigte, son of Ruadri" who died in that year, which is clearly a description of the Mormaer of Moray rather than Malcolm II.)

=== Chronology ===
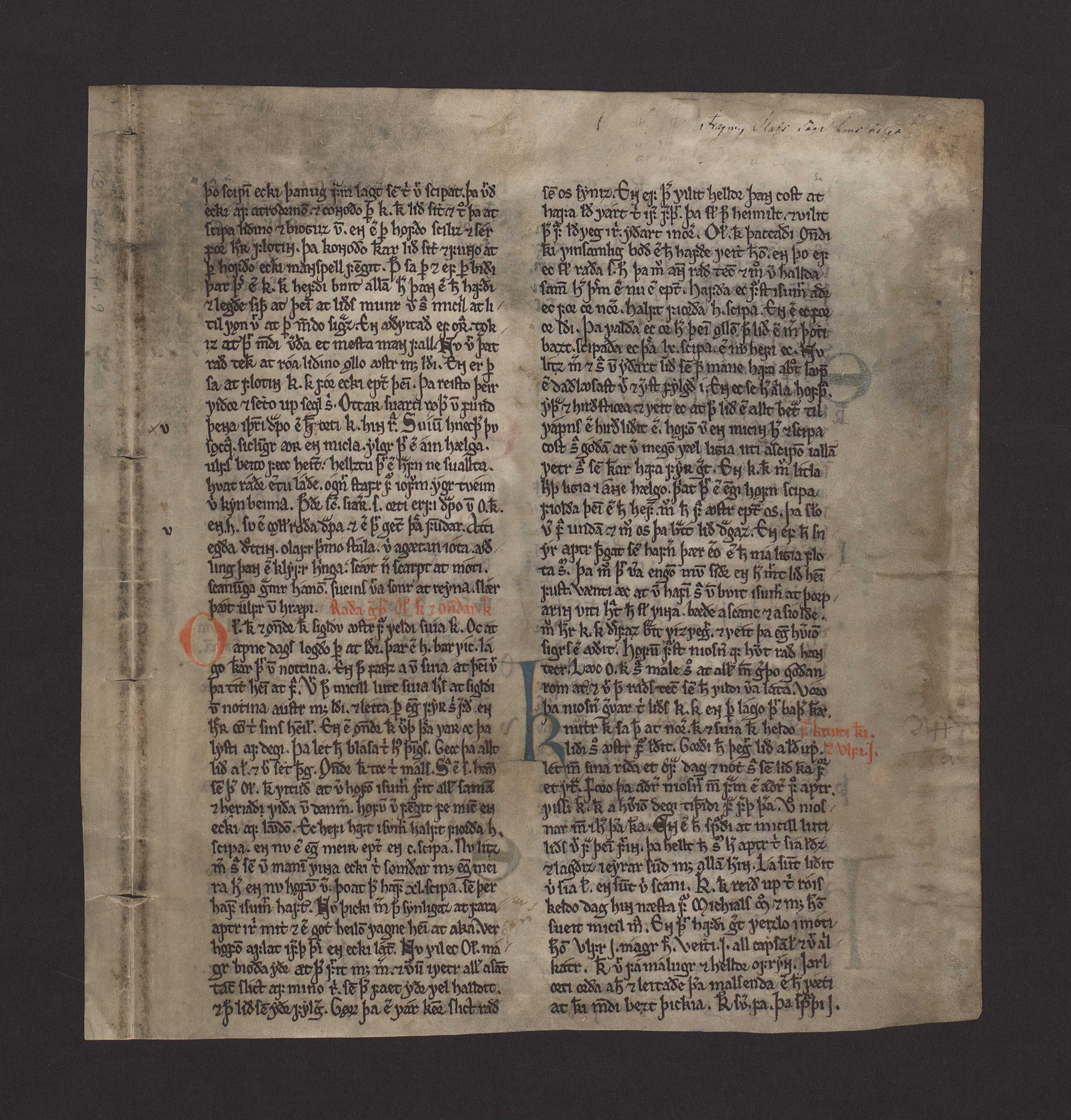
One of two surviving pages of an early version of the Heimskringla known as the "Kringla leaf", which is kept in the National and University Library of Iceland. The text is part of Óláfs saga helga.

The chronology of Thorfinn's life is problematic, the dating of his assumption of the earldom being an example. The Heimskringla states that Thorfinn was 5 years old when his father Sigurd was killed at Clontarf, reliably dated to 1014. "When Thorfinn came of age he asked Earl Einar for a third of the islands" and it is clear from the text of the Orkneyinga saga that Einar, Brusi and Thorfinn were joint earls for a period. Muir (2005) states that Einar died in October 1020 but if Thorfinn was five years old in 1014 this would have made him only eleven by then. A rather earlier birthdate for Thorfinn is thus implied, with a coming of age c. 1016 at about the time of Sumarlidi's death. Similarly, Thorfinn is often stated as dying c. 1064, although Woolf (2007) states that "there is no reason why a date in the late 1050s is not just as credible."

St Olaf's saga states that Thorfinn "took the earldom when he was five winters old, and he ruled for more than sixty winters" although this implies a very late death date of 1074. One version of the Icelandic Annals has his rule lasting 52 years, providing the more commonly quoted year of death as c. 1065.

=== Ingibiorg ===
Related to this are the actions of his widow. Historians offering a later date for Thorfinn's death have proposed that Malcolm Canmore married a postulated daughter of Thorfinn named Ingibiorg rather than his widow. If a date in the 1050s is presumed, then Malcolm could well have married Ingibigiorg as the saga suggests.

Duncan (2002) argued that Malcolm came to marry Thorfinn's widow because he spent some or all of the period of MacBeth's reign in Orkney or Caithness at Thorfinn's court. Thorfinn and Malcolm were both descendants of Malcolm II, daughter's son and daughter's grandson respectively, and both had good reason to be hostile to MacBeth and his Moray kinsmen. Malcolm Canmore became king of Scots c. 1058 and the Orkneyinga Saga records that he and Ingibiorg had a son, Duncan who was later king. There is some circumstantial evidence that Ingibiorg may have backed Malcolm's claim to the kingship which adds further weight to a slightly earlier death date for Thorfinn, although the evidence for her marriage to Malcolm is not entirely convincing.

=== Who was Karl Hundason ===
The identity of Karl Hundason, unknown to Scots and Irish sources, has long been a matter of dispute. His existence rests solely on the Orkneyinga saga, and more particularly on those elements of Þórfinnsdrápa which are preserved within it. (Note: Arnór's poetry is quoted verbatim in the saga, interspersed with various embellishments in the narrative. Arnór was in Orkney at or about the time of this conflict and it is he who describes Thorfinn's foe as "Karl" and "lord of the Scots". It is the saga writer who adds the patronymic "Hundasson".)

Robertson (1862) proposed that Hundason should be identified with Duncan I. Skene (1902) suggested that Karl (or Kali) Hundason should be identified with "Malcolm MacKenneth", a son of Kenneth III. Another candidate is MacBeth whose father may be called "jarl Hundi" in Njál's saga. Woolf (2007) proposes that Hundason, rather that being some hitherto unknown Scots king, was the son of Thorfinn's brother Hundi. However, Thomson (2008) notes that both the Orkneyinga saga and St Olaf's saga suggest Hundi only lived "a short while" and was unlikely to have had a son himself. Anderson (1990) suggested that this is "a fabulous story" and concluded that "[n]o solution to the riddle seems to be justified".

Muir (2005) points out that a literal translation of "Karl Hundisson" is "peasant son-of-a-dog", an insult that would have been obvious to Norse-speakers hearing the saga and that "we can assume this wasn't his real name". The implication is that there is no purpose in seeking phonetic parallels with known Scots personages. Thomson points out that both "Karl" and Hundi" are names used in other contexts without disparaging intentions although the combination is otherwise unknown.

Thomson (2008) notes that the war with Hundasson seem to have taken place between 1029 and 1035 and that the Annals of Ulster record the violent death of Gillacomgain, brother of Máel Coluim mac Máil Brigti and Mormaer of Moray, in 1032. He too is thus a candidate for Thorfinn's Scots foe—and the manner of his death by fire bears comparison with Arnór's poetic description of the aftermath of the battle at Torfness.

Whoever Karl son of Hundi may have been, it appears that the saga is reporting a local conflict with a Scots ruler of Moray or Ross:

[T]he whole narrative is consistent with the idea that the struggle of Thorfinn and Karl is a continuation of that which had been waged since the ninth century by the Orkney earls, notably Sigurd Rognvald's son, Ljot, and Sigurd the Stout, against the princes or mormaers of Moray, Sutherland, Ross, and Argyll, and that, in fine, Malcolm and Karl were mormaers of one of these four provinces. (Note: There were only two Earls of Orkney named Sigurd. Taylor idenitifies Sigurd "the Stout" Hlodvirsson but the earlier Sigurd ("the Mighty") was Rognvald Eysteinsson's brother, not his son.)

It is therefore entirely possible that Thorfinn's campaign was not fought against the Scottish crown as such but that rather the Scots may have been his allies in a struggle they both had against the power of Moray. According to local tradition, a series of stone mounds on a hillside near Kirkhill, west of Inverness, marks the site of a battle between Thorfinn and 'Malcolm'. The location may have been close to the northern boundary of the medieval lordship of Moray at the time.

=== Christianity, morality and power ===
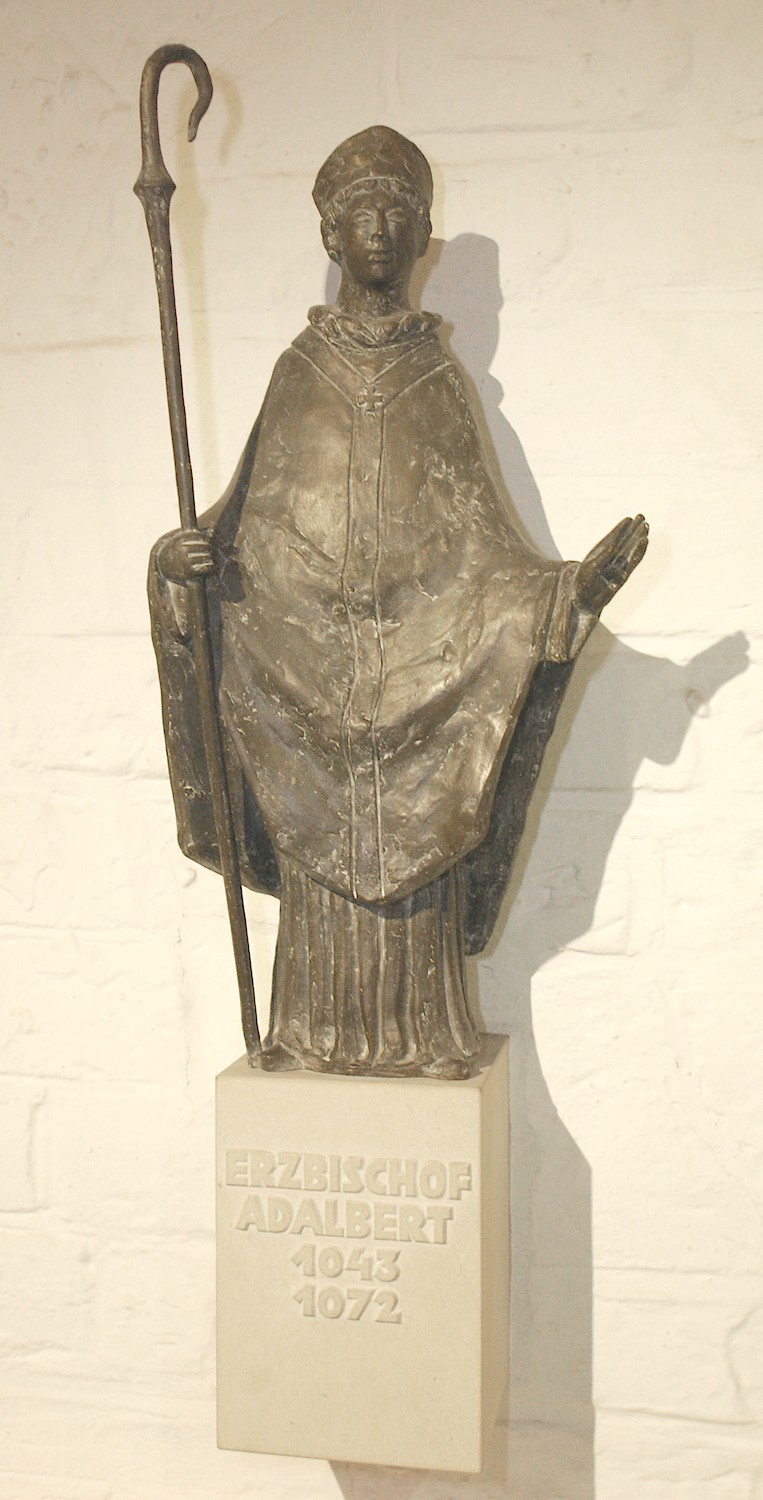
Modern statue in Bremen Cathedral of Archbishop Adalbert of Hamburg, who may have met with Earl Thorfinn and who appointed Bishop Thorulf of Orkney.

The joint rulership of earls was a recurring theme in the period up to 1214 and was "inherently unstable and usually ended in violence". Thomson (2008) identifies these family feuds as being the main theme of the Orkneyinga saga, culminating in the martyrdom of St Magnus c.1115, and that the saga writer regularly emphasises the doom of "kin-slaying". In this case the Sigurdsson brothers do not assassinate one another, but rather Thorkel Fosterer becomes an intermediary, killing both Einar rangmunnr and, at a later date, Rögnvald Brusasson on behalf of Thorfinn.

It is also clear that there is a moral element to the tale, with Brusi cast as the peacemaker who is father to the noble Rögnvald and who stands in contrast to his greedy half-brother. Notwithstanding these roles, Thorfinn's Christianity is emphasised in the saga materials. The Norse in the Northern Isles would have been strongly influenced by the neighbouring Christian countries and it is likely that marriages to individuals from such polities would have required baptism even before his time. Informal pagan practice was likely conducted throughout his earldom, but the weight of archaeological evidence suggests that Christian burial was widespread in Orkney even during the reign of Sigurd Hlodvirsson, Thorfinn's father.

Furthermore, Brusi has a relatively minor role to play compared to Thorfinn "the Mighty", whose conquests included expansion well into north mainland Scotland and whose rule may have marked the zenith of Scandinavian influence in Scotland. As there were only seven traditional Scottish earldoms in total, the sagas claim that he held this many seems to suggest that he was King of Scots. However, this may reflect either a royal pretension of Thorfinn's, or given that his conquests were in the north and west rather than in the lowland heartland of Scotland, that they are references to local chieftainships.

Although the saga suggests that the first Bishop of Orkney was installed towards the end of Thorfinn's time as earl, the first recorded bishop was Henry of Lund (also known as "the Fat") who was appointed sometime prior to 1035. He may have been more of a missionary bishop than a permanent resident in the islands, indeed there is no record of his ever having visited Orkney. The bishopric appears to have been under the authority of the Archbishops of York and of Hamburg-Bremen at different times during this early period. (Note: The two dioceses were fierce rivals for the right to consecrate a Bishop of Orkney. It is presumed Henry of Lund was appointed by York whilst Thorulf was Hamburg-Bremen's man. Adam of Bremen recorded that the former embezzled Cnut and delighted in the "pestiferous practice of drunkenness and gluttony" that led to his death.)

=== Relations with Norway ===
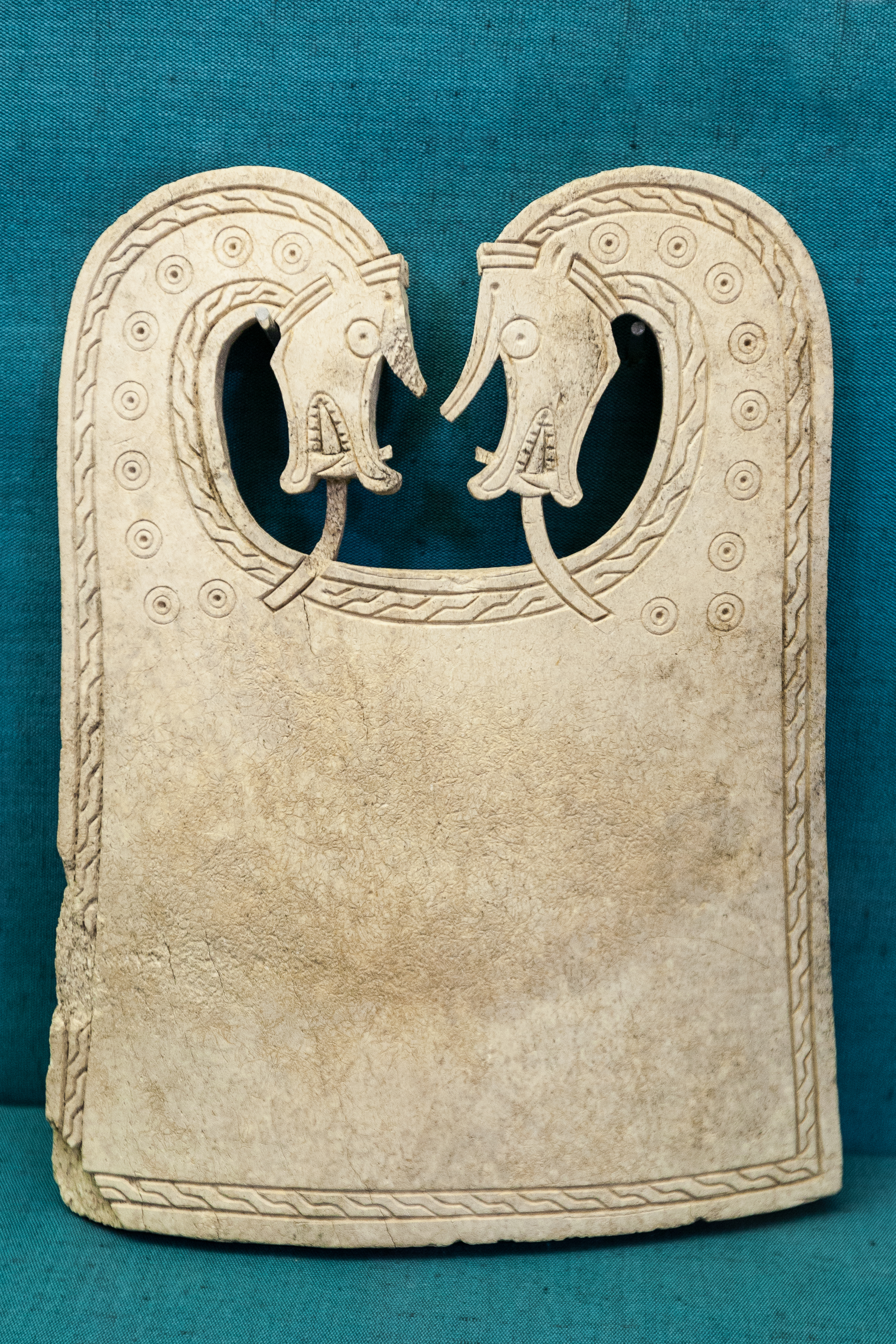
The Scar boat burial whalebone plaque found on the island of Sanday

The role of the Norwegian crown is another recurring aspect of the saga. Crawford (1987) observes several sub-themes: "submission and of overlordship; the problem of dual allegiance and the threat of the earls looking to the kings of Scots as an alternative source of support; the Norwegian kings' use of hostages; and their general aim of attempting to turn the Orkney earls into royal officials bound to them by oaths of homage, and returning tribute to them on a regular basis." King Olaf was a "skilled practitioner" of divide and rule and the competing claims of Brusi and Thorfinn enabled him to take full advantage.

Thorfinn's journey in 1020 is the first occasion on which an earl of Orkney is known to have visited the royal court in Norway. The Icelandic annals have little to say about Orkney but under the year 1021 it is recorded that "Earl Thorfinn and earl Brusi, Sigurd's sons, gave the Orkneys into the power of King Olaf." Although the saga writer paints a vivid and plausible picture of the scene, this "merely tell us that the thirteenth-century saga writer knew his Orkney traditions and the recurring factors which did indeed come to the fore on occasions during the thirteenth century when the kings and earls fought or negotiated from their related positions of strength".

Although Thorfinn is clearly stated to be fighting in and around Fife Thomson (2008) suggests that his presence so far south may have been as an ally of his grandfather rather than at the head of an invading army. He adds that King Cnut was in Scotland c. 1031 receiving the submission of Malcolm II, MacBeth and a third king called "Iehmarc" (Note: It is likely that "Iehmarc" was Echmarcach mac Ragnaill.) and that the location of the meeting is stated as being in Fife in a verse by Sigvatr Þórðarson. Thomson therefore speculates that Thorfinn's visit to Fife may have involved an attempt by Cnut to avoid a threat to his position from Orkney and that this issue was one of the factors involved in the feud between Thorfinn and earl Rögnvald, who supported Cnut's rival Magnus Olafsson. (Note: If this was part of Cnut's intention his fears were justified. His son Svein Knutsson was expelled as king of Norway in 1035 and succeeded by Magnus Olafsson who was aided by Rögnvald Brusason.)

Finally, Thorfinn's death may have created a power vacuum and been a cause of the invasion of the Irish Sea region nominally led by King Harald harðraði's young son Magnus Haraldsson dated to 1058.

=== In fiction etc. ===
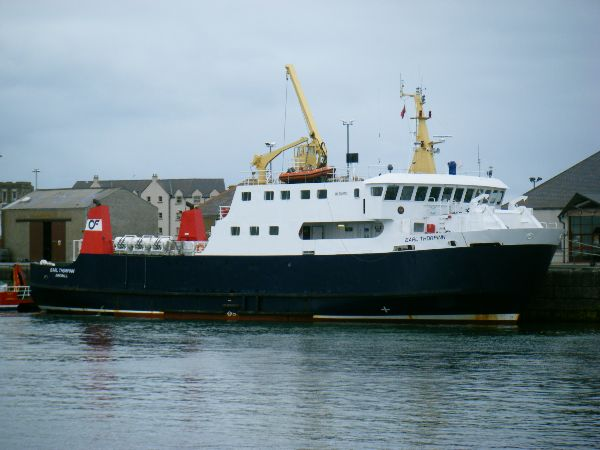
MV Earl Thorfinn in Kirkwall harbour

The basis of Dorothy Dunnett's 1982 novel King Hereafter is a point made by W. F. Skene, who noted that the historical sources which mention Thorfinn do not refer to MacBeth, and vice versa. Pursuing this idea, Dunnett wrote the novel on the premise that MacBeth and Thorfinn were the same person (Thorfinn is his birth name and Macbeth his baptismal name).

In his historical novel MacBeth the King Nigel Tranter portrayed Thorfinn as a half-brother of Macbeth, with a common mother. It also seeks to tie together the pilgrimages made to Rome by both, as one and the same.

The MV Earl Thorfinn is a Ro-Ro vehicle ferry operated by Orkney Ferries on the northern route to Westray, Stronsay and neighbouring isles. It is identical to its sister ship MV Earl Sigurd.

Preceded by Sigurd the Stout?	Mormaer of Caithness; 1014–c. 1064	Succeeded by Madadhan?
Preceded by Einar Sigurdsson; Brusi Sigurdsson; Sumarlidi Sigurdsson	Earl of Orkney; 1020–c. 1064^{with Einar Sigurdsson −1020}^{with Brusi Sigurdsson −c.1030}^{with Rögnvald Brusason 1037 – c.1045}	Succeeded by Paul and Erlend Thorfinnsson
