= Hlodvir Thorfinnsson =

- Jarl of Orkney
- Reign: c. 980–991
- Spouse: Eðnu, Ragnhild Eriksdotter
- Issue: Sigurd the Stout
- Father: Thorfinn Torf-Einarsson
- Mother: Grelod

Hlodvir Thorfinnsson (Old Norse: Hlǫðvir Þorfinnsson; c. 945–988), was a Viking leader who served as Jarl of Orkney, overseeing the Northern Isles from about 980 to 987. He is mentioned in the Orkneyinga saga, as well as in the sagas of Óláfr Tryggvason and St. Olaf. Beyond the saga records of Hlodvir, little verifiable information is known.

Hlodvir was the son of the Jarl Thorfinn Torf-Einarsson and Grelod, and he became jarl after the death of his brother, Ljot, who died from wounds suffered at the Battle of Skitten Mire.

Hlodvir married Eðnu, a descendant of Cerball mac Dúnlainge, king of Osraige, with whom he had, at least two daughters: one who married the Hebridean chieftain Gilli, and another who married Hávarð, steward of Caithness. He was also married to Ragnhild Eriksdotter. His son Sigurd the Stout is either born from Eðnu or Ragnhild.

Hlodvir died from an illness in 988 and was succeeded by his son, Sigurd II "the Stout". Hlodvir was buried in Höfn, Caithness, which is believed to be Huna, Scotland.
