= Einar Sigurdsson =

Norwegian Earl of Orkney

Einar Sigurdsson (died 1020), also called Einarr rangmunnr Sigurðarson or Einar Wry-Mouth, was a son of Sigurd Hlodvirsson. He was jointly Earl of Orkney from 1014. His life is recorded in the Orkneyinga Saga.

When Earl Sigurd was killed at the Battle of Clontarf, he left four sons: Einar, Brusi, Sumarlidi, and Thorfinn. Thorfinn was only a child, whereas his three brothers were grown men, so the Earldom was divided between the three older brothers. Thorfinn, the only child by his fathers union with the daughter of Malcolm II of Scotland, was appointed to be titular ruler of the Mormaerdom of Caithness by his grandfather.

The Orkneyinga Saga describes Einar as ruthless and grasping, a hard and successful fighting man and that he made no compromises and stood no arguments. He was a great bully. Einar raided abroad often, calling on the farmers for levies and taxes. The raids brought little plunder and the frequent absences of the farmers caused shortage and famine in Einar's lands. His brothers Sumarlidi, who died soon after, and Brusi, were of a different character. The saga says that Brusi was "well liked by everyone". Discontent among the farmers led to a certain Thorkel Amundason going to Einar to protest the levies. Einar agreed to Thorkel's request the first year he was asked, but the second year he angrily refused, swearing "that only one of them would see the assembly the next spring." Thorkel, and many other notables, went into exile at Thorfinn's court in Caithness.

When Sumarlidi died, Thorfinn asked for his share of earldom. Brusi was willing to give him it, but Einar told Thorfinn that the lands in Scotland which Thorfinn already had were a fair share and took Sumarlidi's third of the islands for himself. Thorfinn began raising an army in Caithness, and when Einar heard the news, he set off to Scotland with an army. War between the brothers was avoided by Brusi's peacemaking. Einar was made chief earl, and he and Brusi would have two-thirds of the earldom, while Thorfinn, as he had wanted, received the remaining third.

On one of Einar's many raids, this time in Ireland, he suffered a heavy defeat near Larne Lough at the hands of the local Irish king, called Konofogor (OIr Conchobar) by the saga. Konofogor was assisted by a force of Norwegians led by Eyvind Aurochs-Horn, a comrade of King Olaf Haraldsson. Einar blamed Eyvind for his defeat, and as luck would have it Eyvind was forced into Osmundwall by a storm on his voyage back to Norway. Einar heard of this, and led a force to capture Eyvind, who he executed with some of his men. The rest he allowed to return to Norway. King Olaf Haraldsson "felt that he had suffered great loss and that this was done mostly to spite him".

Thorfinn went to Norway to Olaf Haraldsson's court, where he was well received. When he returned, Einar again began collecting an army, and Brusi again made peace between them. They agreed that Thorkel Amundason, now Thorfinn's foster-father, should be reconciled with Einar, and that the two should feast each other. Einar came to Thorkel first, and things went badly. When the time came for them to leave to go to Einar's feast, Thorkel's men reported back that Einar had armed men by the way, apparently waiting to ambush Thorkel. Thorkel turned the tables on Einar, killing him first, and fled to Norway, to King Olaf, who was pleased to learn what he had done.

Einar had no sons and his share of the earldom passed to Brusi.

Preceded by Sigurd Hlodvisson	Earl of Orkney; 1014–1020^{with Brusi Sigurdsson}^{with Sumarlidi Sigurdsson}	Succeeded by^{Thorfinn Sigurdsson}^{Brusi Sigurdsson}
