= Hugh Frazer (artist) =

Irish painter (1793–1880)

- Born: 1793; Dromore, County Down, Ireland
- Died: 22 February 1880 (aged 86–87); Dublin

Hugh Frazer (1793?–22 February 1880) was an Irish landscape and genre painter. He is regarded as Belfast's first notable landscape painter.

== Early life ==
Hugh Frazer was born around 1793 in Dromore, County Down. His parents were Hugh, a solicitor, and Agnes Frazer (née Dickson). Alexander Colville (1699-1777), Agnes' grandfather, was a non-subscribing Presbyterian minister. Other more distant relatives include Charles Dickson, John Martin, and John Mitchel.

Frazer enrolled in the Dublin Society drawing school in 1812, and exhibiting a drawing with the Society of Artists, Dublin in 1813. A poem, published in November 1821 was inscribed to Frazer:

Delightful art! that to our raptured eyes

Nature’s reflected images supplies;

That on the breathing canvas can display

Fair favourite scenes and seasons pass’d away –

That, by the power of blended tints, can bring

Before us all the beauteous tribes of Spring;

To thy surprising efforts, too, we owe

A boon no other science can bestow –

A boon that language, though her skill she strain,

Tries to confer with letter’d pomp, in vain;

The forms of dear, departed friends, now laid

In the dark mansions of oblivion’s shade –

To these new being thou alone canst give,

And bid their figures, looks, and features live.

== Career ==
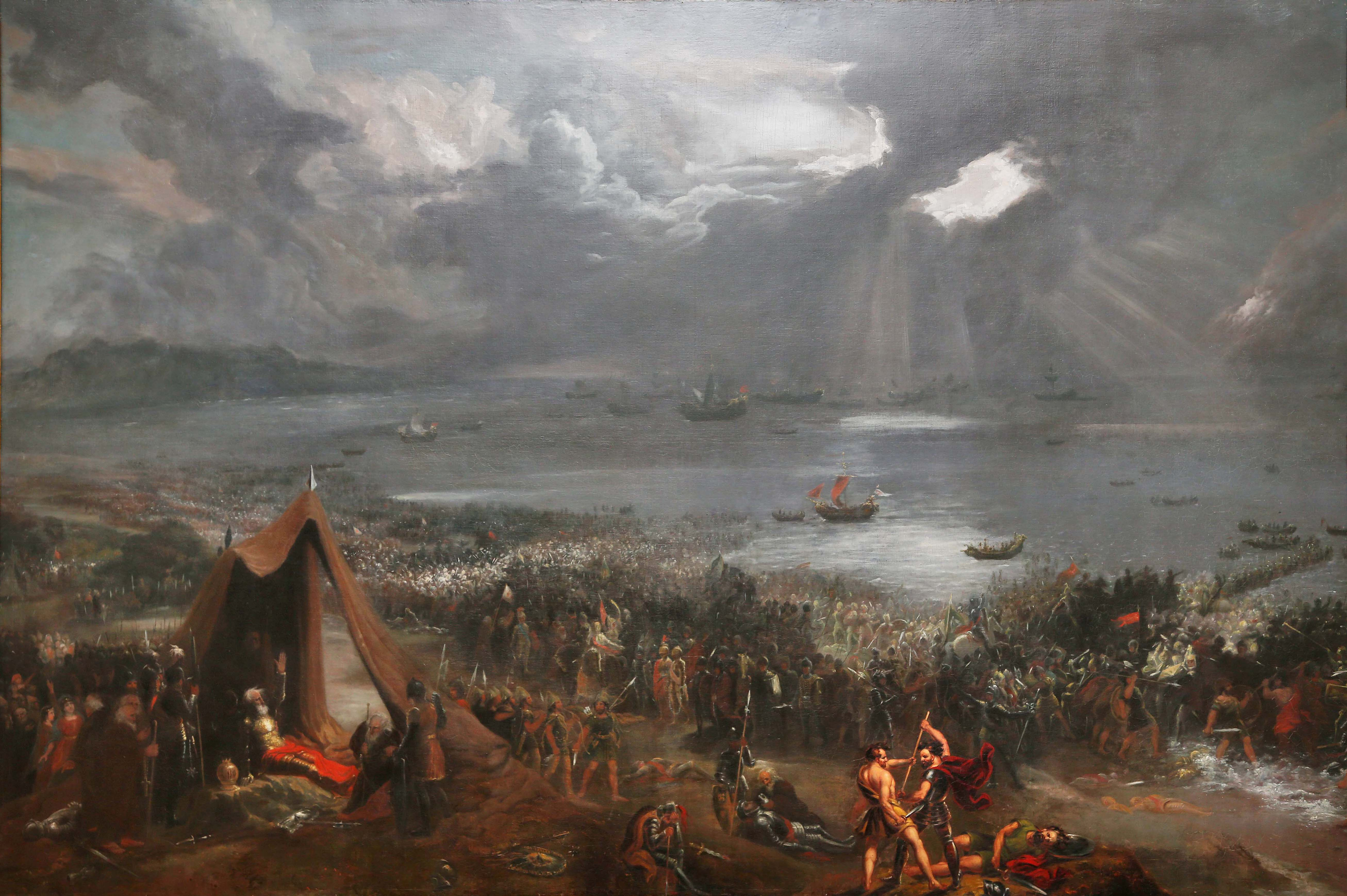
Battle of Clontarf, oil on canvas painting by Hugh Frazer, 1826, Isaacs Art Center

He exhibited at the Royal Hibernian Academy from 1826 through 1864. He was appointed an associate member in 1830, and granted membership at the RHA in 1837, he was a professor of painting there from 1839 to 1853, also acting as the librarian from 1845. Through this work, he knew many of the prominent artists of the day, and it is likely he taught many of them.

In 1825 he published Essay on painting, calling for textile workers to be taught the science of colour and design. In the 1830s he called for the creation of an institute of fine arts in Belfast. Frazer was also President of the Association of Artists, which was founded in Belfast in 1836 (190 years ago), using his inaugural address to call on others to support local art and art education. Other prominent members included Andrew Nicholl.

The Dictionary of Irish Biography, his work as "uneven; sometimes competent, but more often rather weak" though "regarded as the earliest important landscape artist from Ulster". His paintings form a record of locations in the Lagan Valley and Belfast in the late 1800s. As well as landscapes, he painted some genre paintings and portraits.

Throughout his life, Frazer moved between Dublin, Belfast and Dromore. Amongst the Dublin addresses were 28 Philipsburgh Avenue, Fairview, 39 Summer Street, and 2 Bachelor's Walk. He was frequently in financial difficulty, and at times would offer to raffle his work. He resigned from the RHA in 1861 "owing to future absence from Dublin and perhaps from Ireland."

No details are known of his marriage or life after 1861. He died on 22 February 1880 aged 87 at his sister's home, 48 Charleville Avenue, North Strand.

== Selected works ==
- The faction fight (1838)
- Descent from the Cross (1839), altarpiece in the Catholic chapel, Dromore
- Launch of the Aurora (1839)
