= Sumarlidi Sigurdsson =

Sumarlidi Sigurdsson (died between 1014 and 1018) was jointly Earl of Orkney with his brothers Brusi and Einar Wry-Mouth following the death of their father, Sigurd Hlodvisson, at the battle of Clontarf. Their half-brother, Thorfinn, was very young at that time, perhaps only five years old, and he was sent to be fostered by his grandfather, King Malcolm II.

The sagas depict Sumarlidi as a wise, quiet and peaceful man. Little more is told about him, other than that he died of illness in his bed only shortly after he became earl. After he was gone, there was a quarrel between Einarr and Thorfinn about who would inherit his part of the earldom.
