= Thorkel Amundason =

Foster father of Thorfinn the Mighty

- Known for: Killing Einar Sigurdsson
- Title: The Fosterer
- Children: Thorfinn the Mighty
- Father: Amunde

Thorkel Amundason, also known as Thorkel Fóstri (Thorkel the Fosterer), was an Orcadian man, foster father of Thorfinn the Mighty, and killer of Earl Einar Sigurdsson.

== Early life ==
Thorkel was born to one of the most rich and powerful men on Orkney, Amunde. Amunde was respected amongst many on the islands. Thorkel gained prominence by attempting to intervene with Earl Einar Sigurdsson on behalf of farmers, risking his life. He risked it again when he collected tribute from the Orcadians on behalf of Thorfinn Sigurdsson.

== Under Einar ==
One spring, Earl Einar proclaimed a levy for an expedition. Orcadian landowners, who were unhappy with this, asked Amunde to intercede with the Earl for him. Amunde replied, saying that the earl was stubborn and not one to be entreatied by others.

As things now stand, there is a good understanding between me and the earl; but, in my opinion, there would be much danger of our quarrelling, on account of our different dispositions and views on both sides; therefore I will have nothing to do with it.

The people then turned to Thorkel, who was at first reluctant. However, he agreed to do it, a decision criticized by Amunde for being too hasty. When the Earl held a Thing, Thorkel spoke to him, suggesting that he should lighten the levy because of the heavy burden it put on the landowners. The earl responded favorably to Thorkel's request, decreasing the number of ships required for the expedition from six to three.

I had intended to go out from the country with six ships, but now I will only take three with me; but thou must not come again, Thorkel, with any such request.

Thorkel was thanked, and the Earl set off on his expedition, coming back in Autumn. Next spring, he held another Thing and proclaimed the same levy, to which Thorkel made the same request to lighten the burden on the landowners. The Earl was enraged, closing the Thing. Amunde, hearing about the news, instructed Thorkel to leave the country. Thorkel went to Caithness, where he then worked for Earl Thorfinn, then a child.

== Under Thorfinn ==
Thorkel remained with Thorfinn, becoming his foster father and gaining the title of "Thorkel Fostri", Thorkel the Fosterer. When Thorfinn came of age, he asked Einar for a share in his earldom, which Einar declined. Einar and Thorfinn mobilized their armies and went to war. However, Brusi intervened, preventing a battle, and offered Thorfinn his part of the earldom, to which he agreed. Brusi agreed to share two-thirds of the earldom with Einar.

After the agreement, Thorkel was regularly dispatched to Orkney to gather taxes. Einar was infuriated, as he blamed Thorkel for Thorfinn's uprising. Einar formulated a plan to assassinate Thorkel, which he learned of on one of his tithe-gathering trips to Orkney. Thorkel escaped back to Caithness. Thorfinn convinced Thorkel on his return to go to the court of King Olaf II of Norway instead of confronting Einar. Olaf liked Thorkel, and enjoyed conversing with him. He thought Thorkel was educated and good-natured. When he asked about the Earls, he discovered that Thorkel did not like Einar, but did like Thorfinn. Olaf sent an invitation to Thorfinn to come to Norway, but Thorfinn declined, instead assuring friendship.

After spending a winter at the Norwegian court in 1020, Thorkel returned with Thorfinn to Orkney on a longship given to them by King Olaf. When Einar learned of Thorkel's return, he prepared an attack. Brusi once again intervened and resolved the situation peacefully. Einar promised to forget his enmity to Thorkel, and both men had to throw feasts for each other.

Thorkel had his feast for Einar first in his hall at Deerness. On the day Einar was to leave, Thorkel sent men ahead of him to scout the road. They came back and reported that three ambushes awaited. Thorkel gathered his men and returned to the main hall, announcing that he was not ready. He went up to Einar, closed the door, and sat down beside him. Einar asked "Are you ready?" to which Thorkel replied "I am ready." Thorkel struck Einar in the head and killed him.

After Einar's death, Brusi became responsible for his lands. Thorfinn, who disagreed, set his sights on conquest. Brusi decided to ask for help from Norway. King Olaf made Brusi his steward. Thorfinn arrived in Norway to ask for assistance against Brusi, to which Olaf presented him with the same choice he presented Brusi - Hand over the earldom and declare himself "the King's man". Thorfinn refused, saying he owed allegiance to Scotland because of his family ties, but upon consultation with Thorkel, he accepted.
