= Murkle =

Coordinates: 58.59429°N 3.44353°W

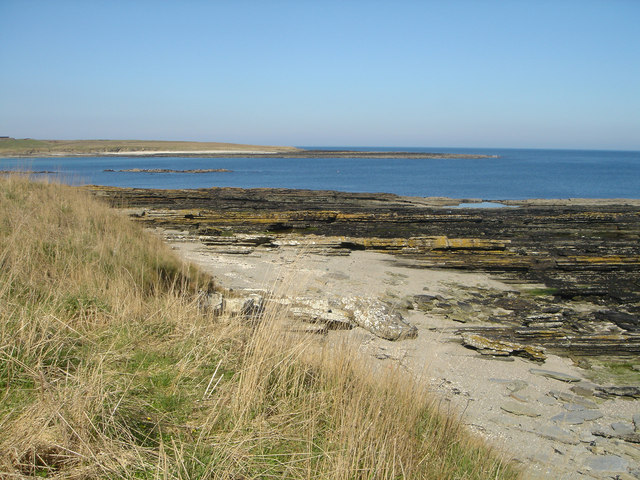
- Murkle Bay Looking across Murkle Bay to the headland known as the Spur of Murkle. Viewed from the shore at East Murkle where the flagstone beds are fringed by a narrow beach of shell sand.

- Location within the Caithness area
- OS grid reference: ND161682
- Council area: Highland
- Country: Scotland
- Sovereign state: United Kingdom
- Postcode district: KW14 8
- Police: Scotland
- Fire: Scottish
- Ambulance: Scottish

Murkle (Murchill) is a small scattered hamlet, made up of East Murkle and West Murkle located one mile (1.6 km) east of Thurso, in Caithness, Scottish Highlands and is in the Scottish council area of Highland.

== Name ==
The name Murkle derives from the name Morthill, meaning Field of Death, so called because it was the site of a battle with the Danes in the early medieval period.

== Sinclairs of Murkle ==
Members of Clan Sinclair associated with Murkle are as follows:

- James Sinclair (1567–1642), 1st of Murkle, who was the second son of John, Master of Caithness, and grandson of George, 4th Earl of Caithness. He married Elizabeth Stewart, daughter of Robert Stewart (b. 1533), Earl of Strathearn and Orkney, a natural son of King James V. He was followed by his son:
- Sir James Sinclair (d. 1662), 2nd of Murkle. He was followed by his son:
- John Sinclair (d. 1705), 3rd of Murkle, who succeeded as 8th Earl of Caithness in 1698. He was followed by his son:
- Alexander Sinclair (d. 1765), 9th Earl of Caithness, upon whose death the earldom of Caithness became a matter of controversy and passed from the Sinclairs of Murkle.

The original estate of Murkle, as possessed by James Sinclair, his wife Elizabeth Stewart, and their son, Sir James, was acquired at various times between 1586 and 1637, from four main sources: George, fifth Earl of Caithness; his son William, Lord Berriedale; the Bishops of Orkney and Caithness; and the Earls of Sutherland. The estate held by Sir James Sinclair consisted of Murkle (East and West) and Clairdon; one half of Ormlie, Thurdistoft, Acharascal, and Carnabiud, Lybster, and Borrowstone, all held of the Earl of Caithness; one half of Ormlie, held of the Bishop of Caithness; Pownreay, held of the Bishop of Orkney; and Broynach, held of the Earl of Sutherland. In the eighteenth century, the family also acquired Isauld (1723) and Brubster and Brims (1726–27).

== Legends ==
It is said that a mermaid once fell in love with a local fisherman, who to this day holds him captive in a nearby loch.

It is also said in the 9th chapter of the Orkneyinga saga that "Ragnhilda, king Eric's daughter" had a husband called Arnfinn, the fifth son of Thorfinn the Earl. Arnfinn died at Murkle in Caithness leaving Ragnhilda a widow.
