= Fitzmaurice =

FitzMaurice

Origin
- Meaning: "Son of Maurice"
- Region of origin: Ireland

Other names
- Variant forms: FitzMaurice; Fitz-Maurice; Fitzmorris

Fitzmaurice is a Hiberno-Norman, Cambro-Norman, Anglo-Norman surname. It is patronymic as the prefix Fitz- derives from the Latin filius, meaning "son of".

According to Irish genealogist Edward MacLysaght:

The first Fitzmaurice family known in Ireland were the sons and daughter of Maurice FitzGerald, Lord of Lanstephan and they were the progenitors of the famous Geraldines through Thomas FitzMaurice, eldest son, known as Lord OConnello, 1st Baron of Kerry, progenitor of the Earls of Desmond and through Gerald FitzMaurice, 2nd eldest son, 1st Lord of Offaly, progenitor of the Earls of Kildare and Earls of Leinster. They were known as lords of Lixnaw in Kerry notable for their resistance to the English in the sixteenth century. They were the grandsons and grand daughter of Gerald FitzWalther, Gerald de Windsor. The name Fitzmaurice is also connected with County Mayo because some Connacht Prendergasts adopted it.

Fitzmaurice is uncommon as a given name.

== Surname ==
Notable people with the surname Fitzmaurice include:

- The family of the Earls of Kildare | Earls of Kerry | Earls of Leinster | Earls of Desmond. Progenitors of the famous Irish family The Geraldines
- Caroline Fitzmaurice, née Fitzgerald (1865–1911), poet, wife of Edmond Fitzmaurice, 1st Baron Fitzmaurice
- Catherine Fitzmaurice, actress and voice specialist, taught at the Juilliard's Drama Division, Yale and Harvard
- Deanne Fitzmaurice, Pulitzer Prize winning American photographer
- Éamonn Fitzmaurice (born 1977), Gaelic footballer with Kerry GAA
- Edmond Fitzmaurice, 1st Baron Fitzmaurice (1846–1935), British Liberal politician, managed estate of the royal family
- Edmond John Fitzmaurice (1881–1962), Catholic bishop of Wilmington, Chancellor of Philadelphia
- George Fitzmaurice (1885–1940), American film director
- George Fitzmaurice (writer) (1877–1963), Irish dramatist and writer for The Dublin Magazine
- Gerald FitzMaurice, 1st Lord of Offaly, (died c. 1221) progenitor of Earls of Kildare and Leinster
- Gerald Fitzmaurice (1901–1982), English barrister and judge, on International Court of Justice and European Court of Human Rights
- James Fitzmaurice (1898–1965), Irish aviation pioneer
- James FitzMaurice FitzGerald (died 1579), leader of the Desmond Rebellions
- John Edmund Fitzmaurice (1839 – 1920), American Catholic bishop of the Erie in Pennsylvania
- John Fitzmaurice (writer) (1947–2003), English author, secretary of the Brussels Labour Party
- John Petty, 1st Earl of Shelburne a.k.a. John FitzMaurice (1706–1761), Anglo-Irish and politician.
- Leo Fitzmaurice (born 1963), British artist
- Lewis Roper Fitzmaurice (1816–1893), surveyor on HMS Beagle; Fitzmaurice River named for him
- Martin Fitzmaurice (1940–2016), English darts personality
- Maurice Fitzmaurice (1861–1924), Irish civil engineer on London County Council
- Maurice Swynfen Fitzmaurice (1870–1927), Royal Navy officer whose ship was sunk by a submarine
- Michael Fitzmaurice (actor) (1908–1967), American radio actor, played "Superman"
- Michael John Fitzmaurice (born 1950), US Army soldier in Vietnam
- Neil Fitzmaurice (born 1969), British writer and actor
- Susan Fitzmaurice (born 1959), British linguist at University of Sheffield
- Thomas FitzMaurice FitzGerald (died c. 1209) progenitor of Earls of Desmond
- Thomas Fitzmaurice, 16th Baron Kerry (1502–1590), Irish baron
- Thomas Fitzmaurice, 18th Baron Kerry (1574–1630), his grandson, Irish military leader in the Nine Years' War
- Thomas FitzMaurice, 1st Earl of Kerry (1668–1741), his great-grandson, Irish peer and politician
- William Petty, 2nd Earl of Shelburne, born William Fitzmaurice (1737–1805), British Prime Minister
- Tom Fitzmaurice (1898–1977), Australian rules footballer with Geelong
- Earls of Orkney from 1791 to 1998:
  - Mary FitzMaurice, 4th Countess of Orkney (1755–1831), daughter of Murrough O'Brien, 1st Marquess of Thomond
  - Thomas FitzMaurice, 5th Earl of Orkney (1803–1877), grandnephew of William Petty Fitzmaurice
  - George FitzMaurice, 6th Earl of Orkney (1827–1889), with 71st Highlanders and 92nd Regiment
  - Edmond FitzMaurice, 7th Earl of Orkney (1867–1951)
  - Cecil FitzMaurice, 8th Earl of Orkney (1919–1998), with Royal Army Service Corps in WWII and Korea

== See also ==
- Petty-Fitzmaurice, disambiguation page
- Fitzmaurice, Saskatchewan, a community in Canada
- Fitzmorris
