= Gilbert, Earl of Orkney =

Gilbert, son of Magnus (1210 – 1256) was jarl of Orkney (which, at the time, included Caithness and Sutherland). Although this was a Norwegian title, some writers use the Scottish term earl, as when the land became Scottish, in the 15th century, the position was replaced by an earl.

Son of Jarl Magnus II, he succeeded his father in 1239. He was in turn father of Magnus III, who succeeded him, and Matilda (or Maud), who married Malise II, Earl of Strathearn, and was the great-grandmother of Malise V, Earl of Strathearn, who later also inherited the jarldom.

Preceded by Magnus II	Earl of Orkney; 1239–1256	Succeeded by Magnus III
