= Scottish–Norwegian War =

1262-66 territorial conflict between the kingdoms of Norway and Scotland

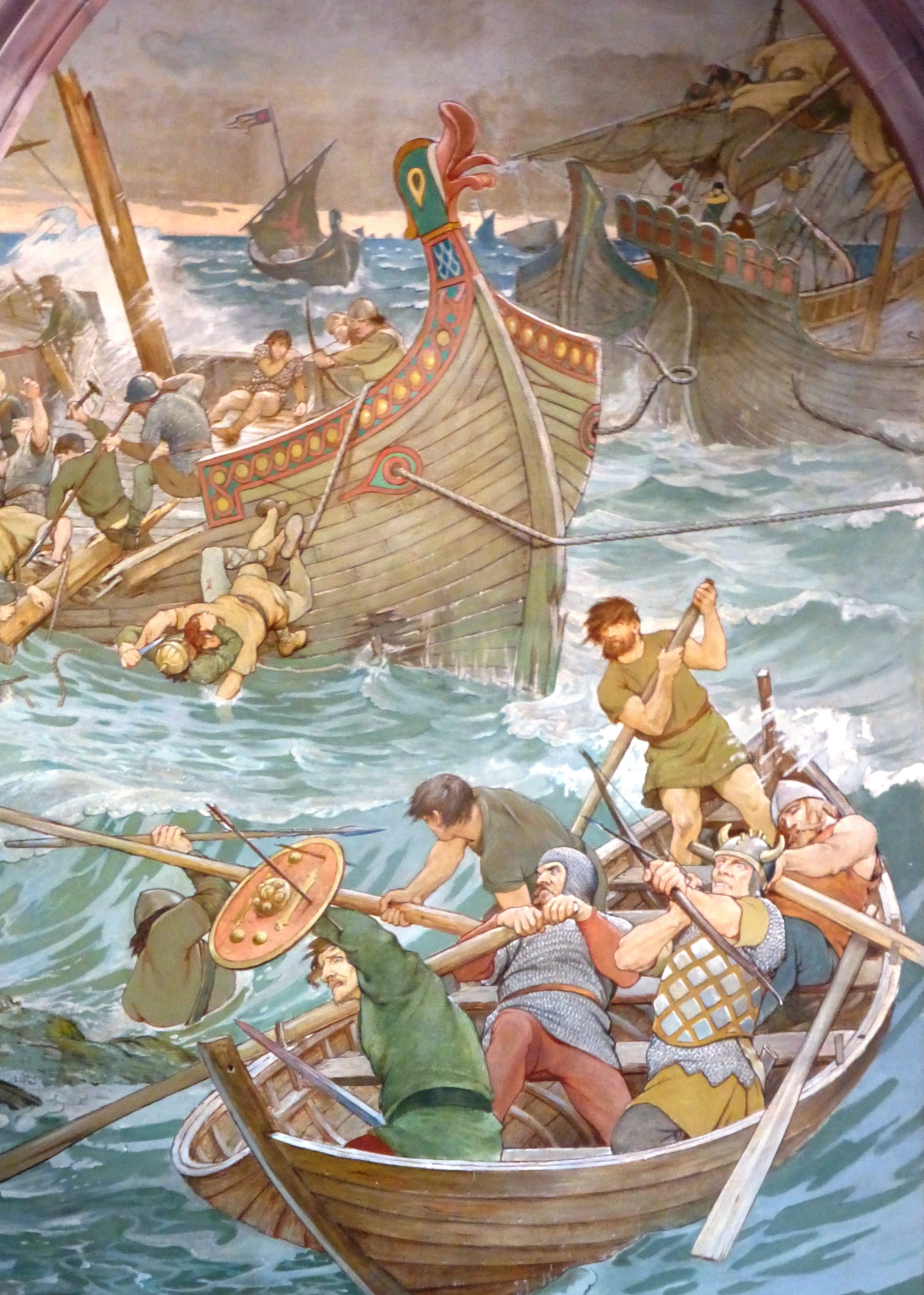
- Detail from William Hole's painting The Battle of Largs
Date	1262–1266
Location	Mostly Scotland, possibly the Hebrides and Orkney as well
Result	Treaty of Perth
Territorial changes	Scotland confirms Norwegian sovereignty over Shetland and Orkney. Scotland purchases the Hebrides and the Isle of Man from Norway for 4,000 Marks.

Belligerents
(Kingdom of Norway (872–1397)) Kingdom of Norway: Kingdom of the Isles; Earldom of Orkney	Kingdom of Scotland

Commanders and leaders
Haakon IV of Norway #: Magnus Olafsson; Magnus III of Orkney; Ogmund Crouchdance	Alexander III of Scotland: Alexander Stewart, 4th High Steward of Scotland; Patrick III, Earl of Dunbar

Strength
c. 12,000 light infantry, around 120 leidang ships	c. 5,000 heavy infantry and 800 heavy cavalry
- [1]: Magnus III of Orkney did not participate in the war; he remained nominal head of the forces who participated in the war from the Earldom of Orkney. [2]: Haakon IV of Norway died during the war, according to some historians, even though he resided in Orkney, the war was still ongoing.

The Scottish–Norwegian War lasted from 1262 to 1266. The conflict arose because of disagreement over the ownership of the Hebrides. The war consisted of mainly skirmishes and feuds between the kings, and the only major battle was the indecisive Battle of Largs.

== Background ==
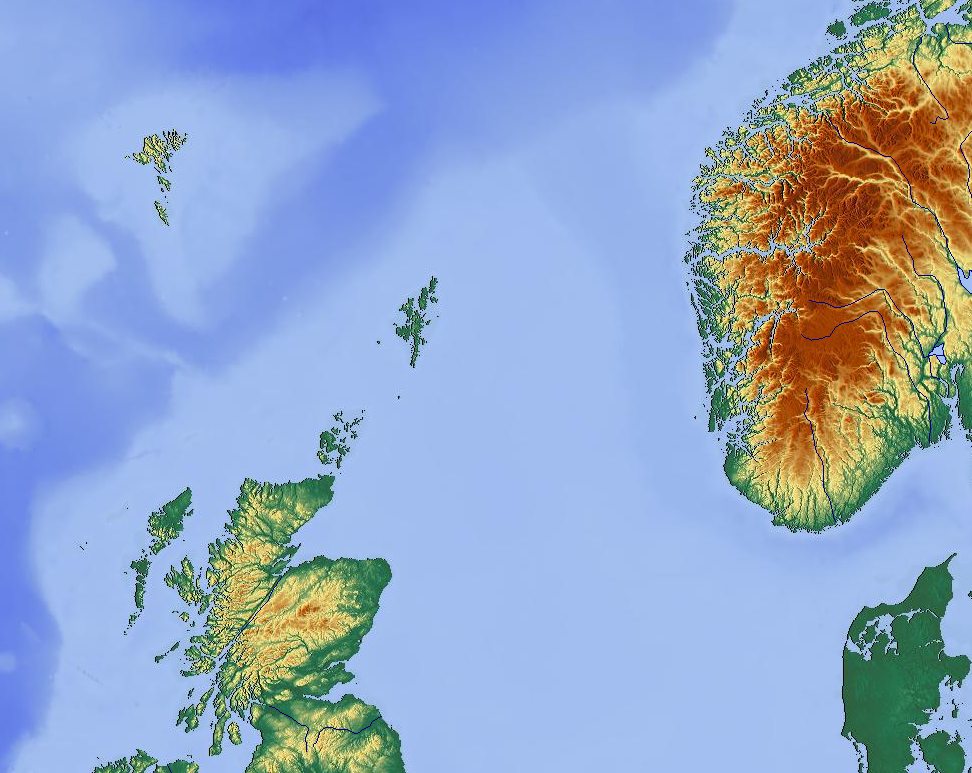
Map of North Sea showing relative location of Scotland and Norway, in relation to Shetland, Orkney and Hebrides islands

Both the Hebrides and the Isle of Man had come under Norwegian influence dating to the reign of King Harald Fairhair of Norway. Norwegian control had been formalised in 1098, when Edgar, King of Scotland signed the islands over to King Magnus III of Norway, setting the boundary between Scots and Norwegian claims in the west. The Scottish acceptance came after the Norwegian king had imposed more direct royal control over the Hebrides as well as Orkney and the Isle of Man in a swift campaign earlier the same year, directed against the local Norse-Gaelic leaders of the various islands. In Norwegian terms, the islands were the Suðreyjar, meaning Southern Isles.

The Norwegian suzerainty over the Hebrides had been contested since the 1240s, when the Scottish king, Alexander II, began asking King Haakon IV of Norway if he could purchase the islands from him. For almost a decade these attempts were unsuccessful, and the negotiations ceased for thirteen years after Alexander II died. When his son, Alexander III, came to power in 1262 by obtaining majority support among the clansmen, he sent Haakon a final request saying that if Haakon did not sell them the islands they would take them by force.

== War (1262–1263) ==
Haakon responded to this request by gathering a fleet of over 120 leidang warships and setting out in July 1263 to defend the Isles. Haakon stopped at the Isle of Arran where negotiations were started. Knowing Haakon had to win a decisive victory before the winter, Alexander III stalled during the negotiations until the autumn storms. In October 1263, several of Haakon's ships became stranded at Largs in stormy weather. A rescue party was sent ashore to help salvage the ships, where the Scottish forces launched a surprise attack, and a minor skirmish followed which ended indecisively. The following morning, Haakon's forces sailed back to Orkney for the winter, where he died in December. Haakon's successor, King Magnus the Lawmender, had problems at home and lacked the funding to launch a new expedition.

== Resolution ==
Although the war was not really decided while Haakon was king, he was a major player in the events leading up to the conflict. Alexander III captured the Hebrides in 1264, and then made another formal claim to the islands which were bought from Norway for 4,000 marks, and 100 every year after under the terms of Treaty of Perth, by which the Scots at the same time recognised Norwegian rule over Shetland and Orkney.

== See also ==
- History of the Outer Hebrides
- Lord of the Isles
- Scandinavian Scotland

== Other sources ==
- Armit, Ian (2006) Scotland's Hidden History (Stroud. Tempus) ISBN 0-7524-3764-X
- Barrett, James H. "The Norse in Scotland" in Brink, Stefan (ed) (2008) The Viking World (Abingdon. Routledge) ISBN 0-415-33315-6
- Crawford, Barbara E. (1987) Scandinavian Scotland (Leicester University Press) ISBN 978-0718511975
- Graham-Campbell, James and Batey, Colleen E. (1998) Vikings in Scotland: An Archaeological Survey (Edinburgh University Press) ISBN 978-0-7486-0641-2
- Haswell-Smith, Hamish (2004) The Scottish Islands (Edinburgh: Canongate) ISBN 978-1-84195-454-7.
- McDonald, R. Andrew (1998) The Kingdom of the Isles: Scotland's Western Seaboard, 1100–c1336 (Tuckwell Press, Ltd. ) ISBN 978-1898410850
- Murray, W. H. (1973) The Islands of Western Scotland (London. Eyre Methuen) ISBN 0-413-30380-2
- Simpson, Grant. G. (ed) (1990) Scotland and Scandinavia 800-1800 (John Donald) ISBN 978-0859762205
- Woolf, Alex (ed.) (2009) Scandinavian Scotland – Twenty Years After (St Andrews. St Andrews University Press) ISBN 978-0-9512573-7-1
