= Magnus IV =

Magnus IV may refer to:

- Magnus IV of Norway (ca. 1115–1139)
- Magnus IV of Orkney (ruled 1273–1284)
- Magnus IV of Sweden (1316–1374)
