= Jón Magnússon, Earl of Orkney =

Jón Magnússon was Earl of Orkney in 1284–c. 1312.

== Life ==
Jón Magnússon was the son of Magnus III of Orkney, and succeeded his brother to the Earldom of Orkney and Earldom of Caithness in 1284. He was a signatory of the Treaty of Birgham/Salisbury in 1290, in which Margaret, Maid of Norway, was betrothed to Edward of Carnarfon. On 5 August 1296 he swore fealty to Edward I of England at Murkle, in Caithness.
