= Magnus III =

Magnus III may refer to:

- Magnus Barefoot, also referred to as Magnus III of Norway (1073–1103)
- Magnus Ladulås, also referred to as Magnus III of Sweden (1240–1290)
- Magnus III of Orkney (1256–1273)
- Magnus III of Mecklenburg-Schwerin (1509–1550)
