= Constance FitzMaurice, Countess of Orkney =

British child artist's model, actress, dancer and singer

Connie Gilchrist
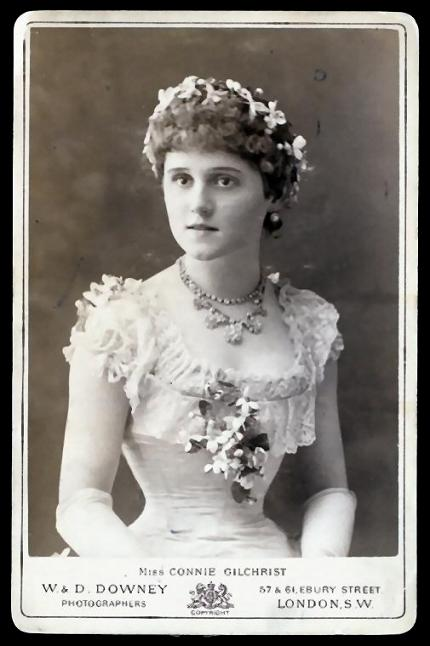
- Born: Constance MacDonald Gilchrist; 23 January 1865; Agar Town, London, England
- Died: 9 May 1946 (aged 81); Tythe House, Stewkley, England
- Occupations: Child Actor, Dancer, and Artist's Model
- Spouse: Edmond Walter FitzMaurice, 7th Earl of Orkney (1892–1946)
- Children: Lady Mary Gosling

Constance FitzMaurice, Countess of Orkney (23 January 1865 – 9 May 1946), also known as Connie Gilchrist, was a British child artist's model, actress, dancer and singer who, at a very early age, attracted the attention of the painters Frederic Leighton, Frank Holl, William Powell Frith and James McNeill Whistler, the writer and photographer Lewis Carroll and aristocrats, Lord Lonsdale and the Duke of Beaufort. She became a popular attraction on stage at the age of 12 in a skipping rope dance routine at London's Gaiety Theatre, where she was then engaged in Victorian burlesque and vaudeville throughout her formative years. Gilchrist, who became known as the "original Gaiety Girl", had abandoned the stage by the time of her marriage in 1892 to Edmond Walter FitzMaurice, 7th Earl of Orkney.

== Early life ==
Constance MacDonald Gilchrist was born in Agar Town, London, the daughter of David and Matilda Maria (née Potter) Gilchrist. Her father worked as an engineer and either her mother or, more likely, her elder sister Matilda Elizabeth was probably the model who posed for Whistler's etching, Tillie: A Model.

As an artist's model Gilchrist first sat for Frederic Leighton at about age six. She was the Arab girl in his painting Little Fatima, all five little girls in Daphnephoria, the child in Study: At a Reading Desk and the student in The Music Lesson. She posed for a series of works that Frank Holl based on W. S. Gilbert's Little Mim, and was the child depicted in his painting The Deserter. Whistler captured Gilchrist's jumping rope routine in his etching, Harmony in Yellow and Gold: The Gold Girl, and posed her for The Blue Girl, while other members of the Royal Academy of Arts, London, such as William Powell Frith, often placed her in their works. Lewis Carroll photographed her at age twelve and a year later wrote in his diary: "she is losing her beauty and can't act – but she did the old skipping-rope dance superbly."

== Stage ==
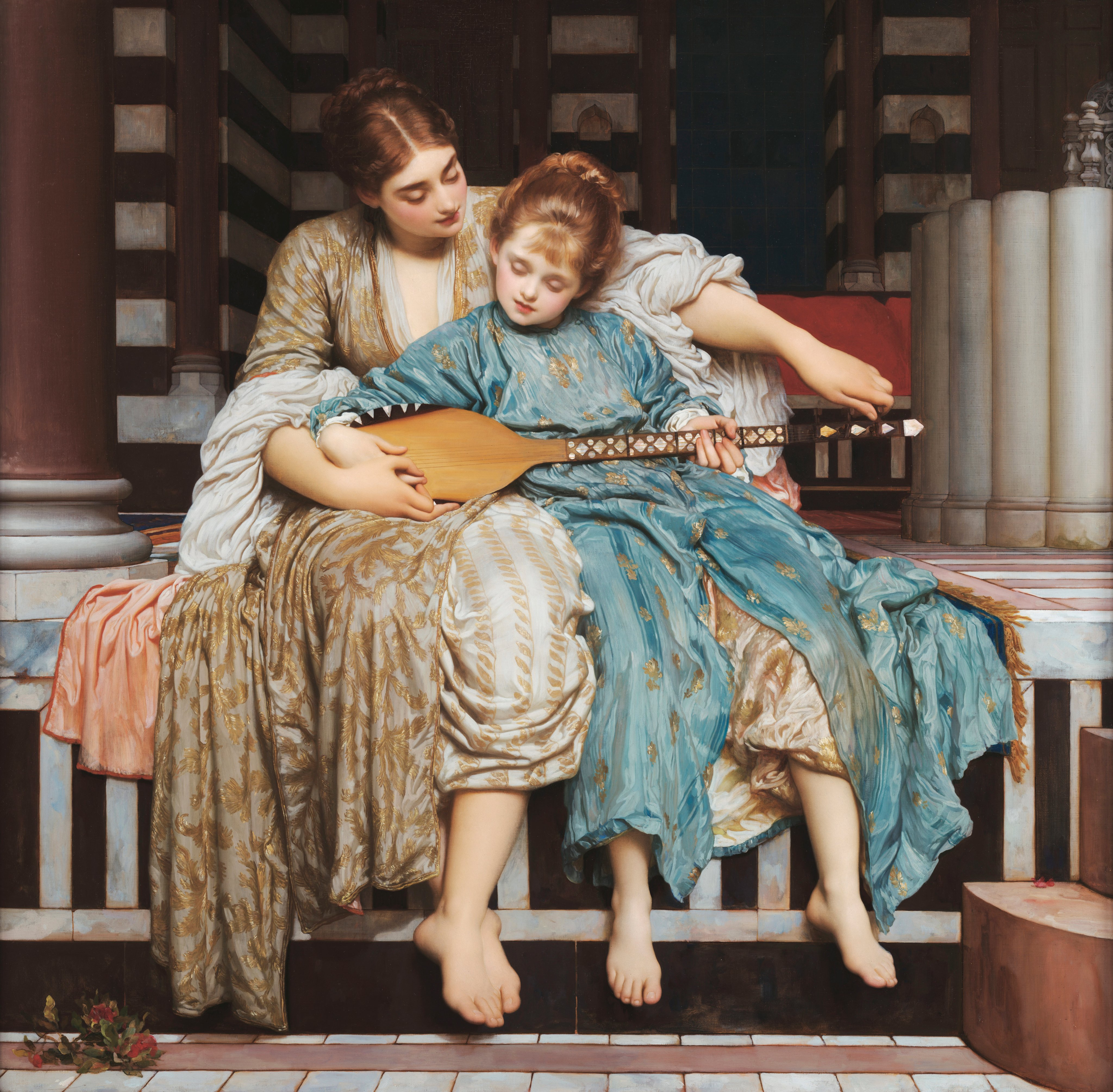
Gilchrist posed for the young child in Leighton's The Music Lesson, 1877

Gilchrist's first known stage appearance came by age 8 at the Drury Lane Theatre in 1873 playing the Prince of Mushrooms in a play entitled, Jack in the Box. Over the 1874–1875 Christmas season, she played Harlequin in an all-children's cast of the pantomime The Children of the Wood, an adaptation of a Brothers Grimm fairy tale staged at the Adelphi Theatre London. Two years later, she was the harlequin in Goody Two-Shoes at the same theater.

Gilchrist was engaged at London's Gaiety Theatre in 1879, at age 14, where she played numerous roles, beginning with Tiddi-widdi in an adaptation of Gulliver and Colomba in The Great Casmir by Charles Lecocq and Henry S. Leigh, adapted from the French of J. Prevel and A. D. Saint Albin (both 1879). In 1880 she played Libby Ray in the Benjamin Edward Woolf comic opera The Mighty Dollar; Baron Montgiron in The Corsican Brothers and Co., Limited by F. C. Burnand and H. P. Stephens; and Polly in Bubbles by Charles L. Fawcett. She played Florence Dombey in Captain Cuttle, adapted from Dicken's Dombey and Son by John Brougham; and Lord Lardida, Baron de Belgravia, in Whittington and his Cat by Burnand (both in 1881); Maid Marian in Little Robin Hood by Robert Reece (1882); Anne in the Victorian burlesque Blue Beard; or, The Hazard of the Dye, by Burnand; Miranda in Ariel, a parody of Shakespeare's The Tempest; and Myrene in the Stephens and Lutz burlesque Galatea; or, Pygmalion Re-Versed (all in 1883); and Pauline in Called There and Back, Herman Charles Merivale's burlesque of the Conway and Carr play, Called Back (1884).

In the summer of 1886, Gilchrist turned 21 and came to America with the Violet Cameron Comic Opera Company for an American tour that began at New York's Casino Theatre with The Commodore, an adaptation by Henry Brougham Farnie of Offenbach's, Le Creol. From 27 December of that year she played Abdallah in The Forty Thieves, a pantomime adaption of the classic by E. L. Blanchard staged at the Drury Lane Theatre.

== Earl of Orkney ==
Gilchrist was the mistress of two aristocrats. The first, the 4th Earl of Lonsdale, purchased a house in London for her and the other girls of the Gaiety Theatre. Lord Lonsdale died in 1882 at the house, a matter of some scandal. He bequeathed it, and a sizeable legacy, to Gilchrist. Her second benefactor was the 8th Duke of Beaufort, who became her adoptive father. In July 1892, Gilchrist married Edmond FitzMaurice, 7th Earl of Orkney. Though a Scottish peer, he owned no property or other title there, but had inherited an estate in Buckinghamshire and some 11,000 acres in County Laois and County Kerry in Ireland that brought him an approximate £6,000 annual income in rents. After their marriage the couple quietly retired to Tythe House, Lord Orkney's estate in Stewkley, as they were largely excluded from British upper class circles at the time. This did not seem to bother Gilchrist, who settled into country life and became known for generous contributions to local charities. Over their early years Gilchrist and her husband operated a hunting lodge on the estate grounds that led to a friendship with the family of Baron Rothschild. A hunting accident in 1906 ended Gilchrist's participation in such forays.

== Death ==
Gilchrist died at Tythe House on 9 May 1946 after 53 years of marriage. The Earl of Orkney lived another five years, dying on 21 August 1951. Their only child, Lady Mary Constance Hamilton Gosling, survived her but had no issue and predeceased her father by 10 months, with the title of Earl of Orkney being inherited by the Earl's first cousin twice removed, Cecil FitzMaurice, 8th Earl of Orkney.

== See also ==
- List of entertainers who married titled Britons
