= Petty-Fitzmaurice =

PETTY-FITZMAURICE
Origin
- Region of origin: Ireland

Other names
- Variant form: FitzMaurice

Petty-Fitzmaurice is a double-barrelled surname of Irish origin.

People with the name Petty-Fitzmaurice include:

- Charles Petty-Fitzmaurice, 7th Marquess of Lansdowne (1917–1944), peer of Great Britain
- Charles Petty-Fitzmaurice, 9th Marquess of Lansdowne (born 1941), British peer
- Lord Charles Petty-FitzMaurice (1874–1914), British soldier and courtier
- Emily Petty-Fitzmaurice, Marchioness of Lansdowne (1819–1895), British peer
- George Petty-Fitzmaurice, 8th Marquess of Lansdowne (1912–1997), British peer
- Georgina Elizabeth Petty-Fitzmaurice (born 1950), Scottish nobility
- Henry Petty-Fitzmaurice, 3rd Marquess of Lansdowne (1780–1863), Irish peer
- Henry Petty-Fitzmaurice, 4th Marquess of Lansdowne (1816–1866), British politician
- Henry Petty-Fitzmaurice, 5th Marquess of Lansdowne (1845–1927), British politician and Irish peer
- Henry Petty-Fitzmaurice, 6th Marquess of Lansdowne (1872–1936), Earl of Kerry
- Maud Petty-FitzMaurice, Marchioness of Lansdowne (1850–1932), British courtier
- John Petty Fitzmaurice, 1st Earl of Shelburne. PC(Ire) (1706–1761)
- William Petty FitzMaurice,(1737–1805). 2nd Earl of Shelbourne, 1st Marquess of Lansdowne PC(Ire) KG. British Prime Minister (1782_1783).

== See also ==
- Fitzmaurice
- Fitzmorris
