= Magnus II =

Magnus II may refer to:

- Magnus II of Norway (1048–1069), King of Norway from 1066 to 1069
- Magnus Barefoot (1073–1103), King of Norway from 1093 to 1103
- Magnus II, Earl of Orkney (c. 1184 – 1239)
- Magnus II, Duke of Brunswick-Lüneburg (c. 1328 – 1373), called Magnus with the necklace
- Magnus Henriksson, King of Sweden from 1160 to 1161
- Magnus Ladulås (c. 1240– 1290), King of Sweden from 1275 to 1290
- Magnus Eriksson (1316–1374), King of Sweden (1319–1364) and Norway (1319–1355)
- Magnus II, Duke of Mecklenburg (1441–1503), Duke of Mecklenburg-Schwerin from 1477 to 1503
- Magnus II, Duke of Saxe-Lauenburg (1543–1603)
