= Peter St John, 9th Earl of Orkney =

Canadian political scientist and Scottish peer

The Right Honourable The Earl of Orkney
- Born: Oliver Peter St John; 27 February 1938 (age 88); Victoria, British Columbia, Canada
- Spouses: Mary Juliet Scott-Brown (m. 1963; div. 1985); Barbara Huck (m. 1985)

Academic background
- Education: University of British Columbia; London School of Economics

Academic work
- Discipline: Political science
- Sub-discipline: International relations
- Institutions: University College, London; University of Manitoba
- Main interests: Terrorism

Oliver Peter St John, 9th Earl of Orkney (Note: Pronounced SIN-jun.) (born 27 February 1938) is a retired Canadian political scientist and Scottish peer.

He inherited the Earldom of Orkney in 1998 and briefly had a right to a seat in the House of Lords until the House of Lords Act 1999 came into effect.

== Early life ==
Orkney is the son of Lieutenant Colonel Frederick Oliver St John, whose parents were Sir Frederic Robert St John and his wife Isabella Annie FitzMaurice, a granddaughter of the 5th Earl of Orkney.

Born in Victoria, British Columbia, he was educated at Woodbridge School in England, the University of Lausanne, studying French language & literature, the University of British Columbia, graduating BA in Political Studies in 1960, and the London School of Economics, graduating MA in International Relations in 1963. He went on to gain a PhD in International Relations from the University of London. In 1958 he was recognized as International Student of the Year.

== Career ==
In his academic career, St. John was a lecturer at University College London, England, before moving to the University of Manitoba, Canada, where he rose to become professor of political studies. He retired from academia in 1998, the year he succeeded to the Earldom of Orkney, and was appointed a senior scholar by Manitoba.

He inherited the earldom after his father's maternal relative Cecil FitzMaurice, 8th Earl of Orkney died childless in 1998 and briefly had a right to a seat in the House of Lords until the House of Lords Act 1999 came into effect.

== Personal life ==
In 1963, in Marylebone, St John married firstly Mary Juliet Scott-Brown, daughter of Dr W. G. Scott-Brown CVO FRCS. Together they had one son and three daughters. Their son, Oliver Robert St John, Viscount Kirkwall, is heir to the earldom. After his first marriage ended in divorce in 1985, in that year he married secondly Mary Barbara Huck, daughter of Dr David B. Albertson, gaining four step-children. As a male-line descendant of the 3rd Viscount Bolingbroke, he is also in remainder to that title.

== Selected works ==
- St. John, Peter (1977). Fireproof House to Third Option: Studies in the Theory and Practise of Canadian Foreign Policy. Winnipeg, Manitoba: University of Manitoba.
- St. John, Peter, ed. (1984). Mackenzie King to Philosopher King: Canadian Foreign Policy in a Modern Age. Winnipeg, Manitoba: University of Manitoba Press.
- St. John, Peter (1991). Air Piracy, Airport Security, and International Terrorism: Winning the War Against Hijackers. New York: Quorum Books. ISBN 978-0899304137.
- St. John, Peter, ed. (2005). From the Great War to the Global Village: A Window on the World. Winnipeg, Manitoba: Heartland Associates. ISBN 978-1896150239.

== Notes ==
Peerage of Scotland
Preceded by Cecil FitzMaurice	Earl of Orkney; 1998–present	Incumbent; Heir: Oliver St John
