= David Haraldsson =

David Haraldsson was joint Earl of Orkney from 1206 to 1214. David Haraldsson and his brother Jon Haraldsson were the sons of Harald Maddadsson with his second wife Hvarflod, daughter of Earl Máel Coluim of Moray. Jon and David became joint Earls of Orkney after the death of their father in 1206. David Haraldsson died of sickness in 1214, leaving Jon Haraldsson to rule alone.

== Sources ==
- Pálsson, Hermann and Paul Edwards, tr. Orkneyinga Saga: The History of the Earls of Orkney (Penguin, London, 1978)
