= Magnus III of Orkney =

Magnus (III) Gibbonsson (1256-1273) was an Earl of Caithness and Orkney. He was the son of Gilbert, Earl of Orkney, and grandson of Magnus II, Earl of Orkney.

== Reign ==
Magnus III was the reason that the disputes between his two overlords, Håkon IV of Norway for Orkney and Alexander III of Scotland for Caithness transformed into open conflict the Scottish-Norwegian War.

Scottish provocations against Norwegian vassals in the Hebrides led Håkon IV of Norway to undertake a punitive expedition to reassert his suzerainty under his western island domains. Magnus Gibbonsson was summoned to Bergen and placed at the head of part of the Norwegian fleet which sailed towards Shetland and Orkney in order to strengthen itself. After the Battle of Largs, King Håkon IV of Norway, aged and tired, decided to winter in Orkney where he died in 1263. The Treaty of Perth, signed in 1266, between Scotland and the new King Magnus VI of Norway ended to the conflict and maintained Norwegian suzerainty over Orkney.

The death of Magnus is noted in 1273 by the "Annals of Iceland." He was succeeded by his eldest son Magnus Magnusson.

Preceded by Gilbert, Earl of Orkney	Earl of Orkney; 1256-1273	Succeeded by Magnus Magnusson, Earl of Orkney
