= The Music Lesson (Leighton) =

Painting by Frederic Leighton

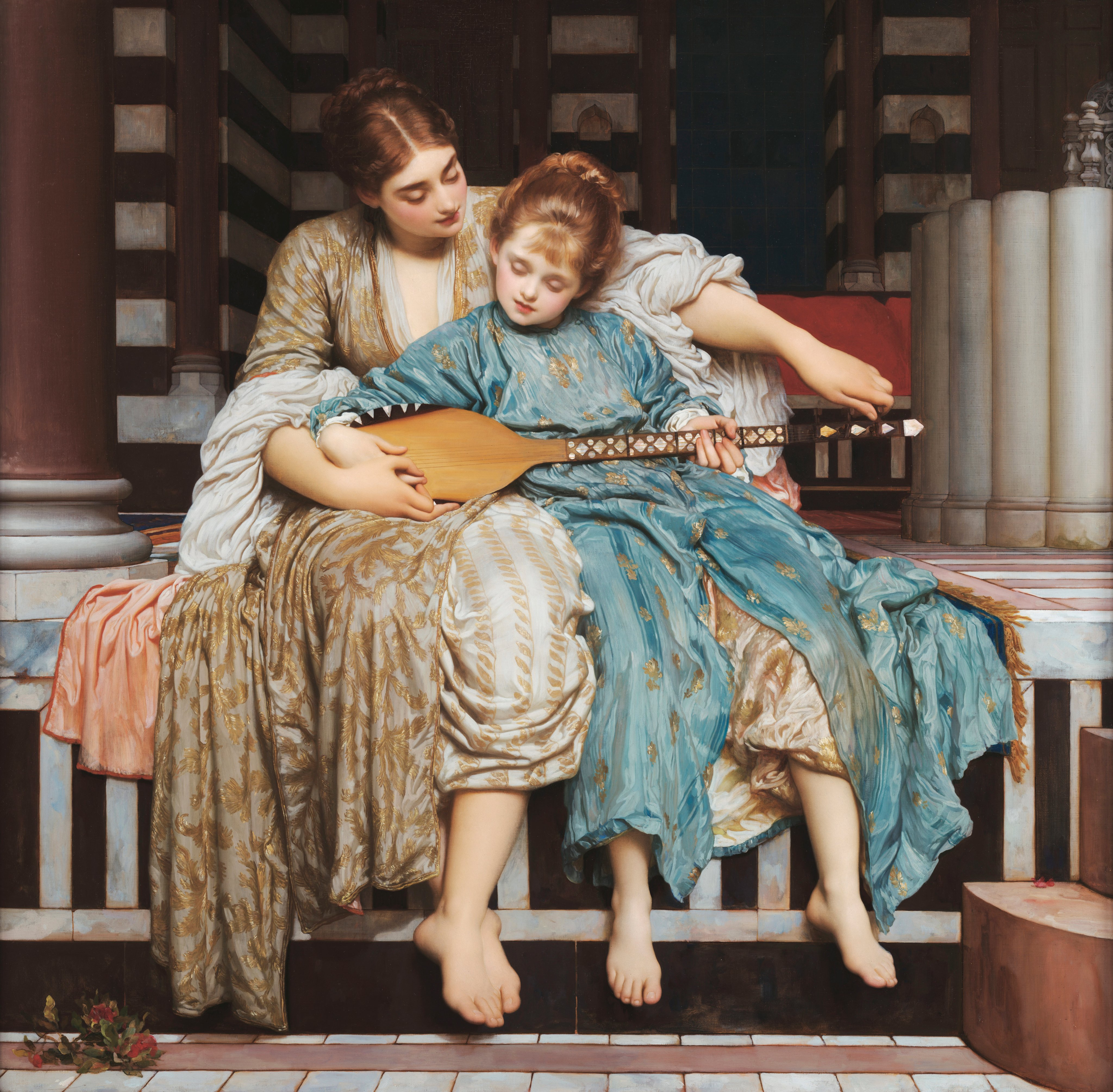
- Artist: Frederic Leighton
- Year: 1877
- Medium: Oil on canvas
- Dimensions: 93 cm × 95 cm (37 in × 37 in)
- Location: Guildhall Art Gallery

The Music Lesson is an oil painting by Frederic Leighton, first exhibited in 1877. The painting depicts a young girl, Connie GIlchrist, being taught to play the saz.

== Exhibition ==
The Exhibition of 1877 of the Royal Academy of Arts included a picture from Leighton's studio, entitled The Music Lesson. Early in 1878 Leighton was appointed president of the jury on paintings at the Paris International Exhibition, to which exhibition he contributed Elijah in the Wilderness, The Music Lesson, and Captain Richard Burton, H.M.'s Consul at Trieste.

== Analysis ==
Edgcumbe Staley admired the composition:

The masterly entanglement of the two lovely forms—typical and ideal—as they sit side by side on the black-and-white marble bench, is marked with intense sincerity. Nothing can exceed the delicate articulation of the hands of the two figures—mother and child, or sister. Their feet are chastely disposed and chiselled with the gentlest touch. The pose is easy and graceful. The loving way in which the elder figure places the child's hands upon the guitar as with the other hand she tunes the instrument is natural and convincing. The whole composition breathes an atmosphere of pure refinement and is the very embodiment of rhythm. The Eastern draperies are wonderfully arranged, every fold adding its light or shade in due ratio. The simple pale blue dress of the child accords absolutely with her tender carnations; whilst the white and gold-embroidered robe of the elder girl, or woman—loose and elegant—is in strict keeping, as regards good taste and the true sequence of colours. The bits of pomegranate—so often used as highest points by Leighton—are beautifully detailed. To show that the artist himself set great store by this picture, he has left a "figurine" group of the two female figures which he used for this composition as well as for the "Daphnephoria".

Ernest Rhys praised the beauty of the colouring:

Imagine a classical marble hall, marble floor, marble walls, in black and white, and red—deep red—marble pillars; and sitting there, sumptuously attired, but bare-footed, two fair-haired girls, who serve for pupil and music-mistress. The elder is showing the younger how to finger a lyre, of exquisite design and finish; and the expression on their faces is charmingly true, while the colours that they contribute to the composition,—the pale blue of the child's dress, the pale flesh tints, the pale yellow hair, and the white and gold of the elder girl's loose robe, and the rich auburn of her hair,—are most harmonious. A bit of scarlet pomegranate blossom, lying on the marble ground, gives the last high note of colour to the picture.

== See also ==
- Academic art
- Orientalism

== Sources ==
- Ash, Russell (1995). Lord Leighton. London: Pavilion Books Limited. p. 53 [Plate 19].
- Jones, Stephen, et al. (1996). Frederic Leighton, 1830–1896. Royal Academy of Arts, London: Harry N. Abrams, Inc. pp. 147, 179, 185, 203.
- Rhys, Ernest (1900). Frederic Lord Leighton: An Illustrated Record of his Life and Work. London: George Bell & Sons. pp. 36–37, 126.
- Staley, Edgcumbe (1906). Lord Leighton of Stretton. London: The Walter Scott Publishing Co., Ltd.; New York: Charles Scribner's Sons. pp. 107–108, 110, 112.
- "The Music Lesson". The Victorian Web. 8 February 2015. Accessed 2 July 2022.
