= Earldom of Orkney =

Medieval Norse earldom

Earldom of Orkney Orkneyjar / Norðreyjar (Old Norse)
- c. 872–1231; c. 1236–1472
- The Earldom of Orkney/Norðr in the 11th century, shaded brown, with the Kingdom of the Isles/Sodor shaded red.
- Status: Dependency of Norway
- Capital: Kirkjuvagr
- Common languages: Norn, Old Norse
- Religion: Norse Paganism, Christianity
- Jarl (Earl) of Orkney
  - c.872–c. 892: Sigurd Eysteinsson (first)
  - 1206–1231: Jon Haraldsson (last Norse jarl)
  - 1434–1470: William Sinclair (last jarl under Norwegian Crown)
- Historical era: Middle Ages
Preceded by	Succeeded by
Picts	Kingdom of Scotland

The Earldom of Orkney was a Norse territory ruled by the earls (or jarls) of Orkney from the ninth century until 1472. It was founded during the Viking Age by Viking raiders and settlers from Scandinavia (see Scandinavian Scotland). In the ninth and tenth centuries it covered the Northern Isles (Norðreyjar) of Orkney and Shetland, as well as Caithness and Sutherland on the mainland. It was a dependent territory of the Kingdom of Norway until 1472, when it was absorbed into the Kingdom of Scotland. Originally, the title of Jarl or Earl of Orkney was heritable.

== History ==
The Northern Isles of Orkney and Shetland lie off the northernmost tip of Britain. By the Iron Age, they were part of the Pictish kingdom. From the late 8th century AD, the Picts were gradually dispossessed of the islands by the Norse from Scandinavia. The nature of this change is controversial, and theories range from peaceful integration to enslavement and genocide.

Orkney and Shetland saw a significant influx of Norse settlers during the late 8th and early 9th centuries. Norse Vikings made the islands the headquarters of their pirate expeditions carried out against Norway and the coasts of mainland Scotland. In response, Norwegian king Harald Fairhair (Harald Hårfagre) is said to have annexed the Northern Isles in 875; although it is clear that this story, which appears in the Orkneyinga Saga, is based on the later voyages of Magnus Barelegs, and some scholars believe it to be apocryphal. Rognvald Eysteinsson received Orkney and Shetland from Harald as an earldom as reparation for the death of his son in battle in Scotland, and then passed the earldom on to his brother Sigurd the Mighty (ruled c. 875–892).

However, Sigurd's line barely survived him and it was Torf-Einarr (ruled c.895–910), Rognvald's son by a slave, who founded a dynasty that controlled the islands for centuries after his death. (Note: Sigurd The Mighty's son Gurthorm ruled for a single winter after Sigurd's death and died childless. Rognvald's son Hallad inherited the title but, unable to constrain Danish raids in Orkney, he gave up the earldom and returned to Norway, which according to the Orkneyinga Saga "everyone thought was a huge joke.") He was succeeded by his son Thorfinn Skull-splitter (c.910–963) and during this time the deposed Norwegian King Eric Bloodaxe often used Orkney as a raiding base before being killed in 954. Thorfinn's death and presumed burial at the broch of Hoxa, on South Ronaldsay, led to a long period of dynastic strife.

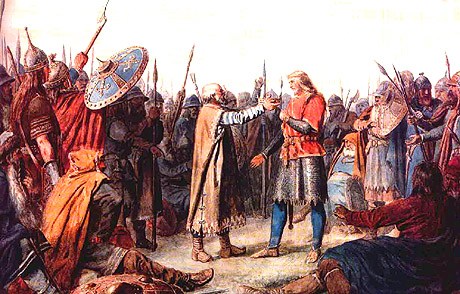
Artist's conception of King Olaf Tryggvason of Norway, who forcibly Christianised Orkney. Painting by Peter Nicolai Arbo.

Initially a pagan culture, detailed information about the Christianization of Scotland's isles during the Norse era is elusive. The Orkneyinga Saga suggests the islands were Christianized by Olaf Tryggvasson in 995 when he stopped at South Walls on his way from Ireland to Norway. The saga says the king summoned the jarl Sigurd the Stout and said, "I order you and all your subjects to be baptised. If you refuse, I'll have you killed on the spot and I swear I will ravage every island with fire and steel." Unsurprisingly, Sigurd agreed and the islands became Christian at a stroke, receiving their own bishop in the early 11th century. (Note: The first recorded bishop was Henry of Lund (also known as "the Fat") who was appointed sometime prior to 1035. The bishopric appears to have been under the authority of the Archbishops of York and of Hamburg-Bremen at different times during the early period and from the mid-twelfth century to 1472 was subordinate to the Archbishop of Nidaros (today's Trondheim).)

Thorfinn the Mighty (c.1025–1064) was a son of Sigurd and a grandson of King Malcolm II of Scotland (Máel Coluim mac Cináeda). Along with Sigurd's other sons he ruled Orkney and Shetland during the first half of the 11th century and extended his authority over the Kingdom of the Isles. Thorfinn's sons Paul and Erlend succeeded him, fighting at the Battle of Stamford Bridge in 1066. Paul and Erlend quarreled as adults and this dispute carried on to the next generation. The martyrdom of Magnus Erlendsson, who was killed in April 1116 by his cousin Haakon Paulsson, resulted in the building of St Magnus Cathedral, still today a dominating feature of Kirkwall. (Note: The Scandinavian peoples, relatively recent converts to Christianity, had a tendency to confer martyrdom and sainthood on leading figures of the day who met violent deaths. Magnus and Haakon Paulsson had been co-rulers of Orkney, and although he had a reputation for piety, there is no suggestion that Magnus died for his Christian faith.)

Unusually, from c. 1100 onwards the Norse jarls owed allegiance both to the Norwegian crown for Orkney and to the Scottish crown through their holdings as Earls of Caithness. In 1231 the line of Norse earls, unbroken since Rognvald, ended with Jon Haraldsson's murder in Thurso. The Earldom of Caithness was granted to Magnus, second son of the Earl of Angus, whom Haakon IV of Norway confirmed as Earl of Orkney in 1236. In 1290, the death of the child princess Margaret, Maid of Norway in Orkney, en route to mainland Scotland, caused a disputed succession that led to the Wars of Scottish Independence. In 1379 the earldom passed to the Sinclair family, who were also barons of Roslin near Edinburgh.

In 1468 Orkney and Shetland were pledged by Christian I, in his capacity as King of Norway, as security against the payment of the dowry of his daughter Margaret, who was betrothed to James III of Scotland. However the money was never paid, and Orkney was absorbed by the Kingdom of Scotland in 1472. The last Earl of Orkney to hold the title under the Norwegian crown was William Sinclair, Earl of Orkney.

== See also ==
- Kingdom of the Isles
