= George FitzMaurice, 6th Earl of Orkney =

Scottish nobleman and soldier

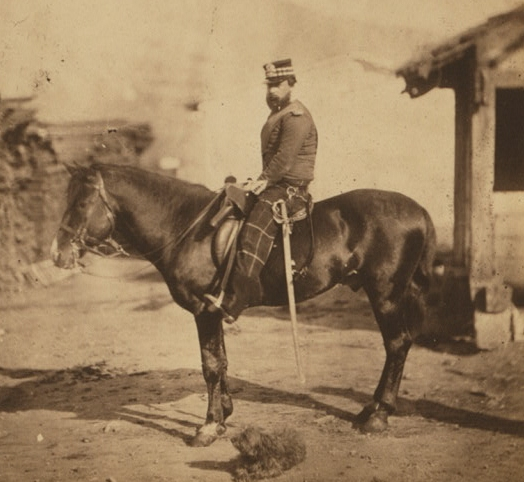
FitzMaurice, then Viscount Kirkwall, in Crimea as a captain in the 71st Highlanders.

George William Hamilton FitzMaurice, 6th Earl of Orkney KCMG (6 May 1827 – 21 October 1889), styled as Viscount Kirkwall until 1877, was a soldier and Scottish nobleman.

George FitzMaurice was the son of Thomas FitzMaurice, 5th Earl of Orkney and the Hon. Charlotte Irby. He married Amelia de Samuel in London in 1872. They had no children.

He joined the 71st Highlanders Regiment as a Captain from the 92nd Regiment in 1853 and saw action in the Crimea in 1855. He transferred to the Scots Fusilier Guards in 1856 and retired in 1857.

On his death in London, the title passed to his nephew, Edmond FitzMaurice, 7th Earl of Orkney.

== Freemasonry ==
He was a Scottish Freemason. He was Initiated in Lodge Canongate Kilwinning, No. 2, on 17 December 1845. In the Lodge's records of that time he is correctly styled as Viscount Kirkwall.

Peerage of Scotland
| Preceded by Thomas FitzMaurice | Earl of Orkney; 1877–1889 | Succeeded by Edmond FitzMaurice |
