= Earl of Orkney =

Noble title over northern Scotland

Earldom of Orkney
- Arms of the earldom of Orkney
- Creation date: c. 872
- Created by: King Harald I
- First holder: Sigurd Eysteinsson
- Present holder: Peter St. John
- Heir apparent: Oliver St. John
- Extinction date: 1472 (first creation); 1614 (second creation)
- Seat: Earl's Palace, Kirkwall
- Former seats: Brough of Birsay; Earl's Palace, Birsay

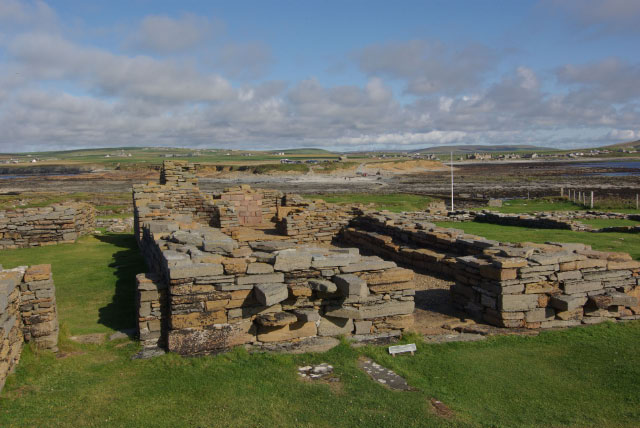
Ruins on the Brough of Birsay, once the seat of the early Norse jarls of Orkney. The Brough is now a tidal islet but in earlier times it was connected to Mainland Orkney by an isthmus.

Earl of Orkney, historically Jarl of Orkney, is a title of nobility encompassing the archipelagoes of Orkney and Shetland, which comprise the Northern Isles of Scotland. Originally founded by Norse invaders, the status of the rulers of the Northern Isles as Norwegian vassals was formalised in 1195. Although the Old Norse term jarl is etymologically related to earl, and the jarls were succeeded by earls in the late 15th century, a Norwegian jarl is not the same thing. In the Norse context the distinction between jarls and kings did not become significant until the late 11th century and the early jarls would therefore have had considerable independence of action until that time. The position of Jarl of Orkney was eventually the most senior rank in medieval Norway except for the king himself.

The jarls were periodically subject to the kings of Alba for those parts of their territory in what is now mainland Scotland (i.e. Caithness and Sutherland). In 1232, a Scottish dynasty descended from the mormaers of Angus replaced the previous family descended from the late 10th century jarl Torf-Einarr, although the isles remained formally subject to Norway. This family was in turn replaced by the descendants of the mormaers of Strathearn and later still by the Sinclair family, during whose time Orkney and Shetland became part of Scotland.

The second earldom was created by James VI of Scotland in 1581 for his half-uncle Robert Stewart but after only two incumbents the title was forfeited in 1614. After the third creation of 1696, a title that still exists today, the earls' influence on Orcadian affairs became negligible.

== Norse Jarls ==
Jarldom of Orkney (Norse)
- Creation date: c. 892
- Created by: Haraldr Hárfagri?
- Peerage: Peerage of Norway
- First holder: Sigurd Eysteinsson
- Last holder: Jon Haraldsson
- Subsidiary titles: Mormaer of Caithness
- Status: Extinct
- Extinction date: 1230
- Former seat: Brough of Birsay

Rognvald Eysteinsson, Jarl of Møre fl. 865–890 (Note: Assuming an identification of Rognvald with "Ragnall son of Albdann" in 865.) is sometimes credited with being the founder of the jarldom of Orkney. By implication the Orkneyinga saga identifies him as such for he is given "dominion" over Orkney and Shetland by King Harald Finehair, although there is no concrete suggestion he ever held the title. The Heimskringla states that his brother Sigurd was the first to formally hold the title.

Sigurd's son Guthorm ruled for a year and died childless. Rognvald's son Hallad then inherited the title. However, unable to constrain Danish raids on Orkney, he gave up the jarldom and returned to Norway, which "everyone thought was a huge joke". Torf-Einarr then succeeded in defeating the Danes and founded a dynasty that retained control of the islands for centuries after his death. Smyth concludes that the role of the brothers Eysteinsson lacks historical credibility and that Torf-Einarr "may be regarded as the first historical earl of Orkney".

Drawing on Adam of Bremen's assertion that Orkney was not conquered until the time of Harald Hardrada, who ruled Norway from 1043 to 1066, Woolf speculates that Sigurd "the Stout" Hlodvirsson, Torf-Einarr's great-grandson, may have been the first Jarl of Orkney. Dates are largely conjectural, at least until his death recorded in 1014.

Assuming Torf-Einarr is a genuine historical figure, all of the subsequent jarls were descended from him, save for Sigurd Magnusson, whose short rule was imposed by his father Magnus Barelegs, and who later became Sigurd I of Norway. (Note: Anders Stølen has argued that Magnus Barelegs's mother was a daughter of "Ragnvald jarl" as stated in the genealogical text Sunnmørsættleggen who has in turn been identified as Rognvald Brusason (grandson of Sigurd Hlodvirsson) by Ola Kvalsund.)

One of the main sources for the lives and times of these jarls is the Orkneyinga saga, which has been described as having "no parallel in the social and literary record of Scotland". One of the key events of the saga is the "martyrdom" of Jarl Magnus Erlendsson, later Saint Magnus, c. 1115. The last quarter of the saga is taken up with a lengthy tale of Jarl Rögnvald Kali Kolsson and Sweyn Asleifsson — indeed the oldest version ends with the latter's death in 1171.

After the murder of Jarl Jon Haraldsson some sixty years later, Magnus, son of Gille Brigte became the first of the Scottish earls. He may have been a descendant of Jarl Rögnvald Kali Kolsson, although this has never been corroborated. However, the line of specifically Norse jarls is said to have come to an end when Jarl Magnus II was granted his title by Haakon IV of Norway c. 1236.

Name	Byname	Relationship to predecessor	Rule commences	Rule ends
Sigurd Eysteinsson	Sigurðr inn riki "the Mighty"	Brother of Rognvald Eysteinsson		c. 892 (Note: Muir (2008) suggests Sigurd Eysteinsson may have died c. 874.)
Guthorm Sigurdsson		Son of Sigurd Eysteinsson	c. 892	c. 893
Hallad Rognvaldsson		Son of Rognvald Eysteinsson	c. 893	c. 895
Einarr Rognvaldsson	Torf-Einarr "Turf"-Einarr	Son of Rognvald Eysteinsson	c. 895	910
Arnkel Torf-Einarsson		Son of Torf-Einarr Rognvaldsson	910	with Erlend and Thorfinn to 954 (Note: Date of death based on the assumption Arnkel and Erlend Turf-Einarsson died at the Battle of Stainmore beside Eric Bloodaxe.)
Erlend Torf-Einarsson		Son of Torf-Einarr Rognvaldsson	910	with Arnkel and Thorfinn to 954
Thorfinn Torf-Einarsson	Þorfinnr hausakljúfr "Skull-splitter"	Son of Torf-Einarr Rognvaldsson	910	with Erlend and Arnkel to 954 alone 954–963 (Note: Muir (2005) has a death date for Thorfinn of 976, which leaves only four years for three subsequent jarls to rule before his son Hlodvir.)
Arnfinn Thorfinnsson		Son of Thorfinn Torf-Einarsson	963	
Havard Thorfinnsson	Hávarðr inn ársæli "Harvest-happy"	Son of Thorfinn Torf-Einarsson	On Arnfinn's death	
Ljot Thorfinnsson		Son of Thorfinn Torf-Einarsson	On Havard's death	c. 980 (Note: Muir (2005) dates the meeting of Ljot's brother Skuli with Malcolm II to 978. Subsequent to that Skuli and "Earl MacBeth" fought two battles with Ljot. Skuli was killed in the first, Ljot in the second. Historic Environment Scotland states that the battle at Skitten Mire where Ljot Thorfinnsson was mortally wounded took place "between 943 and 945" although this does not square with either Muir (2005) or Earl Thorfinn (his father) dying c. 963.)
Hlodvir Thorfinnsson		Son of Thorfinn Torf-Einarsson	c. 980	991 (Note: Woolf (2007) implies Hlodvir's death may have taken place earlier as his son Sigurd "may well have been an active leader since the 980s".)
Sigurd Hlodvirsson	Sigurðr digri "the Stout"	Son of Hlodvir Thorfinnsson	991	1014
Sumarlidi Sigurdsson		Son of Sigurd Hlodvirsson	1014	with Brusi and Einar to c. 1016 (Note: "He died in his bed not long after his father's death" and is not referred to in an incident dated to 1018.)
Brusi Sigurdsson		Son of Sigurd Hlodvirsson	1014	with Einar and Sumarlidi to 1016 with Einar to 1025 with Einar and Thorfinn to c. 1031
Einar Sigurdsson	Einar rangmunnr "Wry-mouth"	Son of Sigurd Hlodvirsson	1014	with Brusi and Sumarlidi to 1016 with Brusi to 1025 with Brusi and Thorfinn to 1026
Thorfinn Sigurdsson	Þorfinnr inn riki "the Mighty"	Son of Sigurd Hlodvirsson	c. 1025 (Note: "When Thorfinn came of age he asked Earl Einar for a third of the islands". Thorfinn is said to have been five years old when his father died at the Battle of Clontarf in 1014.)	with Brusi and Einar to 1026 with Brusi to 1031 alone to 1036 with Rögnvald 1036 to 1046 alone to c. 1064
Rögnvald Brusason		Son of Brusi Sigurdsson	c. 1036	with Thorfinn to c. 1046
Paul and Erlend Thorfinnsson		Sons of Thorfinn Sigurdsson, co-rulers, later deposed together	1064	1098
Sigurd Magnusson	Sigurðr Jórsalafari "the Jerusalem-farer"	Son of Magnus Barelegs	1098	1103
Haakon Paulsson		Son of Paul Thorfinnsson	1104	alone to 1106 with Magnus to 1116 alone to 1123
Magnus Erlendsson	Later "Saint Magnus"	Son of Erlend Thorfinnsson	1106	with Haakon to 1116
Harald Haakonsson	"Smooth-tongue"	Son of Haakon Paulsson	1123	with Paul to c. 1130
Paul Haakonsson		Son of Haakon Paulsson	1123	with Harald to 1130 alone to 1136
Rögnvald Kali Kolsson	Later "Saint Rögnvald"	Son of Gunnhild, daughter of Erlend Thorfinnsson	1136	alone to 1138 with Harald Maddadsson 1138 to 1151 and 1154 to 1158 with Harald and Erlend Haraldsson 1151 to 1154
Harald Maddadsson	"the Old"	Son of Margaret, daughter of Haakon Paulsson	1138	with Rögnvald to 1151 and 1154 to 1158 with Rögnvald and Erlend Haraldsson 1151 to 1154 alone 1158 to 1191 with Harald Eiriksson to 1198 alone to 1206
Erlend Haraldsson		Son of Harald Haakonsson	1151	with Harald Maddadsson and Rögnvald Kali Kolsson to 1154
Harald Eiriksson	Haraldr ungi "the Young"	Son of Ingiríðr, daughter of Rögnvald Kali Kolsson	1191	with Harald Maddadsson to 1198
David Haraldsson		Son of Harald Maddadsson	1206	with Jon to 1214
Jon Haraldsson		Son of Harald Maddadsson	1206	with David to 1214 alone to 1231

== Scottish Jarls under the Norwegian Crown ==
Jarldom of Orkney (Scots)
- Creation date: c. 1236
- Created by: Haakon Haakonsson
- Peerage: Peerage of Norway
- First holder: Magnus
- Last holder: William Sinclair
- Subsidiary titles: Mormaer of Caithness
- Status: Extinct
- Extinction date: 1472

After the close of the Jarls' Saga on the death of Jon Haraldsson in 1230, the history of Orkney is "plunged into a darkness which is illuminated by very few written sources". The first jarl known to have held the title after the Norse dynasty came to and end in 1230 was Magnus II but the title may have been held by an unknown other prior to his investiture. Although successive jarls of Orkney were related, they each acquired the position by being personally appointed to the role by the Norwegian king; the jarldom was not inheritable.

=== The Angus Jarls ===
Name	Relationship to predecessor	Rule commences	Rule ends
Magnus II	His parentage is unknown. Possibly a descendant of Ingrid, a daughter of Rögnvald Kali Kolsson.	1236	1239
?Gilbert	Possibly married to a niece of Magnus II, his existence is not certain.	1239	?
Gilbert (Gille Brigte)	Possibly the son of Gilbert, but there may have only been a single Gilbert.	?	1256
Magnus Gilbertsson	Son of Gilbert	1256	1273
Magnus Magnusson	Son of Magnus Gilbertsson.	1273	1284
Jón Magnússon	Son of Magnus Gilbertsson.	1284	1303
Magnus Jónsson	Son of Jón Magnússon.	1303	1320

=== Strathearn and Sinclair Jarls ===
Arms of the feudal Earldom of Orkney (Note: Blazon: "Azure, a lymphad at anchor or flagged gules sails furled argent oars erect in saltire within a double tressure flory of the second" as shown today in the 1st quarter of the arms of Sinclair, Earl of Caithness.)

The lack of haste with which a new title was granted by the Norwegians to Orkney has led to the suggestion that Magnus Jonsson may have had an heir who was a minor, but who died before 1330. It is also likely that unravelling the genealogy of his potential successors and providing proofs of their descent was a time-consuming project. Whatever the reason, about a decade after Magnus's death the title was granted to Maol Íosa, mormaer of Strathearn, a distant relative of Earl Gilbert. He ruled Orkney and Caithness from 1330 to 1350 and had several daughters, but no sons.

The earldom was then left vacant for about three years, (Note: Crawford (2013) states that there was no Earl of either Orkney or Caithness from c. 1350 to 1379 but later in the text elaborates on Erengisle Sunesson's status as earl from 1353-1360. It is possible Sunesson never actually visited the earldom although he continued to use the title for decades after the death of his wife prior to 1360, at which point his rights to it would have ceased.) following which Erengisle Sunesson was a titular earl for a few years but when his right to the title lapsed prior to 1360 the jarldom lay vacant again. King Haakon VI of Norway had married Margaret, the daughter of King Valdemar IV of Denmark. The sudden death of Haakon's brother King Eric XII of Sweden triggered the foreign policy obligations Haakon had to Valdemar, as a result of the marriage. These drew Haakon's attention away from Orkney, until the death of Valdemar, in 1375.

In 1375, Haakon decided upon Alexander of Ard, the son of Maol Íosa's daughter Matilda and Weland of Ard (Aird, west of Inverness) as Sunesson's successor. However, Alexander was merely appointed "Lieutenant, Captain and Keeper" of Orkney for a year on 30 June 1375. This was to be a probationary role, the intention being that if Haakon had been satisfied by Alexander's behaviour after a year, he would be appointed as jarl. However, Haakon did not do so, possibly because Alexander failed to deal with the violence that had become rife during the long absence of an earl's authority. In 1379, the jarldom was granted to another grandson of Maol Íosa, Henry Sinclair, by Haakon VI on 2 August 1379.

Name	Relationship to predecessor	Rule commences	Rule ends
Maol Íosa	A descendant of Malise II, Earl of Strathearn and Matilda, a daughter of Earl Gilbert.	1330	1350
Vacant		1350	1353
Erengisle Sunesson	Married to Agneta, daughter of Maol Íosa.	1353	before 1360
Vacant		before 1360	1375
Alexander of Ard	Son of Maol Íosa's daughter Matilda and Weland of Ard. Appointed as "Lieutenant" only.	1375	1376?
Vacant		1376	1379
Henry Sinclair	Son of Maol Íosa's daughter Isabella and William de Sinclair of Rosslyn.	1379	1401
Henry II	Son of Henry I	1404?	1420
William	Son of Henry II. David Menzies acted as "Guardian" from 1422 to 1434. William was de facto jarl from 1424. He was granted the newly created title "Earl of Caithness" in 1455.	1434	1470

When James III of Scotland married Margaret of Denmark, her father, Christian I, king of the Kalmar Union, was unable to immediately provide a dowry. Instead, he promised that he would provide the dowry at a later date, and pledged the Norðreyjar as security for his promise. In 1470, James persuaded William to quitclaim his rights over Orkney and Shetland only, in return for lands in Fife; technically the Norðreyjar remained in existence as a Norwegian Jarldom, but William's authority became limited to the mainland parts, while Orkney and Shetland became jarl-free. After a few years, it became clear that the dowry was unlikely ever to be paid, so in 1472, James declared the Norðreyjar to be forfeit (and forwent the dowry). As an immediate consequence, the diocese of Caithness was transferred from the Archdiocese of Niðaróss (Trondheim), in Norway, to that of St Andrews, in Scotland.

== Scottish Earls ==
=== Dukes of Orkney ===
- The next Orkney title was the dukedom of Orkney, which was given to James Hepburn, 4th Earl of Bothwell, husband of Mary, Queen of Scots, in 1567. Later that year, however, he forfeited the title when Mary was forced to abdicate.

=== Earls of Orkney, Second Creation ===
The second earldom was created by James VI of Scotland. The Stewart earls were based at Kirkwall Castle, which had been built by Henry I Sinclair. It was demolished on the forfeiture of the title in 1614.

Name	Relationship to predecessor	Rule commences	Rule ends
Robert Stewart	Illegitimate son of James V	1581	1593
Patrick Stewart, 2nd Earl of Orkney	Son of Robert Stewart	1593	1614 (forfeited)

=== Earls of Orkney, Third Creation (1696) ===
Earldom of Orkney (Third creation of 1696)
- Blazon. Quarterly: 1st grandquarters, Argent, on a Chief Gules two Mullets Or;2nd grandquarters, Argent on a Saltire Gules a Lymphad sails furled Or a Chief Ermine (Fitz-Maurice); 3rd grandquarter, quarterly: 1st and 4th, Gules three Cinquefoils Ermine (Hamilton); 2nd, Argent a Lymphad sails furled Sable (Arran); 3rd, Argent a Heart Gules imperially crowned Or on a Chief Azure three Mullets of the first (Douglas); over all at the fess point an Escallop Or for difference (for Lord George Hamilton, 1st Earl of Orkney); 4th grandquarter, quarterly: 1st and 4th, Gules three Lions passant guardant per pale Or and Argent (O'Brien); 2nd, Argent three Piles meeting in the point issuing from the chief Gules (Bryan); 3rd, Argent a Pheon Azure (Sydney).
- Creation date: 3 January 1696 (Third creation)
- Created by: William II of Scotland
- Peerage: Peerage of Scotland
- First holder: Lord George Hamilton
- Present holder: Peter St John, 9th Earl of Orkney
- Heir apparent: Oliver Robert St John, Viscount Kirkwall
- Subsidiary titles: Viscount of Kirkwall; Lord Dechmont

The last creation of the earldom, in 1696, was in favour of a man who in 1735 would become the first Field Marshal of Great Britain, Lord George Hamilton, the fifth son of William Douglas, Duke of Hamilton. The peerage was created with "remainder to the heirs whatsoever of his body", meaning that it can be inherited through both male and female lines. On his death, with no surviving son, it passed to his daughter Anne O'Brien, then later to the Fitzmaurice family, and later to the St John family. The subsidiary titles of Viscount of Kirkwall and Lord Dechmont were created at the same time as the earldom.

The earls of the third creation appear to have had little or no connection with Orkney, other than the title itself. It gave the first earl a seat in the Parliament of Scotland, which he lost when that came to an end in 1707. However, the Peerage Act 1963 gave all Scottish peers the right to sit in the House of Lords until the House of Lords Act 1999 removed them, unless elected by other peers.

The current earl was born and lives in Canada.

Name	Relationship to predecessor	Period
George Hamilton, 1st Earl of Orkney	None	1695–1737
Anne O'Brien, 2nd Countess of Orkney	Daughter of 1st Earl	1737–1756
Mary O'Brien, 3rd Countess of Orkney	Daughter of 2nd Countess	1756–1790
Mary FitzMaurice, 4th Countess of Orkney	Daughter of 3rd Countess	1790–1831
Thomas FitzMaurice, 5th Earl of Orkney	Grandson of 4th Countess	1831–1877
George FitzMaurice, 6th Earl of Orkney	Son of 5th Earl	1877–1889
Edmond FitzMaurice, 7th Earl of Orkney	Nephew of 6th Earl	1889–1951
Cecil FitzMaurice, 8th Earl of Orkney	First cousin twice removed of 7th Earl - great-grandson of Frederick Fitzmaurice, third son of the fifth Earl.	1951–1998
Peter St John, 9th Earl of Orkney	Third cousin of 8th Earl	1998 to date

The 9th Earl is the son of Frederick Oliver St John, son of Isabella Annie Fitzmaurice, daughter of James Terence Fitzmaurice, fifth son of the fifth Earl. The heir apparent is the present holder's son Oliver Robert St John (b. 1969), who holds the courtesy title, Viscount Kirkwall.

Earl of Orkney is also a separate, non-peerage earldom in the Baronage of Scotland. An earl in the Baronage of Scotland is also always a Scots baron.

=== Arms ===
Coat of arms of the Earl of Orkney
Notes Coat of arms of the 8th earl. Crest 1st: A Sagittarius passant proper (FitzMaurice); 2nd: An Ancient Boat Or flagged Azure and issuant therefrom an Oak Tree fructed and penetrated by a Framesaw proper the Frame Or (Hamilton). Escutcheon Quarterly: 1st and 4th grandquarters, Argent on a Saltire Gules a Lymphad sails furled Or a Chief Ermine (Fitz-Maurice); 2nd grandquarter, quarterly: 1st and 4th, Gules three Cinquefoils Ermine (Hamilton); 2nd, Argent a Lymphad sails furled Sable (Arran); 3rd, Argent a Heart Gules imperially crowned Or on a Chief Azure three Mullets of the first (Douglas); over all at the fess point an Escallop Or for difference (for Lord George Hamilton, 1st Earl of Orkney); 3rd grandquarter, quarterly: 1st and 4th, Gules three Lions passant guardant per pale Or and Argent (O'Brien); 2nd, Argent three Piles meeting in the point issuing from the chief Gules; 3rd, Argent a Pheon Azure. Supporters On the dexter side an Antelope Azure armed and ducally gorged with Chain reflexed across the back Or, and on the sinister a Stag proper attired and ducally gorged with a Chain reflexed over the back also Or, each supporter charged on the shoulder with a Cinquefoil Ermine. Motto Through Courage.

== Family tree ==
Orkney Family Tree: Earls of Orkney

William Hamilton; 1634–1694; Earl of Selkirk	Anne Hamilton; 1632–1717; Duchess of Hamilton suo jure
Earl of Orkney (3rd creation), Viscount Kirkwall, and Baron Dechmont, 1696
George Hamilton; 1666–1737; 1st Earl of Orkney, etc.
Anne O'Brien d. 1756; 2nd Countess of Orkney, etc.
Mary O'Brien c. 1721–1790; 3rd Countess of Orkney, etc.
Mary FitzMaurice; 1755–1831; 4th Countess of Orkney, etc.
John FitzMaurice; 1778–1820 styled Viscount Kirkwall
Thomas FitzMaurice; 1803–1877; 5th Earl of Orkney, etc.
George William Hamilton FitzMaurice; 1827–1889; 6th Earl of Orkney, etc.	Henry Warrender FitzMaurice; 1828–1875	Frederick O'Bryen FitzMaurice; 1830–1867	James Terence FitzMaurice; 1835–1917
Edmond FitzMaurice; 1867–1951; 7th Earl of Orkney, etc.	Douglas FitzMaurice; 1861–1932	Isabella FitzMaurice d. 1948
Douglas FitzMaurice; 1890–1937	Frederick St. John; 1886–1977
Cecil O'Bryen FitzMaurice; 1919–1998; 8th Earl of Orkney, etc.	Oliver Peter St John b. 1938; 9th Earl of etc.
Oliver Robert St John b. 1969 styled Viscount Kirkwall; Heir apparent

== See also ==
- Mormaer of Caithness
- Viscount St John
