= Fitzmorris =

FITZMORRIS

Origin
- Meaning: "Son of Morris"
- Region of origin: Ireland

Other names
- Variant forms: Morris; Fitzmaurice

Fitzmorris is an Irish Hiberno-Norman surname originating in Counties Kerry, Galway, and Mayo. It is patronymic as the prefix Fitz- derives from the Latin filius, meaning "son of". Its variants include FitzMorris, Fitz Morris, Fitz-Morris, fitz Morris; alternate spellings Fitzmaurice, Fitzmoris, Fitzmorys; and the given-name-turned-surname Morris. Fitzmorris is uncommon as a given name.

== People ==
People with the name Fitzmorris include:

- Al Fitzmorris (1946–2024), American professional baseball player
- James Fitz-Morris (1897–1918), British World War I flying ace
- Jimmy Fitzmorris (1921–2021), American politician
- Tom Fitzmorris (1951–2025), American radio host and author, New Orleans food critic

== See also ==
- Fitzmaurice
- Morris
