= Jon Haraldsson =

Earl of Orkney (13th century)

Jon Haraldsson was a Norwegian noble who served as the Jarl of Orkney between 1206 and 1231. Jon Haraldsson and his brother David were the sons of Harald Maddadsson with his second wife Hvarflod, daughter of Earl Máel Coluim of Moray. Jon and David were joint Earls of Orkney after the death of their father in 1206. David Haraldsson died of sickness in 1214, leaving Jon Haraldsson to rule alone. William the Lion, king of Scotland, took Jon's daughter hostage in August 1214 as part of a peace agreement with the new sole Earl.

In 1222, Jon Haraldsson was implicated, indirectly, in the burning of Adam, the Bishop of Caithness, in his hall at Halkirk by local farmers. At this time, Caithness was part of the Jarldom of Orkney, within the Kingdom of Norway. When the farmers had complained to the Jarl about the Bishop's increase in the butter tithe, Jon had been disinterested in their concerns, but being annoyed by the Bishop for other reasons, he declared:

The devil take the bishop and his butter; you may roast him if you please!.

A contemporary chronicler, Boethius the Dane, blamed Jon for the Adam's death. Nevertheless, Jon swore oaths to his own innocence, and was pardoned. It was, though, King Alexander II of Scotland who undertook reprisals against the farmers for the killing; the Jarl was restrained in his ability to object to Alexander's interference, when Pope Honorius III declared his satisfaction at the reprisals.

Snaekoll Gunnisson, a great-grandson of Rognvald Kali, demanded that Jon Haraldsson should share the Earldom with him. The supporters of Jon and Snaekoll fought a war until it was agreed that King Haakon IV of Norway should settle the matter. All concerned set off to Norway, but a ship carrying Jon Haraldsson, his supporters and his kin, was lost at sea on the return voyage during 1231.. An alternative version of Earl John's demise is that he was resident in Thurso, and had his hall burnt around him. He escaped to a cellar only to be mortally wounded by Hanef, quaestor to the King of Norway, with nine wounds.

The Norse line of Earls had dated from the time of Harald Fairhair. With the death of Jon Haraldsson, it became extinct. In 1236, King Haakon IV chose Magnus (Magnus mac Gille-Críst of Angus), the son of Gille Críst, Mormaer of Angus, as Jon's successor, forming the basis for a new ethnic leadership.

== Sources ==
- Anderson, Alan Orr Early Sources of Scottish History: AD 500-1286 2 Vols, (Edinburgh, 1922)
- Hudson, Benjamin T. Kings of Celtic Scotland (Westport, 1994)
- Morris, Christopher Viking Orkney: A Survey ( The Prehistory of Orkney. Ed. Colin Renfrew. Edinburgh: Edinburgh University Press. 1985)
- Pálsson, Hermann and Paul Edwards, tr. Orkneyinga Saga: The History of the Earls of Orkney (Penguin, London, 1978)
- Scott, W.W. 'William I [known as William the Lion] (c.1142–1214), king of Scots.' Oxford Dictionary of National Biography. doi:10.1093/ref:odnb/29452. Accessed 19 August 2014
