= Thomas FitzMaurice, 5th Earl of Orkney =

Scottish aristocrat

The Right Honourable The Earl of Orkney
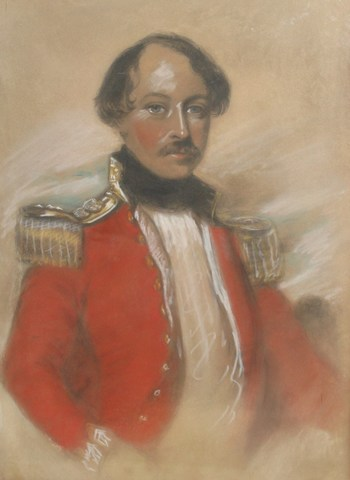
- Portrait of Lord Orkney

Representative Peer for Scotland
- In office 14 January 1833 – 26 January 1874

Personal details
- Born: Thomas John Hamilton FitzMaurice; 8 August 1803
- Died: 16 May 1877 (aged 73)
- Spouse: Hon. Charlotte Irby (after 1826)
- Relations: William FitzMaurice (brother)
- Children: 8
- Parent(s): John FitzMaurice, Viscount Kirkwall; Hon. Anna Maria Blaquiere

Thomas John Hamilton FitzMaurice, 5th Earl of Orkney (8 August 1803 – 16 May 1877) was a Scottish aristocrat.

== Early life ==
FitzMaurice was the son of John FitzMaurice, Viscount Kirkwall and the former Hon. Anna Maria Blaquiere. Among his siblings were William FitzMaurice, MP for Buckinghamshire. His father served as MP for Heytesbury and Denbigh Boroughs.

His paternal grandparents were Mary FitzMaurice, 4th Countess of Orkney and Thomas Fitzmaurice, MP for Calne and Wycombe (who was a younger son of John Petty, 1st Earl of Shelburne). His maternal grandparents were the former Eleanor Dobson and John Blaquiere, 1st Baron de Blaquiere, the Chief Secretary for Ireland. His great-uncle was British Prime Minister under George III, William Petty-FitzMaurice, 1st Marquess of Lansdowne, who succeeded in securing peace and ending the American War of Independence.

== Career ==
On 30 December 1831, he succeeded his grandmother Mary as Earl of Orkney.

From 14 January 1833 to 26 January 1874, he served as a Representative Peer for Scotland.

He served in the Yeomanry Cavalry.

== Personal life ==
On 14 March 1826, he married the Hon. Charlotte Irby, daughter of George Irby, 3rd Baron Boston and Rachel Ives Drake. Together, they were the parents of:

- George William Hamilton FitzMaurice, 6th Earl of Orkney (1827–1889), who married Amelia Samuel, daughter of Samuel Moses Samuel, in 1872.
- Hon. Henry Warrender FitzMaurice (1828–1875), who married Sarah Jane Roose, daughter of George Bradley Roose, in 1861.
- Hon. Frederick O'Bryen FitzMaurice (1830–1867), who married Mary Anne Taylor Abraham, daughter of Robert Taylor Spooner Abraham, in 1853.
- Lady Isabella Emma Elizabeth FitzMaurice (1832–1906), who married Samuel Leo Schuster, son of Leo Schuster, in 1858. After his death in 1884, she married Lt.-Gen. Hon. Hussey Fane Keane, son of Lt.-Gen. John Keane, 1st Baron Keane, in 1886.
- Hon. Alexander Temple FitzMaurice (1834–1894), who became a Groom of the Bedchamber to the Prince of Wales in 1867; he married Adela Mary Scrope, daughter of Simon Thomas Scrope, in 1873.
- Hon. James Terence FitzMaurice (1835–1917), who married Frances Rhoda Ouseley, daughter of Sir William Gore Ouseley, in 1861. After her death in 1907, he married Eleanor Palairet, daughter of Capt. Septimus Henry Palairet and sister to Henry Palaire, in 1911.
- Lady Emily Charlotte FitzMaurice (1836–1910)
- Lady Maria Louisa FitzMaurice (1837–1917), who married Edmund Robert Spearman, son of Sir Alexander Young Spearman, 1st Baronet, in 1859.

Lord Orkney died on 16 May 1877. He is interred in Latteragh graveyard in County Tipperary, Ireland. He was succeeded in his titles by his eldest son, George.

=== Descendants ===
Through his daughter Lady Maria, he was the great-grandfather of Sir Christopher Bullock who was Permanent Under-Secretary for the British Air Ministry.

Peerage of Scotland
Preceded by Mary FitzMaurice	Earl of Orkney; 1831–1877	Succeeded by George FitzMaurice
