= Magnus Magnusson, Earl of Orkney =

Earl of Orkney from 1273 to 1284

Magnus Magnusson was Earl of Orkney from 1273 to 1284. In 1284 he joined with other Scottish noblemen who acknowledged Margaret of Norway as the heir of Alexander.

Born circa 1235 in the Orkney islands in Scotland. Died circa 1284 around the age of 50.
