= Cecil FitzMaurice, 8th Earl of Orkney =

Cecil O'Bryen Fitz-Maurice, 8th Earl of Orkney (3 July 1919 – 5 February 1998) was a Scottish peer. He held the subsidiary titles of Viscount of Kirkwall and Baron of Dechmont.

Born in 1919, Fitz-Maurice was the younger son of Captain Douglas Frederick Harold FitzMaurice RNAS (died 1937), a great-grandson of the 5th Earl, by his marriage to Dorothy Janette, daughter of Captain Robert Dickie, RN. His elder brother Douglas Hubert Hamilton FitzMaurice (1916–1942) was killed in action during the Second World War.

He joined the Royal Army Service Corps on the outbreak of the Second World War in 1939 and served in North Africa, Italy, France and Germany. He later served in the Korean War from 1950 to 1951. In 1951, he inherited the Earldom of Orkney from a cousin, Edmond Walter FitzMaurice, 7th Earl of Orkney (1867–1951).

In 1953, the new Lord Orkney married Rose Katharine Durk, the younger daughter of J. W. D. Silley, of Brixham, but they had no children. He died in 1998 and was succeeded by his kinsman Oliver Peter St John.

With the granting of seats in the House of Lords to all Scottish peers, which took effect in August 1963, Orkney gained a seat in the Lords, which was then expected to be for life. He did not live to see the enactment of the House of Lords Act 1999 which would have cost him his seat, removing most hereditary peers.

At the time of his death, Orkney was living in Princes Road, Ferndown, Dorset.

== Notes ==
Peerage of Scotland
Preceded by Edmond FitzMaurice	Earl of Orkney; 1951–1998	Succeeded by Peter St John
