= Scandinavian Scotland =

8th- to 15th-century historical period

Scandinavian Scotland was the period from the 8th to the 15th centuries during which Vikings and Norse settlers, mainly Norwegians and to a lesser extent other Scandinavians, and their descendants colonised parts of what is now the periphery of modern Scotland. Viking influence in the area commenced in the late 8th century, and hostility between the Scandinavian earls of Orkney and the emerging thalassocracy of the Kingdom of the Isles, the rulers of Ireland, Dál Riata and Alba, and intervention by the crown of Norway were recurring themes.

Scandinavian-held territories included the Northern Isles of Orkney and Shetland, the Hebrides, the islands of the Firth of Clyde and associated mainland territories including Caithness and Sutherland. The historical record from Scottish sources is weak, with the Irish annals and the later Norse sagas, of which the Orkneyinga saga is the principal source of information, sometimes contradictory although modern archaeology is beginning to provide a broader picture of life during this period.

There are various competing theories that have addressed the early colonisation process, although it is clear that the Northern Isles were the first to be conquered by Vikings and the last to be relinquished by the Norwegian crown. Thorfinn Sigurdsson's rule in the 11th century included expansion well into north mainland Scotland and this may have been the zenith of Scandinavian influence. The obliteration of pre-Norse names in the Hebrides and Northern Isles, and their replacement with Norse ones was almost total although the emergence of alliances with the native Gaelic speakers produced a powerful Norse–Gael culture that had wide influence in Argyll, Galloway and beyond.

Scottish influence increased from the 13th century on. In 1231, an unbroken line of Norse earls of Orkney ended and the title was since held by Scottish nobles. An ill-fated expedition by Haakon Haakonarson later in that century led to the relinquishing of the islands of the west to the Scottish Crown and in the mid-15th century Orkney and Shetland were also transferred to Scottish rule. The negative view of Viking activities held in popular imagination notwithstanding, Norse expansion may have been a factor in the emergence of the Gaelic kingdom of Alba, the forerunner of modern Scotland, and the trading, political, cultural and religious achievements of the later periods of Norse rule were significant.

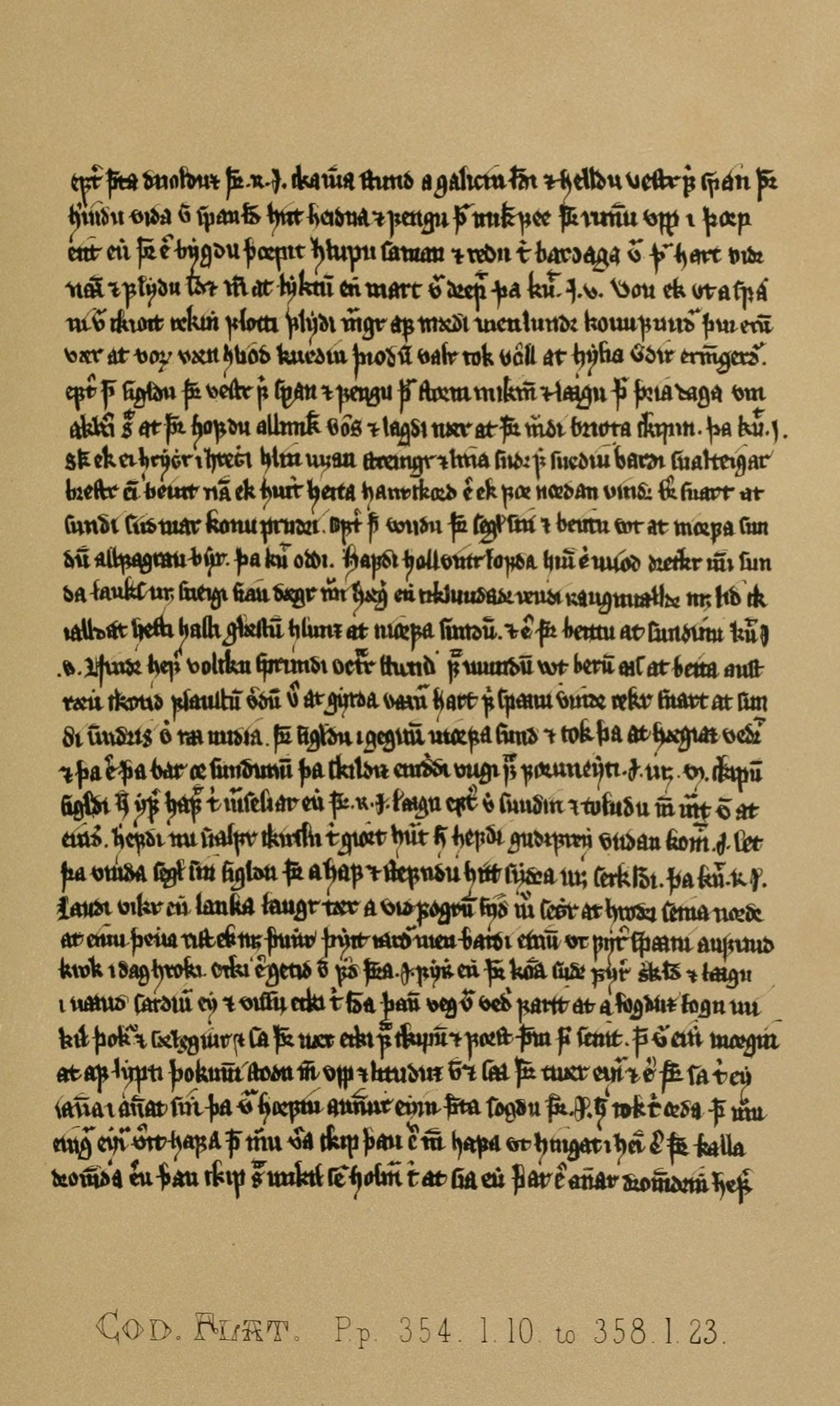
An example of a page from the Orkneyinga saga, as it appears in the 14th-century Flateyjarbók

== Geography ==
The Northern Isles, known to the Norse as the Norðreyjar, are the closest parts of Scotland to Norway and these islands experienced the first and most long-lasting Norse influence of any part of Scotland. Shetland is some 300 kilometres (190 mi) due west of Norway and in favourable conditions could be reached in 24 hours from Hordaland in a Viking longship. Orkney is 80 kilometres (50 mi) further to the south-west.

Some 16 kilometres (10 mi) due south of Orkney is the Scottish mainland. The two most northerly provinces of mainland Scotland, Caithness and Sutherland, fell under Norse control at an early date. South of there the entire western seaboard of mainland Scotland from Wester Ross to Kintyre was also subject to significant Scandinavian influence.

The Suðreyjar, or "Southern Isles" include:

- The Hebrides or Western Isles comprising: (Note: Murray (1973) notes that "Western Isles" has tended to mean "Outer Hebrides" since the creation of the Na h-Eileanan an Iar (or Western Isles) parliamentary constituency in 1918. The phrase can also be used to refer to the Hebrides in general, which is the usage here throughout.)
  - The Outer Hebrides, aka the "Long Island" to the west, separated from the northern Inner Hebrides by the waters of the Minch. These islands are some 180 kilometres (110 mi) west of Orkney.
  - The Inner Hebrides including Skye, Islay, Jura, Mull and Iona.
- The islands of the Firth of Clyde some 140 kilometres (87 mi) to the south, the largest of which are Bute and Arran.
- The Isle of Man, located in the Irish Sea equidistantly from modern England, Ireland, Scotland and Wales

The total distance from the southern tip of the Isle of Man to the Butt of Lewis, the northern extremity of the Outer Hebrides, is approximately 515 kilometres (320 mi). This entire region became dominated by Norse culture for much of the period under consideration. For example, it is likely that the Norse language became as dominant throughout the Inner Hebrides as it did on Lewis during the 10th and 11th centuries.

There was also significant direct Norse influence exerted in Galloway in south-west Scotland and for much of the period, up until the 1266 Treaty of Perth, Norwegian and Danish foreign policy and the activities of independent or semi-independent Norse rulers of the above parts of Scandinavian-dominated Scotland had a powerful influence on the affairs of Scotland as a whole.

== History ==
Contemporary documentation of the Viking period of Scottish history is very weak. The presence of the monastery on Iona led to this part of Scotland being relatively well recorded from the mid-6th to the mid-9th century. But from 849 on, when Columba's relics were removed in the face of Viking incursions, written evidence from local sources all but vanishes for three hundred years. The sources for information about the Hebrides and much of northern Scotland from the 8th to the 11th century are thus almost exclusively Irish, English or Norse. The main Norse text is the Orkneyinga Saga, which was written in the early 13th century by an unknown Icelander. The English and Irish sources are more contemporary, but may have "led to a southern bias in the story", especially as much of the Hebridean archipelago became Norse-speaking during this period. Dates should therefore be regarded as approximate throughout.

The archaeological record for this period is relatively scant, although improving. Toponymy provides significant information about the Scandinavian presence and examples of Norse runes provide further useful evidence. There is a significant corpus of material from the Gaelic oral tradition that relates to this period, but its value is questionable.

Language and personal names provide some difficulties. The former is an important indicator of culture but there is very little direct evidence for its use in specific circumstances during the period under consideration. Pictish, Middle Irish and Old Norse would certainly have been spoken and Woolf (2007) suggests that a significant degree of linguistic balkanisation took place. As a result, single individuals often appear in sources under a variety of different names.

=== Colonisation process ===
Given what is known about the frequency of sea transport around the Hebrides and Orkney in the 7th century it is highly likely that Gaelic and Pictish sailors were aware of Scandinavia before the commencement of the Viking Age. It has also been suggested that an assault by forces from Fortriu in 681 in which Orkney was "annihilated" may have led to a weakening of the local power base and helped the Norse come to prominence. Scholarly interpretations of the period "have led to widely divergent reconstructions of Viking Age Scotland" especially in the early period and Barrett (2008) has identified four competing theories, none of which he regards as proven.

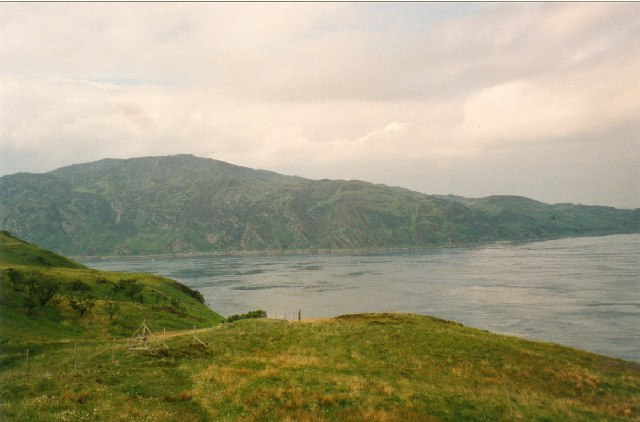
The Gulf of Corryvreckan between Jura and Scarba. According to tradition "Prince Breacan of Lochlann" was shipwrecked there with a fleet of fifty ships.

The traditional explanation is the earldom hypothesis. This assumes a period of Norse expansion into the Northern Isles and the creation of an aristocratic dynasty that lasted well into the Medieval period, which exerted considerable influence in western Scotland and Mann into the 11th century. This version of events is essentially as told by the Norse sagas and is supported by some archaeological evidence although it has been criticised for exaggerating Orcadian influence in the Suðreyar.

The second of these theories is the genocide hypothesis, which asserts that the aboriginal populations of the Northern and Western Isles were eradicated and replaced wholesale with settlers of Scandinavian stock. The strength of this argument is the almost total replacement of pre-existing place names by those of Norse origin throughout much of the region. Its weakness is that the place name evidence is from a relatively late date and the nature of this transition remains controversial. Genetic studies show that Shetlanders have almost identical proportions of Scandinavian matrilineal and patrilineal ancestry, suggesting that the islands were settled by both men and women in equal measure. (Note: This contrasts with evidence from the Faroes, for which it has been calculated that 87% or more of the males settlers were of Scandinavian descent but that 83% of females were from the British Isles and only 17% from Scandinavia.)

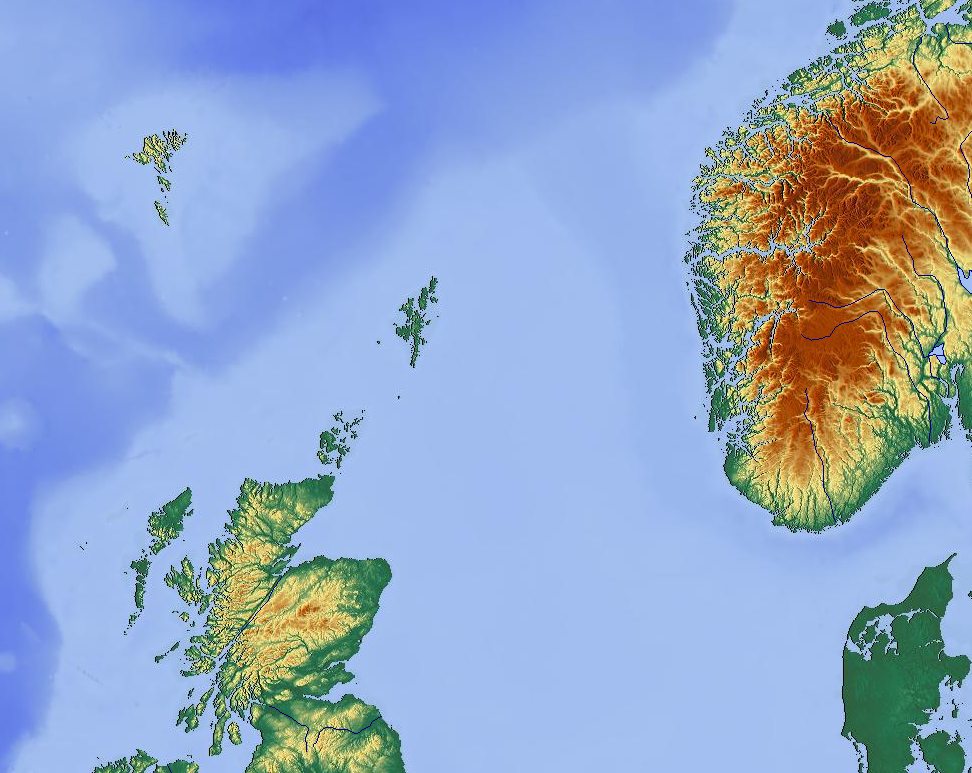
The Scottish islands in relation to nearby territories and states

The pagan reaction hypothesis proposed by Bjørn Myhre suggests a long tradition of mobility amongst the various populations of the North Atlantic seaboard and that the expansion of Christian missions resulted in ethnic tensions that led to or exacerbated Viking expansion. There is some evidence of such mobility, such as Irish missionary activities in Iceland and Faroe Islands in the 8th century, but little that is conclusive.

The fourth suggestion is the Laithlind or Lochlann hypothesis. This word appears in various forms in the early Irish literature and is usually assumed to refer to Norway itself, although some have preferred to locate it in the Norse-dominated parts of Scotland. Donnchadh Ó Corráin is a proponent of this view and claims that a substantial part of Scotland—the Northern and Western Isles and large areas of the coastal mainland—were conquered by the Vikings in the first quarter of the 9th century and that a Viking kingdom was set up there earlier than the middle of the century. Essentially a variant of the earldom hypothesis, there is little archaeological evidence in its favour, although it is clear that extensive Viking incursions on the Irish coasts were supported by a presence of some kind in the Hebrides, even if the date the latter became prominent is far from certain. (Note: Barret (2008) suggest a "late, mid-ninth-century" date for Viking settlement and raids "launched from bases in Atlantic Scotland" but notes a variety of other options suggested by scholars.) As Ó Corráin himself admits "when and how the Vikings conquered and occupied the Isles is unknown, perhaps unknowable".

=== Early Viking incursions ===
Norse contacts with Scotland certainly predate the first written records in the 8th century, although their nature and frequency are unknown. Excavations at Norwick on the island of Unst in Shetland indicate that Scandinavian settlers had reached there, perhaps as early as the mid-7th century, consistent with dates produced for Viking levels at Old Scatness.

From 793 onwards repeated raids by Vikings on the British Isles are recorded. "All the islands of Britain" were devastated in 794 with Iona being sacked in 802 and 806. (These attacks on Christian settlements in the islands of the west were not new. In the 6th century Tiree was raided by Pictish forces, Tory Island was attacked in the early 7th century by a "marine fleet" and Donnán of Eigg and 52 companions were murdered by Picts on Eigg in 617.) (Note: Ó Corráin writes of an incident of Viking activity in Ireland "This was a perfectly normal military campaign in Irish circumstances and the plundering of churches was an integral part of warfare and not a new vice learned with alacrity from the Vikings.") Various named Viking leaders, who were probably based in Scotland, appear in the Irish annals: Soxulfr in 837, Turges in 845 and Hákon in 847. The king of Fortriu Eógan mac Óengusa and the king of Dál Riata Áed mac Boanta were among the dead in a major defeat to the Vikings in 839. Another early reference to the Norse presence in the Irish records is that there was a king of "Viking Scotland" whose heir, Thórir, brought an army to Ireland in 848. Caittil Find was a reported leader of the Gallgáedil fighting in Ireland in 857.

The Frankish Annales Bertiniani may record the conquest of the Inner Hebrides by Vikings in 847. Amlaíb Conung, who died in 874, is described as the "son of the king of Lochlainn" in the Fragmentary Annals of Ireland also suggesting an early date for an organised kingdom of Viking Scotland. In the same source Amlaíb is also recorded as having gone to the aid of his father Gofraidh who was under assault from Vikings in Lochlainn, c. 872. Gofraidh died in 873 and may have been succeeded by his son Ímar who also died that year. A lament for Áed mac Cináeda, a Pictish king who died in 878, suggests Kintyre may have been lost to his kingdom at that time. The Isle of Man may also have been taken by the Norse in 877 and was certainly held by them by 900.

== Subdivisions ==
=== Norðreyjar ===
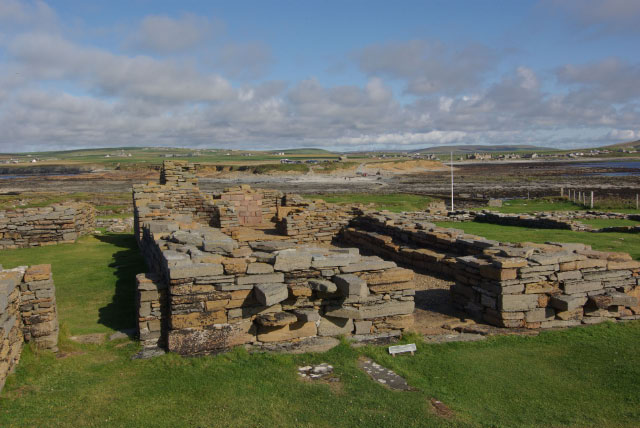
Brough of Birsay

The Northern Isles were "Pictish in culture and speech" prior to the Norse incursions, and although it is recorded that Orkney was "destroyed" by King Bridei in 682 it is not likely that the Pictish kings exerted a significant degree of ongoing control over island affairs. According to the Orkneyinga Saga, about 872 Harald Fairhair became King of a united Norway and many of his opponents fled to the islands of Scotland. Harald pursued his enemies and incorporated the Northern Isles into his kingdom in 875 and then, perhaps a little over a decade later, the Hebrides as well. The following year the local Viking chieftains of the Hebrides rebelled. Harald then sent Ketill Flatnose to subdue them. Ketill achieved this quickly but then declared himself an independent "King of the Isles", a title he retained for the rest of his life. Hunter (2000) states that Ketill was "in charge of an extensive island realm and, as a result, sufficiently prestigious to contemplate the making of agreements and alliances with other princelings". (Note: Ketill Flatnose is also sometimes equated with Caittil Find although this connection is far from definite. The Ketill/Caittil relationship is described by Woolf (2007) as "extremely tenuous" although in an earlier publication he appears to support this identification.) According to the Landnámabók Kettil became ruler of a region already settled by Scandinavians. Some scholars believe that this entire story is apocryphal and based on the later voyages of Magnus Barelegs. For example, Woolf (2007) suggests that his appearance in the sagas "looks very much like a story created in later days to legitimise Norwegian claims to sovereignty in the region" and suggests an early-11th-century creation of the earldom of Orkney, prior to which local warlords competed for influence with one another and local populations of farmers.

Nonetheless, the Norse tradition states that Rognvald Eysteinsson received Orkney and Shetland from Harald as an earldom as reparation for the death of his son in battle in Scotland, and then passed the earldom on to his brother Sigurd the Mighty. Sigurd's line barely survived him and it was Torf-Einarr, Rognvald's son by a slave, who founded a dynasty that controlled the Northern Isles for centuries after his death. (Note: Sigurd the Mighty's son Gurthorm ruled for a single winter after Sigurd's death and died childless. Rognvald's son Hallad inherited the title but, unable to constrain Danish raids on Orkney, he gave up the earldom and returned to Norway, which according to the Orkneyinga saga, "everyone thought was a huge joke.") He was succeeded by his son Thorfinn Turf-Einarsson and during this time the deposed Norwegian king Eric Bloodaxe often used Orkney as a raiding base before being killed in 954. Thorfinn's death and presumed burial at the broch of Hoxa, on South Ronaldsay, then led to a long period of dynastic strife. Whatever the historical details, it seems likely that Orkney and Shetland were being rapidly absorbed into Norse culture by this time. (Note: The nature and timing of the Pictish-Norse transition is poorly understood. Marwick (1952) believed that the evidence of Orcadian farm names suggested an even earlier Norse settlement pattern, prior to 900, although later research is more equivocal. Woolf (2007) suggests the later creation of the Earldom of Orkney during the time of Harald Bluetooth circa 980.)

The evidence of toponymy and language is unequivocal. Placenames in Orkney with a Celtic derivation are few in number and it is clear that Norn, a local version of Old Norse, was widely spoken by the inhabitants into historic times. Norn was also spoken in Shetland and evidence for Pictish elements in placenames is virtually non-existent, the three island names of Fetlar, Unst and Yell excepted.

Jarlshof in Shetland contains the most extensive remains of a Viking site visible anywhere in Britain and it is believed that the Norse inhabited the site continuously from the 9th to the 14th centuries. Amongst the many important finds are drawings scratched on slate of dragon-prowed ships and a bronze-gilt harness mounting made in Ireland in the 8th or 9th centuries. Brough of Birsay in Orkney is another important archaeological site, which like Jarlshof has a continuity of settlement spanning the Pictish and Norse periods. There is a remarkable collection of 12th-century runic inscriptions inside Maeshowe.

=== Caithness and Sutherland ===
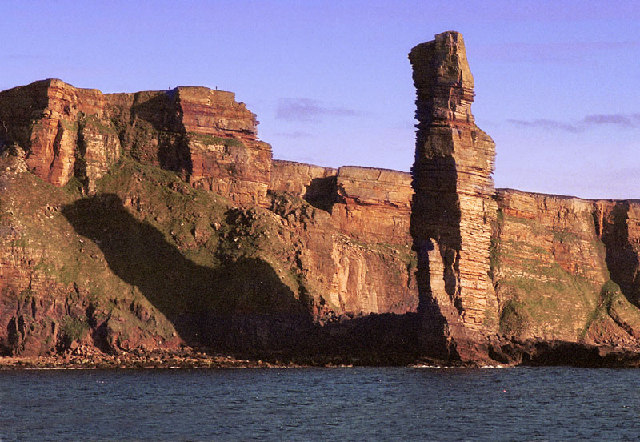
The Old Man of Hoy, a prominent landmark on the sea journey from Stromness on Mainland Orkney to Caithness

In early Irish literature Shetland is referred to as Inse Catt—"the Isles of Cats", which may have been the pre-Norse inhabitants' name for these islands. The Cat tribe certainly occupied parts of the northern Scottish mainland and their name can be found in Caithness, and in the Gaelic name for Sutherland (Cataibh, meaning "among the Cats"). There is limited evidence that Caithness may have had an intermediate phase of Gaelic-speaking control between the Pictish era and the Norse takeover, but if it existed it is likely to have been short-lived.

Sigurd Eysteinsson and Thorstein the Red moved on northern Scotland, conquering large areas variously described in the sagas as constituting all of Caithness and Sutherland and possibly including territory in Ross and even Moray during the last decade of the 9th century. The Orkneyinga Saga relates how the former defeated the Pict Máel Brigte Tusk but died from an unusual post-battle injury.

Thorfinn Torf-Einarsson married into the native aristocracy and his son, Skuli Thorfinnsson, is recorded as having sought the support of the King of Scots in the 10th century in pursuing his claim as mormaer of Caithness. Njáls saga relates that Sigurd the Stout was the ruler of "Ross and Moray, Sutherland and the Dales" of Caithness and it is possible that in the late 10th century the Scots kings were in alliance with the Earl of Orkney against the Mormaer of Moray.

Thorfinn Sigurdsson expanded his father's realm south beyond Sutherland and by the 11th century the Norwegian crown had come to accept that Caithness was held by the earls of Orkney as a fiefdom from the Kings of Scotland although its Norse character was retained throughout the 13th century. Raghnall mac Gofraidh was granted Caithness after assisting the Scots king in a conflict with Harald Maddadson, an earl of Orkney in the early 13th century. (Note: Although the Orkneyinga Saga states that this story is about Raghnall mac Gofraidh it also relates that Ingibjörg Hákonardóttir, the daughter of Earl Hakon Paulsson was his mother. In fact she was the wife of his grandfather King Olaf Godredsson. Roger of Howden's record of these events states that King William actually sought and received the help of Raghnall mac Gofraidh's cousin Raghnall mac Somhairle. Williams (2007) suggests that "with regard to Hebridean involvement in Caithness, however, it really does not matter which Rögnvaldr was involved, so long as he was the grandson of Ingibjörg". McDonald (2007) refutes the latter interpretation based on an analysis of Roger of Howden's text by A.A.M. Duncan.) This joint earldom ceased after 1375 and the Pentland Firth became the border between Scotland and Norway.

No Norse place names have been found on the northern Scottish mainland south of Beauly and so far no archaeological evidence of Norse activity has been found in the north-west mainland.

=== Suðreyjar ===
Norse Scottish island possessions in the 12th century.

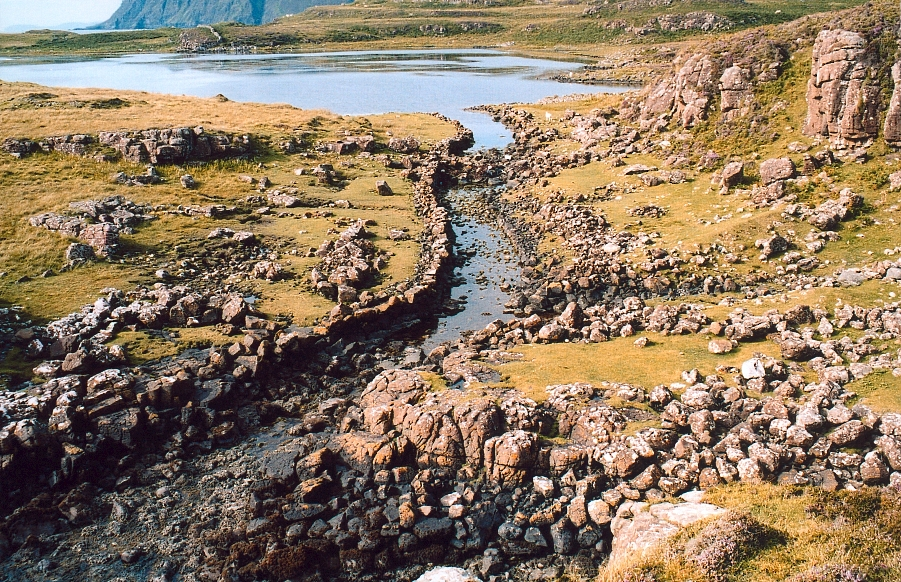
The "Viking Canal" leaving Loch na h-Airde, Rubha an Dùnain

Like the Northern Isles, the Outer Hebrides and the northern Inner Hebrides were predominantly Pictish in the early 9th century. By contrast, the southern Inner Hebrides formed part of the Gaelic kingdom of Dál Riata.

The obliteration of pre-Norse names in the Outer Hebrides and in Coll, Tiree and Islay in the Inner Hebrides is almost total and there is little continuity of style between Pictish pottery in the north and that of the Viking period. The similarities that do exist suggests the later pots may have been made by Norse who had settled in Ireland, or Irish slaves. There are frequent references in early Icelandic history to slaves from Ireland and the Hebrides, but none from Orkney. Gaelic certainly continued to exist as a spoken language in the southern Hebrides throughout the settlement period, but place name evidence suggests it had a lowly status and Norse may have survived as a spoken language until the 16th century in the Outer Hebrides.

There is no evidence of any direct Norwegian rule in the area other than a few brief occupations although the written record is weak and no contemporary records of the Norse period from the Outer Hebrides exist. It is, however, known that Hebrides were taxed using the Ounceland system and evidence from Bornais suggests that settlers there may have been more prosperous than families of a similar status in the Northern Isles, possibly due to a more relaxed political regime. Latterly, the Hebrides sent eight representatives from Lewis and Harris and Skye and another eight from the southern Hebrides to the Tynwald parliament on Man.

Colonsay and Oronsay have produced important pagan Norse burial grounds. An 11th-century cross slab decorated with Irish and Ringerike Viking art on Islay was found in 1838. Rubha an Dùnain, today an uninhabited peninsula to the south of the Cuillin hills on Skye, contains the small Loch na h-Airde, which is connected to the sea by a short artificial canal. This loch was an important site for maritime activity for many centuries, spanning the Viking and later periods of Scottish clan rule. There is a stone-built quay and a system to maintain constant water levels. Boat timbers discovered there have been dated to the 12th century. Only three rune stones are known from the west coast of Scotland, on Christian memorials found on Barra, Inchmarnock and Iona.

In the Firth of Clyde, Norse burials have been found on Arran, although not Bute and place name evidence suggests a settlement pattern that was much less well-developed than in the Hebrides. On the mainland coast there is cluster of Norse place names around Largs and an ornate silver brooch was found on a hillside near Hunterston that is of likely 7th-century Irish origin but with a 10th-century runic inscription. Five Hogback monuments found in Govan hint at Scandinavian enclaves inland.

The Isle of Man (which was absorbed into Scotland from 1266 until the 14th century) was dominated by the Norse–Gaels from an early date and from 1079 onwards by the Crovan dynasty as attested by the Chronicles of Mann and evidenced by the numerous Manx runestones and Norse place names. The modern-day Diocese of Sodor and Man retains the centuries-old name.

=== Western coast ===
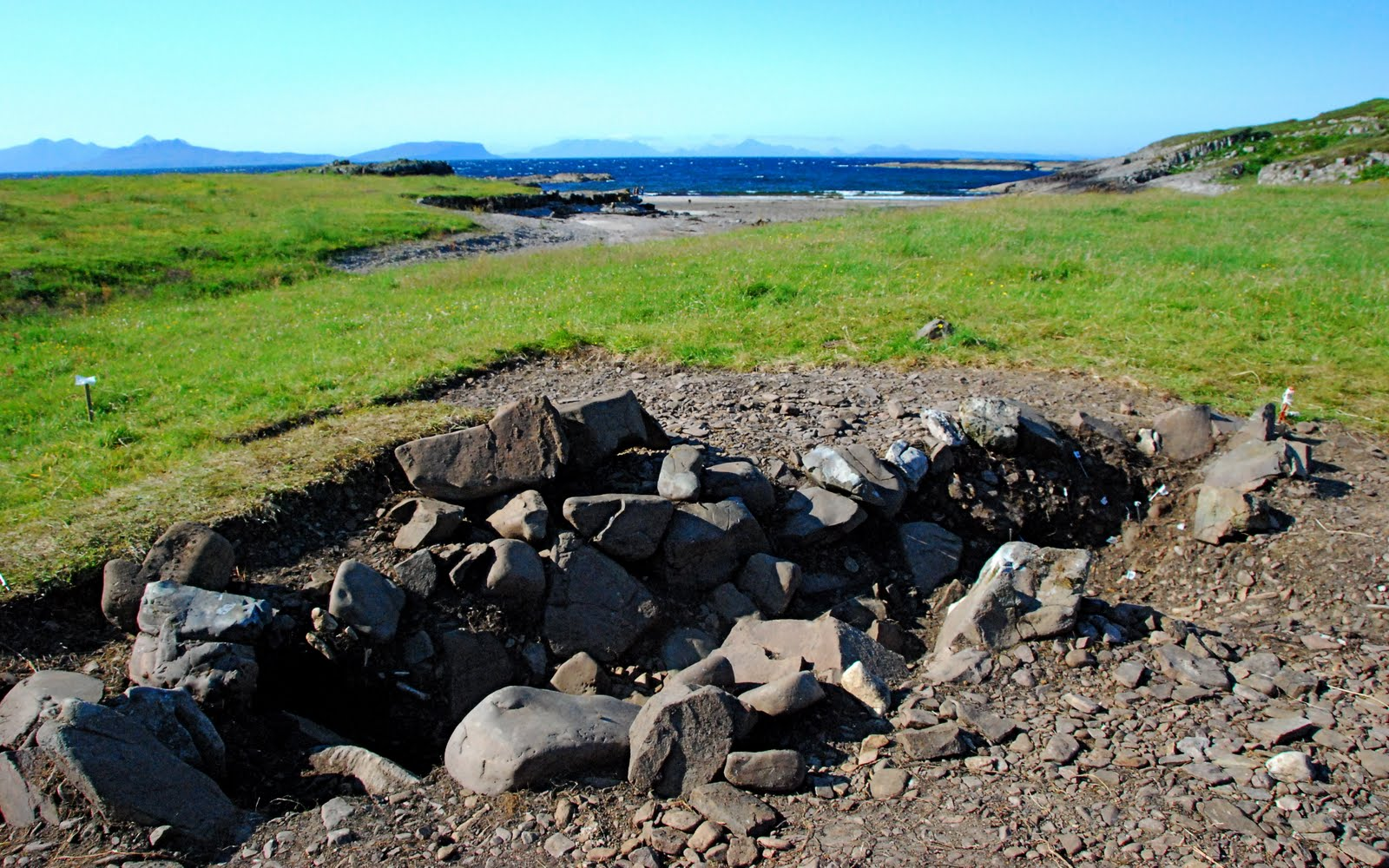
The Port an Eilean Mhòir ship burial site in Ardnamurchan, with the Small Isles and Skye in the distance

South of Sutherland there is considerable place name evidence of Norse settlement along the entire western coast, although unlike on the islands the settlement in the south seems to have been less prolonged and undertaken in tandem with pre-existing settlement rather than replacing it entirely. The distinction between the Innse Gall (islands of the foreigners) and the Airer Goidel (coastland of the Gael) is further suggestive of a distinction between island and mainland at an early date. In Wester Ross most of the Gaelic names that exist on the coastline today are of likely Medieval rather than pre-Norse origin and a now-lost charter refers to the mainland village of Glenelg opposite Skye as having been in the possession of the king of Man. As in Orkney and Shetland, Pictish seems to have been entirely replaced wherever the Norse encountered it.

In the 9th century the first references to the Gallgáedil (i.e. "foreign Gaels") appear. This term was variously used in succeeding centuries to refer to individuals of mixed Scandinavian-Celtic descent and/or culture who became dominant in west and south-west Scotland, parts of northern England and the isles. This alliance between the two cultures, which also took place in Ireland, may have been instrumental in saving the Gaels of Dál Riata from the fate of the Picts in the north and west. Evidence for Norse settlement in mainland Argyll is limited although the Port an Eilean Mhòir ship burial in Ardnamurchan is the first boat-burial site to be discovered on the mainland of Britain.

=== South-West Scotland ===
By the mid-10th century Amlaíb Cuarán controlled the Rhinns and the region gets the modern name of Galloway from the mixture of Viking and Gaelic Irish settlement that produced the Gall-Gaidel. Magnus Barelegs is said to have "subdued the people of Galloway" in the 11th century and Whithorn seems to have been a centre of Hiberno-Norse artisans who traded around the Irish Sea by the end of the first millennium. However, the place name, written and archaeological evidence of extensive Norse (as opposed to Norse–Gael) settlement in the area is not convincing.

The ounceland system seems to have become widespread down the west coast including much of Argyll and this is just as true of most of the south-west apart from land adjacent to the inner Solway Firth. In Dumfries and Galloway the place name evidence is complex and of mixed Gaelic, Norse and Danish influence, the last most likely stemming from contact with the extensive Danish holdings in northern England. One feature of the area is the number of names with a "kirk" prefix followed by a saint's name such as Kirkoswald. Interpretation of this is not certain but it is also indicative of a mixed Gaelic/Norse population.

=== Eastern Scotland ===
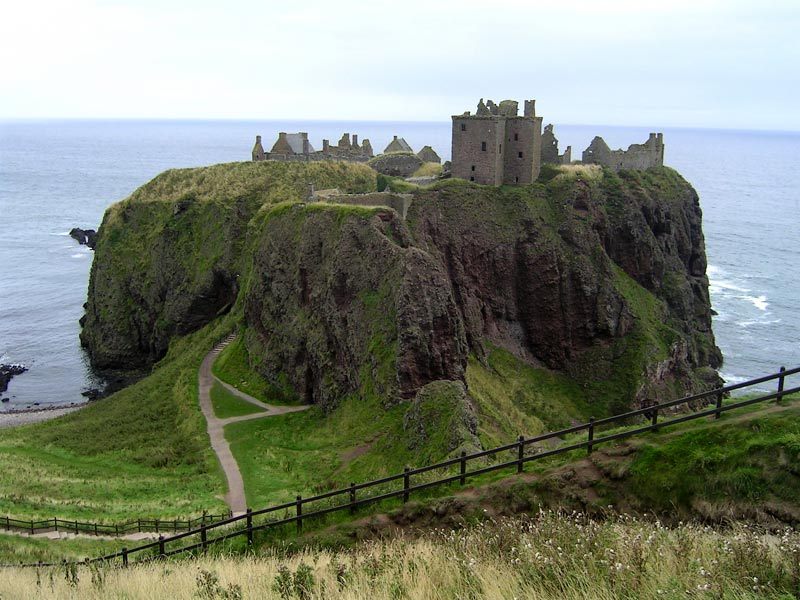
The ruins of Dunnottar Castle

There is no evidence of permanent Viking settlement on the east coast south of the Moray Firth, or of Norse burials, although raids and even invasions certainly occurred. Dunnottar was taken during the reign of Domnall mac Causantín and the Orkneyinga saga records an attack on the Isle of May, by Sweyn Asleifsson and Margad Grimsson:

They sailed south off Scotland until they came to Máeyar. There was a monastery, the head of which was an abbot, by name, Baldwin. Swein and his men were detained there seven nights by stress of bad weather. They said they had been sent by Earl Rögnvald to the King of Scots. The monks suspected their tale, and thinking they were pirates, sent to the mainland for men. When Swein and his comrades became aware of this, they went hastily aboard their ship, after having plundered much treasure from the monastery.

Place name evidence of Scandinavian settlement is very limited on the east coast and in the south-east Anglian was the predominant influence during this period of history.

== Politics and governance ==
=== Internal politics ===
The first phase of Norse expansion was that of war bands seeking plunder and the creation of new settlements. The second phase involved the integration of these settlers into organised political structures of which the most prominent in the early part were the earls of Orkney in the north and the Uí Ímair in the south.

Even if the commencement of a formal earldom of Orkney is a matter of discussion (see above) there is little doubt that the institution experienced continuity thereafter. Until the mid- to late 11th century the earls of Orkney and kings of the Western Isles were probably independent rulers. The imposition of direct Norwegian rule at the end of this century brought this to a close in the north and unusually, from c. 1100 onwards the Norse jarls of the Northern Isles owed allegiance both to Norway for Orkney and to the Scottish crown through their holdings as earls of Caithness. In 1231 the line of Norse earls, unbroken since Rognvald Eysteinsson, ended with Jon Haraldsson's murder in Thurso. The Earldom of Caithness was granted to Magnus, second son of the Earl of Angus, whom Haakon IV of Norway confirmed as Earl of Orkney in 1236. In 1379 the earldom passed to the Sinclair family, who were also barons of Roslin near Edinburgh although Orkney and Shetland remained part of Norway for a century more.

The situation in the Suðreyar was more complex. Different kings may have ruled over very different areas and few of them can be seen as exerting any kind of close control over this "far-flung sea kingdom". The Uí Ímair were certainly a powerful force from the late 9th to the early 11th centuries with dynasts such as Amlaíb Cuarán and Gofraid mac Arailt claiming kingship of the Isles. Norse sources also list various rulers such as jarls Gilli, Sigurd the Stout, Håkon Eiriksson and Thorfinn the Mighty as rulers over the Hebrides who were vassals of the Kings of Norway or Denmark. The dates from the Irish and Norse sources do not significantly overlap, but it is not clear if these are records of competing empires, or reflect Uí Ímar influence in the south and direct Norse rule in the north, or both. Furthermore, two records in the Annals of Innisfallen may suggest that the Western Isles were not "organised into a kingdom or earldom" at this time but rather that they were "ruled by assemblies of freeholders who regularly elected lawmen to preside over their public affairs". The Annals of the Four Masters entries for 962 and 974 hint at a similar arrangement. Crawford (1987) suggests that influence from the south rather than the north was "usually predominant" whilst admitting that the islands probably formed "groups of more or less independent communities".

Godred Crovan became the ruler of Dublin and Mann from 1079 and from the early years of the 12th century the Crovan dynasty asserted themselves and ruled as "Kings of Mann and the Isles" for the next half century. The kingdom was than sundered due to the actions of Somerled whose sons inherited the southern Hebrides whilst the Manx rulers held on to the "north isles" for another century. The origins of both Godred Crovan and Somerled are obscure—the former may have been an Uí Ímair dynast from Islay, the latter married a Crovan heiress.

Thus it is clear that although there were competing factions in play, the Hebrides and islands of the Clyde were essentially under the control of rulers of Scandinavian origin from "at least the late tenth century" until the emergence of the kingdom of Scotland and its 13th-century expansion into the west.

=== Relations with Pictland, Strathclyde and Alba ===
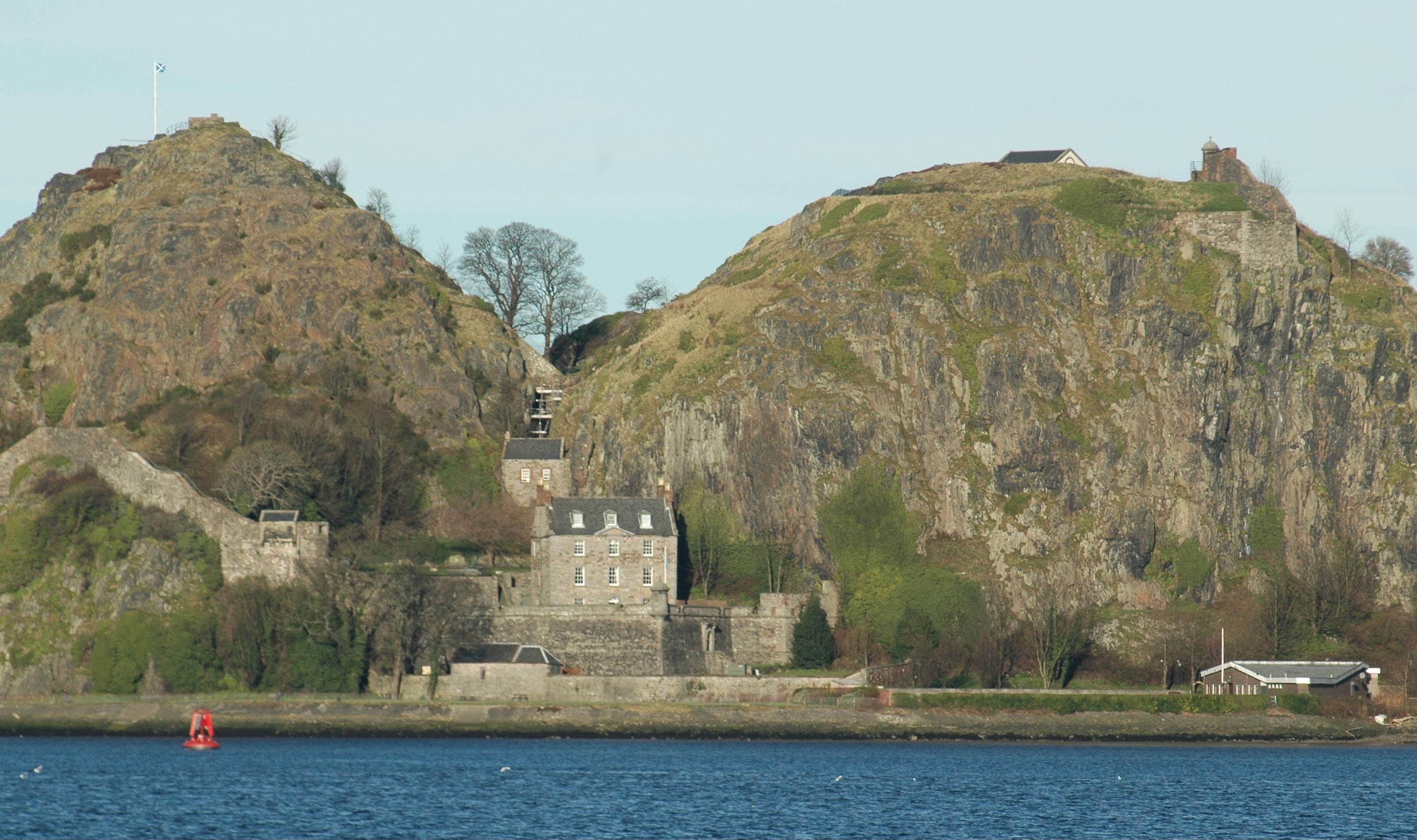
Modern Dumbarton Castle, the site of the 9th-century siege by the Uí Ímair.

The early Viking threats may have speeded a long term process of gaelicisation of the Pictish kingdoms, which adopted Gaelic language and customs. There was a merger of the Gaelic and Pictish crowns, although historians continue to debate whether it was a Pictish takeover of Dál Riata, or the other way around. This culminated in the rise of Cínaed mac Ailpín in the 840s, who brought to power the House of Alpin who were leaders of a combined Gaelic–Pictish kingdom for almost two centuries.

In 870 Dumbarton was besieged by Amlaíb Conung and Ímar, "the two kings of the Northmen", who "returned to Dublin from Britain" the following year with numerous captives. Dumbarton was the capital of the Kingdom of Strathclyde and this was clearly a major assault which may have brought the whole of mainland Scotland under temporary Ui Imair control. Three years earlier Vikings had seized Northumbria, forming the Kingdom of York and subsequently conquered much of England except for a reduced Kingdom of Wessex, leaving the new combined Pictish and Gaelic kingdom almost encircled. Amlaíb and his brother Auisle "ravaged the whole of Pictland and took their hostages" and later occupied this territory for a protracted period. The 875 Battle of Dollar was another major setback for the Picts/Scots.

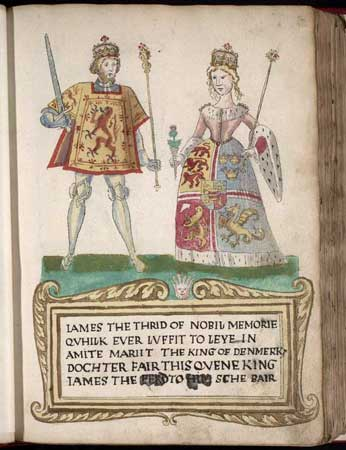
James III and Margaret, whose betrothal led to Orkney passing from Norway to Scotland.

In 902 the Norse suffered a serious reverse in Ireland losing control of Dublin and this seems to have intensified attacks on the emerging kingdom of Alba. A year later Dunkeld was attacked and Ímar, the "grandson of Ímar" was killed in battle with the forces of Constantine II in mainland Scotland. In the late tenth century the battle of "Innisibsolian" was won by Alban forces over Vikings. (Note: The battle has been identified as possibly taking place near the Slate Islands of Argyll, although this seems speculative.) Yet these events were setbacks for the Norse rather than a definitive moment. Of more significance were their defeats at the Battle of Brunanburh in 937 and at the Battle of Tara in 980.

In 962 Ildulb mac Causantín, King of Scots, was killed (according to the Chronicle of the Kings of Alba) fighting the Norse near Cullen, at the Battle of Bauds but the line of the House of Alpin held firm and the threat posed by the Scandinavian presence to the emergent Kingdom of Scotland lessened. Perhaps to counter growing Irish influence in the Western Isles Magnus Barelegs re-established direct Norwegian overlordship there by 1098. He first took Orkney, the northern Scottish mainland and the Hebrides, where he "dyed his sword red in blood" in the Uists. In that year, Edgar of Scotland signed a treaty with Magnus which settled much of the boundary between the Scots and Norwegian claims in the islands. Edgar formally acknowledged the existing situation by giving up his claims to the Hebrides and Kintyre. (Note: There were a few exceptions. For example, Luing and Lismore were retained by the Scots in the treaty of 1098.)

Following the intervention of Somerled and his death at the Battle of Renfrew the Kings of the Isles were weakened relative to the Scottish state, but more than 150 years later Norway intervened again, this time unsuccessfully. Following Haakon Haakonarson's ill-fated invasion and the stalemate of the Battle of Largs the Hebrides and Mann and all rights that the Norwegian crown "had of old therein" were yielded to the Kingdom of Scotland as a result of the 1266 Treaty of Perth.

In 1468 Orkney was pledged by Christian I, in his capacity as king of Norway, as security against the payment of the dowry of his daughter Margaret, betrothed to James III of Scotland. As the money was never paid, the connection with the crown of Scotland has become perpetual. (Note: Apparently without the knowledge of the Norwegian Rigsraadet (Council of the Realm), Christian pawned Orkney for 50,000 Rhenish guilders. On 28 May the next year he also pawned Shetland for 8,000 Rhenish guilders. He secured a clause in the contract that gave future kings of Norway the right to redeem the islands for a fixed sum of 210 kg of gold or 2,310 kg of silver. Several attempts were made during the 17th and 18th centuries to redeem the islands, without success.)

== Religion, culture and economy ==
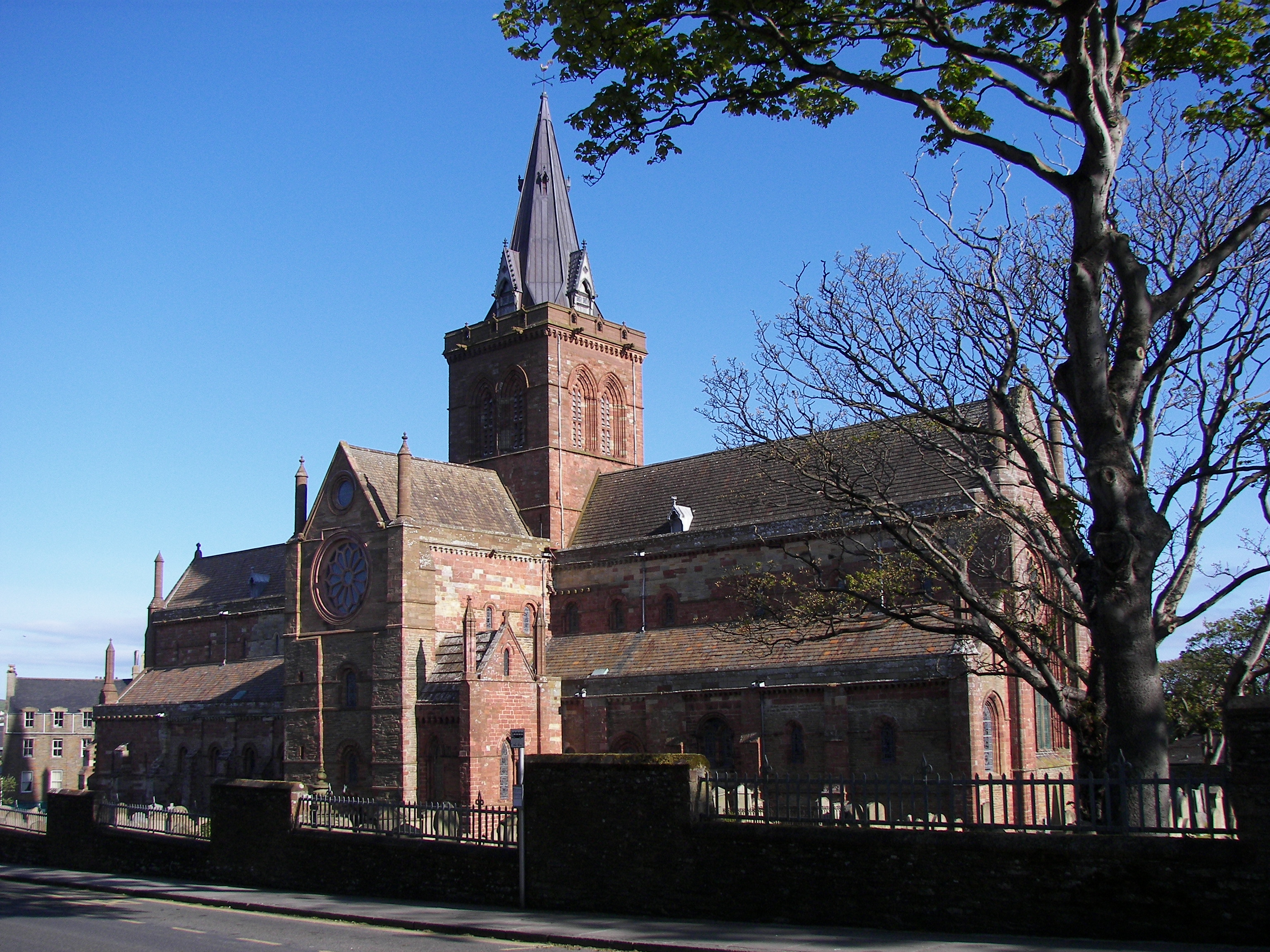
Magnus Erlendsson, Earl of Orkney was killed by his cousin Haakon Paulsson in April 1116. The building of St. Magnus Cathedral, Kirkwall in his honour by Rögnvald Kali commenced in 1137.

Although there is evidence of varying burial rites practised by Norse settlers in Scotland, such as grave goods found on Colonsay and Westray, there is little that enables a confirmation that the Norse gods were venerated prior to the reintroduction of Christianity. The Odin Stone has been used as evidence of Odinic beliefs and practices but the derivation may well be from "oathing stone". A few Scandinavian poetic references suggest that Orcadian audiences understood elements of the Norse pantheon, although this is hardly conclusive proof of active beliefs. Nonetheless, it is likely that pagan practices existed in early Scandinavian Scotland.

According to the sagas, the Northern Isles were Christianised by Olav Tryggvasson in 995 when he stopped at South Walls on his way from Ireland to Norway. The King summoned the jarl Sigurd the Stout and said "I order you and all your subjects to be baptised. If you refuse, I'll have you killed on the spot and I swear I will ravage every island with fire and steel." Unsurprisingly, Sigurd agreed and the islands became Christian at a stroke, receiving their own bishop, Henry of Lund (also known as "the Fat"), who was appointed sometime prior to 1035. (Note: Crawford (1987) has the first bishop of Orkney as Thorolf who must have been appointed after 1042.) The greatest source of Scottish influence after the appointment of the Scottish earls in the 13th century was probably through the church, although it is clear that Scots influence on the culture of Orkney and Shetland was fairly limited until the close of the 14th century or later. An influx of Scottish entrepreneurs helped to create a diverse and independent community that included farmers, fishermen and merchants that called themselves Communitas Orchadensis and who proved themselves increasingly able to defend their rights against their feudal overlords, be they Norwegian or Scots. This independence of mind may have been fostered by the influence of Norwegian government which was essentially communal and federal by contrast with Scotland. It was not until the mid-16th century that the Norse institutions were replaced by Scottish systems following large-scale immigration from the south and the islanders were probably bi-lingual until the 17th century. (Note: Imsen (2007) writes of the period after 1370 that "there is reason to believe that the Orcadians, like the Shetlanders were bilingual for centuries to come". There is also a remarkable record relating to South Ronaldsay in the 17th century that the Orcadians there "most resemble the Scots of Caithness, with whom they have constant trade, in customs and Irish language".)

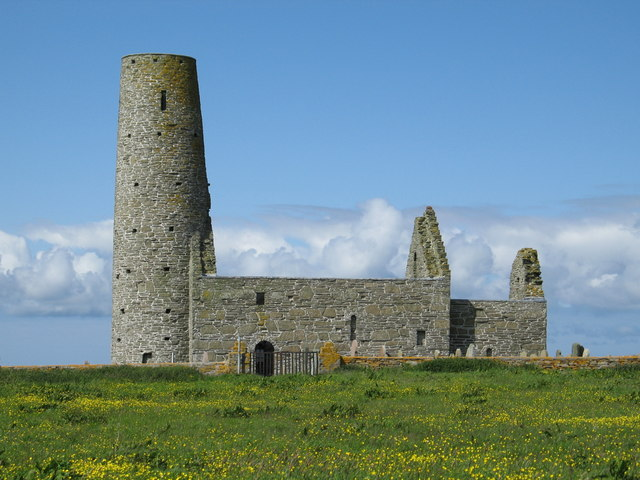
St. Magnus Church, Egilsay

Once again, the situation in the Hebrides is much less clear. There was a Bishop of Iona until the late 10th century and there is then a gap of more than a century, possibly filled by the Bishops of Orkney, before the appointment of the first Bishop of Mann in 1079. The conversion of Scandinavian Scotland and the resultant end to slavery and integration of Viking society into mainstream European culture was a significant event. It took place at an early date, although the popular image of marauding berserkers and of the Norse as "enemies of social progress" remains despite considerable evidence that in their latter phase the Norse-speaking populations were rather "enlightened practitioners of maritime commercial principles". Þings were open-air governmental assemblies that met in the presence of the jarl and the meetings were open to virtually all free men. At these sessions decisions were made, laws passed and complaints adjudicated. Examples include Tingwall and Law Ting Holm in Shetland, Dingwall in Easter Ross, and Tynwald on the Isle of Man.

Women enjoyed a relatively high status during the Viking Age, possibly due to the high degree of mobility in society. There is little knowledge of their role in the Scandinavian colonies of Scotland although the indirect evidence of graves during the pagan and Christian periods suggests roles similar to those held elsewhere. Amongst the best known figures are Gormflaith ingen Murchada, Gunnhild Gormsdóttir, Aud the Deep-Minded and Ingibjörg, the daughter of Earl Hakon Paulsson and wife of King Olaf Godredsson.

The Norse legacy of art and architecture is limited. The Christchurch at Brough of Birsay, now reduced, was the early seat of the Bishops of Orkney. St. Magnus Cathedral, Kirkwall is peerless as an example of Norse-era construction in Scotland and St. Magnus Church, on Egilsay retains its round tower. The iconic Lewis chessmen are the best-known treasure trove and numerous finds of grave goods, including brooches and weaponry such as the Scar boat burial, are well documented.

There is growing evidence of the importance of trade and commerce. Data from the Outer Hebrides suggests that pigs were a more important aspect of Viking farming than prior to that time, that red deer numbers may have been controlled rather than the species simply being subject to hunting, that herring fishing became an important commercial consideration and that trade with centres to the south such as Dublin and Bristol may have been important. Coins found at Bornais and Cille Pheadair were produced in Norway, Westphalia, and England, although there were none from Scotland. Ivory from Greenland was also found there.

== Present day influence ==
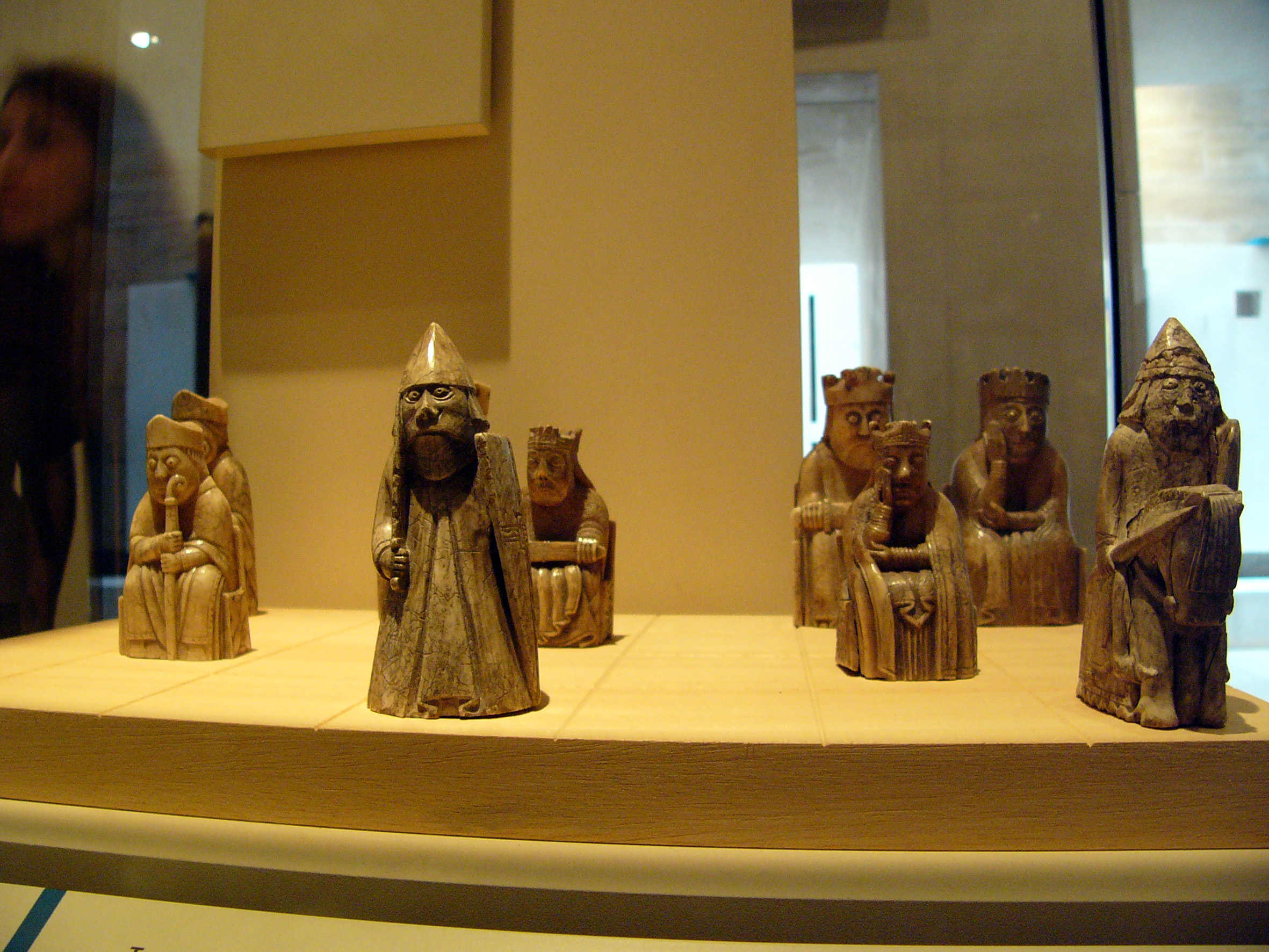
Lewis chessmen in the National Museum of Scotland

Norse and Viking colonisations and settlements have made an impression on peripheral Scotland, the evidence for which can be found in place names, language, genetics and other aspects of cultural heritage.

The Scandinavian influence in Scotland was probably at its height in the mid-11th century during the time of Thorfinn Sigurdsson, who attempted to create a single political and ecclesiastical domain stretching from Shetland to Man. The Suðreyjar have a total land area of approximately 8,374 square kilometres (3,233 sq mi). (Note: The land areas of the Suðreyjar are as follows: the Isle of Man is 572 square kilometres (221 sq mi); the Islands of the Clyde 574 square kilometres (222 sq mi); the Inner Hebrides 4,158 square kilometres (1,605 sq mi); the Outer Hebrides 3,070 square kilometres (1,185 sq mi).) Caithness and Sutherland have a combined area of 7,051 square kilometres (2,722 sq mi) and the permanent Scandinavian holdings in Scotland at that time must therefore have been at minimum between a fifth and a quarter of the land area of modern Scotland. (Note: The land area of Viking Scotland would have been greater if place name evidence in Argyll and the south west is taken into account.)

The Viking invasions may have inadvertently played a role in the creation of modern Scotland. Their destructive raids initially weakened Pictland, Strathclyde and Dál Riata, but these "harassed remnants" eventually became a united front and Norse aggression thus played a significant role in the creation of the kingdom of Alba, the nucleus from which the Scottish kingdom expanded as the Viking influence waned, just as in the south Wessex expanded to become the kingdom of England.

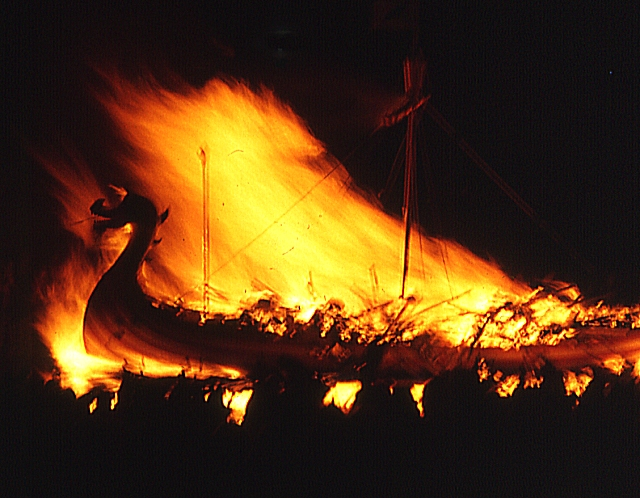
Up Helly Aa in Lerwick

Some Scots take pride in their Scandinavian ancestry. For example, Clan MacLeod of Lewis claims its descent from Leod, who according to tradition was a younger son of Olaf the Black. Clan MacNeacail of Skye also claim Norse ancestry, and occasional references are made to the idea of Scotland joining "the Nordic circle of nations" in modern political debate. (Note: Peter Shore MP once remarked that Labour leader John Smith was "too Nordic to understand southern greed" and the topic of Scotland's relationships with the Scandinavian countries has been referred to in the context of the proposed referendum on Scottish independence.) Yet, unlike the Danelaw in England, the Scandinavian occupation of Scotland has no single common name. This may be a reflection of the less well documented nature of the various invasions involved, but it also hints at a relative lack of popular understanding of the history. By comparison to the Roman occupations of Scotland the Norse kingdoms were much longer lived, more recent and had a significantly more dramatic influence on spoken language and by extension culture and lifestyles generally. They were however confined to areas that are relatively remote from the main centres of modern population. Furthermore, regardless of the actual impact of Scandinavian culture, the hereditary leaders of the Scots nation are generally descended from Pictish and Gaelic stock. The Vikings are thus often seen in a negative light and as a foreign invasion rather than as a key part of a multi-cultural polity.

Nonetheless, in the Northern Isles the Scandinavian connection is still celebrated, one of the best-known such events being the Lerwick fire-festival Up Helly Aa. In particular, Shetland's connection with Norway has proven to be enduring. When Norway became independent again in 1905 the Shetland authorities sent a letter to King Haakon VII in which they stated: "Today no 'foreign' flag is more familiar or more welcome in our voes and havens than that of Norway, and Shetlanders continue to look upon Norway as their mother-land, and recall with pride and affection the time when their forefathers were under the rule of the Kings of Norway." At the 2013 Viking Congress held in Shetland the Scottish Government announced plans to strengthen Scotland’s historic links with Scandinavia.
