= Magnus II, Earl of Orkney =

Earl of Orkney

Magnus II
- Earl of Orkney and Caithness
- Reign: 1236–1239
- Predecessor: Jon Haraldsson
- Successor: Gilbert
- Full name: Magnus II
- Born: c. 1185 or 1190; Scotland
- Died: 1239; Orkney Islands, Scotland
- Issue: Gilbert, Earl of Orkney and Caithness
- Father: Gille Críst, 4th Earl of Angus
- Mother: Ingibiorg Ericsdottir
- Occupation: Earl of Orkney and Caithness

Magnus II (c. 1185 or 1190 – 1239) was the first in the Angus line of Scottish earls (or jarls) of Orkney. His title was "Earl of Orkney and Caithness."

He was the son of Gille Críst, Earl of Angus, and his second wife, Ingibiorg Ericsdottir of Caithness; Ingibiorg was the granddaughter of Orkneyar Jarl Rögnvald Kali Kolsson. Magnus was granted the Earldom of Orkney by King Haakon IV of Norway in 1236 following the death of Jon Haraldsson in 1231 despite there being several other claimants to the jarldom. (The first Magnus of Orkney was St. Magnus Erlendsson, who ruled from 1108 to about 1117.) He died three years later, and was succeeded by his son Gilbert.

Vacant Title last held by Jon Haraldsson	Earl of Orkney; 1236–1239	Succeeded by Gilbert
