= Dalby Church =

Church in Dalby, Lund Municipality, Scania

- Dalby kyrka
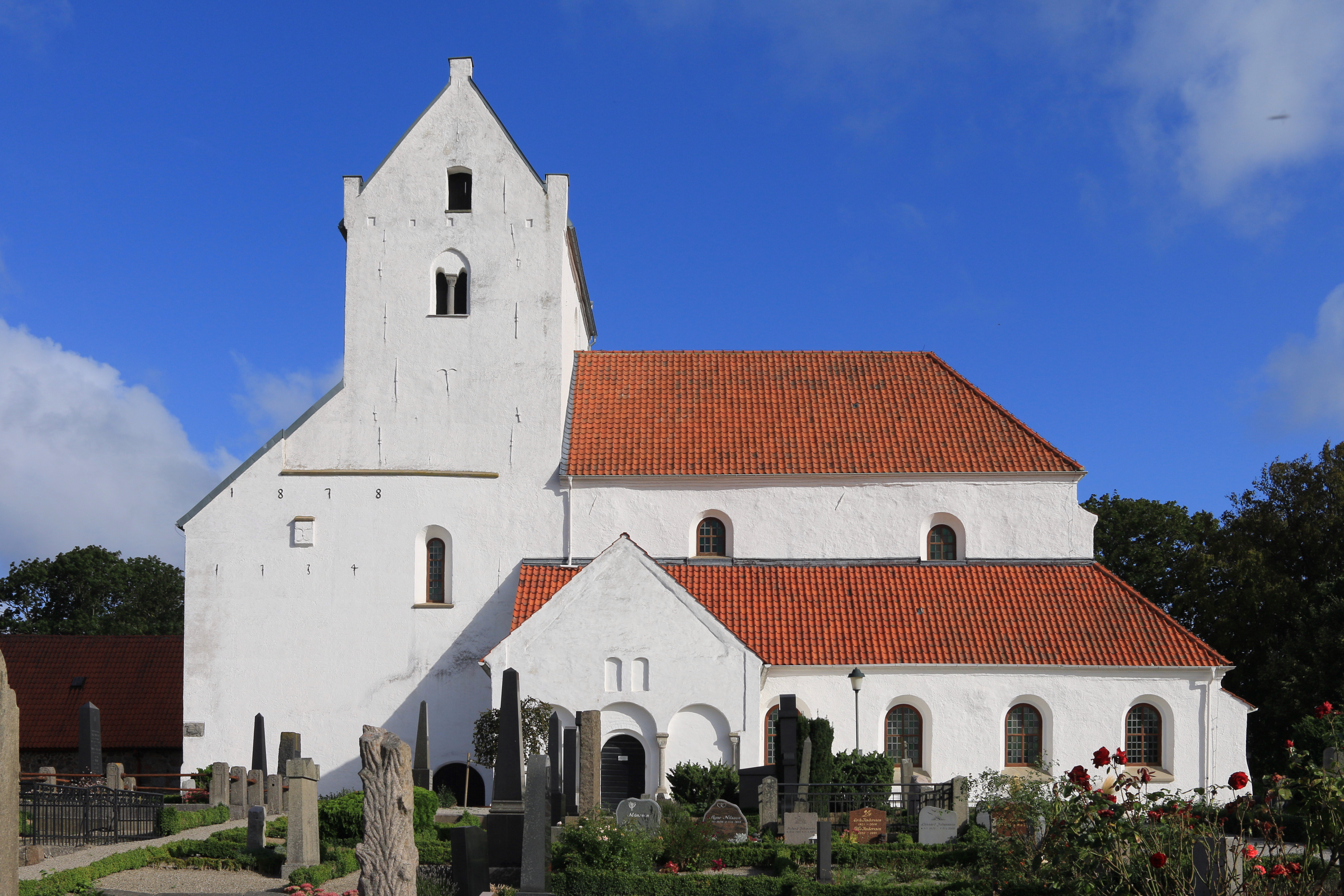
- Dalby Church, view from the south

- Location within Skåne Location within Sweden Location within Europe
- 55°39′52″N 13°20′39″E
- Country: Sweden
- Denomination: Church of Sweden

Dalby Church (Swedish: Dalby kyrka), sometimes also called the Church of the Holy Cross in Dalby (Heligkorskyrkan i Dalby) is a church in Dalby, Lund Municipality in the Swedish province of Scania. It is one of the oldest churches in Sweden. When it was built Dalby was part of Denmark, and the church was commissioned by King Sweyn II of Denmark. It was constructed during the second half of the 11th century. For six years, it served as the seat of a bishop, before the diocese was merged with the Diocese of Lund nearby. The church was built with inspiration from Hildesheim Cathedral, and masons from Hildesheim appear to have worked on its construction site.

Archaeological excavations have revealed the remains of buildings west of the church, which some researchers have interpreted as the remains of a royal palace connected to the church, or possibly some kind of ecclesiastical compound. The church was enlarged during the 12th century, and a community of canons serving it eventually developed into a full monastery. In the 13th century, new buildings were built for the monastery. Some of these are partially preserved north of the church. Following the Reformation and the dissolution of the monastery in 1541, the church suffered neglect and dilapidation: in 1686 the apse was demolished and in the 1750s the east part collapsed. Since the late 19th century, the church has been extensively investigated by archaeologists and restored.

The building consists of a nave, a south aisle and a west tower. Less than half of the original building has been preserved. The entrance is through a church porch added in the 13th century. Inside, the church is whitewashed (as is the facade) with the exception of those walls which remain from the first church. An unusual element is the westernmost south pillar of the nave which contains a niche in which a smaller column has been inserted. It is probably a symbolic representation of Boaz and Jachin, two pillars from Solomon's Temple. The crypt is very similar to the crypt of Lund Cathedral, and has four decorated pillars supporting its groin vaults. The church contains a decorated baptismal font from the 12th century, medieval wooden sculptures, a pulpit from 1705 and an altarpiece from the middle of the 18th century. It belongs to the Church of Sweden and lies within the Diocese of Lund.

== Historical background and foundation ==
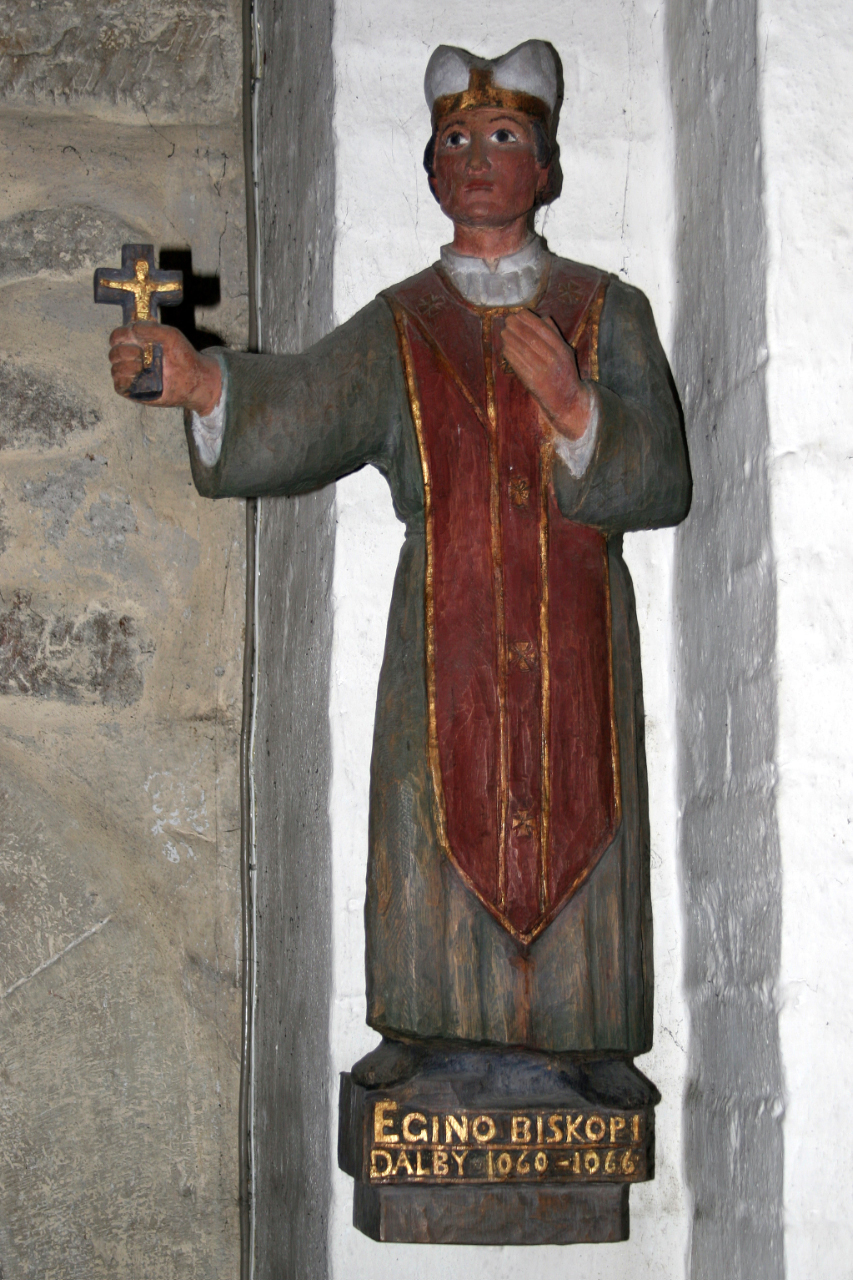
Modern wooden sculpture of Bishop Egino in the church

Dalby Church is one of the oldest churches in Scania and is sometimes claimed to be the oldest stone church in Sweden, or even the Nordic countries, still in use. In the medieval illuminated manuscript Necrologium Lundense, today kept in the library of Lund University, there is a note stating that King Sweyn II of Denmark (c. 1019 – 1076) built the church in Dalby (Dalby and the rest of Scania were part of Denmark until the Treaty of Roskilde in 1658, when the province became Swedish). Chronicler Adam of Bremen further relates that King Sweyn decided to form two new dioceses in Scania after the death of Bishop Avoco of Roskilde around 1060. One bishop, Henry, was installed in Lund (where Lund Cathedral still is the seat of the Bishop of Lund), and the other, Egino, was installed in nearby Dalby. When Henry died after only six years, Egino was however installed as bishop in Lund and Dalby ceased to be a functioning diocese. Dalby continued to enjoy the attention of the royal family, however: King Harald III was buried there in 1080 and Canute IV donated large sums of money to Dalby.

From the outset, the church formed the centre of a complex of buildings. During the first half of the 11th century, a large wooden structure was built about 25 metres (82 ft) west of the church. It was replaced by a stone building during the second half of the same century. Soon thereafter another stone building was built in an angle to the first one. This building activity has been interpreted as the nucleus of a royal estate of some sort. Archaeologist Erik Cinthio led the excavations on site in the 1960s and was the first to propose that the buildings west of the church were the remains of a royal palace. Anders Andrén has argued that the church and the buildings to the west of it formed part of an extensive royal palace complex inspired by Carolingian and Ottonian German examples, and that it in addition may have included mills, villages, a mint and a royal deer park, parts of which would today be preserved in nearby Dalby Söderskog National Park and Dalby Norreskog. Other interpretations have also been put forward. The building remains were initially discovered by Sten Anjou who proposed that they may be the remains of an atrium in front of the church, and theologist Stephan Borgehammar has argued that they may have been a pillared courtyard used by the canons of the church in an ecclesiastical edifice.

== Building history ==
=== Construction and expansion ===
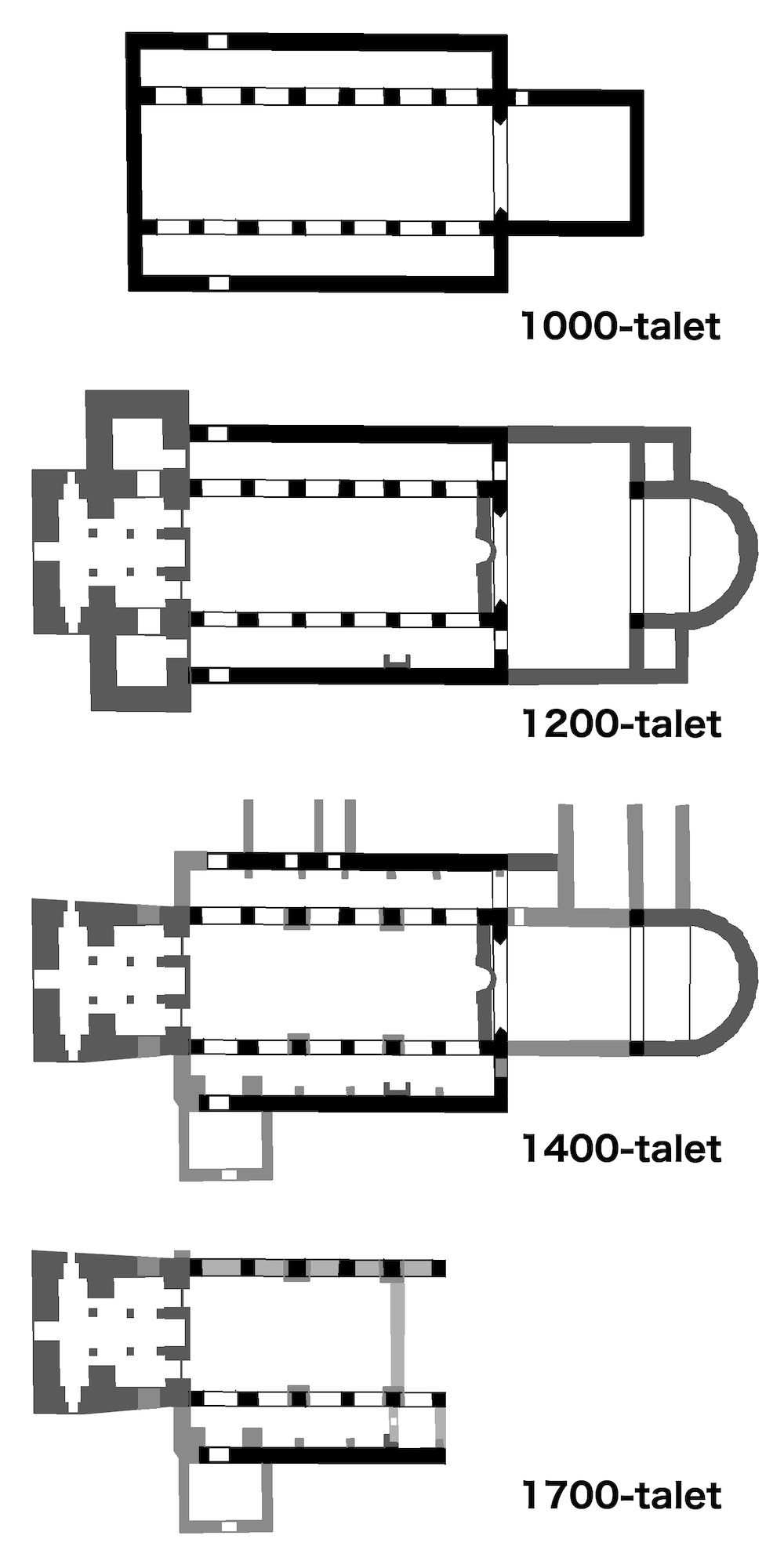
Floor plans showing the approximate development of the church, from top: 11th century; 13th century; 15th century; 18th century

The exact age of the church is not known, but its oldest parts were probably built during the second half of the 11th century. The history of the church's construction is intricate, and has been revised several times. When it was built, it appears to have been stylistically closely related to Hildesheim Cathedral and the predecessor of the current Roskilde Cathedral, and it is probable that masons from Hildesheim were involved in the construction of Dalby Church. The church was originally probably a basilica, formed of a central nave, seven bays long, and two lateral aisles. The chancel ended in a straight wall facing east and thus lacked an apse. The nave was divided from the aisles by pillars supporting round arched openings, and the clerestory contained six windows in both the north and the south wall, grouped in pairs above the arches dividing the nave from the aisle. The church had two portals, one in the south wall and one in the north. Traces of walls found north and south of the current west end of the church may have formed part of a narthex in the original church. The crypt was also part of the church from the start.

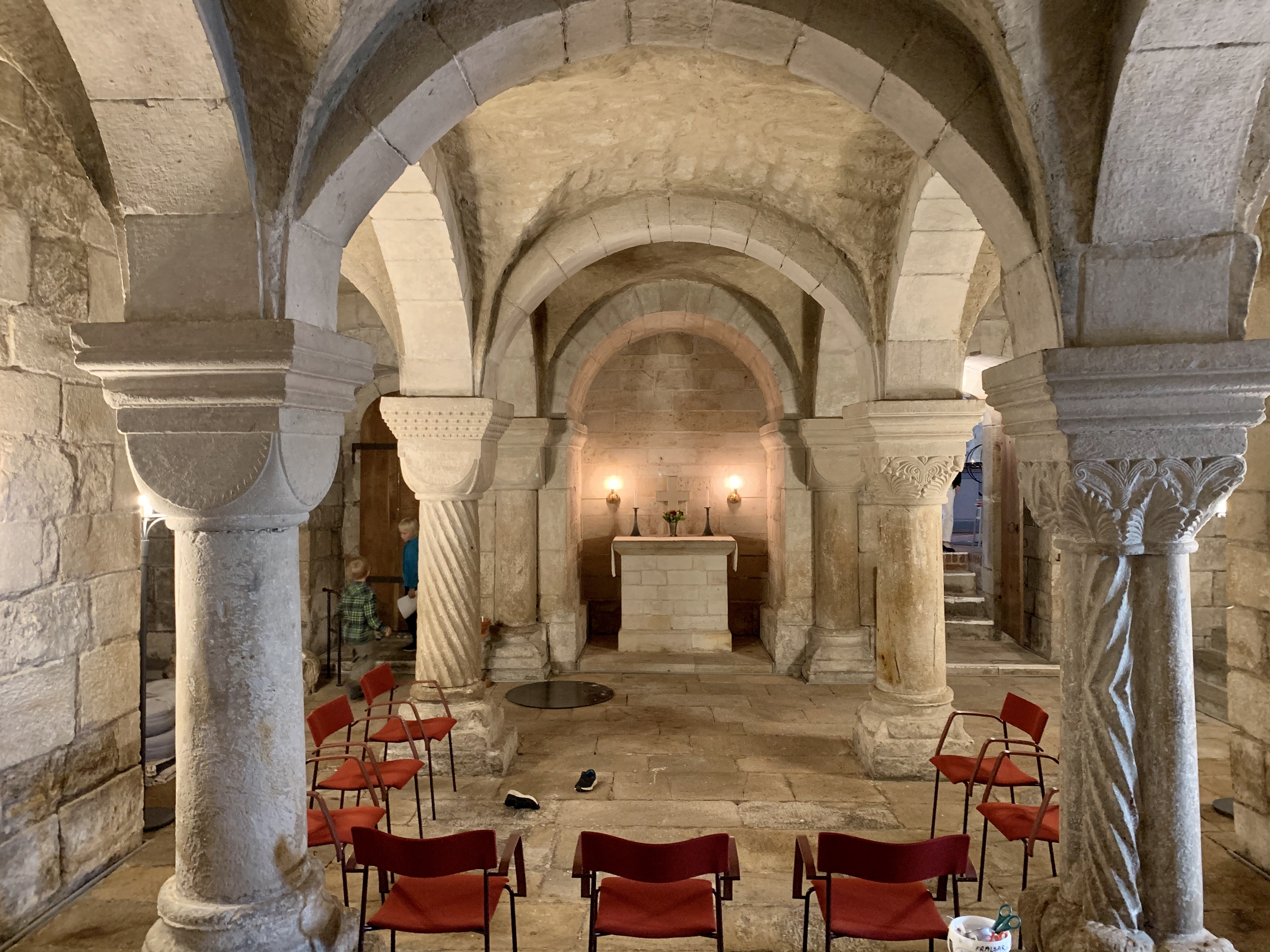
The crypt, largely unchanged since its vaults were built in the 12th century

During the 12th century, the church was enlarged and partially redesigned. The nave was shortened towards the west, and the entire west end of the church remade into something resembling a westwork. The crypt was converted into an entrance hall, its current vaults were built and an entrance facing west, toward the courtyard of the building complex adjacent to the church there, was opened. The entrance hall, which later again became transformed into a crypt, is stylistically very similar to the crypt of Lund Cathedral, and mason's marks from the same masons have been found in both crypts. An upper floor was added above the crypt in Dalby, in layout similar to the entrance hall, and this part of the church developed into a short tower. The two rooms were connected with staircase towers in both the north and south corners, in an angle to the nave. The upper floor of the tower appears to have been connected to the building complex to the west of the church, since there originally was an entrance to the west also on the second floor. The decoration surrounding the current west portal of the church (on the ground floor) may originally have belonged to this entrance on the second floor.

=== Monastery ===
A community of canons aligned with the reform movement of the time had been instituted by Bishop Egino. In the course of the 12th century, the community developed into a regular male monastery (Dalby kloster) following the Rule of Saint Augustine and the title of the head of the community changed from provost to prior sometime between 1136 and the 1160s. The size of the priory throughout most of the Middle Ages has been calculated to have been comparable to that of an average English Augustinian monastery from the same time, housing on average around twelve people including the prior.

The gradual establishment of the priory in Dalby led to substantial changes for the church and its surroundings. The church itself was enlarged towards the east and equipped with an apse and vaults, perhaps sometime around 1234 when vaults of a very similar design were built in Lund Cathedral. The two-storey westwork was also rebuilt into the presently visible tower, and the current large church porch or entrance hall added outside the south entrance, probably to provide the lay congregation with a new entrance to the church (while the canons entered the church from the north). The buildings of the monastery were built north of the church, forming a square around a courtyard. An unknown number of subsidiary buildings probably also existed. The monastic buildings were probably built during the 13th century. Remains of three of these buildings have survived. The former west wing is the main building of the current estate on the site (Dalby kungsgård), making it the oldest inhabited residential building in Scania. Both the church and the monastery were damaged by fire in 1388, and again in the middle of the 15th century by Swedish troops under the command of Charles VIII of Sweden.

=== Reformation and dilapidation ===
Following the Reformation, the monastery was disbanded in 1541 and its land divided. As a consequence, the financial foundation for the upkeep of the church and the surrounding buildings vanished. The church began to suffer from neglect. The monastery's buildings and land were taken over by the Danish Crown, who converted the monastery into a stud farm. It continued to be used for horse breeding by the Swedish government after the province became part of Sweden. In 1809, the stud farm was closed and since then the farm has been leased out as a regular farm. It is still owned by the National Property Board of Sweden.

Dalby village was burnt by Swedish troops during the Torstenson War in 1645, when the church was possibly also damaged. In 1686 King Charles XI of Sweden ordered the demolition of the apse, to use the stone for other building projects in Malmö. When Carl Linnaeus passed through Dalby in 1749 he described it as "a ruin of an old monastery". In 1755 or 1756 the eastern vaults collapsed, and two years later the entire eastern part of the building was demolished. Since then, the church has remained largely unchanged.

=== Excavations and renovations ===
Since the late 19th century, the building has attracted the attention of several archaeologists. The first systematic excavation was done at the east end of the church by Oscar Montelius in 1891. The following year repairs were done to the western part of the north wall of the church, and in connection with this another excavation was done by Friedrich Seesselberg. Fifteen years later, a new archaeological examination was carried out, this time south of the church. Between 1919 and 1920 further examinations were made, including of the walls, for which some of the whitewash was removed. In 1936 repairs were again combined with examinations of the building by archaeologist Ragnar Blomqvist. The entrance was renovated in 1940–41, and in 1965 and 1966 extensive excavations were made west of the church. The facade was restored and at the same time the walls examined again in 1977, 1984 and 1987.The church was renovated in 2023, and the baptismal font was placed near the pulpit.

== Architecture ==
=== Exterior ===
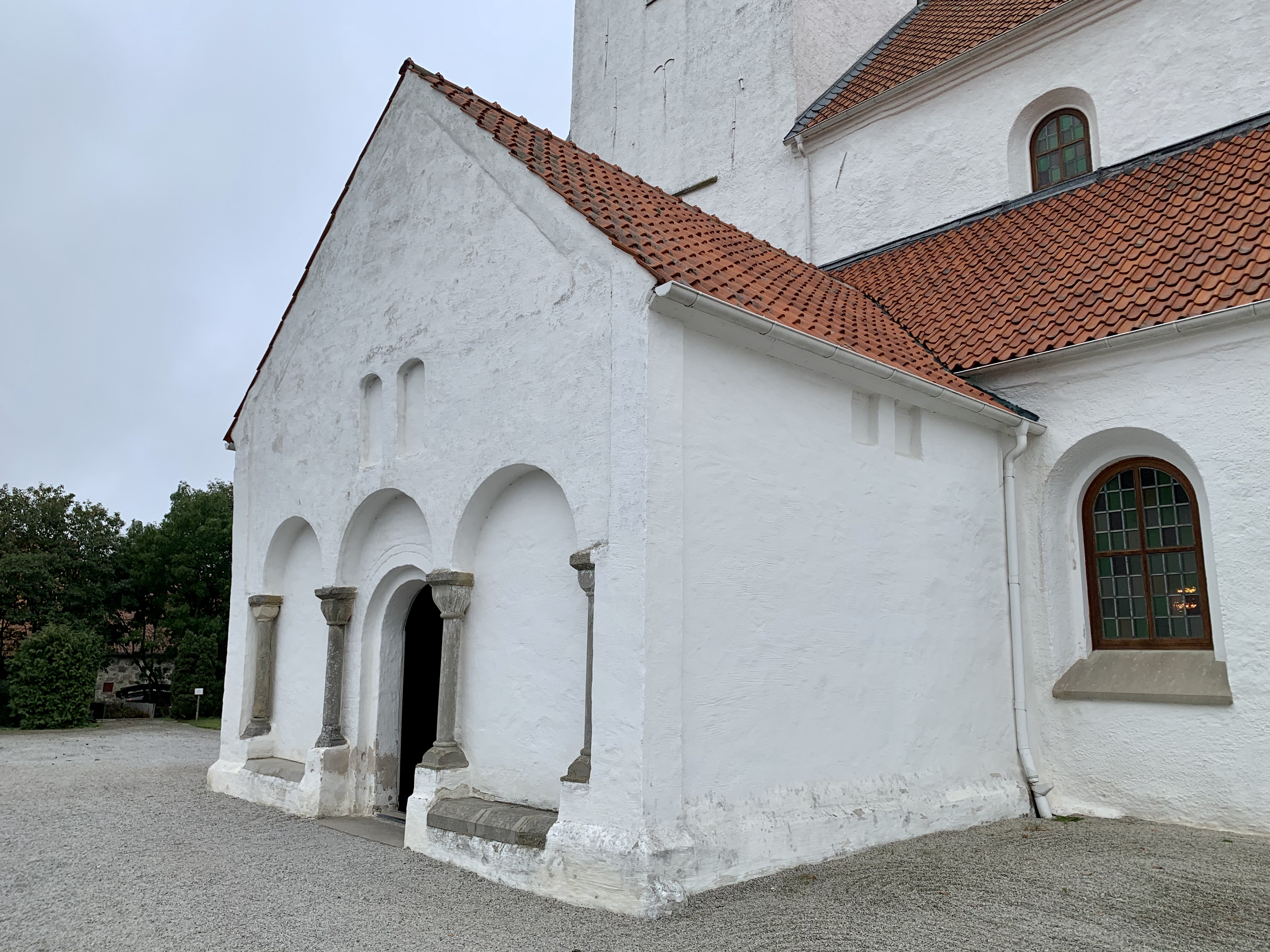
The main entrance, through the 13th-century church porch

The building consists of a nave and a south aisle, the remains of less than half of the original church. It is supported by five buttresses. The church has a broad west tower and a church porch or entrance in front of the original south entrance. The current entrance is through a portal placed centrally in the south facade of the church porch, with blind arches on either side supported by two pairs of columns; only the western pair is original. The church is largely whitewashed, but the lower part of the west end of the tower is of bare sandstone. Some sculpted elements in the facade are also visible: the tympanum above the west portal to the church shows Samson and the lion, and a sandstone relief depicting a lion is also inserted in the north part of the west facade. A similar relief, depicting a knight on horseback, sits in the south facade. The tower has openings facing north, east and south divided by small columns with decorated capitals. The openings to the west are in the form of lunettes.

=== Interior ===
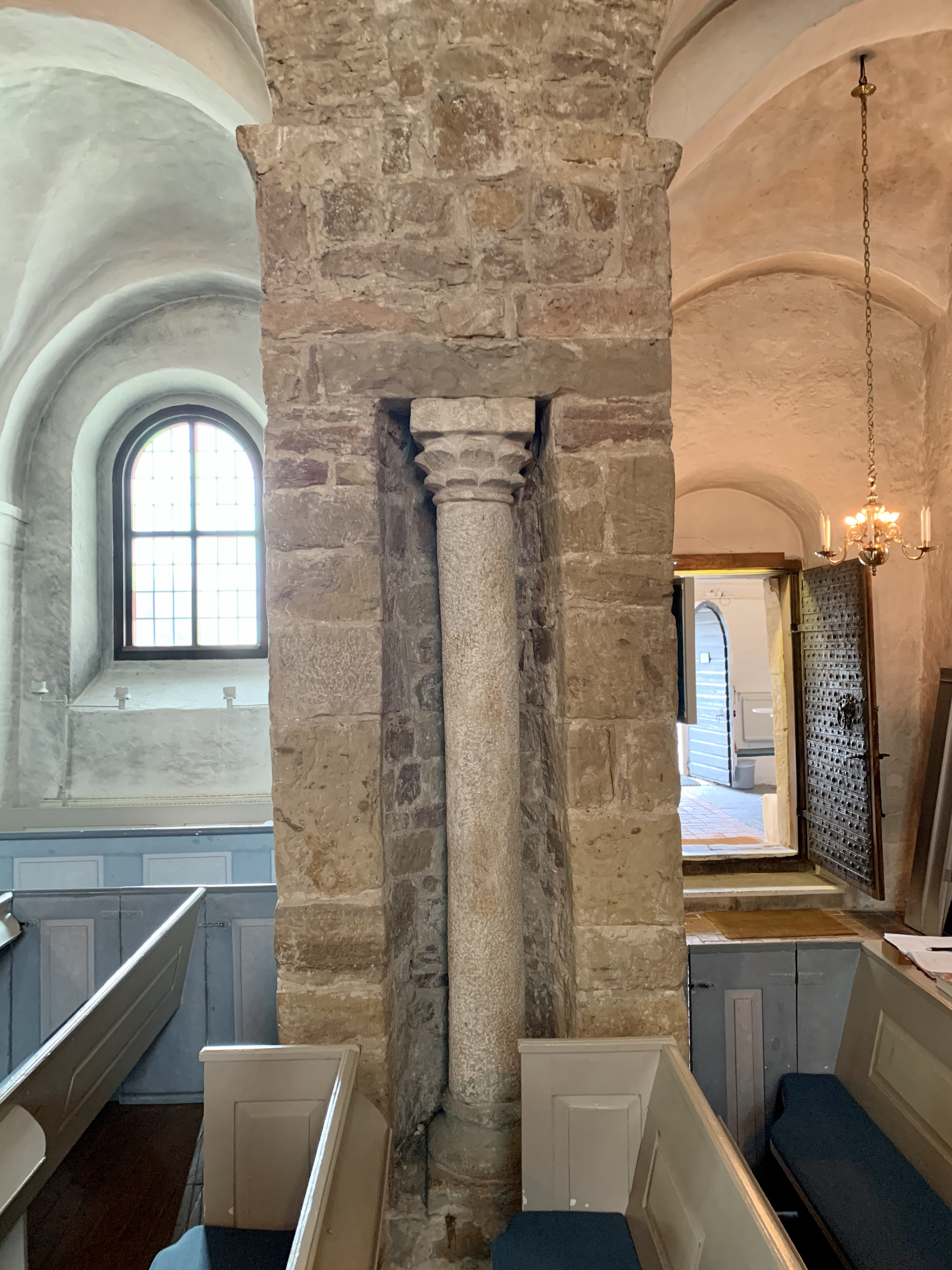
The column in a niche inside one of the pillars: probably a symbolic representation of Boaz and Jachin

The nave is 11.5 metres (38 ft) high, more than double the height of the south aisle. Four round arches separate the nave and the aisle. Its vaults are decorated with ornamental murals from the middle of the 13th century. Inside the church is whitewashed with the exception of those parts which are from the very first building period. The walls of the nave and the south aisle are still largely original, dating from the very first construction period. Traces of four of the original windows of the church remain. They are today visible on the south wall of the nave as blind arches. The westernmost south pillar of the nave has a niche in which a smaller, round column has been inserted. Remains of a similar arrangement have been found on the facing pillar on the north side. This has been interpreted as a symbolic representation of Boaz and Jachin, two columns which stood on the porch of Solomon's Temple. Such arrangements are unusual, but known also from Würzburg Cathedral and, possibly, Santa Maria Maggiore in Tuscania. The chancel is slightly higher than the nave, and separated from it by a few steps. Above the windows in the wall facing east there are two Romanesque decorated consoles, probably re-used from the earlier chancel. The church porch containing the entrance to the church has an almost square floor plan. Facing the nave to the west is the gallery containing the church organ. Under it is the crypt, reachable from the nave via two stairs, to the south and north. The crypt has nine groin vaults supported by four pillars and eight engaged columns with cushion-cap capitals. The four free-standing pillars are each individually shaped and are partially decorated with geometric forms, beasts and floral ornaments.

=== Furnishings ===
The church contains furnishings from several centuries. An inventory from the 16th century mentions a large decorated chandelier, similar to the Hezilo chandelier in Hildesheim Cathedral and perhaps made there, which probably belonged to the original building. A fragment of the chandelier was found in 1919. It was probably confiscated by the Danish Crown during the Reformation and melted down. The church also acquired an illuminated Gospel Book at an early date; the Dalby Gospel Book is today in the Royal Library of Denmark but was probably donated to Dalby Church in conjunction with the ordination of Egino as bishop in 1060. It may have been made in Hamburg–Bremen.

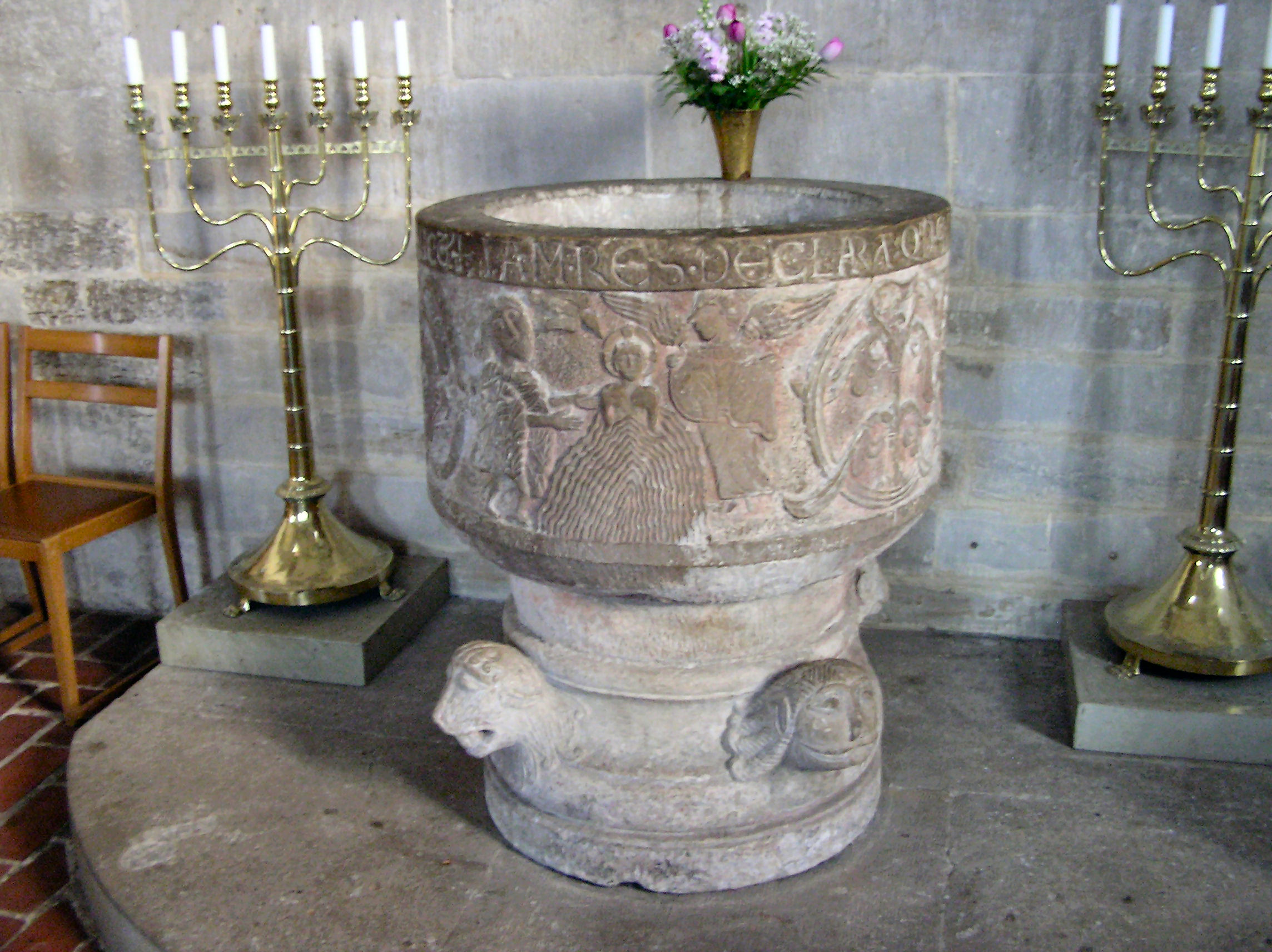
The baptismal font

The baptismal font was made around 1140–1150. It has been attributed to an artist known by a notname as Byzantios, but this attribution is uncertain. The basin is decorated with a relief depicting the Baptism of Jesus. There are also medallions showing a lion, two griffins, a hunter with a dog, ornamental foliage, grapes, and a deer. An inscription in Latin runs across the top of the basin, a verse about the significance of the sacrament of baptism. The base of the font is decorated with sculptures of two human heads and two heads which may be intended to represent lions. Also from the Middle Ages is an oak carving of the Veil of Veronica, a south Scandinavian piece of art from the late 15th or early 16th century. Another wooden sculpture dates from the early 16th century, depicting Saint Olaf. It was probably made in northern Germany. A single seat from a 15th-century choir stall is still located in the chancel, together with copies of two choir stall seats today in Lund University Historical Museum, from the 14th century and with the coat of arms of Denmark carved on their sides. Of the two church bells, one is also from the 14th century. The door to the sacristy has been constructed of fragments from a 16th-century cabinet.

Of later date is the current pulpit, which was installed in 1705 and displays the monogram of King Charles XII of Sweden. The altarpiece was made in a late Baroque style by Johan Ullberg during the middle of the 18th century. The church organ is from 1958 and made by A Mårtenssons orgelfabrik in Lund.

== Use and heritage status ==
Dalby Church belongs to Dalby parish within the Diocese of Lund. Services are held regularly in the church, which is also open for visitors. Information about the church is provided inside in Swedish, Danish, English and German, and visitors may also book a personal visit through the parish. It is a listed building.

== See also ==
- Dalby Gospel Book

== Works cited ==
- Andrén, Anders (2012). "Dalby bortom Heligkorskyrkan. Ett kejserligt landskap i Skåne" [Dalby Beyond the Church of the Holy Cross. An Imperial Landscape in Scania]. In Borgehammar, Stephan; Wienberg, Jes (eds.). Locus celebris: Dalby kyrka, kloster och gård [Locus celebris: Dalby Church, monastery and estate] (in Swedish). Gothenburg: Makadam förlag / Lund University. pp. 351–359. ISBN 9789170611162.
- Anjou, Sten (1928). "En ljuskrona i Dalby Heligkorskyrka" [A chandelier in the Church of the Holy Cross in Dalby] (PDF). Fornvännen. Journal of Swedish Antiquarian Research (in Swedish): 366–371.
- Borgehammar, Stephan (2012a). "Symboler i Dalby" [Symbols in Dalby]. In Borgehammar, Stephan; Wienberg, Jes (eds.). Locus celebris: Dalby kyrka, kloster och gård [Locus celebris: Dalby Church, monastery and estate] (in Swedish). Gothenburg: Makadam förlag / Lund University. pp. 55–91. ISBN 9789170611162.
- Borgehammar, Stephan (2012b). "Kanikerna i Dalby. Tre studier" [The Canons of Dalby. Three studies]. In Borgehammar, Stephan; Wienberg, Jes (eds.). Locus celebris: Dalby kyrka, kloster och gård [Locus celebris: Dalby Church, monastery and estate] (in Swedish). Gothenburg: Makadam förlag / Lund University. pp. 291–326. ISBN 9789170611162.
- Brunius, Carl Georg (1840). "Kort Efterretning om Dalby Kirke og Kloster i Skaane" [Brief Information about Dalby Church and Monastery in Skaane]. Historisk Tidsskrift (in Danish). 1 (1): 148–164.
- Cinthio, Erik (1966). "Kungapalatset i Dalby" [The royal palace in Dalby] (PDF). Ale. Historisk tidskrift för Skåneland (in Swedish) (3): 16–19.
- Cinthio, Maria (2012). "Återfunna fynd och andra pusselbitar. Om inventarier, patrocinier och patroner" [Refound Finds and Other Puzzle Pieces. On Fixtures and Patronage]. In Borgehammar, Stephan; Wienberg, Jes (eds.). Locus celebris: Dalby kyrka, kloster och gård [Locus celebris: Dalby Church, monastery and estate] (in Swedish). Gothenburg: Makadam förlag / Lund University. pp. 447–460. ISBN 9789170611162.
- Dahlberg, Markus; Sjöström, Ingrid, eds. (2015). Skåne. Landskapets kyrkor [Scania. The churches of the province] (in Swedish). Stockholm: Riksantikvarieämbetet (Swedish National Heritage Board). ISBN 978-91-7209-710-0.
- Ericsson, Gertie (2012). "Heliga korsets kyrka. En konstruktionshistoria" [The Church of the Holy Cross. A Constructional History]. In Borgehammar, Stephan; Wienberg, Jes (eds.). Locus celebris: Dalby kyrka, kloster och gård [Locus celebris: Dalby Church, monastery and estate] (in Swedish). Gothenburg: Makadam förlag / Lund University. pp. 237–249. ISBN 9789170611162.
- Laserna, Max (2016). Dalby kyrka, Lunds stift. Kulturhistorisk karaktäristik och bedömning [Dalby Church, Diocese of Lund. Cultural historical characteristic and assessment] (PDF) (Report). Church of Sweden.
- Liepe, Lena (2012). "Dalby kyrkas dopfunt. Formspråk och bildspråk" [The Baptismal Font in Dalby Church. Form and Iconography]. In Borgehammar, Stephan; Wienberg, Jes (eds.). Locus celebris: Dalby kyrka, kloster och gård [Locus celebris: Dalby Church, monastery and estate] (in Swedish). Gothenburg: Makadam förlag / Lund University. pp. 437–446. ISBN 9789170611162.
- Nyborg, Ebbe (2012). "Kong Harald Hens grav i Dalby" [The grave of King Harald Hen in Dalby]. In Borgehammar, Stephan; Wienberg, Jes (eds.). Locus celebris: Dalby kyrka, kloster och gård [Locus celebris: Dalby Church, monastery and estate] (in Danish). Gothenburg: Makadam förlag / Lund University. pp. 151–159. ISBN 9789170611162.
- Rydbeck, Otto (1946). "Lunds domkyrka, byggnadens och dess inventariers historia enligt de nyaste forskningsresultaten" [Lund Cathedral, the history of the building and its furnishings according to the latest research]. In Newman, Ernst (ed.). Lunds domkyrkas historia 1145–1945 [History of Lund Cathedral 1145–1945] (in Swedish). Stockholm: Svenska kyrkans diakonistyrelses bokförlag.
- Rydén, Thomas (2012). "Dalbyboken: en omvärdering av attributionskriterierna" [The Dalby Gospel Book, Attribution Criteria Reconsidered]. In Borgehammar, Stephan; Wienberg, Jes (eds.). Locus celebris: Dalby kyrka, kloster och gård [Locus celebris: Dalby Church, monastery and estate] (in Swedish). Gothenburg: Makadam förlag / Lund University. pp. 424–435. ISBN 9789170611162.
- Wahlöö, Claes (2014). Skånes kyrkor 1050-1949 [The churches of Skåne 1050–1949] (in Swedish). Kävlinge: Domus Propria. ISBN 978-91-637-5874-4.
- Welin, Georg (2004). "Dalby kyrkas äldsta historia. Ett tolkningsförsök" [The earliest history of Dalby. An attempt at an interpretation.] (PDF). Ale. Historisk tidskrift för Skåneland (in Swedish) (4): 1–14.
- Wienberg, Jes (2012). "Mellan kungar och kaniker. Dalby till debatt" [Between Kings and Canons. Dalby Debated]. In Borgehammar, Stephan; Wienberg, Jes (eds.). Locus celebris: Dalby kyrka, kloster och gård [Locus celebris: Dalby Church, monastery and estate] (in Swedish). Gothenburg: Makadam förlag / Lund University. pp. 19–55. ISBN 9789170611162.
