= Dalby Gospel Book =

11th-century gospel book

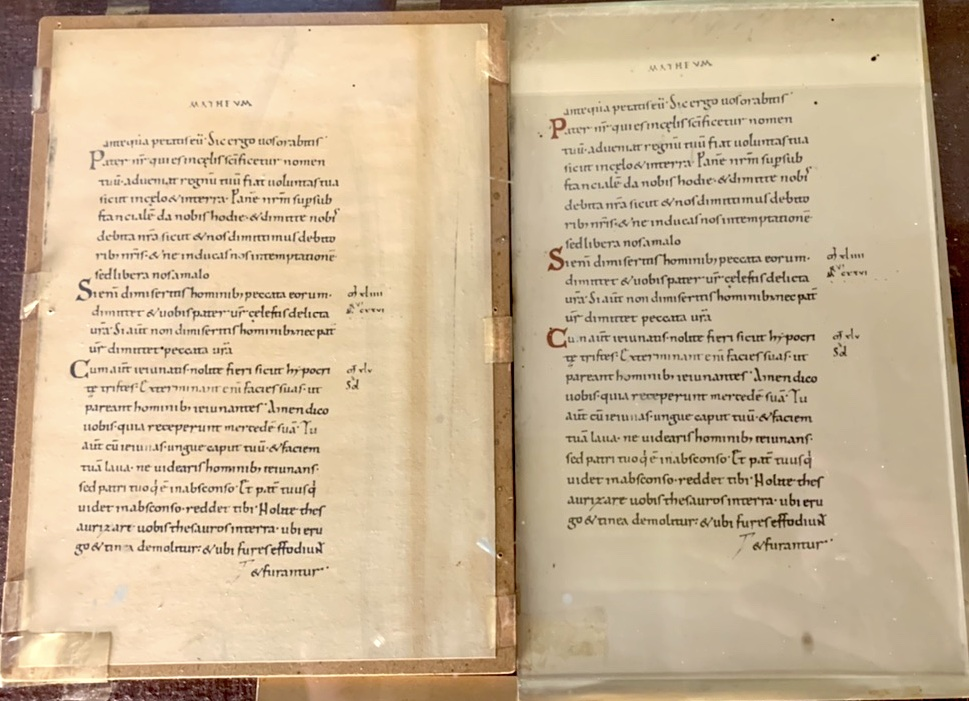
Pages from the Dalby Gospel Book

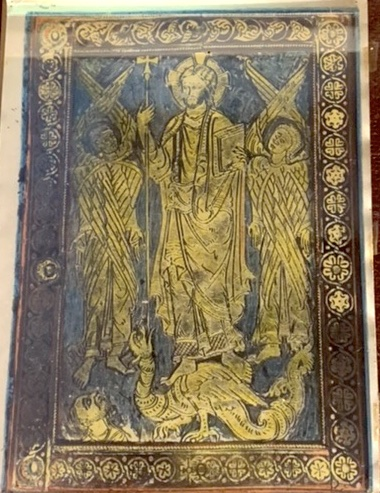
Front cover

The Dalby Gospel Book (Note: Copenhagen GkS 1325 4°, Swedish: Dalbyboken, Danish: Dalbybogen) is an 11th-century gospel book now in the Royal Library of Denmark in Copenhagen. The illuminated manuscript derives its name from Dalby Church in Sweden, where the gospel book was used. During the Middle Ages, Dalby was part of Denmark. It is not known with certainty where the book was made; several researchers have suggested it was made in Dalby, while others point to present-day Germany as a probable place of origin. The manuscript is the earliest testimony of the presence of books and a culture of literacy in Denmark. The book contains four full-page miniatures with portraits of the Four Evangelists, 16 canon tables and a number of simple, red enlarged initials. Its gilt silver and copper binding is from the middle of the 12th century.

== History ==
The gospel book has been dated to the second half of the 11th century on palaeographic grounds. It contains notes made in the 14th and 15th century that clearly indicate that the book was in use in Dalby Church and its priory at that time.

It is not known with certainty where the book was made. Several researchers have suggested it was made in Dalby, in a scriptorium belonging to the priory connected to the church. Others have been more cautious about ascribing the manuscript to a Danish scriptorium. England, or perhaps more probably northern Germany, have also been proposed as places of origin. Elements in the manuscript possibly indicating a Danish origin is what several researchers have called a "provincial" execution (i.e., the illuminations are of comparably lower quality than others from e.g. Germany), a mix of stylistic influences from England and Germany believed to have been conceived in Denmark, and possible influences from Viking art and early Christian bronze crosses from Scania. On the other hand, certain characteristics indicate that it was perhaps not made in Denmark. The pericope list in the manuscript is clearly based on a model from the Diocese of Hamburg–Bremen, and even more precisely, its origin has been suggested to be that of Ramelsloh. Insular art influenced also German book illumination, and furthermore there is no consensus that any elements in the manuscript are clearly influenced by English art. What some researchers have identified as poor quality may also be explained as unfinished, rather than poor, workmanship; the illumination of the manuscript may have been aborted beforehand for some reason.

Dalby was a bishopric for a short period (1060–1066), and it is known that the first bishop Egino was accompanied by a literate entourage from Hamburg–Bremen. Furthermore, there was space at Dalby for a scriptorium. It cannot be ruled out, therefore, that a scriptorium was established quickly in Dalby and the book produced there. However, it is equally possible that the bishop simply brought the book with him to Germany. If it was made in Denmark, it would make it the oldest book made not only in Denmark but in all the Nordic countries, and its decoration would be the oldest painted pictures from Christian time in the Nordic countries. Regardless of its origins, it remains the earliest known testimony of the presence of books and a culture of literacy in Denmark. Dalby Gospel Book is part of the collections of the Royal Library of Denmark.

== Description ==
The Dalby Gospel Book has been described as one of the foremost treasures of the Royal Library of Denmark. It consists of 285 leaves of parchment made from sheep and calf hide (vellum). Its dimensions are 21.5 centimetres (8.5 in) by 15.2 centimetres (6.0 in). The text is written with clear Carolingian minuscules. It contains four full-page miniatures with portraits of the Four Evangelists, executed in a style similar to contemporary illuminated books from Hamburg–Bremen. They are depicted seated, with their symbols; John the Evangelist is depicted with a beard and the others clean shaven. Each one is holding a pen, and is engaged in writing the initial letter of their respective version of the gospel. The page containing the depiction of Luke has been partially spoiled by parts of a recipe for an incantation written by a monk during the 15th century. In addition to these miniatures, there are also 16 canon tables and a number of simple, red enlarged initials. Swedish art historian Ewert Wrangel argued that the illuminations in the Dalby Gospel Book influenced later medieval book production in Lund.

The richly decorated binding consists of wooden boards covered with metal. The front cover is of engraved gilt silver with a depiction of Christ, triumphantly standing on a dragon and flanked by seraphim and cherubim. Christ is holding the Book of Life and a staff with a cross. A bearded face in the lower left corner is probably a donor portrait of the unknown patron of the book. The back cover is made of gilt copper, and depicts the crucifixion, with Mary and John the Evangelist under symbols for the Moon and the Sun. In earlier research it was assumed that the binding had been assembled from pieces of different origin. More recently art historian Thomas Rydén has argued that the entire binding was in fact made at a single time and for the manuscript, since some decorative elements recur on both the front and the back. It probably replaced an earlier binding sometime during the middle of the 12th century.

== See also ==
- Skara Missal
- Necrologium Lundense

== Works cited ==
- Bandle, Oskar; Braunmüller, Kurt; Elmevik, Lennart, eds. (2002). The Nordic Languages: An International Handbook of the History of the North Germanic Languages. Vol. 1. Walter de Gruyter. ISBN 9783110148763.
- Cinthio, Maria (2010). "Dalbyboken – ett evangeliarium från 1000-talet" [The Dalby Gospel Book – an evangeliary from the 11th century]. In Larsson, Anita (ed.). Dalby kyrka. Om en plats i historien [Dalby Church. A place in history] (in Swedish). Lund: Historiska Media. pp. 104–106. ISBN 978-91-86297-28-2.
- Nielsen, Lauritz (1937). Danmarks middelalderlige haandskrifter: en sammenfattende boghistorisk oversigt [The medieval manuscripts of Denmark: a summary book historical overview] (in Danish). Copenhagen: Gyldendalske boghandel/Nordisk forlag. OCLC 828778567.
- Olsen, Kåre; Nordenfalk, Carl, eds. (1952). Gyllene böcker: illuminerade medeltida handskrifter i dansk och svensk ägo [Golden books: illuminated medieval manuscripts in Sweden and Denmark] (in Swedish). Stockholm: Nationalmuseum. OCLC 80657589.
- Rydén, Thomas (2012). "Dalbyboken: en omvärdering av attributionskriterierna" [The Dalby Gospel Book, Attribution Criteria Reconsidered]. In Borgehammar, Stephan; Wienberg, Jes (eds.). Locus celebris: Dalby kyrka, kloster och gård [Locus celebris: Dalby Church, monastery and estate] (in Swedish). Gothenburg: Makadam förlag / Lund University. pp. 424–435. ISBN 9789170611162.
- Wrangel, Ewert (1923). Lunds domkyrkas konsthistoria: förbindelser och stilfränder [The art history of Lund Cathedral: connections and stylistic equals]. Lund: C. W. K. Gleerup. OCLC 491751348.
