= Thorulf of Orkney =

Thorulf
- Bishop of Orkney
- See: Diocese of Orkney
- In office: 1043 x 1072
- Predecessor: Unclear, but Bishop Henry last known
- Successor: John

Orders
- Consecration: 1043 x 1072 (perhaps c. 1050)

Personal details
- Born: unknown unknown
- Died: unclear

Thorulf or Torulf (fl. mid-11th century) was medieval prelate, a Bishop of Orkney. Although probably a native Scandinavian, he is known only from the account of the German writer Adam of Bremen. Adam reported that he was appointed bishop by Adalbert, Archbishop of Hamburg, the first Orcadian appointee under Hamburg overlordship. Thorulf's period of appointment coincided with the reign of Earl Thorfinn Sigurdsson, alleged builder of the Birsay church and founder of the bishopric of Orkney.

== Hamburg and Orkney ==
Thorulf is known only from one source. According to the late 11th-century Saxon writer Adam of Bremen, he was appointed as bishop of Blascona in Orkney by Adalbert, Archbishop of Hamburg. In the mid-11th century, the Archbishop of Hamburg's jurisdiction extended over Scandinavia. Historians identify Blascona with Birsay (Old Norse: Birgisherað), Blascona a Latinisation perhaps derived from an older form.

Adam leaves no personal details about Thorulf, but supplies some information about the Orkney see, stating that the:

...Orkney Islands, although they had previously been ruled by English and Scottish bishops, our primate [Adalbert] on the pope's order consecrated Thorulf bishop for the city of Birsay [in civitatem Blasconam], and he was to have cure of all.

The date was approximately 1050, though could have been at any point between 1043 and 1072, the episcopate of Adalbert. The date 1050 is suggested as this was around the time that Earl Thorfinn Sigurdsson, ruler of Orkney, visited Rome.

== Thorulf and Thorfinn ==
As Adam mentioned that the Orcadians had sent legates, it is thought that Thorulf was appointed at Orcadian instigation, and it has even been suggested that the earl himself was among these legates. Historian Barbara Crawford thought that Thorulf was a Scandindavian, and a close associate of the earl. The Orkneyinga saga related that Birsay was the permanent residence of Earl Thorfinn, and that the earl built a minster there [dedicated to Christ] as the seat of the first Orkney bishop.

Although this specific claim may not be true [one previous bishop is known], it is nevertheless taken as evidence that Thorfinn's reign was a significant turning point for the earldom, suggesting according to historian Ronald Cant "a deliberate plan on the part of the earl to perfect the organization of the church in Orkney". Thorfinn and Thorulf's Christ Church has been identified with the Romanesque ruins on the tidal island known as Brough of Birsay, but there is also evidence that it was located over in the Mainland next to the Earl's palace.

== Notes ==
Religious titles
Unknown Title last held by Henry	Bishop of Orkney; 1043 x 1072 (perhaps c. 1050)	Succeeded by John
