= John I (bishop of Orkney) =

John (fl. 1043 x 1072) was an 11th-century prelate. According to the Saxon writer Adam of Bremen, historian of the archbishops of Hamburg, John was sent to Orkney by Adalbert, Archbishop of Hamburg, to succeed Thorulf as Bishop of Orkney. According to Adam, he had previously been consecrated as a bishop in "Scotland" (either Britain north of the Firth of Forth or Ireland).

Three other figures may or may not represent the same person as John. He is possibly the same bishop as the Jon Irski who had been bishop in Iceland for four years, around 1050. Another figure with a similar name, John Scotus (died 1066), was Bishop of the Obotrites and has thus likewise been connected with the Orkney bishop. Another John was mentioned by Hugh the Chanter's 12th-century History of the Church of York as a Bishop of Glasgow during the time of Cynesige, Archbishop of York (1051–1060).

Religious titles
Preceded by Thorulf	Bishop of Orkney; 1043 x 1072	Succeeded by Adalbert
