= Adalbert (bishop of Orkney) =

Adalbert (fl. 1043 x 1072) was an 11th-century prelate. Having been consecrated elsewhere, he is said by the Saxon writer Adam of Bremen to have been sent to become Bishop of Orkney by his namesake, Adalbert, Archbishop of Hamburg. He is mentioned as the successor of Bishop John.

Adam of Bremen relates that a cleric called Albert was established as the first bishop in Trondheim, an event datable to some point between 1067 and 1093. It is possible that Adalbert and Albert are the same person.

Religious titles
Preceded by John	Bishop of Orkney; 1043 x 1072	Succeeded by Radulf
