= Bishop of Orkney =

Head of the Scottish diocese, c. 1035–1688

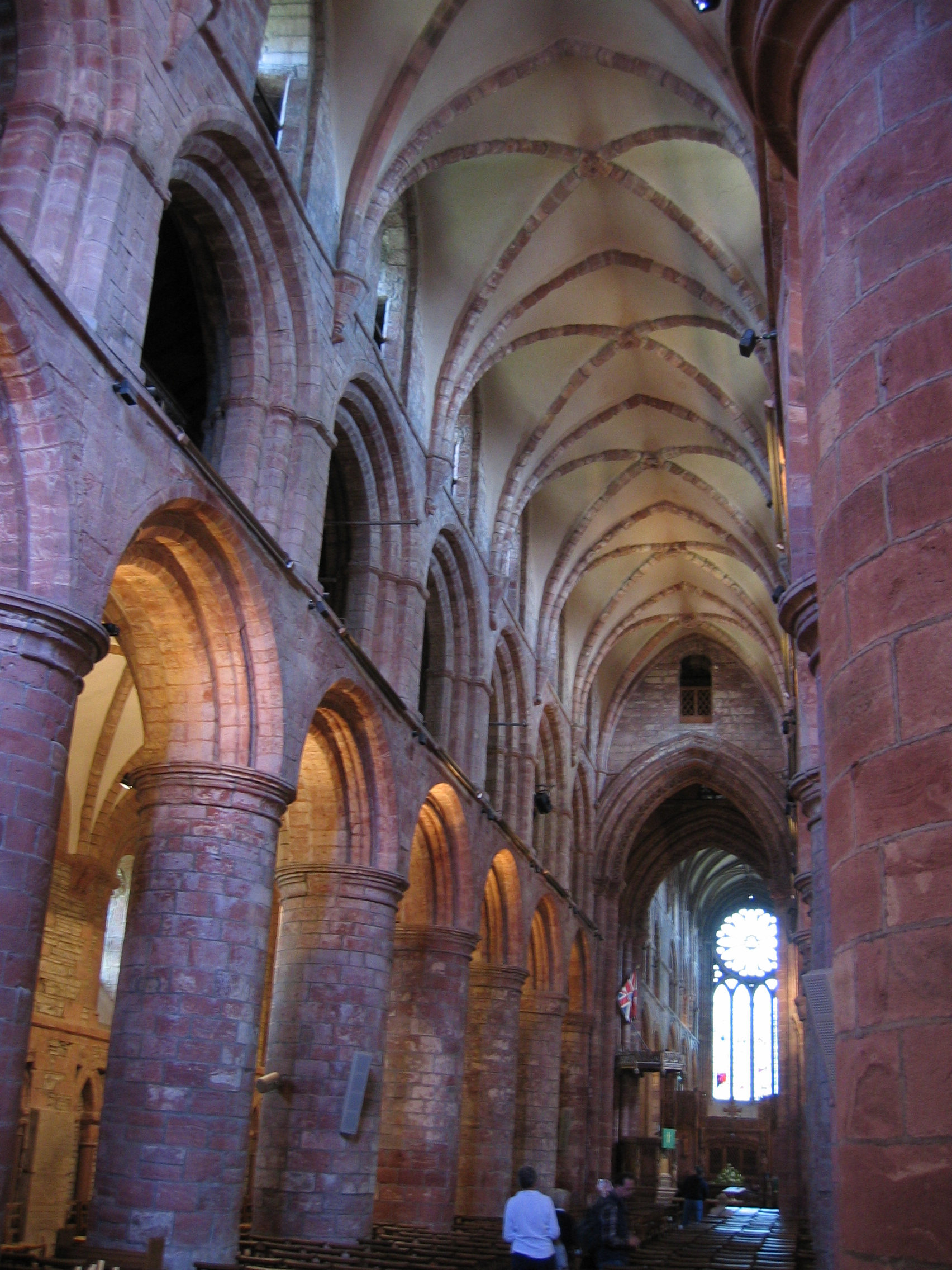
The Romanesque interior of St Magnus Cathedral, the seat of the bishops of Orkney

The Bishop of Orkney was the ecclesiastical head of the Diocese of Orkney, one of thirteen medieval bishoprics of Scotland. It included both Orkney and Shetland. It was based for almost all of its history at St Magnus Cathedral, Kirkwall.

The bishopric appears to have been suffragan of the Archbishop of York (with intermittent control exercised by the Archbishop of Hamburg-Bremen) until the creation of the Archbishopric of Trondheim (Niðaros) in 1152. Although Orkney itself did not unite with mainland Scotland until 1468, the Scottish kings and political community had been pushing for control of the islands for centuries. The see, however, remained under the nominal control of Trondheim until the creation of the Archbishopric of St Andrews in 1472, when it became for the first time an officially Scottish bishopric.

The Bishopric's links with Rome ceased to exist after the Scottish Reformation. The bishopric continued, saving temporary abolition between 1638 and 1661, under the episcopal Church of Scotland until the Glorious Revolution of 1688. Episcopacy in the established church in Scotland was permanently abolished in 1689, but a Scottish Episcopal Church bishopric encompassing Orkney was created in 1865, as the Bishopric of Aberdeen and Orkney. In 1878, the Catholic Church in Scotland re-established the bishopric system, and Orkney came under the resurrected and reformatted Diocese of Aberdeen.

== Parishes in the medieval period ==
=== Orkney ===
1. Birsay (Mainland)
2. Burness (Sanday)
3. Burray
4. Cross (Sanday)
5. Deerness (Mainland)
6. Eday
7. Egilsay
8. Evie (Mainland)
9. Firth (Mainland)
10. Flotta
11. Graemsay
12. Harray (Mainland)
13. Holm (& Pablay) (Mainland)
14. Hoy
15. Lady (Sanday)
16. Lady (Stronsay)
17. North Ronaldsay
18. Orphir (Mainland)
19. Papa Westray
20. Rendall (Mainland)
21. Rousay
22. Sandwick (Mainland)
23. Shapinsay
24. St Andrews (Mainland)
25. St Mary's (South Ronaldsay)
26. St Nicholas (Stronsay)
27. St Peter's (South Ronaldsay)
28. St Peter's (Stronsay)
29. Stenness (Mainland)
30. Stromness (Mainland)
31. Walls
32. Westray

=== Shetland ===
1. Aithsting (Mainland)
2. Baliasta (Unst)
3. Bressay
4. Burra
5. Cunningsburgh (Mainland)
6. Delting (Mainland)
7. Dunrossness (Mainland)
8. Fair Isle
9. Fetlar
10. Foula
11. Hillswick (Mainland)
12. Laxavoe (Mainland)
13. Lerwick (Mainland)
14. Lund (Unst)
15. Lunnasting (Mainland)
16. Nesting (Mainland)
17. Northmavine (Mainland)
18. Northrew (Mainland)
19. Norwick (Unst)
20. Ollaberry (Mainland)
21. Olnafirth (Mainland)
22. Papa Stour
23. Quarff (Mainland)
24. Sandness (Mainland)
25. Sandwick (Mainland)
26. Tingwall (Mainland)
27. Walls (Mainland)
28. Weisdale (Mainland)
29. Whalsay
30. Whiteness (Mainland)
31. Yell

== List of known bishops of Orkney ==
Bishops of Orkney
Tenure		Incumbent	Notes
From	Until	Incumbent	Notes
1035 (?)	?	Henry of Lund	Keeper of the treasury of King Cnut; probably the latter's appointee. Name unusual for an Englishman; may have been a German or a Frenchman.
fl. 1043–1072		Thorulf of Orkney	Sent as bishop by Archbishop Adalbert of Hamburg.
fl. 1043–1072		John (I)	Appointee of the Archbishop of Bremen. Perhaps the same as Johannes Scotus, bishop of Glasgow.
fl. 1043–1072		Adalbert	Sent as bishop to Iceland, Greenland and Orkney, by Adalbert, Archbishop of Hamburg.
fl. 1073		Radulf	
fl. 1100–1108		Roger	
1109	1114–1147	Radulf Novell	He was consecrated by Thomas, Archbishop of York. There is no evidence that Radulf ever took possession of his see, nor that he ever visited Orkney. Subordinate of the Archbishop of York. Served as the vicar of the Bishop of Durham.
c. 1112–1168		William the Old (I)	
1168	1188	William (II)	
1188	1194–1223	Bjarni Kolbeinsson Skald	
1223	1224–1246	Jofreyrr	Jofreyrr is Godfrey.
1247	1269	Henry/Hervi	
1270	1284	Peter	
1286	1309	Dolgfinnr	
1309	1339–1340	William (III)	
bef. 1369	1382–1383	William (IV)	
1384	1394	John (II)	The Roman bishop. He was elected by the cathedral chapter. His election was declared null and void by Pope Urban VI, but the latter provided him to the see in 1384. Pope Boniface IX translated him to the Bishopric of Garðar, Greenland.
1383	1391	Robert Sinclair	The Avignon bishop, in contrast to John, the candidate of the Roman Pope. The doubling of bishops was a product of the Western Schism. His election drew hesitancy from the Avignon Pope Clement VII, but had been confirmed by 27 January 1384. He was translated to the Bishopric of Dunkeld sometime before March 1391.
1394		Henry (II or III)	Second Roman bishop. Previously Bishop of Greenland, he exchanged bishoprics with Bishop John.
1396	1397–1418	John Pak	The third Roman bishop of the Western Schism. He had been a monk of Colchester. He appears as "Johannes Anglus, bishop of Orkney" in the Union Treaty of Kalmar.
1398	1407–1414	Alexander Vaus	Second Avignon bishop. Provided by Pope Benedict XIII, but was not consecrated within the canonical time. He was translated to the Bishopric of Caithness in 1414.
1415	1419	William Stephani	Third Avignon bishop, provided by Pope Benedict XIII. He was translated to the Bishopric of Dunblane in 1419.
1418	1461	Thomas Tulloch	Fourth Roman bishop. He was accepted by both sides after the recognition of the "Roman" Popes by the Scottish king.
1461	1477	William Tulloch	
1477	1503–1506	Andrew Pictoris	It is not known what Andrew's surname was. Scottish historians have assumed, wrongly, that he was a Scot called Painter. Andrew was German, and his illegitimate son was called Henry Phankouth.
1503–1506	1524–1525	Edward Stewart	Coadjutor since 1498–1500.
1523	1525–1526	John Benston	
1526	1540–1541	Robert Maxwell	
1541	1558	Robert Reid	O. Cist.
1559	1593	Adam Bothwell	He became a Protestant, and in 1568 exchanged the temporalities of the see (which went to Robert Stewart, 1st Earl of Orkney) for Holyrood Abbey. He died in 1593, still styling himself "Bischop of Orkney, Commendatair of Halyrudhous". He was an uncle of the mathematician John Napier.
1605	1615	James Law	Became Archbishop of Glasgow.
1615	1638	George Graham	Translated from Bishopric of Dunblane. Died 1643
1638	1638	Robert Baron	Unable to take up his position
1638	1662	Between 1638 and the Restoration, Episcopacy in Scotland was temporarily abolished.	
1662	1663	Thomas Sydserf	Translated from Bishopric of Galloway.
1664	1676	Andrew Honeyman or Honyman	
1677	1688	Murdoch MacKenzie	Translated from the Bishopric of Moray.
1688	1688	Andrew Bruce	Episcopacy abolished in Scotland. Bruce died in 1700.
