= H.O. Lange =

Danish librarian

Hans Osterfeld "H.O." Lange
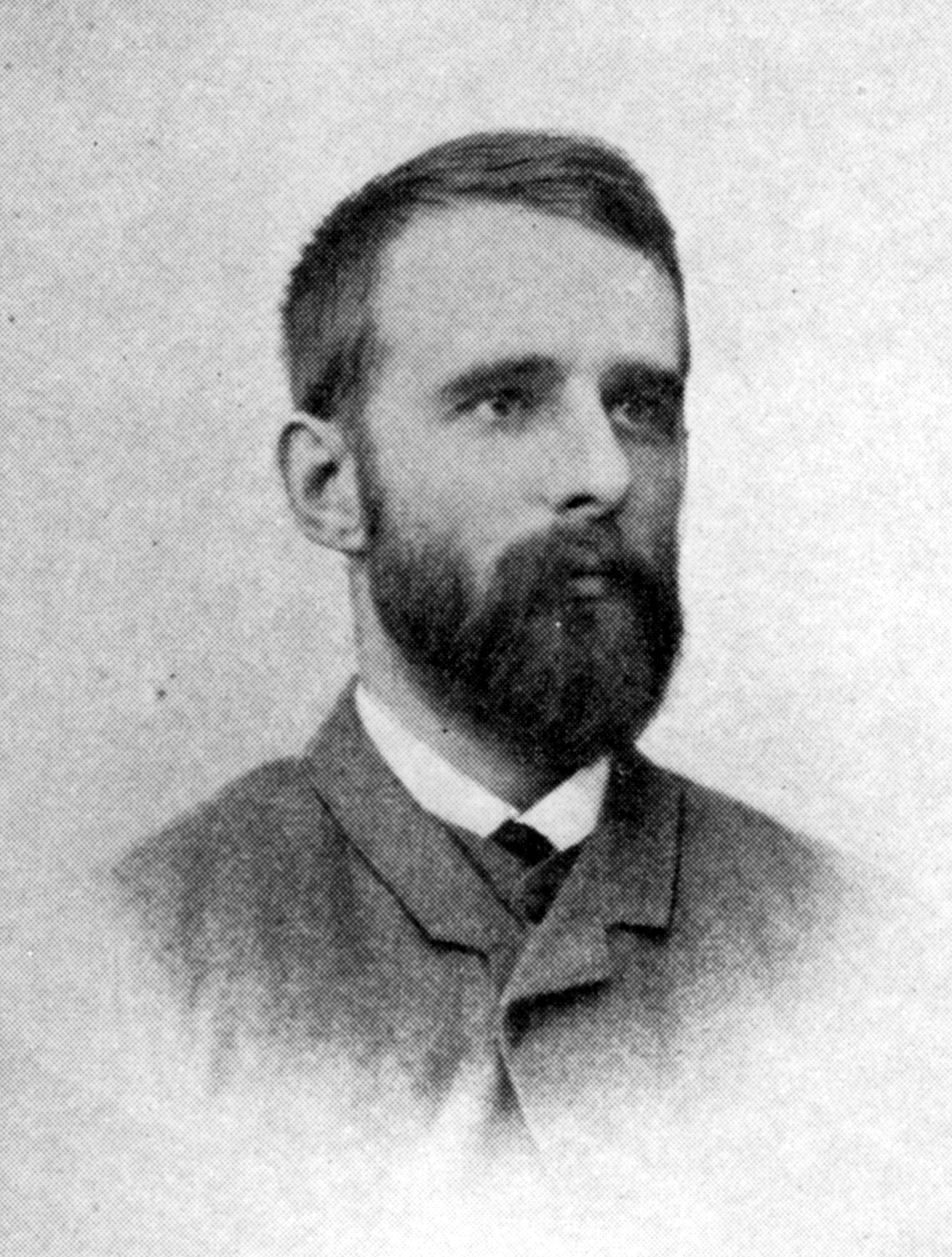
- Lange in 1892
- Born: 13 October 1863; Aarhus, Denmark
- Died: 15 January 1943 (aged 79); Gentofte, Denmark
- Education: University of Copenhagen
- Occupations: Librarian and Egyptologist
- Known for: Chief Librarian, Royal Library (1901-1924)

Hans Osterfeld "H.O." Lange (13 October 1863 – 15 January 1943) was a Danish librarian and egyptologist. He was chief librarian at the Royal Danish Library.

== Biography ==
Lange was born in Aarhus to Hans and Catherine Lange. He expressed interest in hieroglyphics as a young man. He graduated from Aarhus Cathedral School in 1881 and studied at the University of Copenhagen graduating in 1882. In 1883, he was hired at the Copenhagen University Library and in 1885 he joined the Royal Danish Library. From 1899 to 1900 he was employed at the Egyptian Museum in Cairo. He became Chief Librarian at the Royal Danish Library in 1901 and served in that role through 1924. He showed great interest in incunabula and increased the library's collection in that area during his tenure.

In 1918 he received an Honorary Doctorate from Lund University. In 1927 he became a member of the Prussian Academy of Sciences. In 1906 having become a knight in the Order of the Dannebrog. He also became a knight of the Order of Saint Olav. Since 2001, the Royal Library of Denmark has awarded an annual H.O. Lange Prize in his memory.

== Publications ==
- Danish Research Libraries Library Journal, v.29 (1904) p. 67-70

== Other sources ==
- P. Helweg-Larsen (1955) H.O. Lange. En Mindebog (København: P. Haase & Søns Forlag)
