= Egino (bishop of Dalby) =

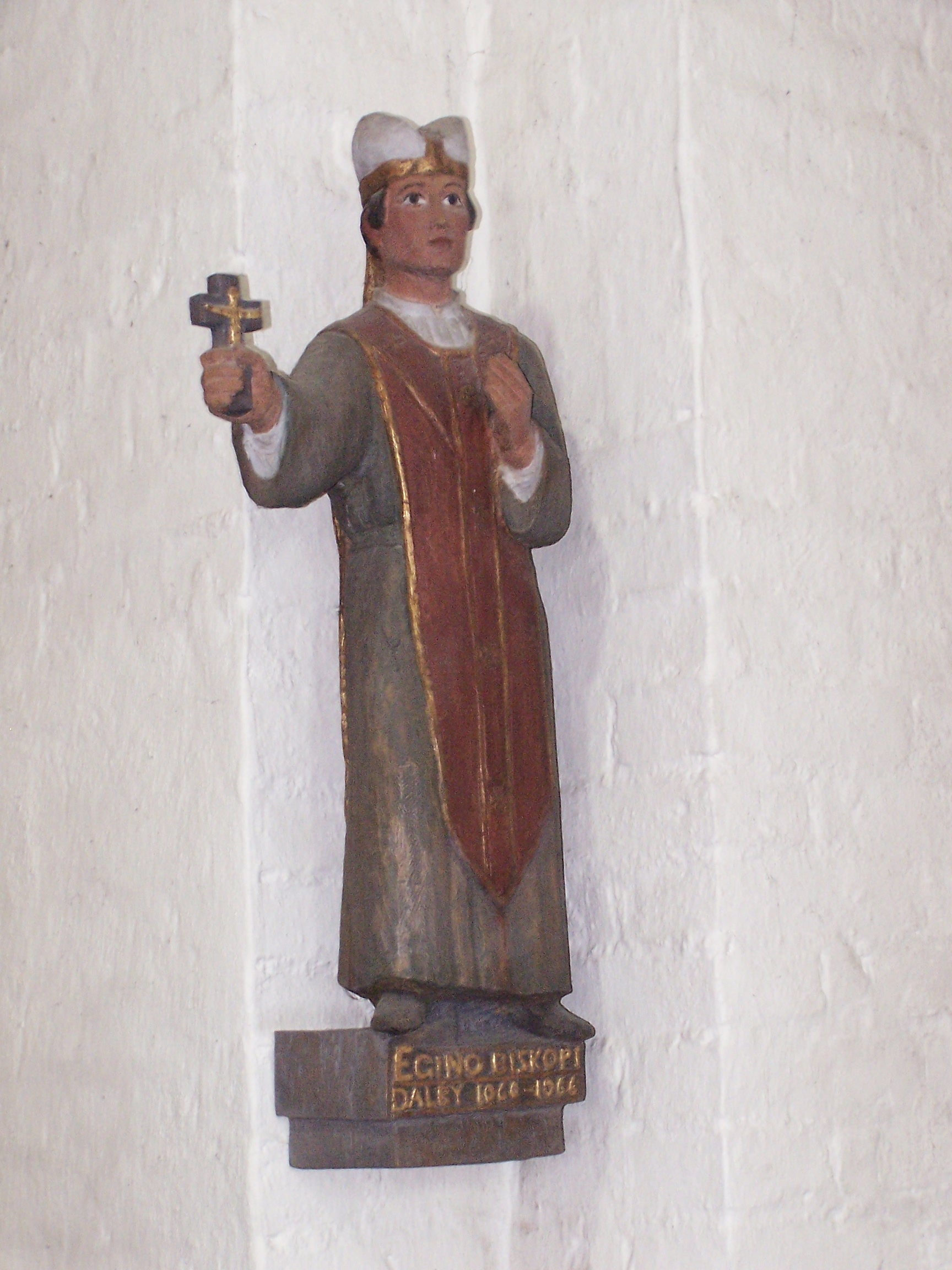
Sculpture of Egino in Dalby Church

Egino (died 1072) was the only bishop of Dalby in Scania, from 1060 to 1066. He was ordained by archbishop Adalbert of the Archbishopric of Bremen. The bishopric was separated from Roskilde in 1060, when the church in Denmark was reorganized in nine episcopal sees, but practically united with the see of Lund in 1066, after the death of bishop Henry of Lund. Thereby all of Terra Scania was subordinated to Hamburg-Bremen.

Egino probably initiated the erection of Dalby Church, perhaps the first stone church in Scandinavia, and is known to have visited Rome in 1071. Egino is also known as a successful missionary in Bornholm and Blekinge.
