= Fredrik Önnevall =

Swedish journalist and television presenter

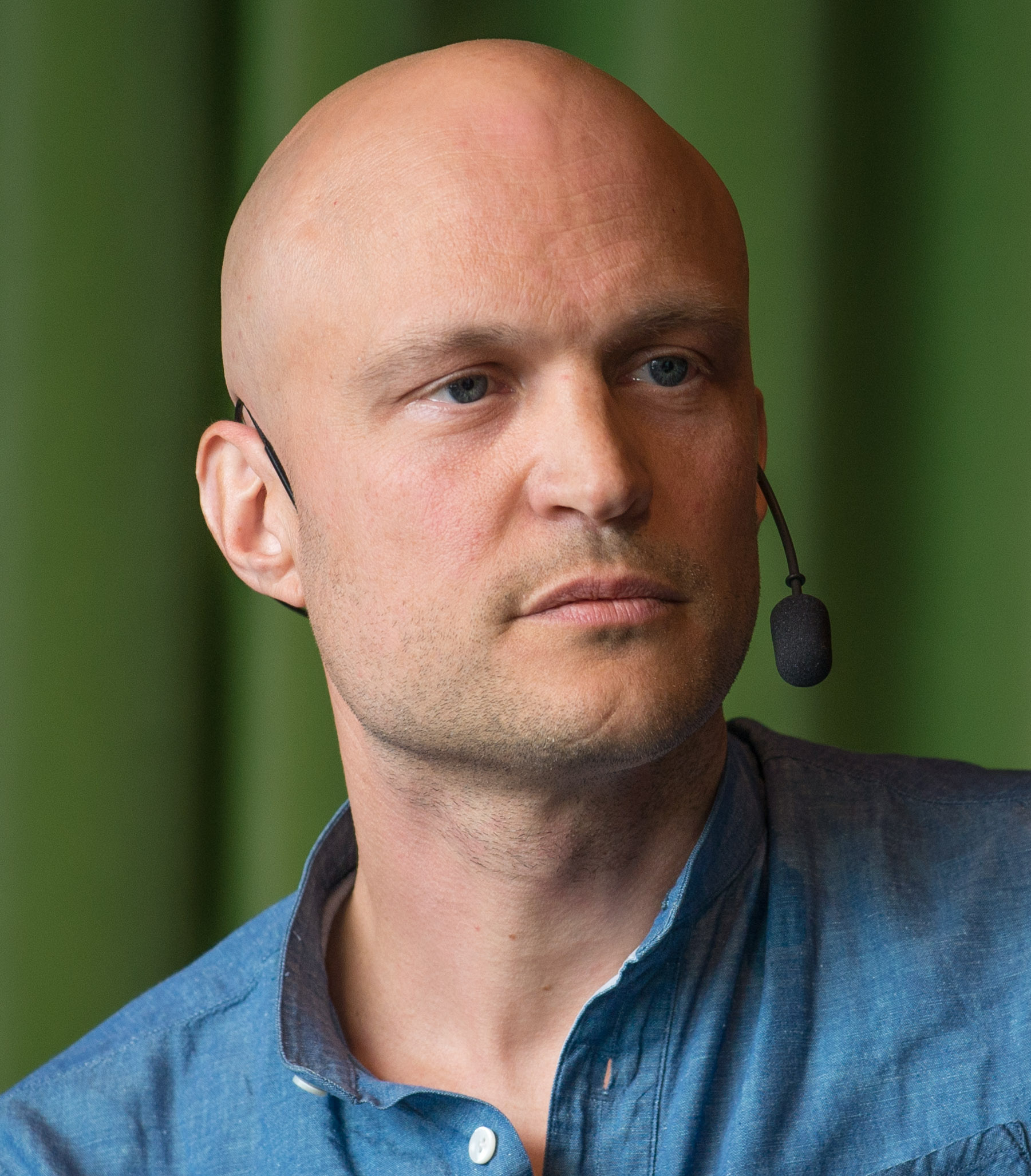
- Önnevall in 2015
- Born: Fredrik Önnevall; 1 November 1973 (age 52); Dalby, Sweden
- Occupations: Journalist, television presenter

Fredrik Önnevall (born 1 November 1973) is a Swedish journalist and television presenter. He speaks fluent Chinese and was Sveriges Television's first correspondent in Beijing between 2005 and 2008, and was their commentator there during the opening ceremony at the 2008 Summer Olympics. Önnevall has presented the Sveriges Television shows Kinas mat and Fosterland, which also focused on China. During the late 1990s he worked as a reporter and editor for the Sveriges Television local news show Sydnytt which covers news for the Skåne area.

== Career ==
Önnevall studied journalism at Södra Vätterbygdens folkhögskola, and worked at Sydnytt as a reporter and editor in the late 1990s. Between 2005 and 2008 he was Sveriges Television's first correspondent in Beijing. Earlier he studied in China and he speaks fluent Chinese. He has made documentaries for Packat & klart, and along with Jacob Hård he provided commentary for the 2008 Summer Olympics opening ceremony.

He presented the food show "Kinas mat" on Sveriges Television, in the show Önnevall travelled through provinces in China to learn more about the countries food culture. The show was broadcast in two seasons in 2010 and 2012 with eight episodes per season. He has as well presented "Korrespondenterna".

In early 2015, Önnevall was presenter for the show "Fosterland" on Sveriges Television, in the show he meets and interview nationalists in different countries, and targets of the nationalists. Season two of "Fosterland" started broadcasting on 13 January 2016.

During the filming of "Fosterland" a boy came up to Önnevall in Athens, Greece who was a refugee from Syria, he asked Önnevall and his film team if he could help him to get to Sweden where he had some relatives. Önnevall brought the boy with him smuggling him to Stockholm knowing that he dealt with illegal actions.

On 9 February 2017, Önnevall along with two SVT co-workers was convicted in Malmö court for human smuggling. The verdict was probation and 75 hours community service. The verdict was appealed and was set in higher court on 30 October 2017.

In late 2017, Önnevall presented the series "Bästa mannen", broadcast on Sveriges Television, where he travelled around Sweden interviewing men about how it is to be a man in today's society.
