= Dalby Norreskog =

Nature reserve in Sweden

Dalby Norreskog Nature Reserve
- IUCN category Ia (strict nature reserve)
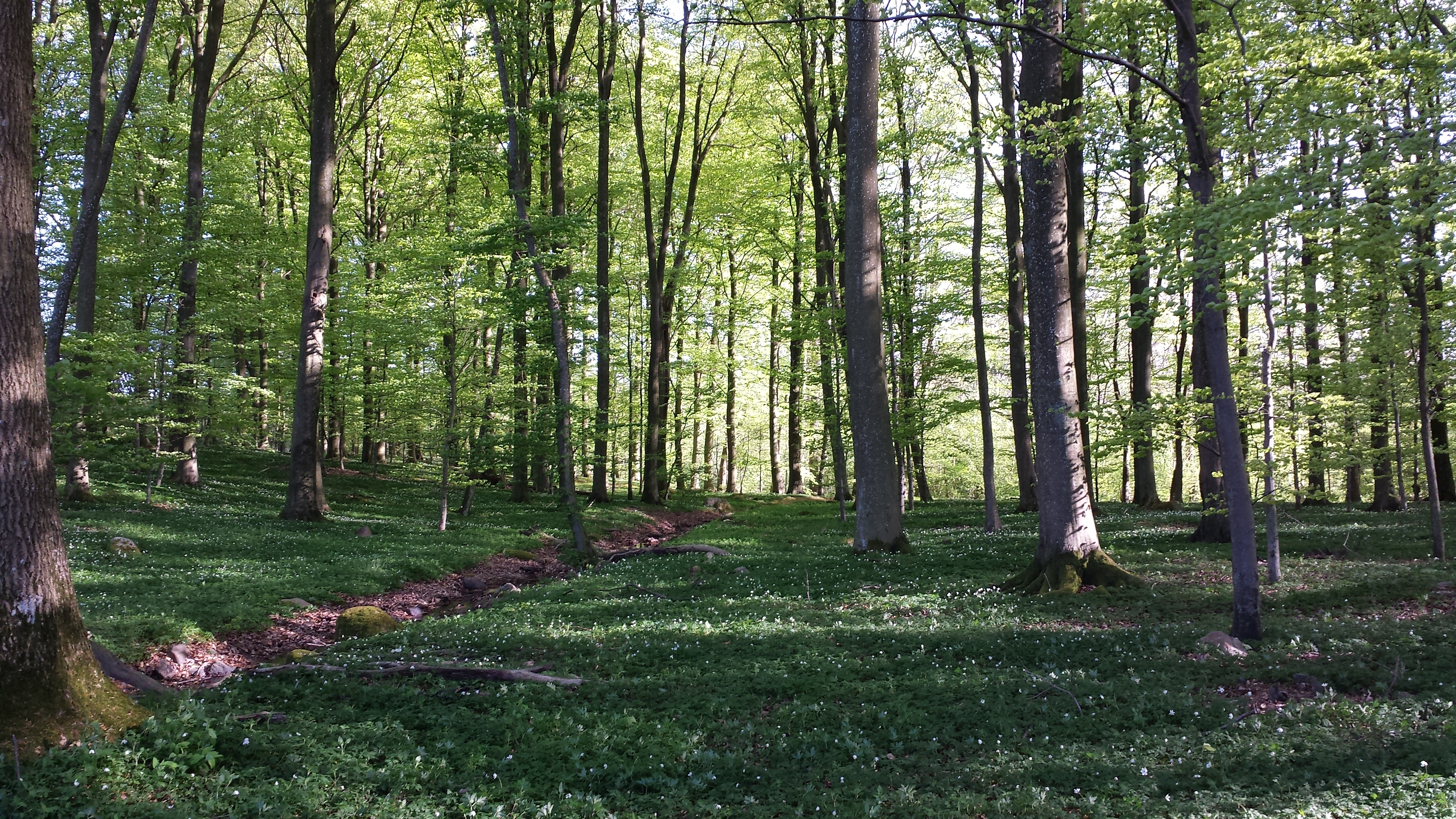
- Anemone nemorosa growing in Dalby Norreskog

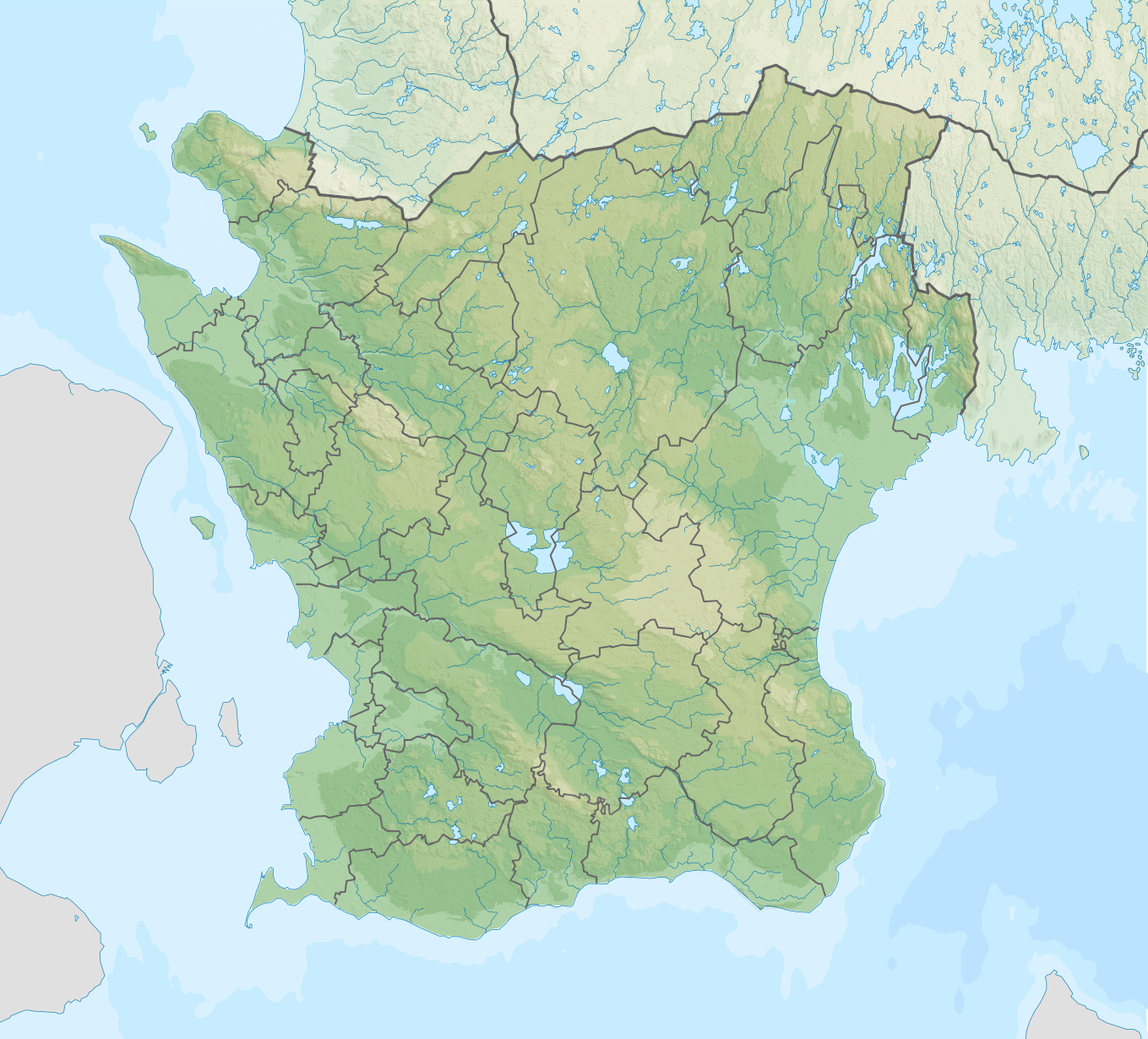
- Location within Skåne Location within Sweden
- Location: Skåne County
- Nearest city: Lund
- Coordinates: 55°41′N 13°20′E
- Area: 71.81 ha (177.4 acres)
- Operator: Skåne County

Dalby Norreskog is a nature reserve located close to Dalby and Lund in southern Sweden. It forms Dalby Hage together with Dalby Söderskog National Park. The name means the "northern forest", the Northwoods.
