= The Hamburg Bible =

Memory of the World inscription

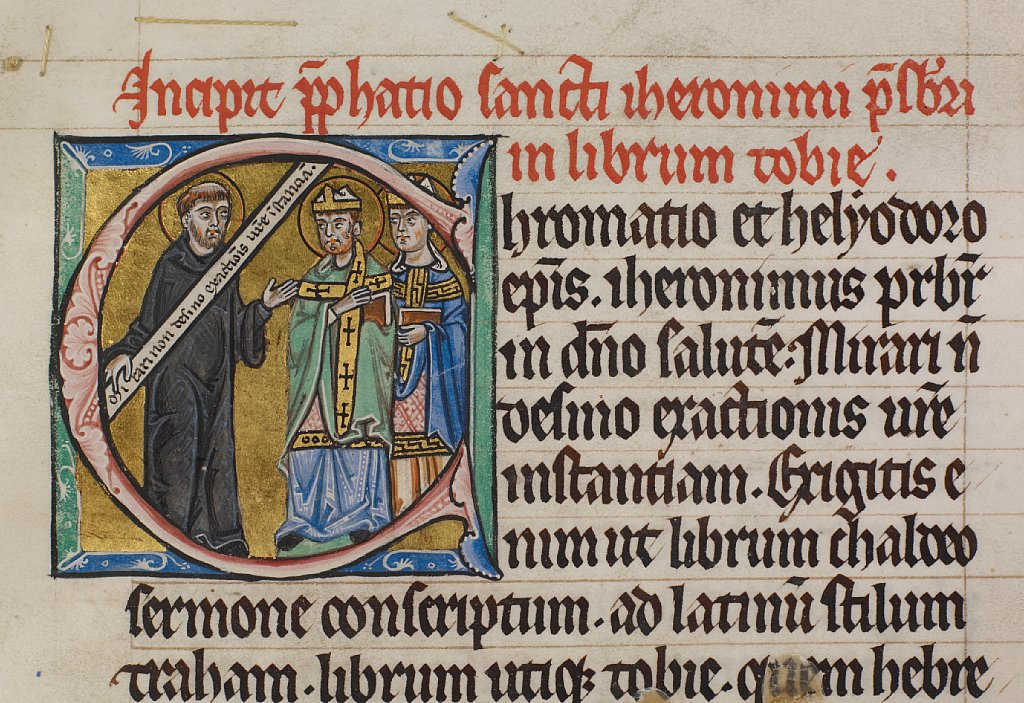
Hamburgbiblen - GKS 4-fol-II 21ra

The Hamburg Bible (also Biblia Latina or The Bible of Bertoldus) is a richly illuminated Latin Bible in three large volumes made for the Cathedral of Hamburg in 1255. It is presently in The Royal Library, Denmark and was inscribed in 2011 on UNESCO's Memory of the World International Register.

As a witness to the medieval book culture in Europe, The Hamburg Bible is a monument in its own right. It is the result of a small group of highly talented clergy- and craftsmen who not only exercised their skills to an extraordinary perfection, but also allowed themselves - or were allowed - to show their fascination of their own craft. The 89 illuminated initials contained in the three volumes illustrate themes of biblical books, with one illustrating the production of the medieval book, from the manufacturing of parchment at the beginning of the process to the illumination of initial letters when the work approached completion. The images are unique both as expressions of medieval art and as sources to the craft and history of the medieval book.

== History ==
The Hamburg Bible was made in 1255, by a scribe named Karolus, at the behest of Bertholdus, then the dean of Hamburg Cathedral. One calfskin was used to create the parchment - an illustration in folio 2 shows a layman handing parchment to Saint Jerome.

In 1784, the entire holdings of the Hamburg Cathedral Library were auctioned. The auction catalogue of this historic collection included 4,798 items. "Among the manuscripts was a Bible in three folio volumes according to Jerome's version, written on parchment in 1255." At this auction, the Danish Royal Library acquired the three-volume Latin Bible for 63 marks courant; since then it has been in Copenhagen.

== The volumes ==
=== Authorship ===
Karolus and Bertholdus are named in a dedication verse at the beginning of all three volumes as the scribe and commissioner of the work, respectively. However, the illustrator is uncredited, and their identity is unknown. Some pricked areas of the third volume appear to bear the remnants of signatures of the authors.

=== Materials ===
One calfskin was used to create each parchment bifolium of the manuscript. All of the quires in the three volumes were made of five parchment bifolia, with the exception of the last quire of the first volume, which has six bifolia, as the last one is blank and was pasted to the binding. The first volume consists of 242 folios, which in turn make up 24 quires, meaning this book used in total the skins of 121 animals. The second volume consists of 230 folios, coming to 23 quires from 115 animals. The number of folios in the third volume is less straightforward, since one folio between folios 53 and 54 is not numbered, while another folio between folios 79 and 80 was at some point cut away, and is now lost. This means that the third volume was originally composed of 220 folios (but officially only has 218 folios), using the skins of 110 animals.

The bindings of the books likely originate from the fourteenth century bindings recycled for the purposes of the bible. The corners show evidence of 3-5mm of trimming. In addition, some of the edges show evidence of the shape of the animal's skin that went unnoticed during the books' production.

=== Contents ===
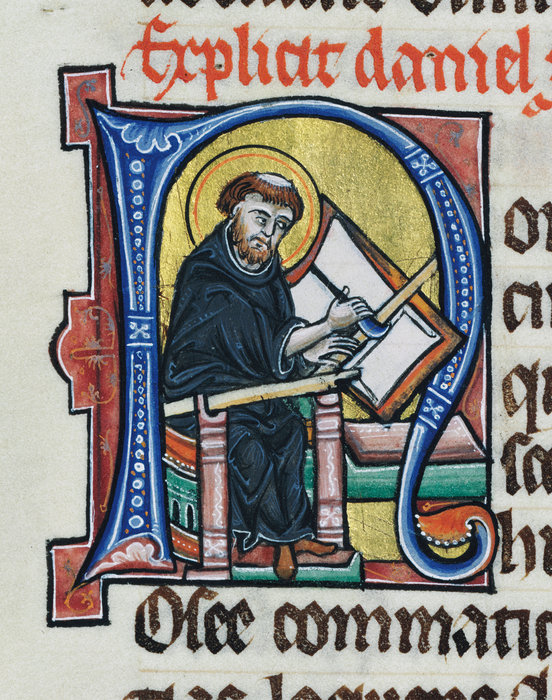
Jerome setting up and lining a page

There are 89 initia, which can be divided into two groups: illustrations of the biblical text and depictions of the various steps of book production. The fact that the book itself is the subject of its creation is rare in medieval book illumination. The illustrations depict the Church Father Jerome or the Apostle Paul performing the following activities:

band	Page	actor	Task
I	137vb	Jerome	Setting up and lining a page
II	38va	Jerome	Proofreading a finished page
II	183ra	Jerome	Purchasing from the parchment manufacturer
II	195ra	Jerome	Cropping the page
III	125ra	Paul	Writing with lined sheets
III	133vb	Paul	Writing with pen, knife and ink horn
III	142vb	Paul, Timothy	While Paul writes, Timothy prepares the next page.
III	165rb	Paul	Preparation of the writing work, with lined sheet, pen, knife and ink horn

The various portraits of authors, a common theme in book illumination and not unique to the Hamburg Bible, have been omitted from this overview. The realism with which the production steps of the book are depicted is unusual, however.

== Display ==
The Hamburg Bible has been shown to a wider audience at various special exhibitions in Denmark and abroad. It is available for research purposes in the Royal Library's high-security reading room. Due to the Bible's size and scope, digitization of the manuscript is a complex undertaking and was announced in 2011 for the coming years, with priority given to the illuminated pages.
