= Dalby hage =

Coordinates: 55°40′30″N 13°19′49″E

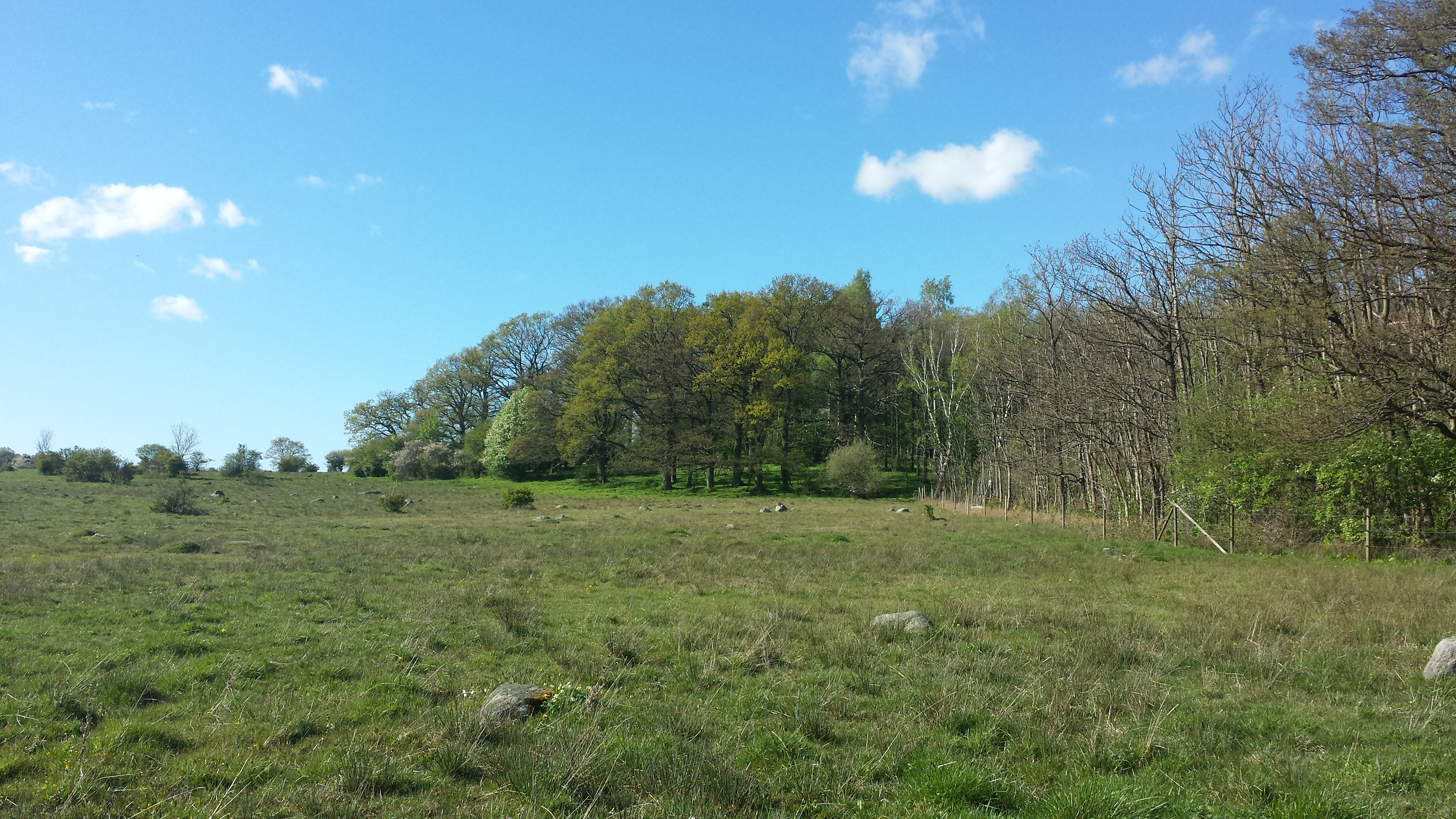
Standing in Hästhagen looking towards Dalby Norreskog

Dalby hage is an area located 10 km east of Lund in South Sweden. The area involves the two small forests Dalby Söderskog National Park and Dalby Norreskog. Between them is a pasture field Hästhagen which together with Dalby Norreskog forms a nature reserve.

In 1997 it was identified as a former royal deer park, probably from the 11th century and erected in connection with the royal place at Dalby. The park was as far back as the history can be traced, divided into three parts: The Northern and Southern forests with a flat pasture ground between them. Through this landscape is a rampart, which surrounds an area of app 18 ha. Inside the area was originally only a birch forest, while outside the rampart ash trees were abundant. Through the flat pasture flows a stream, which was dammed in two locations, providing water for the wild animals in the area.

Later historical sources tells us that the peasants belonging to the local manor (until the 16th century the local monastery which was erected in Dalby on top of the former royal palace) were obliged to fence the pasture as part of their corvee. In 1670 more than 6000 loads of brushwood were needed to maintain the fences of Dalby Hage. Measures of phosphate levels have also shown that their probably was a small settlement in the Northern part of the forest (a hunting lodge?). Finally local topographic names refer to locations were deer may be found (Hjortarummet and Hjortasulan). It is in this connection probably pertinent that most crafts in the nearby city of Lund until the mid 12th century were made entirely of antlers from red deer. Since red deer antlers are eaten up as soon as a deer dies naturally, the horn must have been a by-product of hunting. and
