= Dalby Söderskog National Park =

National park in Sweden

- Dalby Söderskogs nationalpark
- IUCN category II (national park)
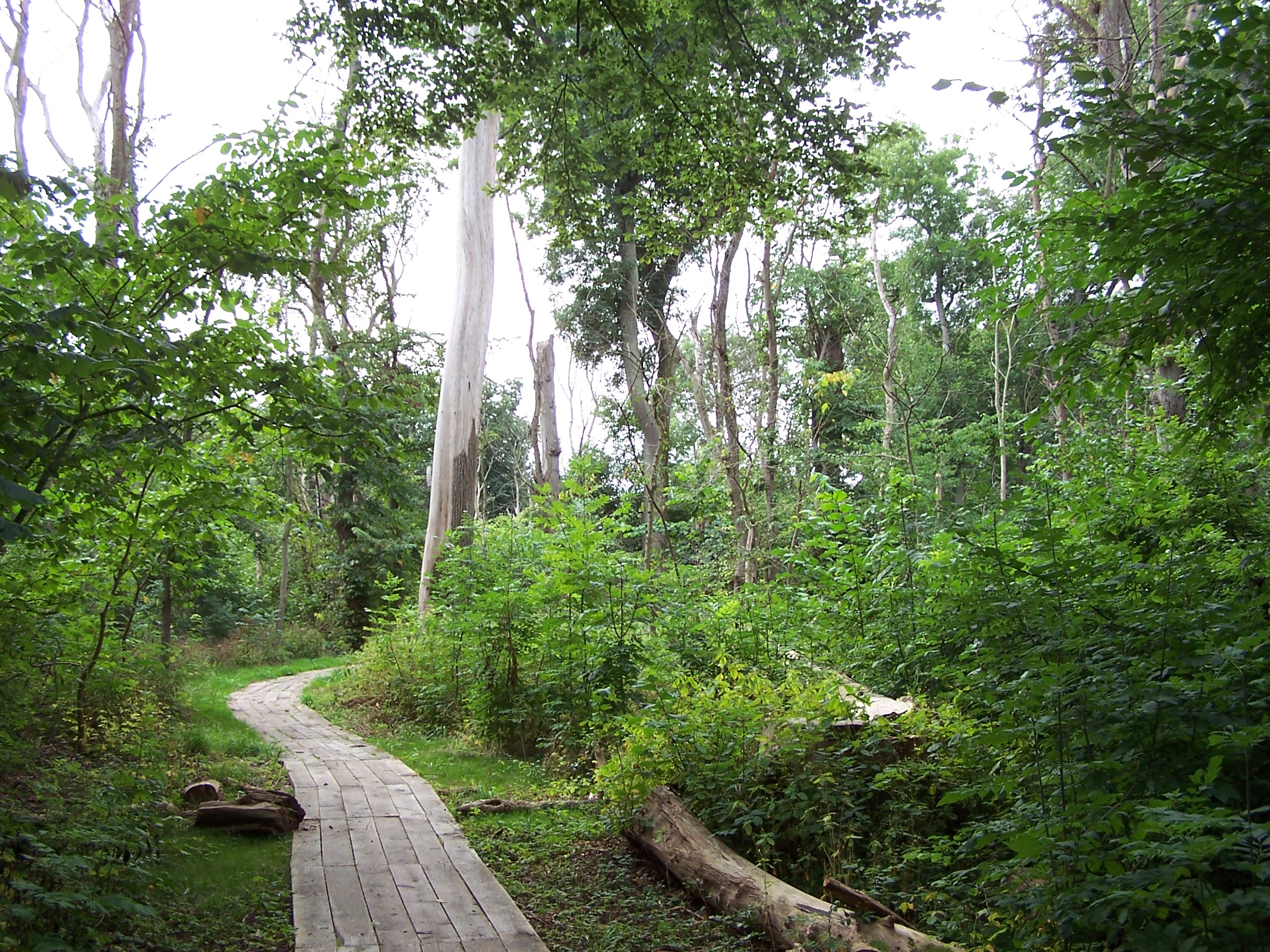
- Interactive map of Dalby Söderskog National Park
- Location: Skåne County, Sweden
- Nearest city: Lund
- Coordinates: 55°40′N 13°19′E
- Area: 0.36 km^{2} (0.14 sq mi)
- Established: 1918
- Governing body: Naturvårdsverket

National parks of Sweden (clickable map)

Dalby Söderskog (literally Dalby South Forest) is a small national park in the province of Scania in southern Sweden, situated in the municipality of Lund, near Dalby. It has an area of 0.36 km^{2} (0.14 mi^{2}) and consists of broadleaf forest. It was established in 1918, when it was thought to be a unique remnant of primeval forest. In fact, the area has previously been used for pasture. The ground contains much limestone and chalk, which makes the flora rich. In particular, there are many spring flowers. An earth bank of unknown origin, possibly the ruins of an ancient fort, surrounds parts of the park. The national park encompasses the southern part of Dalby hage, while the northern parts (Dalby Norreskog and Hästhagen) form a nature reserve.
