= Henry of Lund =

Henry was an 11th-century bishop and Christian missionary. He was probably the keeper of the treasury of King Canute the Great in England. Sometime before the year 1035, according to Adam of Bremen, Henry went to Orkney as bishop. As Bishop of Orkney, he was probably more of a missionary bishop, and may have been under the metropolitan authority of the Archbishop of York. He is possibly the Henry who went to Iceland for two undatable years. In either 1060 or 1061, the King of Denmark, Sweyn II, appointed him Bishop of Lund. He is the first man known to have held the bishopric of Lund, as well as Orkney. He is said to have died from an alcoholic episode sometime in the mid-1060s.

Religious titles
Preceded by -	Bishop of Orkney x 1035	Succeeded by Thorulf
Preceded by -	Bishop of Lund c. 1060–x 1066	Succeeded by Egino
