= Royal Library, Denmark =

National library of Denmark

Coordinates: 55°40′25.77″N 12°34′55.95″E

The Royal Library, the National Library of Denmark and the Copenhagen University Library
- Det Kongelige Bibliotek, Danmarks Nationalbibliotek og Københavns Universitetsbibliotek
- The Black Diamond building, viewed from the east
- Location: Copenhagen, Denmark
- Type: National library, university library
- Scope: National Library of Denmark - Main library of the University of Copenhagen - Danish Museum of Books and Printing, National Museum of Photography, Museum of Danish Cartoon Art.
- Established: 1648 (378 years ago) (University Library founded 1482)
- Reference to legal mandate: No special law. The obligations of the library are stated in the annual state budget

Collection
- Size: 36,975,069 physical volumes, 2,438,978 electronic titles (as of 2017)
- Legal deposit: Since 1697

Other information
- Chief executive: Bente Skovgaard Kristensen
- Website: kb.dk

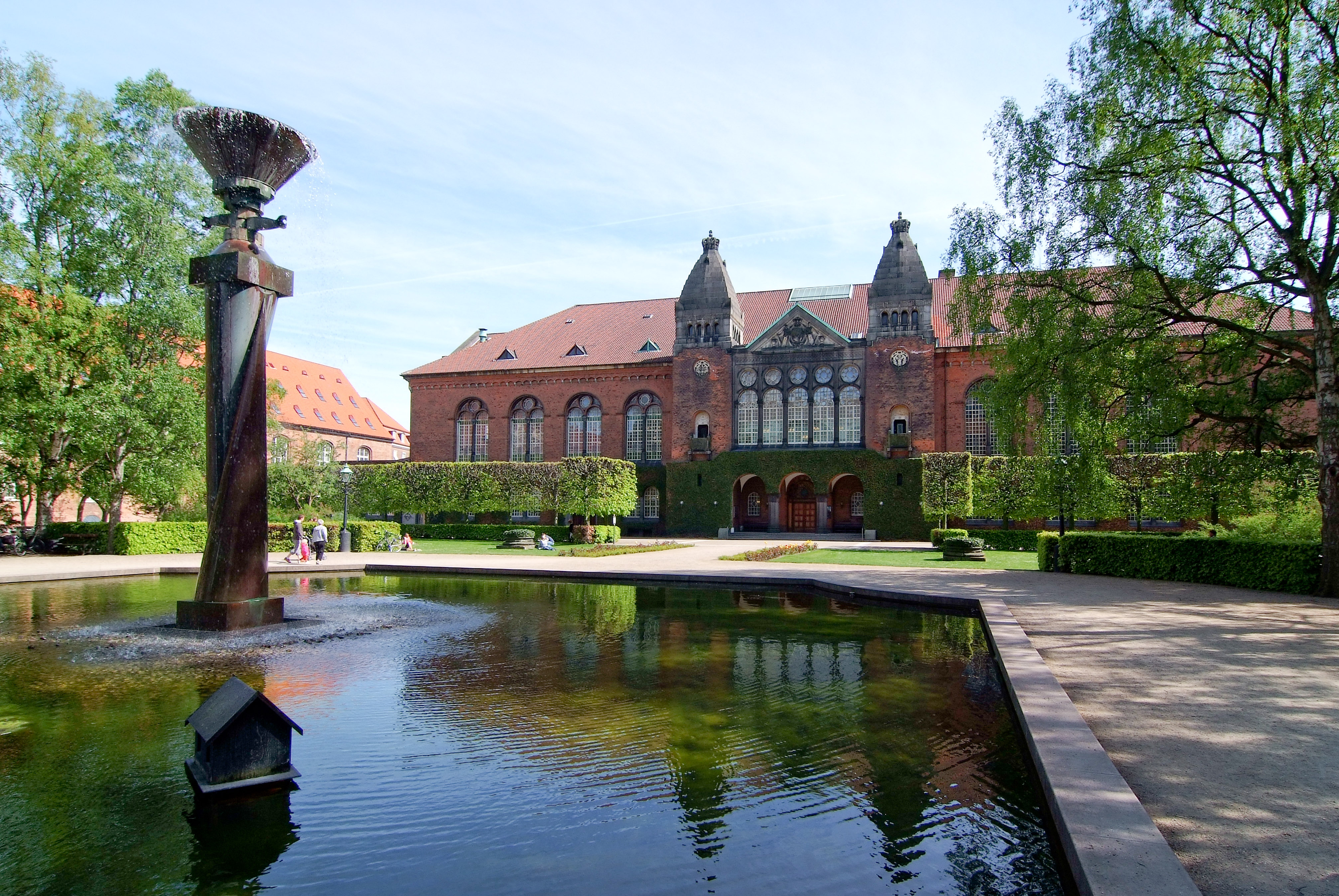
The building of the Royal Library, Denmark, on Slotsholmen, which dates to 1906, viewed from the northwest

The Royal Library (Danish: Det Kongelige Bibliotek) in Copenhagen is the national library of Denmark and the academic library of the University of Copenhagen. It is among the largest libraries in the world and the largest in the Nordic countries. In 2017, it merged with the State and University Library in Aarhus to form a combined national library. The combined library organisation (the separate library locations in Copenhagen and Aarhus are maintained) is known as the Royal Danish Library (Danish: Det Kgl. Bibliotek).

It contains numerous historical treasures, and a copy of all works printed in Denmark since the 17th century are deposited there. Thanks to extensive donations in the past, the library holds nearly all known Danish printed works back to and including the first Danish books, printed in 1482 by Johann Snell.

== History ==
The library was founded in 1648 by King Frederik III, who contributed a comprehensive collection of European works. It was opened to the public in 1793.

In 1989, it was merged with the prestigious Copenhagen University Library (founded in 1482) (UB1). In 2005, it was merged with the Danish National Library for Science and Medicine (UB2), now the Faculty Library of Natural and Health Sciences. The official name of the organization as of 1 January 2006 is The Royal Library, the National Library of Denmark and the Copenhagen University Library. In 2008, the Danish Folklore Archive was merged with the Royal Library.

=== Librarians ===
The first librarian was Marcus Meibom, followed 1663-1671 by Peder Griffenfeld. Later librarians included J. H. Schlegel, Jon Erichsen, Daniel Gotthilf Moldenhawer (1787–1823 notorious for stealing numerous books to enrich the library collections) and Chr. Bruun. Since 1900 the former librarians are H.O. Lange (1901–1924), Carl S. Petersen (1924–1943), Svend Dahl (1943–1952), Palle Birkelund (1952–1982), Torkil Olsen (1982–1986), Erland Kolding Nielsen (1986–2017), followed by Svend Larsen, and currently Bente Skovgaard Kristensen.

=== Book theft in the 1970s ===
In the 1970s, the library saw the largest book theft in Danish history, with the case only being resolved in 2003. Almost 3,200 works (books and similar), mostly antiques, were stolen from the library by an employee. Most have since been recovered, but a few hundred remain missing.

== Items collected ==
Books, journals, newspapers, pamphlets and corporate publications, manuscripts and archives, maps, prints and photographs, music scores, documentation of folkways and popular traditions, games, and four annual electronic copies of the Danish Internet by legal deposit.

As of 2017, the Royal Library held 36,975,069 physical volumes and 2,438,978 electronic titles. The online catalogue, in combination with the reading room, is still patrons' most direct form of access to the collections.

== The Royal Library today ==
Today, The Royal Library has five sites: The main library at Slotsholmen, Copenhagen harbour (in the Black Diamond), covering all subjects and special collections; one at Nørre Alle, Faculty Library of Natural and Health Sciences; one at Gothersgade, central Copenhagen, Faculty Library of Social Sciences; one at Amager, Faculty Library of Humanities; and, one in Studiestræde, central Copenhagen, The Faculty of Law Library. The annual circulation is 11,400,000 loans (10,900,000 of these are electronic loans). The members are 32,196 active users. The annual budget: 394M Danish Kroner (58M US Dollars), including building expenses and maintenance.

The library is open to anyone above the age of 18 with a genuine need to use the collections. Special rules apply for use of rare and valuable items.

== Buildings at the Slotsholmen site ==
The old building of the Slotsholmen site was built in 1906 by Hans Jørgen Holm. The central hall is a copy of Charlemagne's Palace chapel in the Aachen Cathedral. The building is still being used by the library.

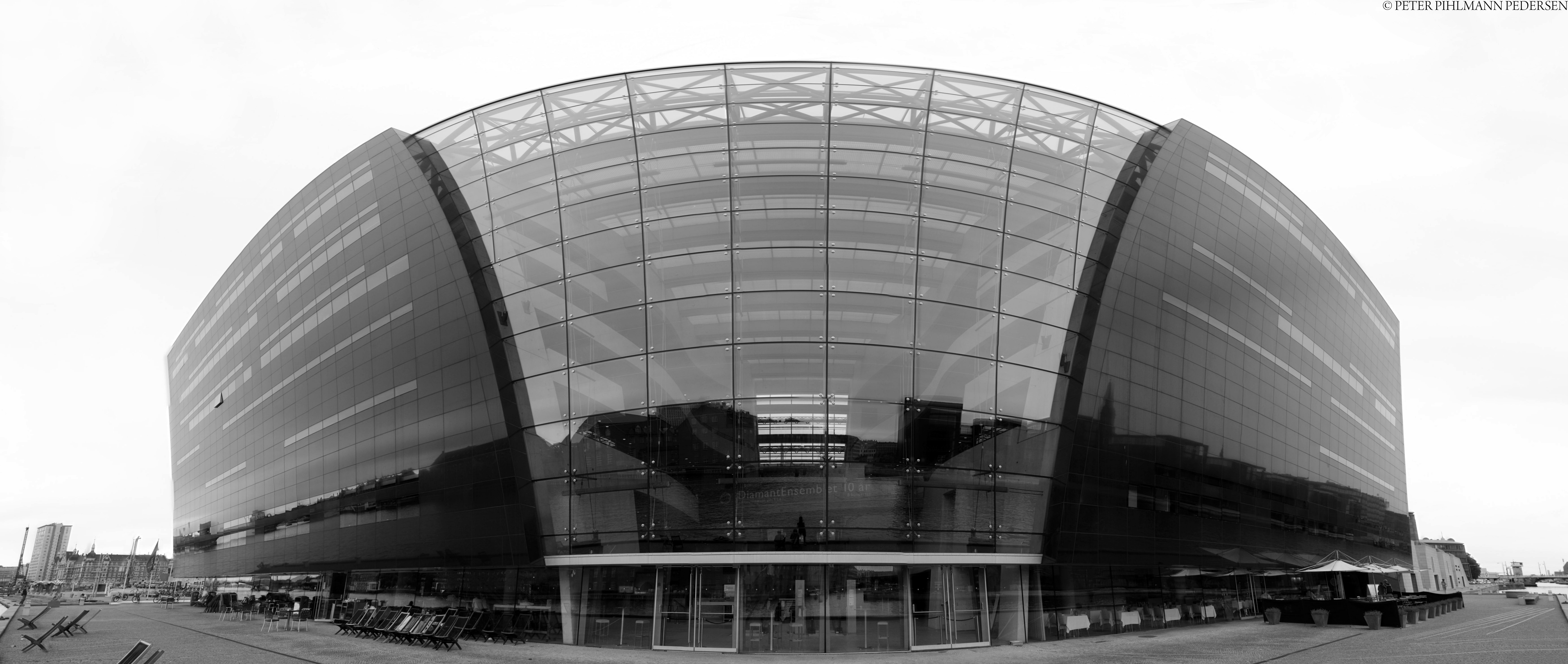
Panoramic view of the new building opened in 1999 (taken by Peter Pihlmann Pedersen, 2013)

In 1999, a new building adjacent to the old one was opened at Slotsholmen, known as the Black Diamond. The Black Diamond building was designed by Danish architects schmidt hammer lassen. Named for its outside cover of black marble and glass, the Black Diamond building houses a concert hall in addition to the library.

The Black Diamond is formed by two black cubes that are slightly tilted over the street. In between, there is an eight-storey atrium whose walls are white and wave-shaped, with a couple of transversal corridors that link both sides, and balconies on every floor. The atrium's exterior wall is made of glass; so, you can see the sea; and, on the opposite shore, you can see Christianshavn's luxury buildings.

Three bridges connect the Black Diamond with the old part of the Royal Library; those three bridges (two small ones for internal transport and a big one with the circulation desk) go over the road. At the ceiling of the big bridge, there is a huge painting by Danish painter Per Kirkeby.

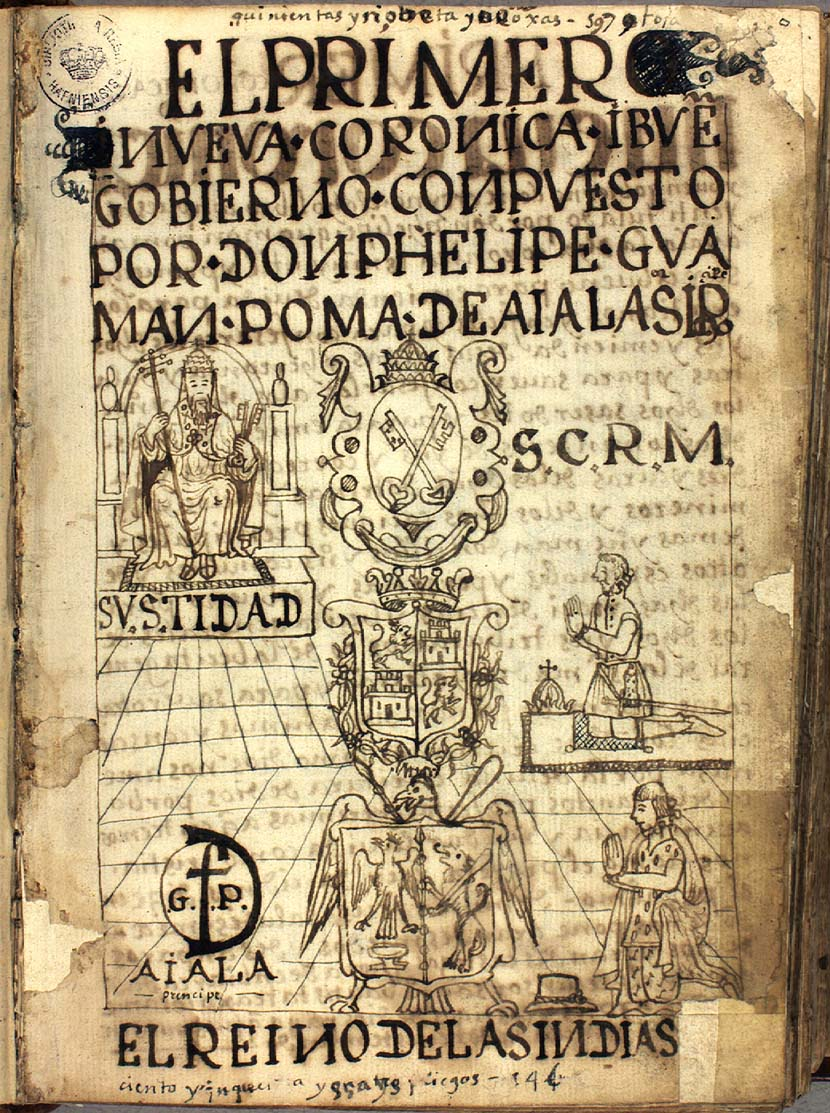
First page of the Primer nueva corónica y buen gobierno of Guamán Poma de Ayala

== Significant holdings ==
The Royal Library acquires Danish books through legal deposit. The holdings include an almost complete collection of all Danish printed books back from 1482. In 2006, legal deposit was extended to electronic publications and now the library harvests four electronic copies of the Danish Internet each year. Danish books printed before 1900 are digitized on demand and made freely available to the public. As the National library, RDL has vast collections of digital material (Danish net archive, digitized radio and TV and newspapers etc.) which are relevant for scholars in many fields. The library also holds a large and significant collection of old foreign scholarly and scientific literature, including precious books of high value and of importance for book history, including a rare copy of the Gutenberg Bible.

The library holds treasures which are inscribed on UNESCO's Memory of the World International Register: A collection of about 2,000 books by and about Carl Linné (1997); the manuscripts and correspondence of Hans Christian Andersen (1997); the Søren Kierkegaard Archives (manuscripts and personal papers) (1997); Guamán Poma de Ayala's El Primer Nueva Coronica y Buen Gobierno, an autographed manuscript of 1,200 pages including 400 full-page drawings depicting the indigenous point of view on pre-conquest Andean life and Inca rule, the Spanish conquest in 1532, early Spanish colonial rule, and the systematic abuse of the rights of the indigenous population (2007). Biblia Latina. Commonly called the Hamburg Bible or the Bible of Bertoldus (MS. GKS 4 2°), a richly illuminated Bible in three very large volumes made for the Cathedral of Hamburg in 1255. The 89 illuminated initials in the book are unique both as expressions of medieval art and as sources to the craft and history of the medieval book. (2011);

Other treasures are the Copenhagen Psalter, the Dalby Gospel Book, the Angers fragment (parts of Denmark's first national chronicle), and maps of the Polar Region. The library also holds important collections of Icelandic manuscripts, primarily in Den gamle kongelige samling (The Old Royal Collection) and Den nye kongelige samling (The New Royal Collection). Denmark's most outstanding Icelandic collection, the Arnamagnæan Manuscript Collection, is however not a holding of The Royal Library but of the University of Copenhagen.

In 2010, the library acquired the 14th-century Courtenay Compendium at auction.

== See also ==
- Royal Library Garden, Copenhagen
- List of libraries in Denmark
