= Dalby, Lund Municipality =

Dalby
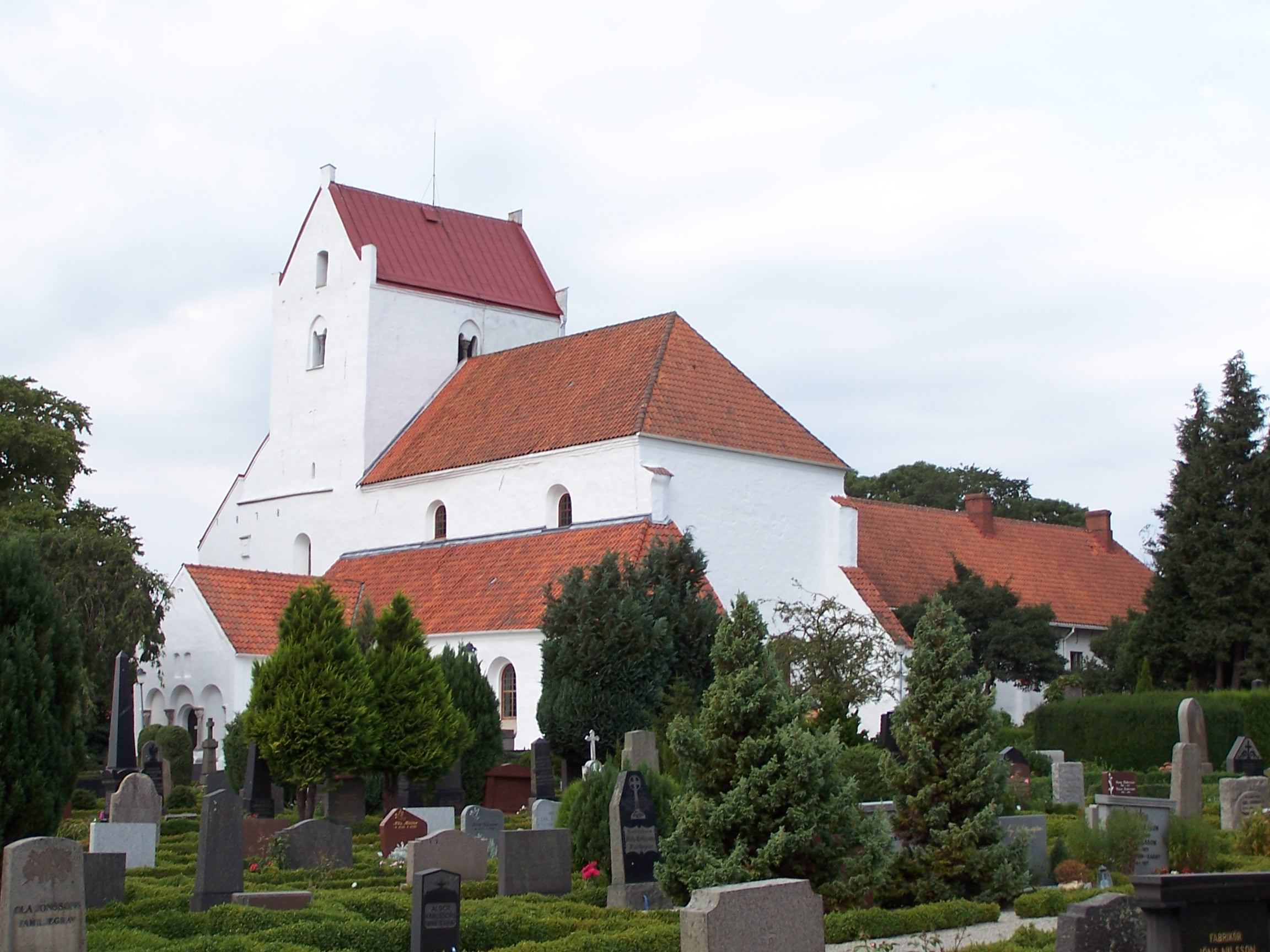
- Dalby

- Location within Skåne Location within Sweden
- Coordinates: 55°40′N 13°21′E
- Country: Sweden
- Province: Skåne
- County: Skåne County
- Municipality: Lund Municipality

Area
  - Total: 4.14 km^{2} (1.60 sq mi)

Population (2019)
  - Total: 6,732
  - Density: 1,626/km^{2} (4,210/sq mi)
- Time zone: UTC+1 (CET)
  - Summer (DST): UTC+2 (CEST)

Dalby is a locality and short-lived (11th century) former Latin Catholic diocese situated in Lund Municipality, Skåne County, Sweden with 6732 inhabitants in 2019. It is located about 10 km East-southeast of Lund, and about 20 km East-northeast of Malmö.

Dalby was a municipality up until 1974, when it became part of Lund municipality. Between 1941 and 1954, Dalby was also a municipal urban area ("municipalsamhälle").

The Dalby Söderskog national park is situated just northwest of Dalby.

The old quarry Stenbrottet is located a couple of kilometres east of Dalby. It's a popular place for swimming and fishing and for couples to become engaged.

== Bishopric ==
Dalby Church is one of the oldest stone churches in Scandinavia, for which the cathedral in Hildesheim served as a model. In 1060 the Danish King Svend Estridsen initiated the creation of a religious centre in Dalby, and possibly also constructed his royal residence there.

From 1060, Dalby was a bishopric, on territory split off from the Roman Catholic Diocese of Roskilde, under the bishop Egino, appointed by the German Archbishop Adalbert of Bremen. But as early as 1066 the English anti-bishop Henrik was enthroned in Lund, probably elected by the people and the clergy. In 1085 Canute the Saint decided to build a new cathedral in Lund and in 1104 Lund became the archbishopric over Scandinavia.

Another source holds the diocese was established in 1048 and suppressed in 1060.

Until the Protestant Reformation in Denmark in 1536, Dalby retained some importance as the site of an Augustinian monastery and a demesne of the Danish Crown.

== Notable people ==
- Nils Grandelius, chess grandmaster
- Fredrik Önnevall, journalist.

== Gallery ==
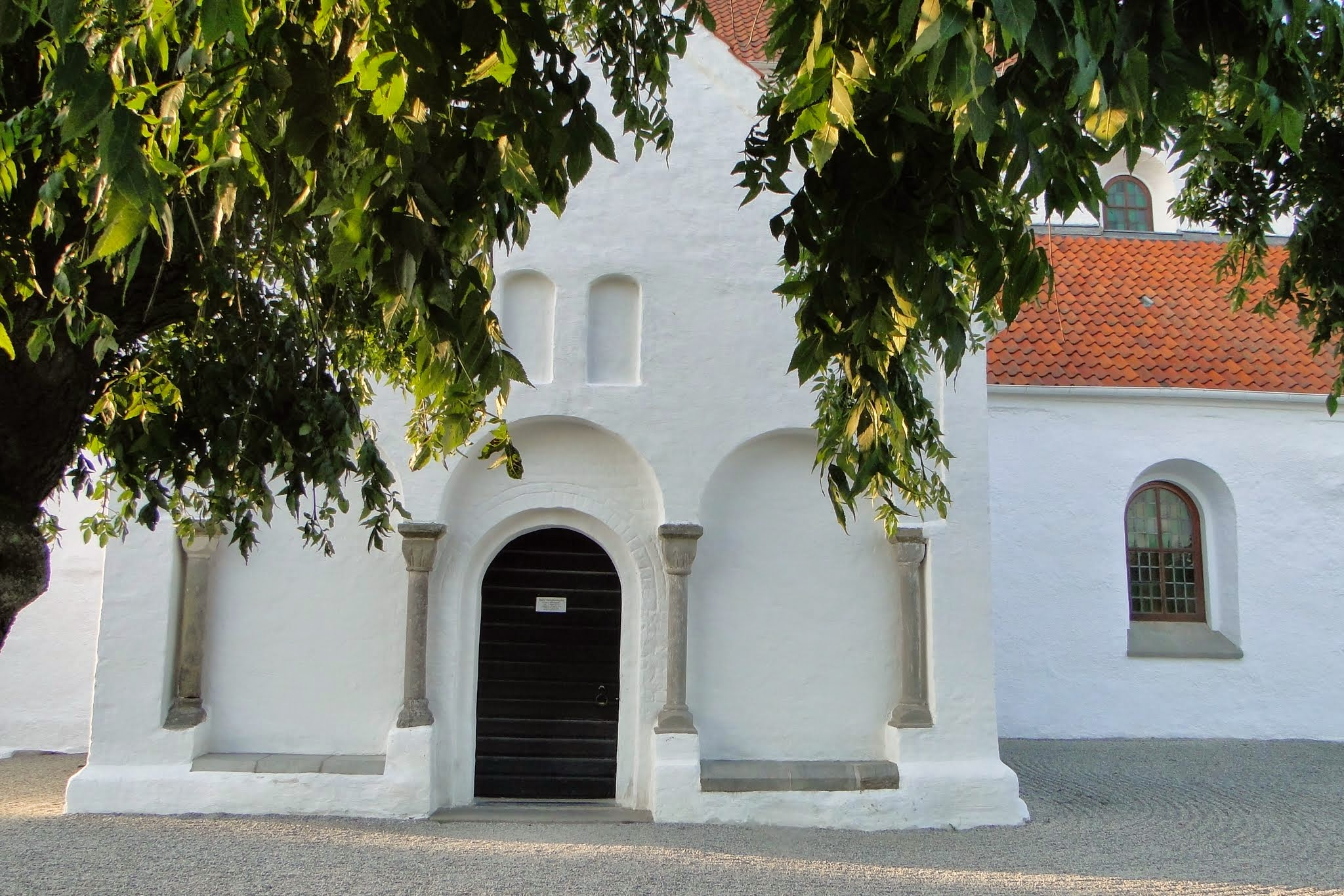
The entrance to the Holy Cross Church

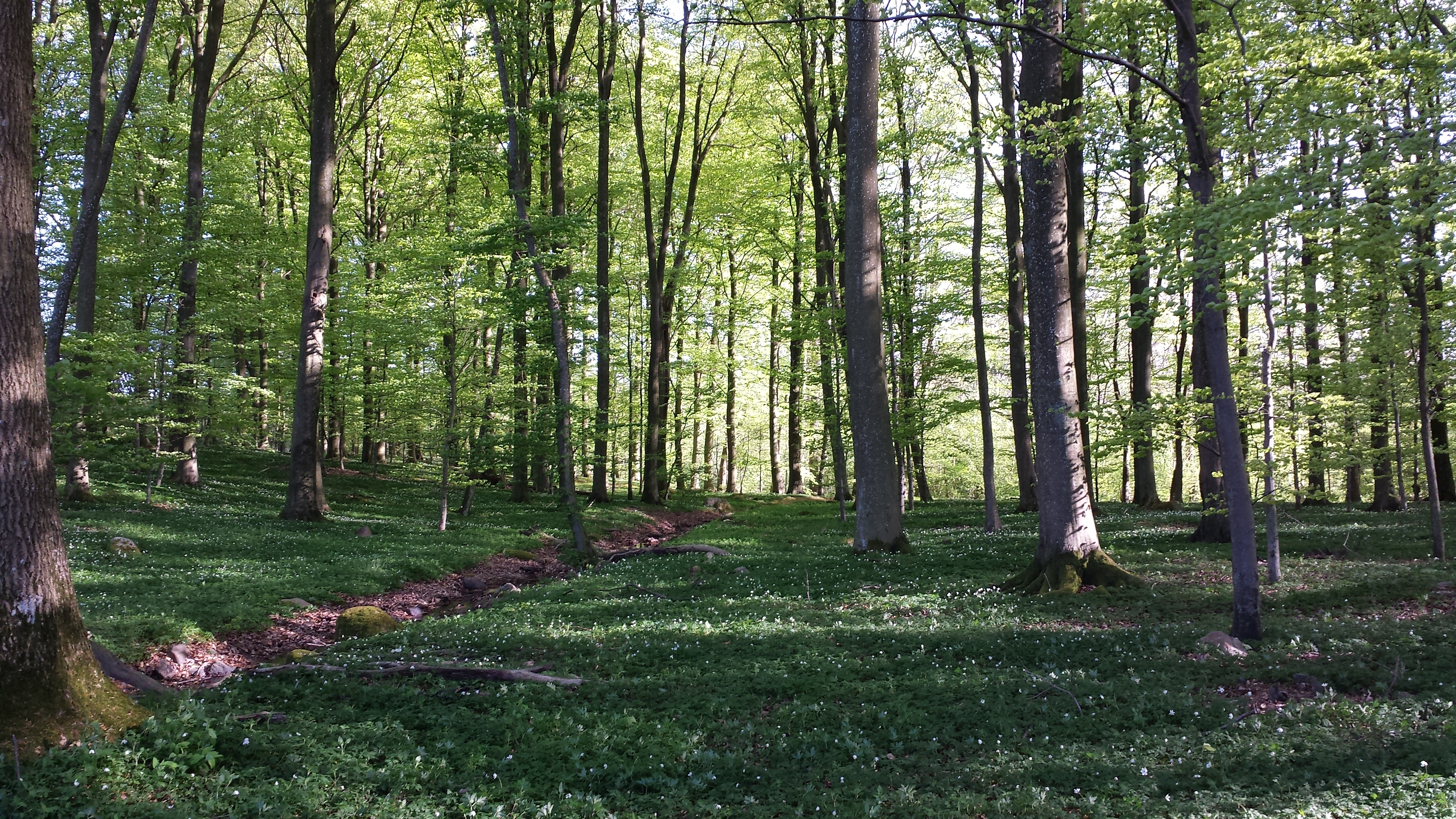
Dalby Norreskog Nature Reserve

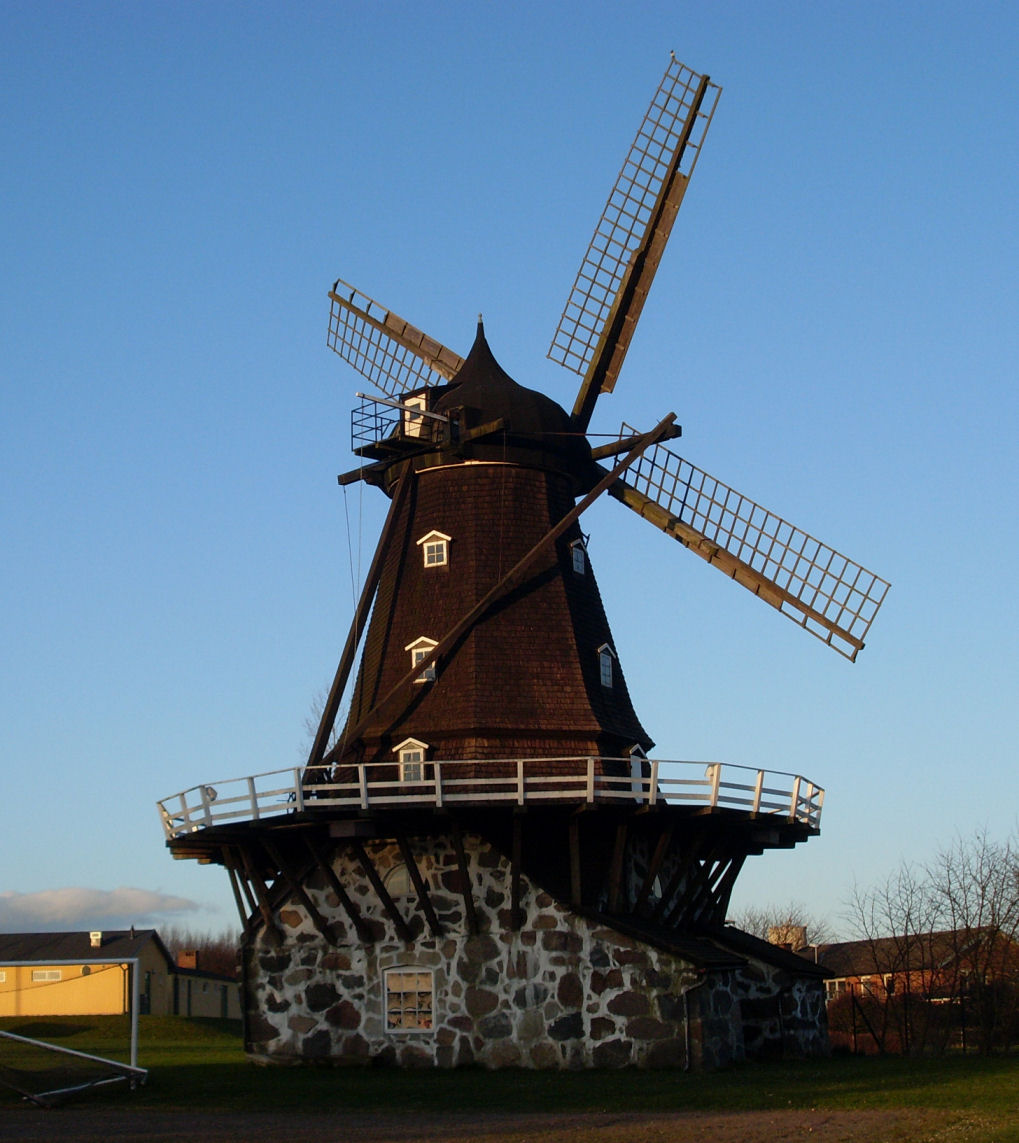
Windmill in Dalby

== Sources and external links ==
- GCatholic
