= Adalbert of Hamburg-Bremen =

Archbishop of Bremen from 1043 to 1072

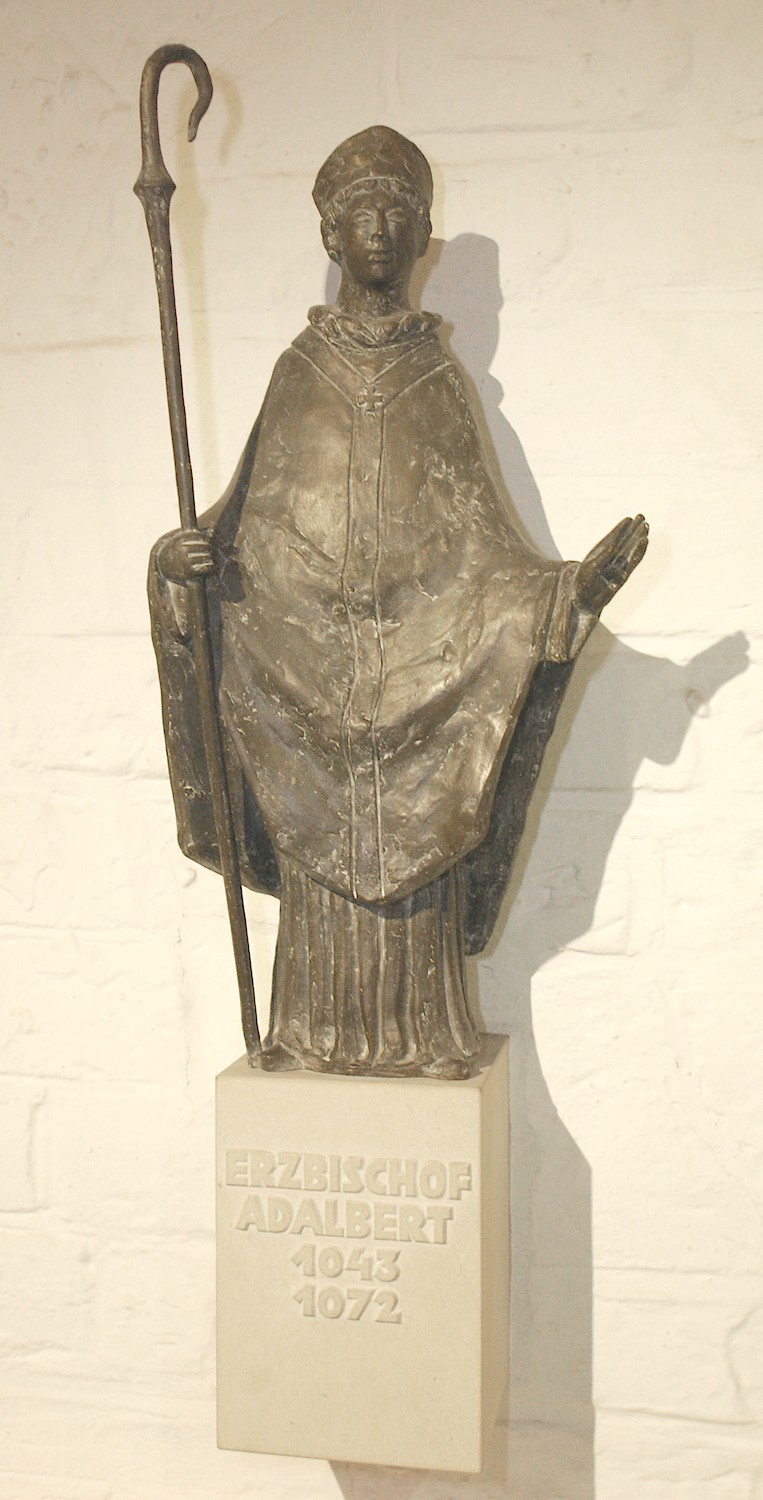
Modern statue, Bremen Cathedral

Adalbert (also Adelbert or Albert; c. 1000 – 16 March 1072) was Archbishop of Bremen from 1043 until his death. Called Vikar des Nordens, he was an important political figure of the Holy Roman Empire, papal legate, and one of the regents for Emperor Henry IV.

== Life ==
Adalbert was possibly born at Goseck Castle in Hassegau, Saxony, the son of Count Frederick of Goseck, who served as Saxon Count palatine from 1038, and his wife Agnes of Weimar. After his father's death in 1042, his office was assumed by Adalbert's elder brothers Dedo and Frederick II. Adalbert prepared for an ecclesiastical career and became subdeacon to the Archbishop of Hamburg-Bremen in 1032, later provost of the Halberstadt Cathedral, and Archbishop of Hamburg-Bremen in 1043 or 1045 with supremacy over the Scandinavian Peninsula and a great part of the Wend lands, and all territory north of the Elbe.

Having accompanied the Emperor Henry III on a christianization campaign in 1045, he also journeyed with him to Rome in 1046. Adam of Bremen rumours Adalbert to have refused a candidacy as pope, resulting in the election of Clement II, to continue with the conversion of the Wends.

Adalbert worked to increase the influence of his see, and thereby also the influence of the Holy Roman Empire, but encountered competition in Scandinavia from missionary bishops despatched from England and elsewhere who sometimes found greater favour from rulers and ordinary lay people alike. King Sweyn II of Denmark appealed to the Emperor and to Pope Leo IX for an archbishop of his own, which would mean a loss to Hamburg of lands just yielding fruits after two hundred years of Christianization. The whole discussion was cut short by the death of both Pope (1054) and Emperor (1056).

Subsequently, Adalbert lost his hold on the imperial court, and the young Emperor, Henry IV, fell under the influence of the Archbishop Anno of Cologne. However, Adalbert gained control of Henry's education, eventually superseding Anno in his confidence and esteem, but again forced to retire from court in 1066-69. Archbishop Adalbert is characterized by Adam of Bremen as:

Generous, prudent, and zealous as he was, his character was marred by indomitable pride, which has caused him to be depicted in the blackest colours.

He died at Goslar in 1072.

Adalbert of Hamburg-Bremen Counts of Goseck Born: c. 1000 in Goseck Died: 16 March 1072 in Goslar
Catholic Church titles
Preceded by Adalbrand	Archbishop of Hamburg and Bishop of Bremen also counted as Albert I 1043–1072	Succeeded by Liemar; Archbishop of Bremen
