= Mormaer of Caithness =

- Raven banner
- Creation date: 10th century?
- Created by: Constantine II of Scotland?
- Peerage: Peerage of Scotland
- First holder: Donnchad?
- Last holder: Maol Íosa
- Status: Extinct
- Extinction date: 1350
- Former seat: Braal Castle

The Mormaer of Caithness was a vassal title mostly held by members of the Norwegian nobility based in Orkney from the Viking Age until 1350. The mormaerdom was held as fief of Scotland and the title was frequently held by the Norse Earls of Orkney, who were thus a vassal of both the King of Norway and the King of Scots. There is no other example in the history of either Norway or of Scotland in which a dynasty of earls owed their allegiance to two different kings.

The earliest reference to the title is however to that of a native Scots ruler, Donnchad, although the extent of the Scottish crown's influence so far north at the time, beyond the lands of the powerful Mormaers of Moray, is questionable. The Norse saga which mentions Donnchad does not provide a date, although the context suggests the early tenth century. Nonetheless, at least since the childhood of Thorfinn Sigurdsson in c. 1020, but possibly already several decades before, the Earls of Orkney were the controlling figures. In the Norse context the distinction between earls and kings did not become significant until the late 11th century and the Caithness mormaers therefore would have had considerable independence of action until that time.

Location of Caithness to the north of the Scottish mainland, with the archipelagoes of Orkney and Shetland to the north and the Hebrides to the west.

The Pentland Firth, between Caithness and Orkney, was a stretch of water which divided the two earldoms but also united them, especially perhaps for the Norse, whose command of the seas was an important aspect of their culture. Indeed there are numerous incidents recorded in the Orkneyinga saga in which movement across these waters occurs as if the two polities were parts of a single political and cultural arena. (Note: Roland Saint-Clair, in his 1898 publication The Saint-Clairs of the Isles goes so far as to suggest that the Earldom of Orkney consisted of "two principal parts - Insular and Scottish" and refers to Caithness as the "Scottish Orcadia". Crawford (2013) describes this as a "mistake".) Even in the mid-12th century it appears that a king of Norway - Eystein Haraldsson - had no difficulty in capturing Harald Maddadson, an Earl of Orkney, from his base in Thurso, Caithness. Meanwhile a Scottish king, David I, exercised control of both areas through promotion of the Scottish Church and other indirect rather than military means. In the 13th century, especially after the Norwegian defeat at the Battle of Largs and the subsequent Treaty of Perth in 1266, the distinctions hardened and the Firth became more like a "state border".

Sutherland was part of the Caithness mormaerdom for most of this title's history, but was "taken" by Alexander II from Magnus, the first "Angus" earl, and given to others for unknown reasons.

Most dates during the Norse period are approximate, but records become more detailed and historically accurate as the line of Norse jarls comes to an end. After the close of the Jarls' Saga on the death of Jon Haraldsson in 1230, the history of Caithness is "plunged into a darkness which is illuminated by very few written sources". (Note: The reliability of the sagas in general and the Jarls' Saga in particular as an historical source is much discussed but it is recognised this improves over time. For example, Williams (2007) notes that it "is probably rather less reliable for the eleventh century than for the twelfth".)

After the rule of Maol Íosa there was no mormaer of Caithness from c. 1350 to 1379. The title Earl of Caithness was granted to David Stewart, a younger son of the Scots king, and the mormaerdom effectively continued as an earldom from that point onwards.

== Mormaers of Caithness ==
The list is by necessity a fragmentary one, the archives being not fully preserved, the reigns of some supposed mormaers being not fully attested, and so forth. According to the Landnámabók, Thorstein Olafsson (fl c. 850-c. 880) and Sigurd Eysteinsson “conquered Caithness, Sutherland and Moray, and more than half of Argyll [and] Thorstein ruled over these territories as King”. There is no suggestion that Thorstein was beholden to any overlord although his son-in-law Donnchad is described as a "native earl".

Dates	Mormaer	Notes
Early 10th century	Donnchad of Caithness	Donnchad (or Dungadr) was married to Groa, daughter of Thorstein Olafsson.
Mid 10th century	Uncertain	Thorfinn Torf-Einarsson, Donnchad's son-in-law having married his daughter Gruaidh, was a powerful Earl of Orkney from an unknown date until his death c. 963. However, there is no specific reference to him as a Mormaer of Caithness.
978–980s?	Skuli Thorfinnsson	Son of Gruaidh and Thorfinn, supported by Kenneth II of Alba. Defeated in battle by his brother Ljot in the Dales of Caithness.
980s?	Ljot Thorfinnsson	His defeat of Skuli angered the Scots and MacBeth, the Mormaer of Moray, brought a large army north. They engaged in battle at Skitten Mire near Wick where Skuli was killed (Note: The Orkneyinga saga refers to "Scots" but it is quite possible that the Scots were in alliance with the Norse against the power of Moray.) and Ljot died of his wounds shortly afterwards. (Note: Historic Environment Scotland state that the battle at Skitten Mire took place "between 943 and 945" although this does not square with the presumed death of Ljot's father, Earl Thorfinn hausakljúfr, in 963.)
980s	Hlodvir Thorfinnsson	He became Earl of Orkney after Ljot and on his death he was buried at "Ham in Caithness" suggesting that his writ extended that far, although there is no specific reference to any mainland title he may have had.
991 to 1014	Sigurd Hlodvirsson	Earl of Orkney, who "was powerful enough to defend Caithness against the Scots". Njal's saga describes his Scottish dominions as "Ross and Moray, Sutherland and the Dales", which last location may be a reference to Caithness. (Note: Crawford makes this suggestion but later speculates that the absence of a specific reference to Caithness may mean that the "native family" of Donnchad still dominated there although if so they were clearly surrounded by territories controlled by Sigurd.) Earl Sigurd was killed at the Battle of Clontarf on 23 April 1014.
1014–c.1060	Thorfinn Sigurdsson	On the death of Sigurd, Thorfinn's older half-brothers divided Orkney and Shetland between them. King Máel Coluim of Scotland, his maternal grandfather, set Thorfinn up as ruler of Caithness and Sutherland with Scots advisors to rule for him. (Note: The chronology of the life of Thorfinn inn riki is problematic. The Heimskringla states that Thorfinn was 5 years old when his father Sigurd was killed at Clontarf reliably dated to 1014. Muir (2005) dates a struggle for power with his half-brothers to 1020-21 but if Thorfinn was five years old in 1014 this would have made him only eleven or twelve by then. An earlier birthdate for Thorfinn is thus implied. Similarly, Thorfinn is often stated as dying c. 1065, although Woolf (2007) states that "there is no reason why a date in the late 1050s is not just as credible.")
Mid-11th century	Madadhan of Caithness	Orkneyinga saga mentions that "Muddan", who was a nephew of a King of Scots the saga calls Karl Hundason, became jarl of Caithness. He had not held this position long when he was killed by Thorkel "the Fosterer" Sumarlidason, an ally of Thorfinn Sigurdsson. (Note: There are further chronological issues to contend with regarding the role of Thorkel Fosterer. See Helga Moddansdóttir, it’s also important to note that Moddan of Caithness and Moddan of Dale are not same individual.)
Mid-11th century	Thorfinn Sigurdsson?	Given the bullish remarks in the Orkneyinga saga about Earl Thorfinn's exploits - "conquering all the way south as far as Fife" - it is reasonable to suppose that he regained control of Caithness after the death of Muddan, with or without the support of the Scots royal house.
To 1098	Paul and Erlend Thorfinnsson?	The sources are silent about what happened to the Caithness jarldom after Earl Thorfinn's death, although it is clear that his sons Paul and Erlend ruled as joint earls in Orkney at least.

=== Norwegian interlude ===
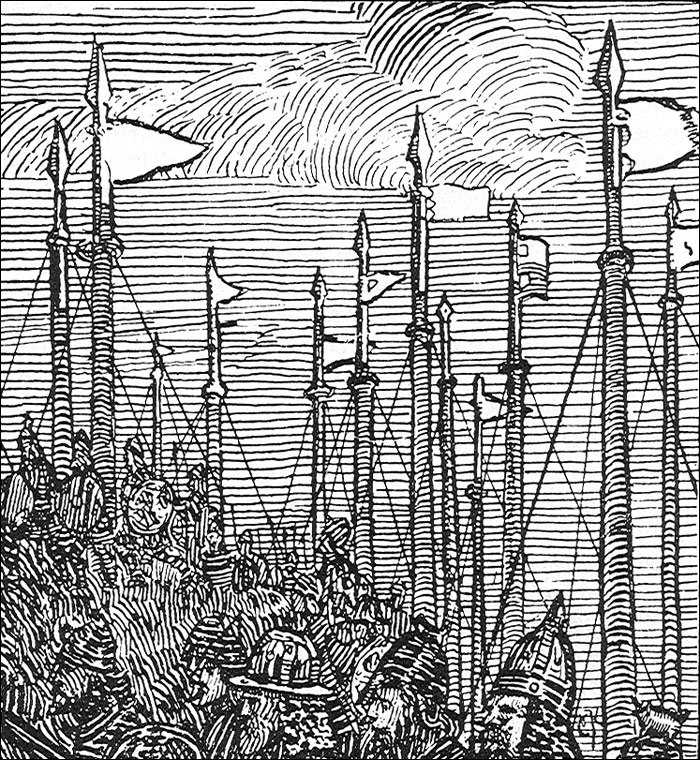
Magnus Barefoot's army in Ireland, as imagined in Gustav Storm's 1899 edition of Heimskringla

In 1098 Magnus Barefoot, King of Norway deposed the Thorfinnsson brothers as Earls of Orkney and set his 8 year old son Sigurd Magnusson up in their place. This was an unprecedented occurrence, probably intended as a permanent step. Magnus then conducted two vigorous campaigns in the Hebrides and Irish Sea region. It is likely that the de facto control of the mormaerdom was in his hands prior to his death during the second campaign in 1103 although "there does not seem to have been any intention on the Norwegian side" to formally take control of Caithness, which remained subject to the Scottish crown.

It is possible the native Celts regained the title at this time. in the late 11th or early 12th century, Ótarr son of Madadhan and brother-in-law of Haakon Paulsson is described as "jarl of Thurso". It is not certain that this second "Moddan of Dale" was a descendant of his earlier namesake, and there is no suggestion that Moddan himself was a jarl. Ótarr was the brother of Helga Moddansdóttir fl. 1015-23 and a "curiously shadowy figure".

=== Later Norse jarls ===
Dates	Mormaer	Notes
c.1104 - c.1105	Haakon Paulsson	Grandson of Thorfinn Sigurdsson and made Earl of Orkney by the young King Sigurd of Norway he also claimed Caithness.
c. 1105 - 1114	Magnus Erlendsson	Haakon Paulsson's cousin who was joint Earl of Orkney from c. 1105 until his death on Egilsay at Haakon's hands. Caithness formed half of his estates.
1114-1123	Haakon Paulsson	As sole Earl of Orkney he probably regained control of Caithness on the death of Magnus Erlendsson.
1123-1128	Harald Haakonsson	Nephew of Ótarr and son of Haakon Paulsson, he "held Caithness from the king of Scots".
1128-1136	Paul Haakonsson	Half-brother of Harald was also Earl or Orkney. He ruled jointly with Harald, then alone, then briefly with Rögnvald Kali Kolsson until his death at the hands of Sweyn Asleifsson and the descendants of Moddan of Dale. He and Earl Rögnvald divided his holdings between them, "which probably included Caithness". During the military events that preceded this division Earl Paul had gödings - allies - in Caithness but none in Shetland.
1136-1151 (jointly 1139-58)	Rögnvald Kali Kolsson	Earl of Orkney and likely ruler of Caithness for much of his tenure.
1151-54	Erlend Haraldsson	Son of Harald Haakonsson. When Earl Rögnvald left Orkney in 1151 to go on a pilgrimage to the Holy Land, Erlend obtained half of his father's lands in Caithness from Malcolm IV of Scotland.
1139-1206	Harald "the Old" Maddadsson	Grandson of Haakon Paulsson and son of Matad, Earl of Atholl. He became joint Earl of Orkney with Rögnvald as a child. During the "War of the Three Earls" 1151-58 Harald was captured from a base in Thurso by King Eystein Haraldsson of Norway aged only 18, then freed for a ransom. After the death of both Erlend and Rögnvald he became sole ruler of Orkney in 1158 until his own death in 1206.
1198	Harald "the Younger" Eiriksson	Grandson of Rögnvald Kali Kolsson. Half of Caithness was granted to him by king William the Lion but he died later that year near Wick in a military conflict with Harald Maddadsson, whose grip on Caithness then resumed.
1206-1214	David Haraldsson	Son of Harald "the Old" he ruled jointly over Caithness and Orkney with his brother Jon.
1214-1230	Jon Haraldsson	Jointly with his brother David, then alone until he was murdered in Thurso.

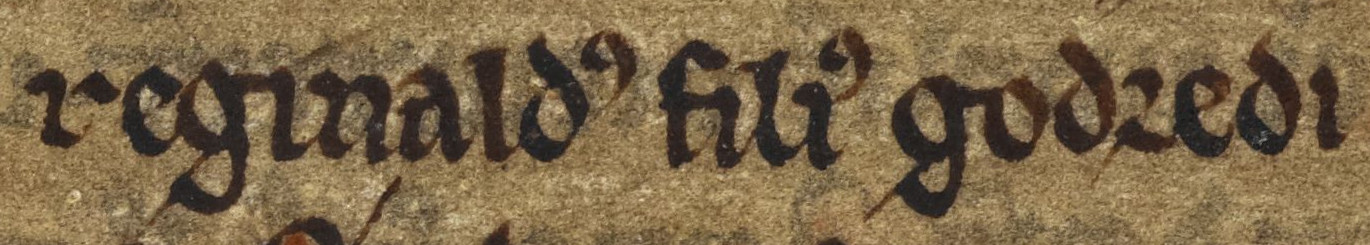
Rognvaldr Gudrodsson's name as it appears on folio 40v of British Library Cotton MS Julius A VII (the Chronicle of Mann): "Reginaldus filjus Godredi".

After the failure of Harald the Younger, c.1200 William of Scotland then asked King of the Isles Rognvaldr Gudrodsson (Raghnall mac Gofraidh) to take Caithness on behalf of the Scottish Crown. Rognvaldr marched north, subduing the region and then returned to the Isles leaving three stewards in charge. Although not descended from previous Orcadian earls, Rognvaldr was related to these Norse magnates through his paternal grandfather's marriage to Ingibjorg, daughter of Haakon Paulsson. There is no evidence of his installation as a Mormaer of Caithness, only that he was appointed to administer the province. (Note: As a king himself Rognvaldr would in any case have considered such a title to be beneath his dignity and the contract between him and William is assumed to have been financially advantageous. Following an incursion into the Hebrides by Inge Bardson c. 1210, Rognvaldr thought it expedient to go to Norway in the company of his son Gofraid Donn to effect a reconciliation with the Norwegian Crown.) His tenure in Caithness seems to have been short-lived and once again Harald Maddadsson became the undisputed ruler of his northern holdings.

=== Angus and Strathearn rulers ===
Jon Haraldsson's son Harald had drowned in 1226 and as there were no male heirs two parties with a claim sought the jarldom from King Haakon Haakonsson of Norway. On their return to Orkney in the autumn of 1232 in a single ship the claimants and their supporters were all lost at sea. As early as 2 October of that year the Caithness title was claimed by a member of the family of the Earl of Angus and it was to this house that Caithness and Orkney were eventually granted.

Dates	Mormaer	Notes
1235	Walter Comyn, Mormaer of Menteith	Comyn signed a charter in July 1235 as "Earl of Caithness" but if he was so appointed it was as a temporary measure.
1236-1239	Magnus II	Also Earl of Orkney, was granted Caithness in two halves (north and south) but it seems to have been held by an unknown other prior to his investiture. His parentage is uncertain and he may have been a descendant of Ingrid, a daughter of Rögnvald Kali Kolsson. Sutherland - the southern half (Note: Crawford (2013) refers to Sutherland as "the southern half of Caithness" in the context of Earl Sigurd digri in the late 10th century but seems less certain that this was the division of Caithness referred to in the early 13th.)- was "taken" by Alexander II from Magnus and given to Hugh de Moravia for unknown reasons.
1239?	Joanna and Matilda?	There is a fragmentary reference in the Panmure Codex to two sisters called Joanna and Matilda who inherited a joint title to Caithness from "a virgin who died without progeny". They may have had a family connection to Moddan of Dale and/or to Jon Haraldsson. Alternatively, the sisters may have been the children of Earl Gilbert. It is not clear when their rule is supposed to have taken place. (Note: Crawford suggests two possibilities: that the sisters inherited a share to the Caithness title after the death of Magnus II or during the interregnum between 1320 and 1330. In the former case Joanna and Matilda could have been the children of a daughter of Jon Haraldsson and Duncan, possibly a brother of Magnus II. Matilda then may have married a Gilbert (I) who had a claim to the mormaerdom and their son Gilbert II succeeded, dying in 1256. In the second case, it is known that a daughter of Gilbert II called Matilda was married to Malise II, Earl of Strathearn and that about this time a Joanna (fl. 1269-86) was the wife of Freskin de Moravia, a nephew of William de Moravia, 3rd Earl of Sutherland. Although there is no record of such a relationship between them Joanna could have been Matilda's sister. Thomson favours the earlier option with Magnus II being the "virgin" and credits Crawford with yet another suggestion - that one of the sisters was Matilda, Countess of Angus.)
1239?-1256	Gilbert	Gilbert (Gille Brigte) was not the son of Magnus, to whom his relationship is obscure. He ruled Caithness as well as Orkney and he may have been preceded by another Gilbert.
1256-1273	Magnus Gilbertsson	Son of Gilbert. Magnus initially played a role in the Scottish–Norwegian War in support of Haakon IV of Norway and in 1263 Caithness was granted a separate peace treaty in return for paying a fine. The negotiations were partly responsible for delaying Haakon's assault on the west coast of Scotland.
1273-1284	Magnus Magnusson	Son of Magnus Gilbertsson.
1284-1303	Jón Magnússon	Son of Magnus Gilbertsson, he was as cautious as his father in balancing Scots and Norwegian interests. In 1300 his was the last signature on the Ragman Rolls.
1303-1320	Magnus Jónsson	Son of Jón Magnússon. Magnus was still a minor on the death of his father sometime between 1300 and 1303 and wards were in place until he came of age in 1312. His last known act was to sign the Declaration of Arbroath in October 1320 and he was dead by August of the following year.
1321-1330	Uncertain	The singular lack of haste with which a new title was granted by either the Scots to Caithness or the Norwegians to Orkney has led to the suggestion that Magnus may have had an heir who was a minor, but who died before 1330. In December 1330 a Margaret Fraser is described as one of the heirs to the Caithness title although the nature of her claim is unknown. It is also likely that unravelling the genealogy of Maol Íosa and providing proofs of his descent was a time-consuming project.
1330-1350	Maol Íosa	Some time after Magnus Jonsson's death the title was granted to Maol Íosa, Mormaer of Strathearn, a distant relative of Earl Gilbert. His ancestry is not clear but he may have been a descendant of the Matilda mentioned in the Panmure Codex. Maol Íosa ruled both Orkney and Caithness and had several daughters, but no sons.

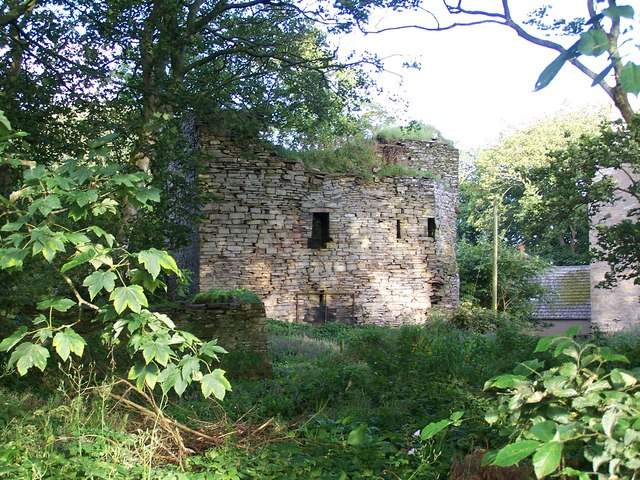
The ruins of Braal Castle, the caput of the Caithness mormaers which was given over to the Scottish crown in 1375 by Alexander of Ard.

There was no Mormaer of Caithness from c. 1350 to 1379. Alexander of Ard, the son of Maol Íosa's daughter Matilda and Weland of Ard (the Aird, west of Inverness) was considered the rightful heir to Caithness but he resigned his interest in 1375 to King Robert II, possibly for a financial compensation or the king's support for his attempt to become Earl of Orkney. The power vacuum in Caithness was filled by William III, Earl of Ross. After this time the title "Earl of Caithness" was granted to David Stewart, 1st Earl of Caithness a younger son of Robert II whose successors have borne that title from then until the present day.

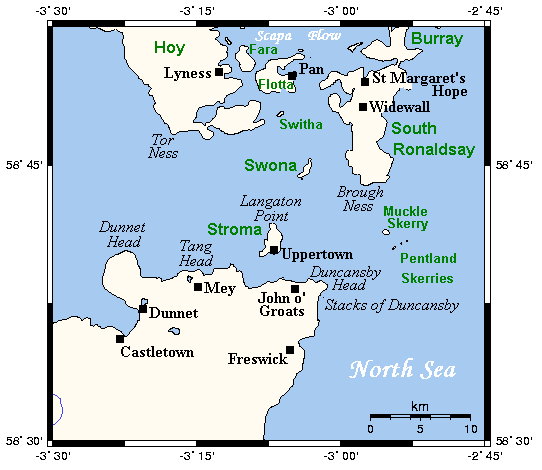
The Pentland Firth, the "waterway which divided - or united - the Earldoms of Caithness and Orkney". Caithness is to the south and some of the Orkney islands are to the north.

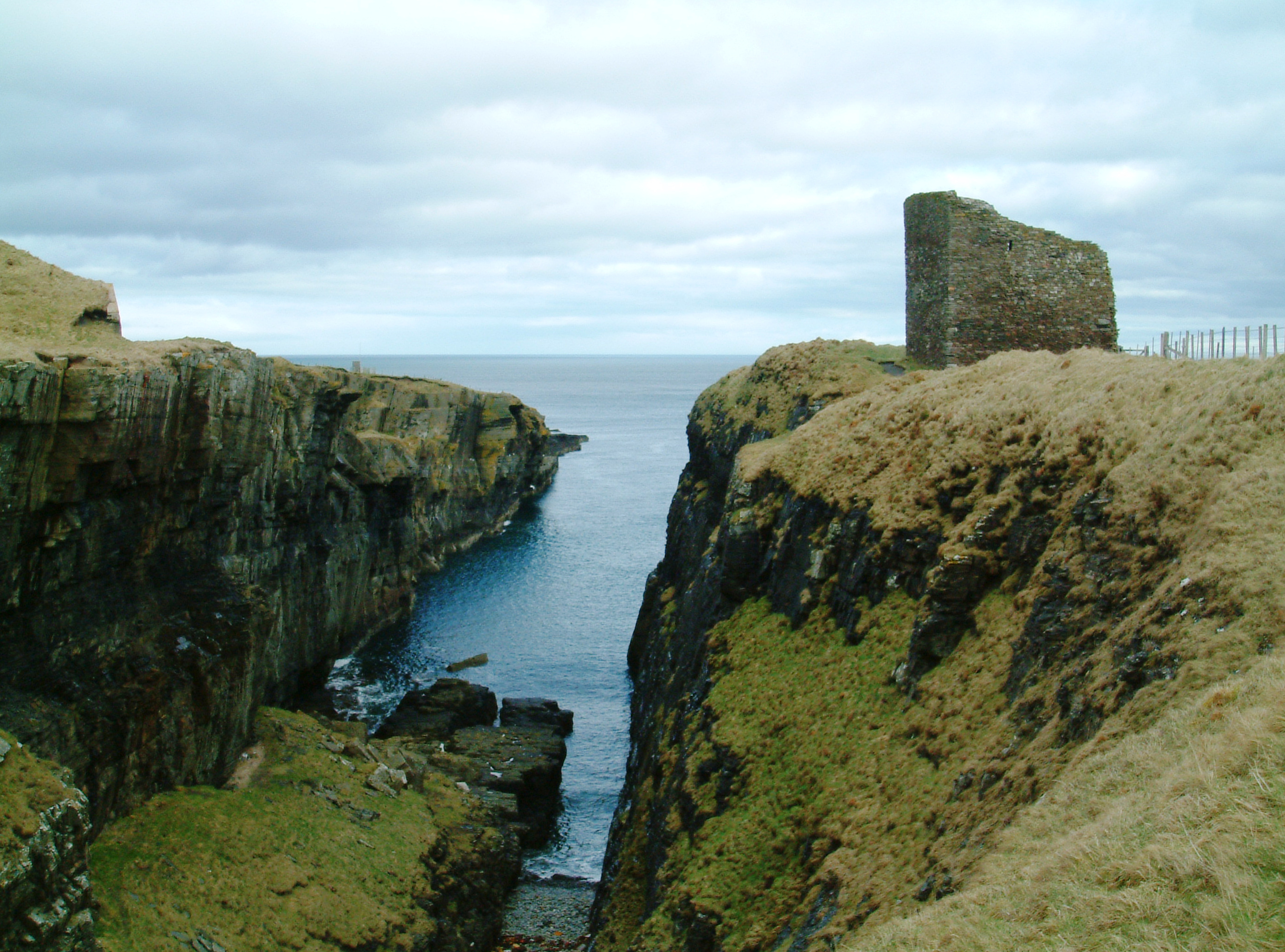
Ruins of the Castle of Old Wick, a twelfth- or thirteenth-century fortress, which may have been a winter residence of Harald Maddadsson.
