= Ljótólfr =

Character in the Orkneyinga saga

- Known for: Appearing in the Orkneyinga saga
- Children: Fugl (son)

Notes
- Ljótólfr, and his son, are known from the Orkneyinga saga

Ljótólfr (Note: His name is also sometimes referred to as Liotholfus, Liotolf, Liótólf, Liotulf, Ljotolf, and Ljotulf.) is a minor character in the mediaeval Orkneyinga saga, who is purported to have flourished in the mid-12th century. The Orkneyinga saga was compiled in about 1200, and documents the reigns of the earls of Orkney. It depicts Ljótólfr as a nobleman who lived on the Outer Hebridean Isle of Lewis. During the 12th century, the Hebrides formed part of the Kingdom of Mann and the Isles.

The Orkneyinga saga relates how Ljótólfr was a friendly acquaintance of the Viking chieftain Sveinn Ásleifarson, who is one of the major characters of the entire saga. The saga states that Ljótólfr housed Sveinn for some time on Lewis, and took in Sveinn's brother, who was banished from Orkney. Ljótólfr's son, Fugl, appears in the saga, although he is depicted at being at odds with Sveinn, until a relative of Fugl's negotiates peace between the two. Several historians have considered Ljótólfr to be an ancestor of Clan MacLeod; one of these considered Ljótólfr to be the eponymous ancestor of the clan—although the current understanding of the clan's ancestry regards another man as the eponym.

== Background ==
Ljótólfr is a minor character in the Orkneyinga saga. He is purported to have flourished in the mid-12th century, and to have lived on the Outer Hebridean Isle of Lewis. Ljótólfr has a son, Fugl, another minor character in the saga, who is also described as being from the island. (Note: According to Aslak Liestøl in 1983, the name Fugl, in a West Norse context, is only found in this character, and in a runic inscription found in 1962 on the Inner Hebridean island of Iona. This inscription has been dated to the late 10th century, or 11th century. The name is also known in pre-Conquest England, and in mediaeval Danish and Swedish sources. The name originated as a byname derived from the Old West Norse fugl, which means "fowl", "bird". Historian Alan Orr Anderson noted in 1922, that the mediaeval Chronicle of Man records for the year 1183: "Fogolt, the sheriff of Man, died". Anderson stated that it is possible that Ljótólfr's son was the mentioned sheriff. Later in 1937, Manx linguist John Joseph Kneen noted this sheriff, and two other instances of the name on the island, and stated that these names (Fogolt, Fogal) are derived from the Manx Gaelic Foghial, meaning "under promise or pledge".)

=== Sources ===
The main source for Ljótólfr is the Orkneyinga saga, which was compiled sometime around 1200 by an unknown Icelander. The saga is thought to have been based upon poetry, oral tradition, and other written material. It can be summed up as an account of the lives of many of the earls of Orkney between the 9th and 13th centuries. According to research fellow Ian Beuermann, the saga is useful not for the specific events it describes, but rather for what it reveals about "the ideas shaping the texts during the periods of composition or revision". For example, it is possible that even one of the main characters of the saga, Sveinn Ásleifarson, never existed, or at least that the historical Sveinn differed from the saga's portrayal of him. Another source which mentions Ljótólfr is Þormóður Torfason's 17th-century Latin history of Orkney, which follows the Orkneyinga saga.

=== The Hebrides in the 12th century ===
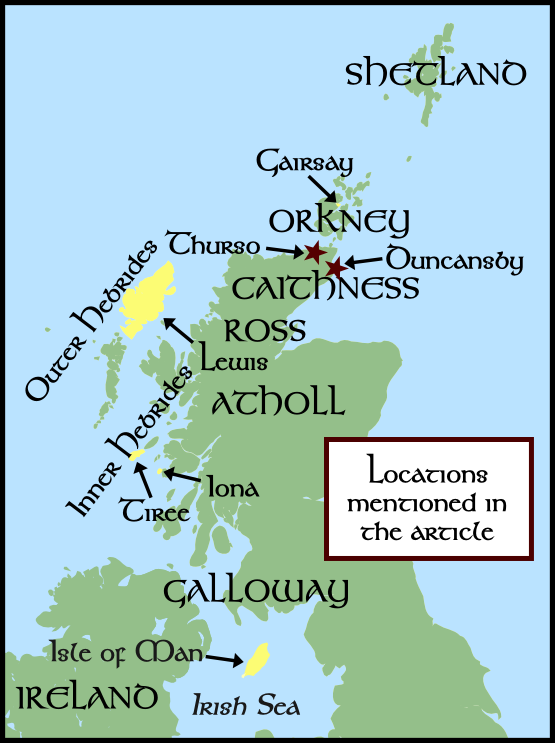
Locations mentioned in the article

In the 11th century, the earls of Orkney were at the height of their power. The Earl of Orkney, Þórfinnr Sigurðarson, also ruled Caithness and Sutherland, and seems to have controlled the western seaboard of Scotland, and the Hebrides. Historian Magnús Stefánsson described the political situation of the Hebrides and the Isle of Man during the 11th and early 12th century as being unstable, and suffering from the rivalries of petty kings and chieftains. In 1079, the Hebridean warlord Gofraidh Crobhán was able to unite the Hebrides and the Isle of Man into an effective independent kingdom. In 1098–9, the Norwegian king Magnús Óláfsson invaded the Hebrides, and asserted his right over the islands; he did so again in 1102–3. He is thought to have planned to unite Orkney, the Hebrides, and the Isle of Mann, under the control of his son. In 1103, Magnús was slain in Ireland, and no Norwegian king set foot in the islands for over a century and a half. With Magnús' death, the Outer Hebrides were brought back under the control of the Kingdom of Mann and the Isles, whose kings tactfully recognised Norwegian sovereignty. In 1156, the kingdom was partitioned following an inconclusive sea battle between the warlord Somhairle mac Gille Brighde, and the Manx king Gofraidh mac Amhlaibh: the Outer Hebrides remained under the control of Gofraidh, but the Inner Hebrides were ruled separately by Somhairle. Two years later, Somhairle successfully invaded the Isle of Man, took the throne, and ruled the entire Kingdom of Mann and the Isles until his death in 1164.

== Ljótólfr in the Orkneyinga saga ==
One of the most prominent characters of the Orkneyinga saga is the Viking chieftain Sveinn Ásleifarson, who lived on the island of Gairsay, in Orkney. The saga relates how Sveinn's father, Óláfr Hrólfsson, was one of several chieftains who supported Páll Hákonsson, Earl of Orkney, in a victorious sea battle against a fleet led by Ölvir Rósta in support of Rögnvaldr Kolsson, who had been appointed the earl of half of Orkney by the King of Norway. (Note: A.O. Anderson suggested the date of this battle to be 26 June 1136.) Óláfr was later burned to death inside his own house by Ölvir, the grandson of Frakökk, an ambitious woman, portrayed as a villain in the saga. Frakökk attempted to win the Earldom of Orkney for her descendants—particularly Ölvir.

The saga relates how in Orkney, Sveinn murdered one of the earl's followers, and immediately fled to the Bishop of Orkney. The bishop protected Sveinn by sending him away to the Suðreyjar, into the care of Holdboði Hundason, a chieftain on the Inner Hebridean island of Tiree. Later, in early spring, (Note: A.O. Anderson dated this to the spring of 1136.) the saga relates how Sveinn travelled to Atholl, where he stayed for a long period of time. From Atholl, Sveinn made his way back towards Orkney by land, and on the journey northwards, he passed through Thurso, in Caithness. The saga notes that Sveinn was accompanied by Ljótólfr, and that Sveinn had spent much of the previous spring with Ljótólfr. The chieftain who lived at Thurso was an earl named Óttarr, who is described as "a man worthy of honour". Earl Óttarr was a brother of Frakökk, and the saga relates how Ljótólfr negotiated a truce between Sveinn and Earl Óttarr, after Sveinn's father was killed by Ölvir.

The saga states that Sveinn made numerous Viking expeditions throughout the Hebrides, and into the Irish Sea zone. On one such occasion, Sveinn set up a base on the Isle of Man, where he married a wealthy widow. Some time later, Sveinn and his men were attacked by a force led by Holdboði, and in consequence Sveinn left the island and sailed north into the Hebrides to Lewis. (Note: A.O. Anderson dated the marriage to no earlier than 1140; he dated the attack to no earlier than 1141; and dated Sveinn leaving the island for Lewis, no earlier than the year 1142.)

Further on in the saga, it is stated that Sveinn's brother, Gunni Óláfsson, had children with Margrét Hákonardóttir, mother of Haraldr Maddaðarson, Earl of Orkney, Mormaer of Caithness. Because of this relationship with his mother, Haraldr banished Gunni from the earldom, and enmity arose between Sveinn and the earl. Sveinn then sent Gunni to stay with Ljótólfr on Lewis, with whom Sveinn himself had stayed at an earlier time. The saga also states that at this time, Ljótólfr's son, Fugl, was with Haraldr, and consequently there was a "coldness" between Fugl and Sveinn. The saga relates that Sveinn stole a ship from Fugl, who had been travelling to Orkney to meet Haraldr. However, subsequently a relation of Fugl's, named Anakol, who became a friend of Sveinn, succeeded in making peace between the two. (Note: A.O. Anderson dated the events concerning Fugl to the year 1154.) Historian Garreth Williams noted that Anakol's name is Gaelic in origin, and like Ljótólfr and Fugl, he is described as being originally from the Hebrides. The saga also states that he was from a good family. (Note: According to Anderson's English edition of the saga (1873), later on Anakol's brother, Arnfinnr, and three other men, including a man named Ljótólfr, were all taken prisoner by followers of Haraldr following a brief skirmish. Vigfusson's Icelandic edition (1887) gives the man's name as Ljótr, but a corresponding footnote reads "Ljótr] Ljótólfr, Fl.". Pálsson and Edwards' English edition (1981) gives this man's name as Ljótr.)

== Links to Clan MacLeod ==
Captain F. W. L. Thomas, a 19th-century antiquarian, proposed that Ljótólfr was the eponymous progenitor of Clan MacLeod. However, today the accepted understanding is that the clan's eponymous ancestor is another man, Leod, who flourished about a century after Ljótólfr. Leod's name, and the modern surname MacLeod, are considered to be ultimately derived from the Old Norse personal name Ljótr. (Note: Specifically, the modern forms Leod and MacLeod, are Anglicised forms of the Scottish Gaelic Leòd and MacLeòid, which are in turn derived from the older Old Norse Ljótr.) This name is derived from the Old West Norse word ljótr, meaning "foul", "ugly", "misshapen" or alternatively “shining”, “bright”. The personal name Ljótólfr is composed of two elements—the first, liút, is derived from the Germanic word meaning "light", "shining"; the second element, ólfr, is derived from a Germanic word meaning "wolf". (Note: While it has been suggested that the Ljótr may be derived from the element liút, like Ljótólfr, this is currently thought to be improbable.) While the current understanding of Leod's ancestry does not include a man named Ljótólfr, the 20th-century clan historian Alick Morrison considered it possible that Ljótólfr could be an ancestor of Leod, albeit on his distaff side; Morrison even suggested that Leod's name could have been derived from Ljótólfr.

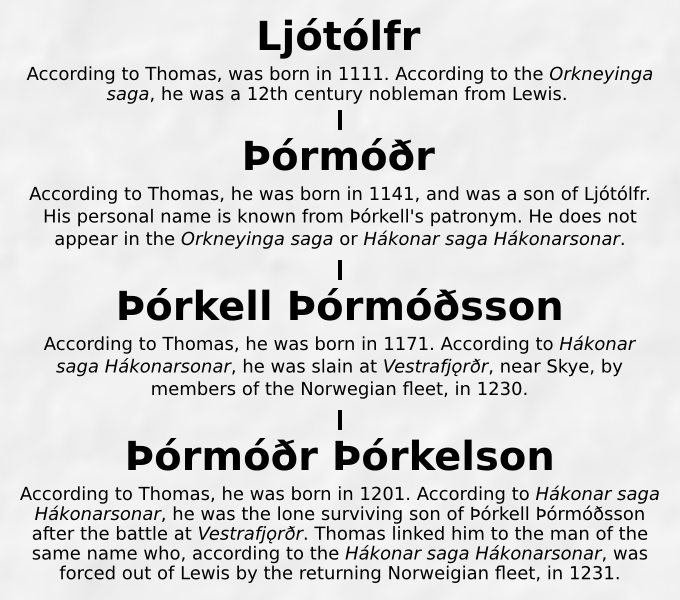
Thomas' proposed connection between Ljótólfr and Þórketill.

The MacLeods have two main branches—Sìol Thormoid (Scottish Gaelic: "seed of Tormod") and Sìol Thorcaill ("seed of Torcall"). Sìol Thorcaill was the dominant family on Lewis from the Late Middle Ages until the end of the 16th century. The Gaelic names Tormod and Torcall are derived from the Old Norse names Þórmóðr and Þórketill. Thomas noted that these names were also those of two men with Lewis connections, who are both recorded in the 13th-century kings' saga Hákonar saga Hákonarsonar. One of these men was Þórketill Þórmóðsson, who according to the saga, was slain near the Isle of Skye in about the year 1230. Thomas proposed that this man could be a grandson of Ljótólfr. Another man who appears in the saga, Þórmóðr Þórkelsson, was forced to flee Lewis, leaving behind his wife, retainers, and goods; according to Thomas, this shows that Þórmóðr was a resident on the island. Thomas noted that Þórmóðr Þórkelsson was married in about 1231, and on the assumption that each generation could be estimated to be 30 years, Thomas gave Þórmóðr's birth at 1201; his (supposed) father, Þórketill, at 1171; Þórketill's father Þórmóðr at 1141; and this man's father at 1111. Thomas concluded that the elder Þórmóðr would have been born at about the time Ljótólfr flourished on Lewis.

== See also ==
- History of the Outer Hebrides

== Bibliography ==
- Anderson, Alan Orr (1922), Early Sources of Scottish History: A.D. 500 to 1286, vol. 2, Edinburgh: Oliver and Boyd
- Anderson, Joseph, ed. (1873), The Orkneyinga saga, Translated by Jón Andrésson Hjaltalín, and Gilbert Goudie, Edinburgh: Edmonston and Douglas
- Hanks, Patrick; Hodges, Flavia (2006), Hardcastle, Kate (ed.), Oxford Dictionary of Names (2nd ed.), Oxford: Oxford University Press, ISBN 978-0-19-861060-1
- Haywood, John (1995), The Penguin Historical Atlas of the Vikings, London: Penguin Group, ISBN 0-14-051328-0
- Hudson, Benjamin T. (2005), Viking pirates and Christian princes: dynasty, religion, and empire in the North Atlantic, Oxford University Press, ISBN 978-0-19-516237-0
- Kneen, John Joseph (1937), The personal names of the Isle of Man, Oxford University Press
- Liestøl, Aslak (1983), "An Iona rune stone and the world of Man and the Isles", in Fell, Christine; Foote, Peter; Graham-Campbell, James; et al. (eds.), The Viking Age In The Isle of Man: Select papers from The Ninth Viking Congress, Isle of Man, 4–14 July 1981, Viking Society for Northern Research University College London, ISBN 0-903521-16-4
- Mackenzie, William Cook (1903), History of the Outer Hebrides: (Lewis, Harris, North and South Uist, Benbecula, and Barra), Paisley: Alexander Gardner
- MacLeod, Roderick Charles (1927), The MacLeods of Dunvegan, Edinburgh: Privately printed for the Clan MacLeod Society
- Pálsson, Hermann; Edwards, Paul Geoffrey, eds. (1981), Orkneyinga saga: the history of the Earls of Orkney (Reprint ed.), Edinburgh: Penguin Classics, ISBN 978-0-14-044383-7
- Stefánsson, Magnús (2003), "The Norse island communities of the Western Ocean", in Helle, Knut (ed.), The Cambridge History of Scandinavia: Volume 1: Prehistory to 1520, vol. 1, Cambridge University Press, ISBN 0-521-47299-7
- Torfæus, Thormodus (1866), Pope, Alexander (ed.), Ancient History of Orkney, Caithness, & the North, Wick: Peter Reid
- Thomas, F.W.L. (1874–76), "Did the Northmen extirpate the Celtic Inhabitants of the Hebrides in the Ninth Century?" (PDF), Proceedings of the Society of Antiquaries of Scotland, 11, archived from the original (PDF) on 11 June 2007
- Thomas, F.W.L. (1879–80), "Traditions of the Macaulays of Lewis" (PDF), Proceedings of the Society of Antiquaries of Scotland, 14, archived from the original (PDF) on 11 June 2007
- Vigfusson, Gudbrand, ed. (1887), Icelandic sagas and other historical documents relating to the settlements and descents of the Northmen on the British isles, London
- Williams, Gareth (2007), "'These people were high-born and thought a lot of themselves': A family of Moddan of Dale", in Smith, Beverley Ballin; Taylor, Simon; Williams, Gareth (eds.), West Over the Sea: Studies in Scandinavian Sea-Borne Expansion and Settlement Before 1300, The Northern World: North Europe and the Baltic c. 400-1700 AD. Peoples, Economies and Cultures, vol. 31, Leiden: Brill, ISBN 978-90-04-15893-1, ISSN 1569-1462
- Woolf, Alex (2004), "The Age of Sea-Kings, 900-1300", in Omand, Donald (ed.), The Argyll Book, Edinburgh: Birlinn, ISBN 1-84158-253-0
