= Helga Moddansdóttir =

Helga Moddansdóttir was the mistress of Haakon Paulsson who was Earl of Orkney from 1105 to 1123.

The Orkneyinga saga states that she was the daughter of Moddan (Scottish Gaelic: Madadhan) - described as a rich and well-born farmer - and that she and the earl had three children. She was a member of a powerful dynasty in northern Scotland, sometimes referred to as "Clan Moddan" by modern historians, whose power base was "Dale" possibly near the modern-day Helmsdale in Sutherland. Although little is known about her own activities save a fabulous story about a poisoned shirt that supposedly killed her son Harald it is clear that she, her sister Frakkök and her children had a significant impact on the politics of early 12th century Orkney, Caithness and Sutherland.

== Family background and status ==
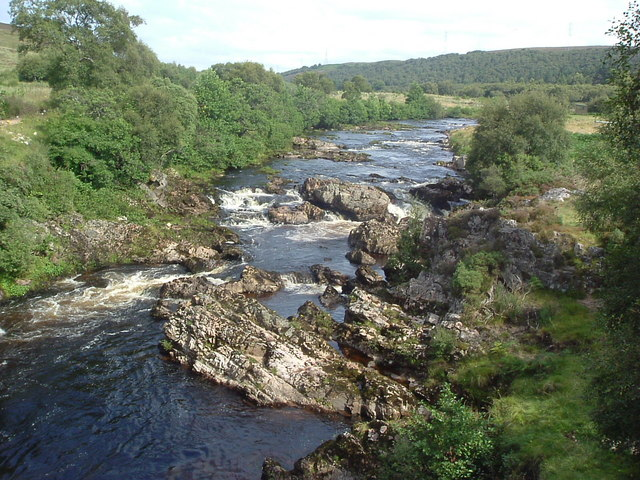
The River Helmsdale in the area inland from modern-day Helmsdale where Clan Moddan had a power base

After the death of earl Magnus Erlendsson c. 1115 at the hands of his cousin Haakon Paulsson, the family of Moddan of Dale played a significant part in the affairs of the Earldom of Orkney. However, their origins are obscure. For a date in the mid-11th century the Orkneyinga saga mentions that "Muddan", who was a nephew of a King of Scots the saga calls Karl Hundason, became jarl of Caithness. He had not held this position long when he was killed by Thorkel "the Fosterer" Sumarlidason, an ally of Earl of Orkney Thorfinn Sigurdsson. (Note: There are chronological issues to contend with regarding the role of Thorkel Fosterer. Williams (2007) suggest a date in the 1030s for the killing of Muddan. However, given that Thorkel himself is killed after the death of Earl Haakon c. 1123 this would make him 100 years old or more by then. Orkneyinga saga "is probably rather less reliable for the eleventh century than for the twelfth" and it is possible that Thorfinn Sigurdsson's war with Karl Hundason took place later than this. (A Norse language version of the saga published in 1887 simply dates these events to the mid-11th century.) Thorfinn is often stated as dying c. 1064, so if Thorkel was at least 16 years old in the 1050s he could have been about 80 at the time of his death.) Thorkel was able to approach Muddan's base in Thurso because "all the people of Caithness were faithful and loyal to him". It is far from certain that Helga's father Moddan was a descendant of this earlier namesake, and there is no suggestion that Moddan was a jarl, but his son Ótarr apparently was. Furthermore, Ótarr also had his base at Thurso.

Whatever their origins, in addition to the titled Ótarr, Helga's siblings were, Angus "the Generous" and her sisters Frakkök and Þorleif. These children had both Norse and Gaelic names, whereas Orcadian families tended to have exclusively Norse names. It is thus likely that Helga's ancestors were of mixed heritage with her father being of Celtic origin and her mother possibly having a Norse background and related to the jarl Óttar who was killed in 1098 fighting in Man.

The saga describes Helga as the mistress or concubine of Earl Haakon, but has nothing to say about the mother of Haakon's other named child, Páll. Sellar (2000) suggests that a degree of polygamy appears to have been acceptable among high-status families in Norse Scotland and that the distinction between wives and concubines may not have been rigid.

== Children ==
Helga and Harald's children had diverse fortunes. Harald "Smooth-tongue" became earl on the death of his father and ruled jointly with his half-brother Páll "the Silent" until his death in 1130. His demise apparently came about because of a plot involving Helga and her sister Frakkök.

Ingibjörg married Olaf Morsel, King of the Isles. Their daughter Ragnhild married Somerled and from them descended the 13th-century Lords of Argyll, and Clan MacDougall, the Lords of the Isles, Clan Donald, Clan MacRory, and Clan MacAlister.

Their third child Margaret married Matad, Earl of Atholl, whose son Harald Maddadsson was earl of Orkney from 1138 until 1206 and whom the Orkneyinga Saga describes one of the three most powerful Earls of Orkney along with Sigurd Eysteinsson and Thorfinn Sigurdsson.

After the death of Earl Haakon c. 1123 Harald and Páll inherited their father's title "and the farmers had grave doubts about how the brothers... would get on together."

When Frakkök's husband Ljot "the Renegade" died she journeyed from her home in Sutherland to Orkney in the company of Sigurd "Fake-Deacon" (so-called because he had trained as a priest) and other members of her clan. Frakkök and Helga "had a lot to say in the government of Earl Harald" and soon two factions emerged, each supporting one of the joint earls. These political troubles also involved Thorkel Fosterer who had been a close ally of Earl Magnus and who had suffered under the rule of Earl Haakon. Earl Harald and Sigurd Fake-Deacon attacked and killed the by now elderly Thorkel, which infuriated Earl Páll and led to a political crisis. Fearing war, the Orcadian farmers clamoured for a settlement and eventually Sigurd was banished from the islands and Harald had to pay compensation for the death of Thorkel.

== Tale of the poisoned shirt ==
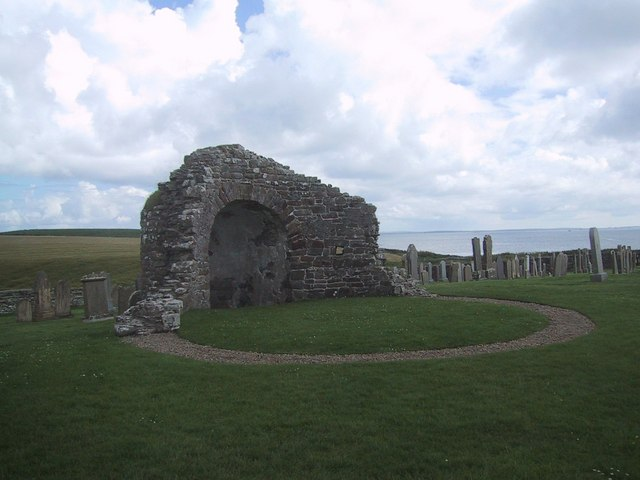
Ruins of the Round Church at the Earl's Bu, Orphir. The Earl's Bu was a great hall, and the location of the death of Harald Haakonsson

As was typically the case with Icelandic language writing of this period, the aims of the Orkneyinga saga were to provide a sense of social continuity through the telling of history combined with an entertaining narrative drive. The tales are thought to have been compiled from a number of sources, combining family pedigrees, praise poetry and oral legends with historical facts. Occasionally however, there are examples of obviously fictional elements such as the effects of the poisoned shirt that killed jarl Harald Haakonsson.

The saga relates how at Christmas (c. 1130) (Note: Muir suggests "around the year 1128" whereas Thomson (2008) has "c. 1130".) Frakökk and Helga were staying on Earl Harald's estate at Orphir prior to a Yule feast to which Harald had invited his half-brother Páll. The sisters were sewing a snow-white garment embroidered with gold. This garment was enchanted, and the two sisters had intended it for Earl Páll. Unfortunately for the sisters, Earl Harald noticed the beautiful garment and, despite their protestations, put the garment on. His body gave a great shiver which was followed by a burning pain and soon after he died. The saga states that Earl Páll immediately took control of his deceased half-brother's possessions, and that he was highly suspicious of the two sisters thereafter.

== Banishment ==
The descendants of Moddan according to the Orkneyinga saga

After the death of Harald, Helga and Frakkök were banished from Orkney and returned to Dale, where Frakkök was killed by Sweyn Asleifsson after an ill-judged attack against Earl Páll using troops she and her grandson Olvir "Brawl" had gathered in the Hebrides. After the "sinister" Frakkök's death her holdings in Sutherland were inherited by Eirik Stay-Brails, grandson of Þorleif Moddansdottir. The saga is silent regarding Helga's fate although it does relate that in the complex battle for power between Earl Páll and Rognvald Kali Kolsson that followed Earl Harald's death, Asleifsson kidnapped Earl Páll when he spotted him hunting for otters on the shores of Rousay c. 1136. Asleifsson delivered the earl to Helga's daughter Margaret in Atholl from which imprisonment he did not re-emerge.

== Interpretations ==
Thomson (2008) offers the view that the tale of the poisoned shirt "is probably no more than a story which owes its origin to rumours which surrounded Harald's sudden death". Williams (2007) argues that affairs of Clan Moddan draw attention to value of exploring the complex relationships between the noble houses of the "two main political entities" of Scandinavian Scotland in the Norðreyjar and the Suðreyjar.
