= Haraldsson =

Haraldsson is a surname of Icelandic or Swedish origin, meaning son of Harald or son of Haraldur. Its Danish and Norwegian equivalent is Haraldsen. In Old Norse or Icelandic names, the name is not a surname, but a patronymic. The name refers to:

- Godfrid Haraldsson (820–856), son of the Danish king Harald Klak
- Guttorm Haraldsson (fl. 10th century), son of king Harald Fairhair of Norway
- Sigvaldi Strut-Haraldsson (fl. 11th–12th century), chieftain of the Jomsvikings
- Björn Ironside Haraldsson (fl. 12th century), Danish noble; father of Christina Bjornsdatter, a queen of Sweden
- Erlend Haraldsson (fl. 12th century), Earl of Orkney 1151–54
- David Haraldsson (fl. 13th century), Earl of Orkney 1206–14
- Heinrik Haraldsson (fl. 13th century), Earl of Orkney 1206–31
- Jon Haraldsson (fl. 13th century), Earl of Orkney 1206–31
- Erlendur Haraldsson (contemporary), Icelandic academic; professor of psychology and philosophy
- Daníel Ágúst Haraldsson (born 1969), Icelandic pop singer
- Solveig Haraldsson (1939–1994 or 1995), Swedish chess master
- Börje Haraldsson (born 1957), Swedish physician and researcher
- Hákon Arnar Haraldsson (born 2003), Icelandic footballer

== See also ==
- Haralson (surname)
