= Haakonsson =

Haakonsson is a patronymic. Notable people with the surname include:

- Haakon Haakonsson the Young (1232–1257), son of king Haakon Haakonsson of Norway
- Harald Haakonsson, joint Earl of Orkney 1122–1127
- Knut Haakonsson (1208–1261), claimant to the Norwegian throne, and later jarl
- Paul Haakonsson, joint Earl of Orkney 1122–1137
- Sigurd Haakonsson (c. 895–962), earl of Lade (Trøndelag) and son of Håkon Grjotgardsson
- Sweyn Haakonsson (died c. 1016), Norwegian earl
