= Harald Eiriksson =

Earl of Orkney

Harald Eiríksson (fl. 1190s), also known as Harald the Young, was joint Earl of Orkney in Scotland's Northern Isles with Harald Maddadsson. He was the son of Orkney chief Eirik Stagbrell and Ingerid Ragnvaldsdotter, the daughter of Rögnvald Kali Kolsson, the former Earl of Orkney. He assembled a force to press his claim for Rögnvald's share of the Earldom of Caithness and was defeated and killed at the battle of Wick in 1198.
