= Braal =

Braal may refer to one of three different usages:

- Braal Castle, a castle in Caithness, Scotland
- Braal (DC Comics), a planet in the DC Comics universe
- Braal, a comedy rock band from San Francisco, California
