= Olvir =

Olvir may refer to:

- Olvir Hnufa - a 9th and 10th century Norwegian hersir and skald.
- Olvir Rosta - a character from the Orkneyinga saga.
