= Haralson =

Haralson may refer to:

- Haralson, Georgia
- Haralson County, Georgia
- Haralson (apple), variety of apple
- Haralson (surname)
