= Háttalykill inn forni =

Old Norse poem from Orkney

- by Rögnvaldr Kali Kolsson
- Language: Old Norse
- Subject(s): Listing of heroes, both legendary and historic
- Form: Greppaminni

Háttalykill inn forni, also known in short as Háttalykill, is an Old Norse poem, attributed to Rögnvaldr Kali Kolsson of Orkney and Hallr Þórarinsson in the Orkneyinga Saga. The poem survives only in late manuscripts. The form of the poem is mainly greppaminni, principally a form of questions and corresponding answers. The style is vernacular.

The subject matter of the poem is a listing of heroes, both legendary and historic.
