= Haraldsen =

Haraldsen is a Norwegian surname, meaning son of Harald. Notable people with the surname include:

- Harry Haraldsen (1911–1966), Norwegian speed skater
- Katrine Lunde Haraldsen (born 1980), Norwegian handball player
- Marit Haraldsen (born 1939), Norwegian alpine skier
- Olaf Haraldsen (died c. 1143), Danish anti-king
- Pia Haraldsen (born 1981), Norwegian television personality
- Sonja Haraldsen (born 1937), now Queen Sonja of Norway, wife of King Harald V of Norway
- Tom Reidar Haraldsen (born 1980), Norwegian footballer

== See also ==
- Haraldsson
