= Harrelson =

Harrelson is a surname. Notable people with the surname include:

== Real people ==
- Bill Harrelson (born 1945), baseball player for one season for California Angels
- Bud Harrelson (1944–2024), baseball player and coach for New York Mets (and others)
- Charles Harrelson (1938–2007), American contract killer; father of Woody Harrelson (below)
- John W. Harrelson (1885–1955), chancellor of North Carolina State University
- Ken Harrelson (born 1941), baseball player and TV announcer
- Mary Jayne Harrelson (born 1978), athlete, 1500-metre runner
- Ty Harrelson (born 1980), American-Australian basketball player and coach
- William H. Harrelson, American football coach at Nevada State University in 1897
- Woody Harrelson (born 1961), American actor in Cheers and many notable films

== Fictional characters ==
- Edward Harrelson, of Japanese science fiction series Mobile Suit Gundam SEED

== See also ==
- Harrelson Boulevard, highway in Myrtle Beach, South Carolina
- Harrelson Hall, building on North Carolina State University Main Campus
- Josh Harrellson (born 1989), American basketball player
- Haralson (surname)
