= Braal Castle =

Coordinates: 58.52135°N 3.48335°W

- Halkirk, Highland, Scotland grid reference ND137602
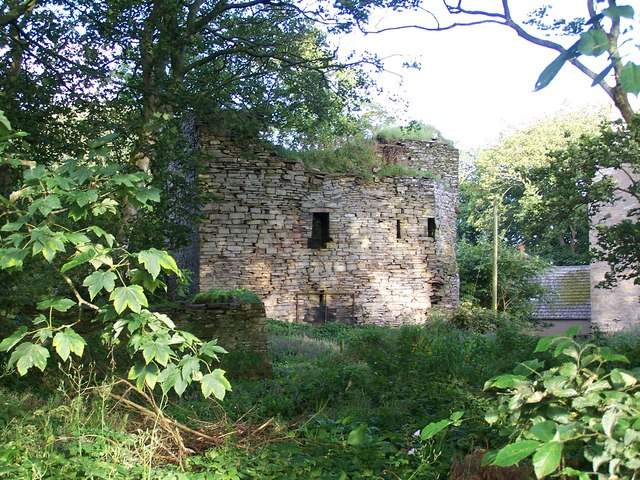
- Ruins of Braal Castle

Site information
- Type: Tower house
- Owner: Private
- Controlled by: Earl of Caithness (14th-18th century)
- Open to the public: No
- Condition: Ruined

Site history
- Built: Mid 14th century
- Built by: Unknown
- In use: 14th century – ?
- Materials: Stone

Braal Castle is located by the River Thurso north of the village of Halkirk, in Caithness, northern Scotland. The ruined castle, which dates back to the mid-14th century, was originally known as the Castle of Brathwell.

== History ==
The site may have been occupied by Harold II of Orkney, Mormaer of Caithness (d. 1206), although the present building is of the fourteenth century. The "Castle of Brathwell" was granted by King Robert II of Scotland to his son, David Stewart, Earl of Caithness. His descendant, Walter Stewart, forfeited his estates in 1437 when he was executed for his role in the murder of King James I.

In 1450, the castle was bestowed by James II upon Sir George Crichton, Lord High Admiral of Scotland, who was briefly created Earl of Caithness in 1452. In 1455, the earldom and castle were granted by James II to William Sinclair, Baron of Roslin and Lord Chancellor of Scotland. The castle passed to the Sinclairs of Ulbster, a branch of the Sinclair Earls of Caithness, in the 18th century.

=== The mansion house ===
The Sinclairs began the building of an adjacent mansion, although construction was abandoned. In 1856 a hotel was built over these foundations. This building was requisitioned by the Armed Forces during the Second World War, and was converted into flats in the 1970s.

== The castle ==
The medieval castle is located on a defensive site, above the River Thurso. The ruins comprise a tower house, around 12 by 11 metres (39 by 36 ft), with walls 2.5 to 3 m (8.2 to 9.8 ft) thick. The entrance is at first-floor level, leading into a large hall. A stair in the wall led up to an upper floor and a parapet walk, although the upper parts of the castle have not survived. The ruins are a scheduled monument.
