= Erlend Haraldsson =

Earl of Orkney

- Born: c. 1124
- Died: 21 December 1154 (aged 29–30); Damsay
- Other name: Ungi
- Parent: Harald "Smooth-tongue"

Erlend Haraldsson (c.1124 – 21 December 1154) was joint Earl of Orkney from 1151 to 1154. The son of Earl Harald Haakonsson, he ruled with Harald Maddadsson and Rögnvald Kali Kolsson.

This was a turbulent period of Orcadian history. Erlend's claim to the earldom was strong, his father having been earl before him but as happened on several previous occasions, rulership of the islands had become divided. (Note: The joint rulership of Orkney earls was a recurring theme in the period up to 1214 and was "inherently unstable and usually ended in violence".) His father had been poisoned c. 1130 when Erlend was still a child and after the death of Erlend's uncle, Paul Haakonsson, the earldom had become shared between Rögnvald and Harald "the Old" Maddadsson. Earl Rögnvald left Orkney in 1151 to go on a pilgrimage to the Holy Land and Erlend acted quickly to build on his inheritance. He obtained half of his father's lands in Caithness from the king of Scotland and claimed half of Orkney as well. Earl Harald refused, so Erlend set sail to Norway to request his share from King Eystein Haraldsson.

The King granted Erlend Harald Maddadsson's share of the Orkney earldom, which led to a series of skirmishes between the two. Erlend had the support of Sweyn Asleifsson, a powerful Viking leader, which enabled him to defend himself for a while against the combined forces of Harald and, on his return, Earl Rögnvald. However, their men eventually killed Erlend during a raid on the island of Damsay on the night of 21 December 1154.

== Sources ==
The primary source for information about Erlend's life is the Orkneyinga saga, which was first compiled in Iceland in the early 13th century. Much of the information it contains about the early period of Norse history in Orkney is difficult to confirm.
