= Haralson (surname) =

Haralson is a surname. Notable people with the name include:

- Hugh A. Haralson (1805–1854), American politician
- Jalen Haralson (born 2007), American basketball player
- Jeremiah Haralson (1846 – c. 1916), American politician
- Jonathan Haralson (1830–1912), American judge
- Parys Haralson (1984–2021), American football player
- Phil Haralson (1851–1934), American lawyer

== See also ==
- Haraldsson, surname
- Harrelson, surname
