= Ingibjörg Hakonsdóttir of Orkney =

Wife of Óláfr Guðrøðarson (12th century)

Ingibjörg Hakonsdóttir
- Born: uncertain
- Spouse: Óláfr Guðrøðarson
- Issue: Ragnhildis Olafsdottir
- House: Earls of Orkney
- Father: Haakon Paulsson
- Mother: Helga Moddansdóttir

Ingibjörg Hakonsdóttir (fl. 12th-century), also known as Ingibiorg, was the wife of Óláfr Guðrøðarson, king of the Isle of Man. She was also the daughter of Helga Moddansdóttir and Haakon Paulsson, Earl of Orkney. Not much is known about her life other than her descent from noble blood and marrying Óláfr Guðrøðarson, king of Man, of the Crovan Dynasty. Additionally, she was also the mother of Ragnhild, who married the Norse-Gaelic King of the Isles, Somerled, from whom Clann Somhairle and numerous other clans descend.

Ingibiorg's marriage to Óláfr Guðrøðarson was strategic for the Kingdom of Mann and the Isles due to Ingibiorg being the daughter of Haakon Paulsson who was a Jarl of Orkney which would help strengthen ties between Mann and Orkney. Ingibiorg was one of many of Olaf's wives and concubines and in many sources Olaf is often written as having another wife Affraic who was the daughter of Fergus of Galloway which indicates that Olaf was trying to shift an alliance from Orkney to one with Galloway which was a rising power in the Irish Sea region.

== See also ==
- List of Manx royal consorts
- Óláfr Guðrøðarson
- British nobility
