= Thormodus Torfæus =

Icelandic historian (1636–1719)

- Þormóður Torfason
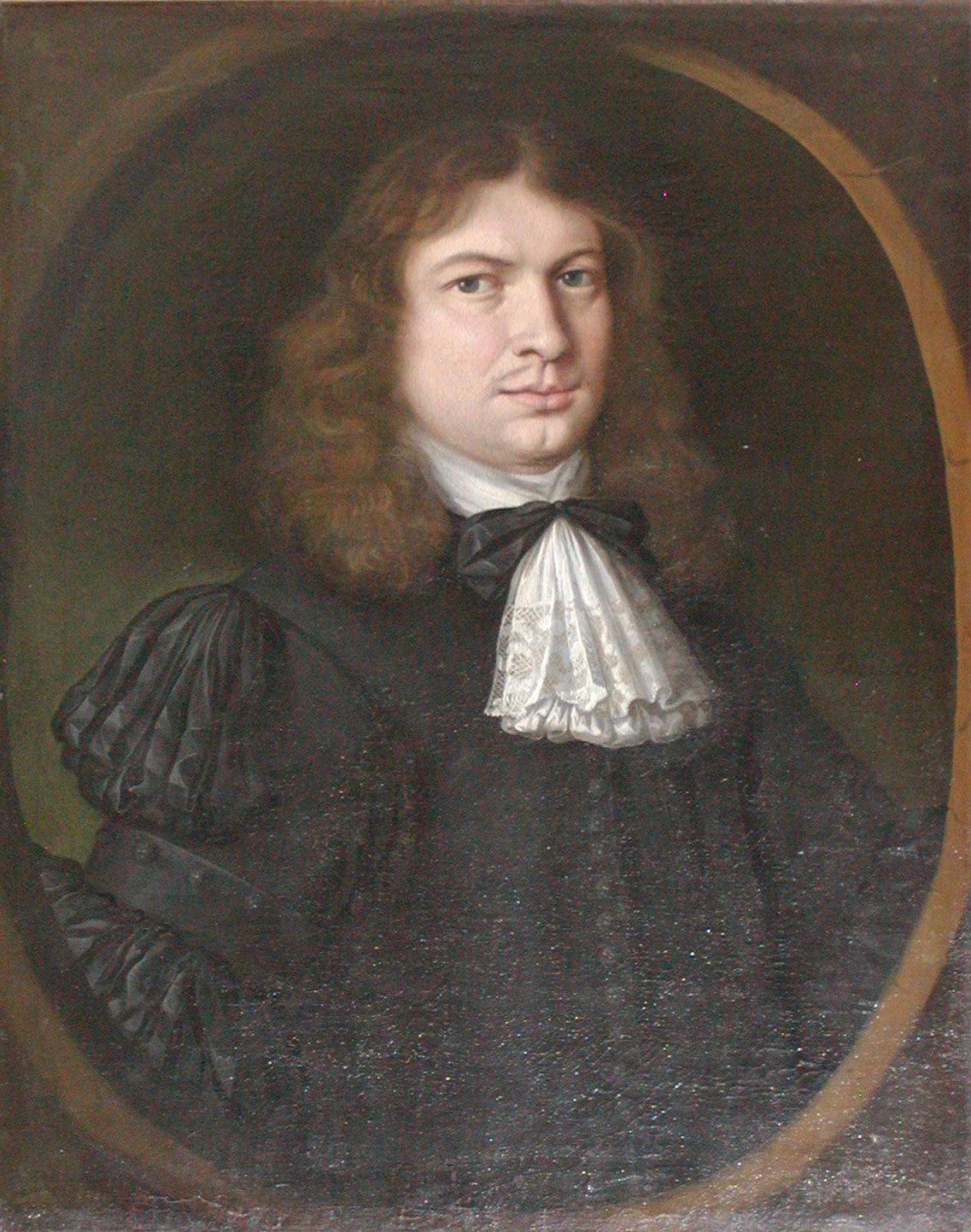
- Portrait of Torfæus
- Born: 27 May 1636; Engey, Iceland
- Died: 31 July 1719 (aged 83); Stangeland, Karmøy, Norway
- Education: University of Copenhagen
- Occupations: Historian, translator, antiquary
- Known for: *Historia Vinlandiæ Antiquæ* (1705); *Grœnlandia Antiqua* (1706); *Historia Rerum Norvegicarum* (1711)
- Title: Royal Antiquary of Iceland; Royal Historian of Denmark-Norway
- Spouse(s): Anna Hansdatter (m. 1665; d. 1695); Anne Hansdatter Gammel (m. 1709)
- Parent(s): Torfi Erlendsson; Tordis Bergsveinsdóttir

Thormodus Torfæus (Thormodr Torfason, Thormod Torfæus, or Þormóður Torfason) (1636–1719) was an Icelandic historian, born on 27 May 1636 at Engey, Iceland, and educated at the University of Copenhagen. He lived and worked for most of his life in Kopervik, Karmøy, Norway. In 1667, he was appointed Royal Antiquary of Iceland, and in 1682 King Christian V of Denmark appointed him Royal Historian of the Kingdom of Denmark-Norway. He translated several Icelandic works into the Danish language and was the author of Historia Vinlandiæ Antiquæ (1705); Grœnlandia Antiqua (1706); and Historia Rerum Norvegicarum (four volumes, 1711).

In 1711, Torfæus's Historia rerum Norvegicarum (history of Norway, written in Latin) was published in four folio volumes. It was the first comprehensive presentation of Norwegian history since Snorri Sturluson's Heimskringla. The work covers Norwegian history, from its earliest beginnings until 1387. The focus—and the strength of the work—lies in the older, medieval history. Torfæus had at his disposal a number of medieval Old Norse saga manuscripts, and he was a pioneer in using these as source material. He reworked this Old Norse literature into a coherent Latin history. As well, he built on a large amount of historical narratives in Latin, both medieval and more recent. Thus, the work is based on a mixed foundation of medieval Old Norse saga tradition and contemporary continental Latin culture.

Through his adaptation, this Norse literary tradition became known to a large public – Dano-Norwegian as well as European. What was written during the next century about older Norwegian history was almost invariably based on Torfæus's work. Ludvig Holberg praised the work as "one of the most impressive and wonderful histories ever to have seen the light." Torfæus died on 31 July 1719 in Stangeland, Karmøy.

A Norwegian state-funded project is currently in the process of translating all of his work into Norwegian.

== Family ==
Torfæus' parents were Icelandic governor Torfi Erlendsson (1598–1665) and Tordis Bergsveinsdóttir (1602–69).

Torfæus was married twice, 1.) on 9 July 1665, to the widow Anna Hansdatter (1620–16.12.1695), daughter of Hans Gabrielsen Kvinesdal and Sofie; and 2.) in 1709 with Anne Hansdatter Gammel (c. 1660–1723), daughter of councilman Hans Pedersen Gammel and Marie Clausdatter.

== Works ==
- Commentatio historica de rebus gestis Færeyansium seu Færøensium, Copenhagen 1695
- Orcades seu rerum Orcadensium historiae, Copenhagen 1697 (English trans. 1866)
- Series dynastarum et regum Daniæ, Copenhagen 1702
- Historia Vinlandiæ antiquæ, Copenhagen 1705 (English trans. 1891, Norwegian 2004)
- Historia Hrolfi Kraki, Copenhagen 1705
- Gronlandia antiquæ, Copenhagen 1706 (new edi. w/notes 1947)
- Trifolium historicum, Copenhagen 1707
- Historia rerum Norvegicarum, 4 b., Copenhagen 1711
- Torfæana (brevveksling), Copenhagen 1777
- Arne Magnusson – Brevveksling med Torfæus, rel. by K. Kålund, Copenhagen 1916

=== Non-published material ===
- Torfæus' copybooks and letters are located in Det arnamagnæanske institut, Copenhagen University
- Handwritten translations at Det kgl. Bibliotek, Copenhagen
