= Matad, Earl of Atholl =

Mormaer of Atholl

Matad of Atholl was Mormaer of Atholl, 1130s–1153/59.

It is possible that he was granted the Mormaerdom by a King of Scotland, as suggested by Roberts, rather than merely inheriting it. However, this is unlikely. If he did inherit it, he inherited it from his father, Máel Muire. According to the Orkneyinga Saga, Matad was the son of Máel Muire, who was son of king Donnchad I and younger brother of King Máel Coluim III Cenn Mór. It is highly unlikely that the kings of Scotland, with little more claim to the kingship than Matad himself, would have been in a position to "grant" the Mormaerdom. It is much more likely that Matad inherited part of a deal made with Máel Muire by the king in order to alienate Máel Muire and his descendants from the kingship.

Mormaer Matad is most famous for being the father of Harald Maddadsson, or Arailt mac Mataid. He married Margaret, the daughter of Haakon Paulsson (the son of Thorfinn the Mighty). Through this marriage, their son Harald would succeed to the Earldom of Orkney (c. 1139).

He is called Maddadr in the Orkneyinga Saga, and some historians follow on from this and call him Maddad. He also features as a witness to charters of the reign of King David I, where he is called Madeth Comes and Maddoc Comes (=Mormaer Matad). Other names originating from the obvious difficulties encountered by his name are Madach and Maddad.

According to Anderson, he died sometime between 1151 and 1161. He was succeeded by another of his sons, Máel Coluim.

== Bibliography ==
- Anderson, Alan Orr, Early Sources of Scottish History: AD 500-1286, 2 Vols, (Edinburgh, 1922
- Roberts, John L., Lost Kingdoms: Celtic Scotland in the Middle Ages, (Edinburgh, 1997)
- Topping, Patrick, "Harald Maddadson, Earl of Orkney and Caithness, 1139-1206," in The Scottish Historical Review, 62, 1983.

Preceded by Máel Muire	Mormaer of Atholl; 1130s-1153/59	Succeeded by Máel Coluim
