= Haakon Paulsson =

Norwegian jarl (died 1123)

- Earl of Orkney
- Tenure: 1105–1123
- Known for: Slaying of his cousin Magnus Erlendsson
- Born: Late 11th century
- Died: 1123; Orkney
- Spouse: Helga Moddansdóttir
- Issue: Harald Haakonsson; Ingibjorg; Margaret; Paul Haakonsson
- Father: Paul Thorfinnsson
- Mother: Ragnhild (a daughter of Hakon Ivarsson)

Haakon Paulsson (Old Norse: Hákon Pálsson; died 1123) was a Norwegian jarl who ruled the earldom of Orkney together with his cousin Magnus Erlendsson from 1105 to 1123. Their lives and times are recounted in the Orkneyinga saga, which was first written down in the early 13th century by an unknown Icelandic author.

== Family background ==
Haakon's father was Paul Thorfinnsson who, along with his brother, Erlend Thorfinnsson, had ruled as a joint earl of Orkney. Paul and Erlend remained on friendly terms until their children grew to adulthood, after which disputes between their sons led to a quarrel and open hostility between the brothers.

Paul, who was the elder of the two, was "very much the one in charge" initially. He married an unnamed daughter of Norwegian earl Hakon Ivarsson and they had two sons and four daughters. Of these siblings, Haakon played the greatest part in later Orcadian events. Their other children were Thora, Brynjolf, Ingirid, Herbjorg and Ragnhild.

Erlend had two sons and three daughters, the former being Erling and Magnus. The trouble between the earls began with rivalry between Haakon Paulsson and Erling Erlendsson. Both are described as talented but also quarrelsome and arrogant. Magnus, by contrast, was "a quiet sort of man".

Haakon believed himself to be the most highly born of the cousins and wanted to be seen as the foremost amongst his kin, but Erling was not one to back down. The fathers did their best to reach a settlement but it became clear that they were both favouring their own offspring, which resulted in hostility between them. Eventually the earldom was divided into two distinct territories, as it had been in the time of Thorfinn and Brusi Sigurdsson.

== Norwegian influence ==
Haakon Paulsson went on a long journey to Scandinavia, latterly staying with his kinsman, Magnus Barefoot the king of Norway. Whilst there he heard that his father Paul had largely handed over control of Orkney to Earl Erlend and his sons and that after a substantial period of peace the people of Orkney were not keen to see Haakon returning. He therefore asked King Magnus for help in the hope of obtaining the earldom for himself. Haakon knew Magnus was power-hungry and suggested that he take back direct control of Orkney as a base for raiding further afield as his predecessor Harold Fairhair had done. Magnus was persuaded and in 1098 he launched a major campaign, taking his eight-year-old son Sigurd with him. However, Magnus had designs that were not envisaged by Haakon. He took possession of the islands, deposing both Erlend and Paul Thorfinsson who were sent away to Norway as prisoners, Haakon and Magnus and Erling Erlendsson were taken by King Magnus as hostages and Sigurd was installed as the nominal earl. Sigurd's rule was aided by a council, with Haakon as a member of this group.

Haakon's father Paul died later that year and was buried in Bergen. Erling Erlendsson died while campaigning with King Magnus, either at the Battle of the Menai Straits or in Ulster.

== Martyrdom of Magnus ==
On a second expedition to Ireland Magnus Barefoot was killed in 1103 and after ascending to the Norwegian throne aged only fourteen, his son Sigurd made Haakon earl of Orkney c. 1104. According to the Orkneyinga saga, Haakon's cousin Magnus Erlendsson was initially rejected by the Norwegian rulers because of his religious convictions. Magnus was obliged to take refuge in Scotland, but returned to Orkney in 1105 and disputed the succession of Haakon. Having failed to reach an agreement, Magnus sought help from King Eystein I of Norway who granted him the joint earldom of Orkney.

Magnus and Haakon then ruled jointly from 1105 until 1114. Their followers then had fallen out and the two sides met at the thing assembly on the Orkney mainland, ready to do battle. Peace was negotiated and the Earls arranged to meet each other on the island of Egilsay, each bringing only two ships. Magnus arrived with his two ships, but Haakon turned up with eight ships. Magnus took refuge in the island's church overnight, but the following day he was captured and offered to go into exile or prison. An assembly of chieftains insisted that one earl must die. Haakon killed Magnus on Egilsay in April 1116. This led to the "martyrdom" of Magnus and the construction of St Magnus Cathedral in Kirkwall.

== Later years ==
After the death of Magnus "Hakon [sic] took over the whole of Orkney and made all those who had previously served Magnus swear oaths of allegiance... and made those of Earl Magnus' friends who had been most hostile to him pay heavily for it in tribute". Having consolidated his position as earl, Haakon then went on a pilgrimage to Rome and then onwards to Jerusalem "where he bathed in the River Jordan". Haakon's mistress Helga, the daughter of Moddan—described as a rich and well-born farmer—gave the earl three children. They were Harald "Smooth-tongue", Ingibjorg who married Olaf Morsel King of the Isles and another daughter, Margaret. Haakon had another son the saga calls Paul "the Silent". Eventually Harald and Paul inherited their father's title "and the farmers had grave doubts about how the brothers... would get on together."

== Interpretations ==
At the time the Orkneyinga saga was first written down Haakon's grandson, Harald Maddadsson, was Earl of Orkney and the writer clearly had some difficulty in portraying the kin-slaying of Magnus Erlendsson. Thomson (2008) concludes that the "assembly" that sentenced Magnus was either invented or heavily emphasised in order to "divert some of the blame from Hakon [sic]". Furthermore, in reporting on Earl Haakon's death the saga reports that this was "felt to be a great loss, his later years having been very peaceful".

== In fiction ==
Haakon is depicted as an antagonist in George Mackay Brown's novel Magnus.

Preceded by Sigurd Magnusson	Earl of Orkney; 1104–1123^{with Magnus Erlendsson; 1106–1116}	Succeeded by Paul and Harald Haakonsson
