= Sweyn Asleifsson =

12th-century Viking

Sweyn Asleifsson or Sveinn Ásleifarson (c. 1115 – 1171) was a 12th-century Viking who appears in the Orkneyinga Saga.

== Early career ==
Sweyn was born in Caithness in the early twelfth century, to Olaf Hrolfsson and his wife Asleif (Old Norse: Ásleif). According to the Orkneyinga Saga, he came to prominence when he murdered Earl Paul of Orkney's cup-bearer c. 1134 in a quarrel over a drinking game, and fled to Tiree to take refuge with Holdbodi Hundason.

In 1140, Holdbodi called on Sweyn to join him raiding the coast of Wales, but they were beaten off; Holdbodi withdrew to the Isle of Man and Sweyn to Lewis. In the early summer of 1141, Sweyn arrived in Man to join Holdbodi, but the Hebridean had been persuaded to join forces with the Norman-Welsh lord Robert who had defeated them in the previous year, and attacked Sweyn. This created a feud between the former friends.

== Quarrels and feuds ==
Some years later, after falling out with his own captains (led by his brother-in-law Thorbjorn Thorsteinsson), Sweyn was driven out of Orkney by Rognvald Kali Kolsson, but King David I persuaded them to make peace.

Olvir Rosta killed Sweyn's father; later, Sweyn attacked Olvir and killed his grandmother, and Olvir fled to the Hebrides.

In 1153, there was a falling-out between the three Earls of Orkney (Rognvald Kali Kolsson, Erlend Haraldsson and Harald Maddadsson). Sweyn, backed by the new King, Malcolm IV, threw in his lot with Erlend, attacking the shipping of the other two Earls and raiding the east coast of Scotland in his company.

The Orkneyinga saga records a raid on the Isle of May by Sweyn Asleifsson and Margad Grimsson, after they had been expelled from Orkney by Earl Rögnvald, that they went raiding on the eastern seaboard of Scotland,

"They sailed south off Scotland until they came to Máeyar (the Isle of May). There was a monastery, the head of which was an abbot, by name, Baldwin. Swein and his men were detained there seven nights by stress of bad weather. They said they had been sent by Earl Rögnvald to the King of Scots. The monks suspected their tale, and thinking they were pirates, sent to the mainland for men. When Swein and his comrades became aware of this, they went hastily aboard their ship, after having plundered much treasure from the monastery. They went along Myrkvifjörð (the Firth of Forth), and found David, the King of Scots, in Edinburgh. He received Swein well, and requested him to stay with him. He told the King explicitly the reason of his visit, how matters had gone between him and Earl Rögnvald before they parted, and also that they had plundered in Máeyar. Swein and Margad stayed for a while with the King of Scots, and were well treated. King David sent men to those who had been robbed by Swein, and told them to estimate their loss themselves, and then of his own money, he made good to everyone his loss"

After Erlend's death in 1154, Harald drove Sweyn into hiding for a while, but he soon regained his power – the saga claims that he raided as far as the Isles of Scilly. By the time Rognvald died in 1158, Harald and Sweyn were reconciled: and Sweyn even became foster-father to Harald's son Hakon.

== Death ==
The circumstances of Sweyn's death are confused. It is clear that the events described in the saga are those of the brief recapture of Dublin from the Normans by its last Hiberno-Norse king, Haskulf Rognvaldson, Chief of the Name of Clan Meic Torcaill, in 1171: but there are many discrepancies between the Saga and surviving Anglo-Norman accounts.

It is possible that the warlord who Giraldus Cambrensis referred to as "John the Furious" was none other than Sweyn. Be that as it may, when the Normans retook Dublin, both Sweyn and Hakon were killed.

== Significance ==
The Orkneying Saga, also known as Jarla Sǫgur Orkneyja, was written by an unknown Icelandic scribe c. 1200. Much of the material describes events that are up to three centuries earlier than this date and its historical accuracy is dubious. However, as the document was written only a few decades after Ásleifarson's death it is reasonable to suppose the later chapters may more accurately reflect the events they describe. In fact, Ásleifarson's activities take up fully one quarter of the saga and the oldest version ends with his death.

He is depicted as the quintessential Viking, a freebooter whose activities include drunkenness, murder and plundering and whose support is crucial to the politics of the Orkney earldom. His tale is closely bound up with that of Earl Rögnvald, a more rounded character who is also a troubadour and ultimately a saint, and it may be that the saga writers were seeking to portray them as exemplars of the Viking lifestyle. However, there may also be a more complex moral to the story. Although Ásleifarson's dying words are "Be it known to all men... that I belong to the bodyguard of Saint Rögnvald the Earl", he also blackmailed Rögnvald and caused him a great deal of trouble. It is possible that the saga intends to cast Rögnvald as a weak leader who was unable to control his nobles.

Another interpretation of the narrative is that rather than seeing these two men as protagonist and antagonist, that together they live in a golden age where the earl is a cultured ruler and primus inter pares but who owes his position in part to his band of "worthy warriors" and is by no means a despot who rules by divine right. In this case the whole story may be seen as a reaction to the Norwegian royal propaganda of the age that sought to promote the central authority of the crown.
