= Harald Maddadsson =

Earl of Orkney and Mormaer of Caithness

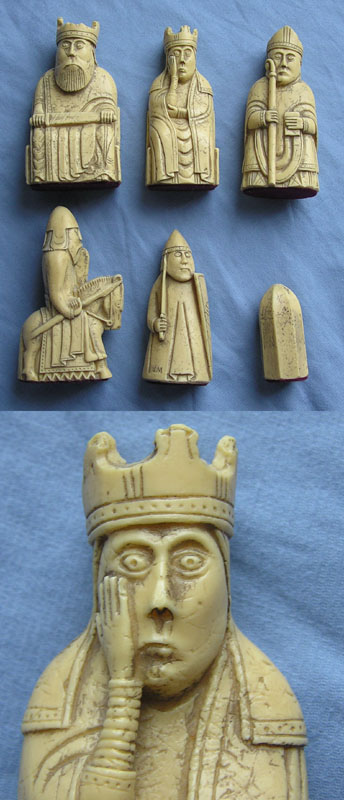
The Lewis chessmen, an iconic image of Scandinavian Scotland in Harald Maddadsson's time

Harald Maddadsson (Old Norse: Haraldr Maddaðarson, Gaelic: Aralt mac Mataid) (c. 1134 – 1206) was Earl of Orkney and Mormaer of Caithness from 1139 until 1206. He was the son of Matad, Mormaer of Atholl, and Margaret, daughter of Earl Haakon Paulsson of Orkney. Of mixed Norse and Gaelic blood, and a descendant of Scots kings, he was a significant figure in northern Scotland, and played a prominent part in Scottish politics of the twelfth century. The Orkneyinga Saga names him one of the three most powerful Earls of Orkney along with Sigurd Eysteinsson and Thorfinn Sigurdsson.

== Background ==
In the early twelfth century, the Earldom of Orkney, although weakened since the time of Earl Thorfinn, remained in control of Caithness and was dominant in Sutherland and parts of the Outer Hebrides. Thus the succession of the earldom was of great interest to the Scots king David I. The marriage of Matad and Margaret is believed to have taken place not long before 1134, shortly following David's suppression of a major revolt involving Mormaer Óengus of Moray, grandson of king Lulach, and Máel Coluim mac Alaxandair, the illegitimate son of David's brother Alexander, and the subsequent extension of royal power into the provinces of Moray and Ross. David's nephew William fitz Duncan was appointed to rule Moray, and it has been proposed that Matad, whose power lay in the Scottish kingdom's heartland of Atholl, may also have been granted authority in the new lands north of the Mounth, and that his marriage to Margaret, Haakons daughter, was arranged with this in mind.

Harald Maddadsson was born shortly before Rognvald Kali Kolsson took control of the Earldom of Orkney, on the disappearance of Earl Paul Haakonsson. The Orkneyinga Saga reports the official tale, that Paul had abdicated, and the rumour that he was killed on the orders of Harald's mother. Earl Paul had not been well loved by his female kin. His mother and her sister, Frakkok, had previously tried to murder him with a poisoned shirt which instead caused the death of his brother Harald Haakonsson. Rognvald represented the pro-Norwegian faction in the Earldom. It is said that Frakkok and her supporters had originally intended to advance the claims of Harald Haakon's son Erlend on Paul's death. However, Matad and Margaret, with King David backing them, imposed the infant Harald Maddadson as joint ruler with Rognvald.

== Early years ==
The main threat to Harald Maddadsson and Rognvald Kali came from Erlend Haraldsson, especially from Erlend's supporter Frakkok. The old conspirator, however, was soon disposed of, burned to death in her hall near Helmsdale. The Orkneyinga Saga names Svein Asleifsson as the killer, and says that he came to Caithness from the south, from Atholl, with Rognvald's blessing and Matad's help. This Svein Asleifsson had also been the man in whose custody Earl Paul had disappeared.

In Harald's early years, when power was exercised jointly with Rognvald on his behalf by councillors chosen by King David, Orkney enjoyed relative stability, although the Saga contains the usual killings and burnings of the time, including the death of an Earl Valthjof who is otherwise unknown. In 1150 or 1151, Harald visited Norway with Earl Rognvald, and probably met with King Ingi Haraldsson. During this visit Rognvald made his decision to go on crusade, as recounted at length in the Saga.

=== Earls Rognvald, Harald and Erlend ===
After Harald returned to Orkney and Rognvald departed on his expedition, King Eystein Haraldsson, eldest brother of Ingi, undertook a raiding expedition from Norway against the Earldom of Orkney. During this operation he encountered Harald near Thurso and captured him. Harald was freed in return for a ransom in gold and by giving his oath to Eystein. Eystein then went on to raid the coasts of Scotland and England.

Possibly as a result of Eystein's activities, King David granted half of Caithness to Harald's cousin, Erlend Haraldsson. The result, as recounted in the Orkneyinga Saga, was a political struggle which ended with Erlend's murder in 1154. Rognvald too was killed, in 1158. Svein Asleifsson was again heavily involved in this dynastic conflict. In 1153 King David died, to be succeeded by his young grandson, Malcolm IV. King Eystein too died in a war with his brothers Ingi and Sigurd which left Ingi the sole surviving son of Harald Gilli. As a result, by 1158 Harald Maddadsson was undisputed Earl of Orkney, with neither the King of Scots nor the King of Norway in any position to contest his power.

== Earl Harald and the kings' enemies ==
From the death of Rognvald, Harald Maddadsson pursued a policy of supporting the enemies of the kings of Scotland, first Malcolm IV, who died young in 1165, then Malcolm's brother William. Of these enemies, those who were active in the north and west, where Harald's power was significant, were Somerled, king of Argyll and Hebrides (who married earl Harold's first cousin Ragnhild of the Isle of Man), the sons of Máel Coluim mac Alasdair, illegitimate son of King Alexander I, himself held prisoner at Roxburgh, the Meic Uilleim, the descendants of William fitz Duncan, and the MacHeths and dispossessed would-be Mormaers of Ross (who possibly were a branch of the ancient Loairn dynasty of Moray and claimants of its rights).

An expedition to Ross by King William and his brother Earl David in 1179 may have been related to Harald's activities. Two years later the rebellion of Domnall, son of Máel Coluim mac Uilleim, broke out in Ross and Moray, and it is presumed that Earl Harald played a part in this. The rebellion was not finally suppressed until 1187.

The defeat of Domnall's rebellion led to more conflict between Earl Harald and King William. After 1187, it appears that Scots and Scotto-Norman nobles were being planted in Ross and in Cromarty, as had previously happened in Moray. The de Moravia family, anglicised as Moray or Murray, which later produced Andrew Moray, were granted lands in Ross and Cromarty, and they are unlikely to have been unique in this award. When King William fell ill in 1195, this may have been the catalyst for the final conflict with Harald, which lasted from 1197 until 1201. As part of this struggle, William granted lands in Caithness to Harald the Young, grandson of Rognvald Kali, in 1197. Harald the Young was killed by Harald Maddadsson the following year.

The Orkneyinga Saga states that King William called upon the King of Mann, Ragnald Guthredsson, to fight against Harald. Rognvald had possibly spuriously claims to Harald's lands, because people remembered that Harald's mother was younger daughter of earl Haakon Paulsson, whereas the elder daughter had married the king of Isle of Man (although Ragnald's father Godfrey of Man had been that lady's stepson and not her own son). Harald, however, retook Caithness at this time. In this campaign, dated to 1201, the Saga tells that Harald came to the stronghold of Bishop John of Caithness, at Scrabster. Bishop John went to meet Harald, apparently to greet him, but the Earl had him seized, tortured and mutilated. The Gesta Annalia reports that Harald tormented Bishop John in this way because he believed that John was an informant set on making trouble between Harald and King William.

The creation of John's see of Caithness in 1189–1190 was undoubtedly intended to extend Scots authority in the region. The new bishopric was not uncontroversial and John soon came into conflict with Harald Maddadson and the Bishop of Orkney, Bjarni Kolbeinsson. The conflict, presented as a dispute over the collection of monies for the papacy (a form of Peter's pence), was appealed to Pope Innocent III, who wrote to Bishop Bjarni and the Bishop of Rosemarkie (or Ross) to prevent John from interfering with the collection.

King William, using the treatment of Bishop John as a cause for war with Harald, brought a large army north in 1201–1202. The army, it is said, was so large that Harald capitulated without a fight and agreed to give a quarter of the revenues of Caithness to William. During this time, Earl Harald's son Thorfinn was captured by the Scots. Whether in revenge for the treatment of Bishop John, or to cow Harald, or because Thorfinn may have had some claim to the throne through his mother (the lady of Moray), he was blinded and castrated, dying soon later in prison.

Harald Maddadson also faced troubles with the Norwegian king. Orkney and Shetland warriors (the Eyjarskeggjar), led by Harald's brother-in-law Olaf, fought on behalf of Sigurd Magnusson against King Sverre Sigurdsson. Sigurd Magnusson was the son of former King Magnus V of Norway and pretender to the throne of King Sverre. Olaf was joined by Hallkjell Jonsson, who had been a son-in law of Norwegian earl Erling Skakke as well as the brother-in-law of King Magnus V. King Sverre and his force confronted the Øyskjeggs in the spring of 1194, when the two fleets met at Florvåg on Askøy, an island just north of Bergen, Norway. In the Battle of Florvåg on 3 April 1194, the experience of the Norwegian veterans proved to be decisive. King Sverre won and both Sigurd Magnusson and Hallkjell Jonsson fell with most of their men. King Sverre appears to have believed that Harald Maddadson was involved in the affair. After the Battle of Florvåg, King Sverre punished Harald by seizing Shetland, which was never returned in his lifetime.

In 1202 Pope Innocent, persuaded that Harald was not personally responsible for the abuse of Bishop John, wrote to Bishop Bjarni to order him to ensure that Harald's man Lumberd, who was blamed for the deeds, was suitably punished. With this, the story of Harald's turbulent life reaches its close. He died of natural causes in 1206 after a long and eventful reign of 65 years, aged about 72.

== The Haraldssons ==
Harald's first wife was named Affrica, a Gaelic name shared with a daughter of Fergus of Galloway. They had four children together whom the Orkneyinga Saga names as Heinrek, Haakon, Helena and Margaret.

The second wife of Earl Harald, the Orkneyinga Saga says, was Hvarflod (erroneously called Gormflaith in some literature), daughter of "Earl Máel Coluim of Moray", whom he married around 1168, and with her he had six children: Thorfinn, David, Jon, Gunnhild, Herborga and Langlif. Hvarflod's father is presumed to have been Máel Coluim mac Aedh (possibly an heir of the Moray/ Loairn dynasty's rights), so that her sons, and it may be that she was the mother of Thorfinn alone of Harald's sons, would carry on the old rival claims to the Scots throne. It appears that King William demanded that Harald repudiate Hvarflod as a condition of peace between them. Of the surviving Haraldssons, David and Jon were joint Earls of Orkney on their father's death, while Heinrek (Eanric mac Arailt mac Mataidh) ruled Ross. Nothing more is known of Heinrek and Earl David Haraldsson died of sickness in 1214, leaving Jon to rule alone until 1231.

In 1222 Earl Jon was implicated, indirectly, in the burning of Bishop Adam of Caithness in his hall at Halkirk by local farmers. Jon was accused of looking on or of fomenting the discontent. King Alexander II undertook harsh reprisals for the killing, to the satisfaction of Pope Honorius III. The writer of the Orkneyinga Saga reported that "The punishments by Alexander for the burning of the bishop, by mutilation and death, confiscation and outlawry from the land, are still in fresh memory".

Jon Haraldsson was killed in 1231, at Thurso in Caithness. He was contested by Snaekoll Gunnisson, a great-grandson of Rognvald Kali, who had demanded that Jon should share the Earldom with him, as had been done before. Jon's supporters and Snaekoll's fought a war until it was agreed that King Haakon Sverreson should settle the matter. All concerned set off to Norway, but a ship carrying Earl Jon, his supporters, and his kin, was lost at sea on the return voyage. As a result, the line of Norse Earls came to a temporary end and from 1231 until 1236 Orkney was without an Earl. In 1236 the Earldom was granted by Haakon IV of Norway, to Magnus, son of Gille Brigte, Mormaer of Angus. Although ruled by Angus, Strathearn and Sinclair lords thereafter, Orkney remained part of the kingdom of Norway.
