= Harald Haakonsson =

Harald Haakonsson (died December 1131) was joint Earl of Orkney from 1122 to 1127. He was the son of Earl Hakon Paulsson and Helga Moddansdóttir. He lived in Caithness after his father's death and was granted the earldom by David I, King of Scots. According to the Orkneyinga Saga, he died after putting on a poisoned shirt that Helga and her sister Frakkök had embroidered in a plot to murder Earl Paul Haakonsson.
