= Rögnvald Kali Kolsson =

Norwegian earl of Orkney (c. 1100–1158)

St Rögnvald
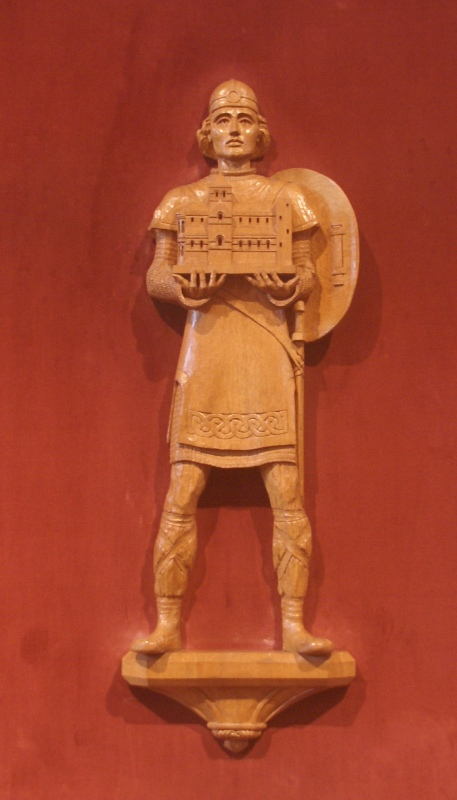
- Modern carving of Rögnvald in St Magnus Cathedral, Orkney
- Born: c. 1100; Norway
- Died: 20 August 1158; Caithness, Scotland
- Venerated in: Catholic Church
- Canonized: Late 12th-century by Pope Celestine III
- Major shrine: St Magnus Cathedral, Kirkwall, Orkney, Scotland
- Feast: 20 August

Rögnvald Kali Kolsson (Old Norse: Rǫgnvaldr; Nynorsk: Ragnvald Kale Kolsson), also known as Saint Ronald of Orkney (c. 1100 – 1158), was a Norwegian earl of Orkney who came to be regarded as a Christian saint. Two of the Orkney Islands are named after Rögnvald, namely North Ronaldsay and South Ronaldsay.

== Life ==
=== Family and education ===
Rögnvald's parents were lendmann Kolr Kalisson and Gunnhildr Erlendsdottir, the sister of Magnus Erlendsson, Earl of Orkney. It was through his mother, Gunnhildr, that Rögnvald had a claim on the Orkney earldom. Rögnvald Kali Kolsson may have been born in Jæren, Norway., but this seems unlikely, since his family resided in Agder and Jæren is in Rogaland. Some researchers think he may have been born near the medieval Fjære Church, located in the present-day Grimstad Municipality. The king's estate at Lista is also believed to be the possible location of both his birthplace and his childhood home. Rögnvald's family owned several farms in Agder where the boy could have spent his childhood.

=== Acquisition of Orkney ===
King Sigurd I of Norway appointed him Earl of Orkney and Shetland in 1129. When he became Earl, Kali was given the name Rögnvald, after Earl Rögnvald Brusason, whom Rögnvald's mother Gunnhild thought of as the ablest of all the Earls of Orkney. It was thought this name would bring Rögnvald luck. Rognvald should have had one half of Orkney as his uncle Magnus Erlendsson had, but his second cousin Paul Haakonsson had just made himself sole ruler of the islands and would not cede any of them.

Rögnvald remained in Norway as one of the leading men of King Harald Gille. Rögnvald was hailed as jarl in 1136.

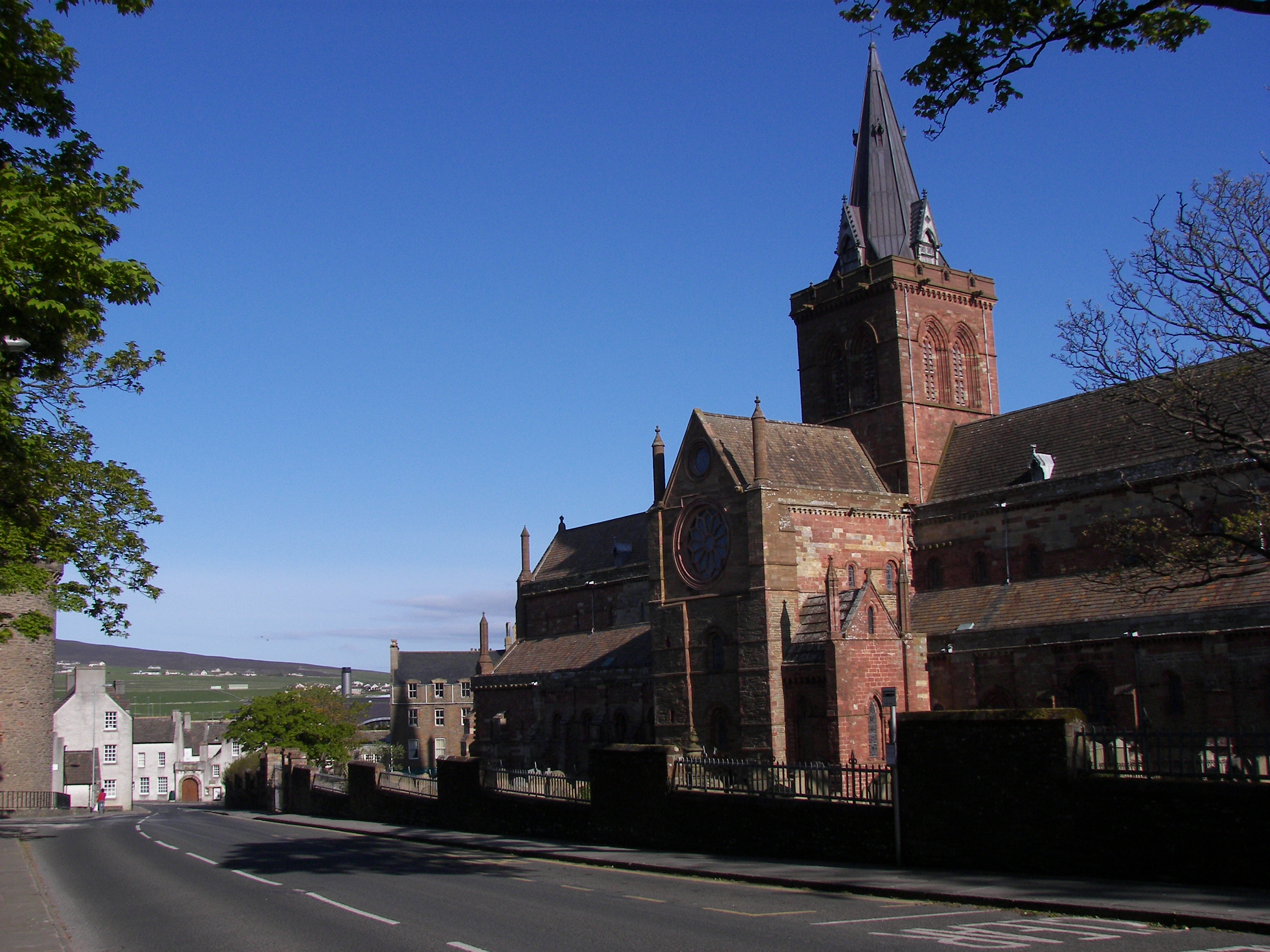
St Magnus Cathedral

In 1137, Rögnvald initiated the building of St Magnus Cathedral in Kirkwall, Orkney. Rögnvald also served as a guardian to Harald Maddadsson, the five-year-old nephew of Paul Haakonsson. In 1138 Rögnvald appointed Harald Maddadsson as Earl along with him. Harald had inherited Caithness, Scotland, and thus was Rögnvald master over this area.

=== Pilgrimage to the Holy Land ===
In 1151, Earl Rögnvald set out on a pilgrimage to the Holy Land. This celebrated enterprise takes up five complete chapters of Orkneyinga saga. The telling about their staying in the Holy Land is very short. It seems that the journey is the important part. But the description of the voyage is dominated more by stories about fighting and feasting. The saga tells that the impulse for the pilgrimage came from a distant relative of Rögnvald, Eindridi Ungi, who mentions prestige as a motivation for taking this large-scale expedition.

=== Death ===
While he was abroad, King David I of Scotland granted half of Caithness to the cousin of Harald Maddadsson, Erlend Haraldsson. Earl Harald subsequently displaced Erlend Haraldsson, who was killed in 1156. In August 1158, Rögnvald was cut down with his company of eight men by Thorbjorn Klerk, the former friend and counsellor of Harald, who had been made an outlaw by Earl Rögnvald for a murder committed in Kirkwall, following a series of acts of violence. His body was taken to Kirkwall and buried in St Magnus Cathedral. Alleged miracles shall have happened at his grave as well as on the stone where he died. Rögnvald was canonized 1192 by Pope Celestine III. But some doubts exist as to the validity of his sainthood, because no existing records seem to confirm it.

== Poetry ==
Together with Hallr Þórarinsson, Rögnvaldr composed the learned Skaldic poem known as Háttalykill inn forni.

Another of his poems, translated by Ian Crockatt, reads:

Vér hǫfum vaðnar leirur
vikur fimm megingrimmar;
saurs vasa vant, es vârum,
viðr, í Grímsbœ miðjum.
Nús, þats mâs of mýrar
meginkátliga lâtum
branda elg á bylgjur
Bjǫrgynjar til dynja.

Muck, slime, mud. We waded
for five mired weeks, reeking,
silt-fouled bilge-boards souring
in Grimsby bay. Nimbly
now, our proud-prowed, Bergen
-bound Sea-Elk pounds over
wave-paved auk-moors, locks horns
with foam-crests, bows booming.

Other verses record events which occurred during the rest of the journey, such as Rögnvald's swim across the River Jordan.
