= Paul Haakonsson =

Paul Haakonsson (or Paul II) was the Earl of Orkney from 1122 until 1137. He was the son of Earl Hakon Paulsson, who had been responsible for the killing of Earl Magnus Elrendsson on Egilsay in 1117. His sister Margaret married Matad, mormaer of Atholl.

Haakonsson ruled jointly as earl together with Harald Haakonsson. In 1137 he was kidnapped by Sweyn Asleifsson on Rousay and taken south to the court of Matad of Atholl, where he was kept in confinement, blinded and maimed, and subsequently disappears from the historical record.
