= Jazz collections at the University Library of Southern Denmark =

Coordinates: 55°23′45″N 10°23′19″E

The Music Department at the University Library of Southern Denmark in Odense has through donations and acquisitions since 1997 achieved the status of research archive of specialised jazz studies.

The Danish Jazz Center closed on 1 July 1997. Much of the collection was transferred to the former Odense University Library, including the Center's public collection, the Timme Rosenkrantz Collection, the Ben Webster Collection, the Radio Jazz Collection, and the Erik Lindemann Collection. A smaller part went to the Danish Jazz Association while that part of the collection which belonged to the Head of the Center, Arnvid Meyer, has been purchased by the Danish Royal Library although it has up to now remained in Meyer's possession. The collections at the University Library of Southern Denmark have been enlarged due to purchases and donations, such as the private collections of Svend Asmussen and Richard Boone.

The collections are housed in the Music Department and can be used during the Music Department's open hours. They are only for use on the premises and are not for loan. A room with all forms of listening facilities is available. Indexes to the Jazz Center's collections of tape recordings and videos and the Rosenkrantz, Webster, and Lindemann collections accompanied the collections and they can be used on the premises. All the books, sheet music, records, CDs and DVDs are catalogued and can be retrieved in the library's catalogue. Current registration is concentrated on the reel-to-reel tapes in Rosenkrantz's collection.

== The specific collections (as of June 1, 2007) ==
=== The Danish Jazz Center's Public Collection ===
This part of the Danish Jazz Center's collection was purchased with funds allocated by the former Statens Musikråd. The collection contains more than 50 sheets of music, 49 books, 1516 78-rpm records, 482 LPs, 300 CDs and a number of journals, some of which are not to be found in any other Danish library.

The collection consists of more than 2600 reel-to-reel tapes, 1000 cassette tapes and 500 Digital Audio Tapes of jazz broadcasts including both music and interviews taped from Denmark's Radio between 1975-1997. These tapes are invaluable documentation of what went on the jazz scene during this period. On top of this there are about 700 video tapes taped from both Danish, Swedish and German television between 1980-1997, spanning from old short films to contemporary concert recordings.

=== Timme Rosenkrantz's Collection ===
Timme Rosenkrantz (1911-1969) was an author, a jazz enthusiast and collector, speaker and radio broadcaster. The collection, which is concentrated on swing music, consists of 1679 78’s, 170 EPs, 1055 LPs, 411 acetates, 923 reel-to-reel tapes and 103 books. The acetates are unique as they are privately cut acetate records with recordings made by Rosenkrantz himself in New York during the Second World War with famous musicians or recorded from the radio. There are rarities as there are many valuable jazz concerts recorded from Danish, Swedish and American radio, which haven't otherwise been preserved. There are also many catalogues, press cuttings and manuscripts for radio broadcasts and articles as well as a fine collection of more than 3000 photos of musicians and orchestras, many of which were taken by Rosenkrantz himself.

=== Ben Webster's Collection ===
This collection contains 45 78-rpm records, 211 LPs, 12 acetate records, 137 reel-to-reel tapes and one book by Ben Webster. They are all catalogued in the library's catalogue. There are some sensational recordings to be found on the privately cut acetate records and reel-to-reel tapes, some of them by Webster himself. There is also a large collection memorabilia in the form of more than 1600 slides, 20 narrow-gauge films, 700 photographs and some private papers.

=== Erik Lindemann's Collection ===
This collection consists of 160 cassette tapes with recordings made by Lindemann at Copenhagen music clubs from 1994-1995, primarily with groups, which are not otherwise found on any records.

=== Radio Jazz's Collection ===
Radio Jazz is a Copenhagen local radio programme broadcasting several times a week. The collection consists of 100 reel-to-reel tapes and 600 digital audio tapes containing broadcasts of especially important documentation value, such as interviews and concerts. It documents the jazz scene in Copenhagen since Radio Jazz started broadcasting in 1987. The library hasn't received broadcasts from Radio Jazz since 2006 because it hasn't been possible to get hold of more digital audio tapes. The library has a complete collection of the publication Radio Jazz, which among other things, registers and reviews all the broadcasts.

=== Svend Asmussen's Collection ===
The library received a collection from Svend Asmussen in September 2003 consisting of 14 LPs, 33 CDs, 25 reel-to-reel tapes, 11 cassette tapes, 2 videos, 8 books and 7 journal issues plus 189 photos and a large collection of concert programmes, reviews, press mentions, posters, and other memorabilia covering all his career.

=== Richard Boone's Collection ===
The library received a large collection, primarily of a private character, from Inga Boone, widow of the trombone player and singer Richard B. Boone, in November 2006. This collection contains many private papers, contracts and photos, plus instruments, microphones, cases, hats, portrait paintings, scrapbooks, posters, and other items, plus 2 LPs, 24 CDs and 10 books.

=== The Other Collections of SDUB ===
Since the introduction in 1991 of a rhythmical line of study at the Carl Nielsen Academy of Music Odense, the library's acquisition within the jazz genre has increased to the point that on 1 May 2007 the collection consisted of more than 900 books, 850 sheet music, 312 78's, 191 EPs, 4100 LPs, 4200 CDs, 179 DAT tapes and 73 videos plus a number of current and ceased to be published journals including older Danish publications. There is a collection of documents in the form of miscellaneous jazz festival and jazz concert programmes from Denmark and abroad, a complete set of programmes from Jazzhus Montmartre (1983-1990), Jazzhus Sophus Ferdinand, Odense (1974-1986), Værtshuset i Odense (1971-1972), Jazzhus Dexter in Odense (1998- ) as well as Brande Bookshops's postal order catalogue of jazz records (1955-1973). The library has also received minutes of meetings, letters, applications and regulations, and other materials from the Danish Jazz Association (1970-1977) and a very fine donation in the form of Ole "Fessor" Lindgreen's scrapbooks (1957-2001) from his Big City Band in all of 13 volumes. Much of the collection has been received as donations and the library will be very happy to continue receiving jazz donations but it reserves the right to take out duplicate copies and give them to the students.

== See also ==
- List of libraries in Denmark
