= Nordbib =

Nordbib is a funding programme to aid and develop Open access initiatives within the academic field in the Nordic countries. Nordbib is funded by Nordforsk; the advisory and project funding body for the Nordic Council of Ministers on matters of research and research education. Nordbib will run from 2006 to 2009. The organisation is governed by a board with members representing the major university libraries in the five countries as well as a NordForsk representative.

== The history of Nordbib ==
In 2004, Nordinfo closed after 28 years in operation. This left a vacuum in terms of a formal body for collaboration between Nordic research libraries and the industry of information and knowledge dissemination. Nordforsk asked the NORON group, which consists of the head librarians of the national libraries in Denmark, Finland, Iceland, Norway and Sweden, to propose an alternative. After some negotiations, Nordbib was launched in 2006 with a budget of DKK 10 million. However, it was decided to utilise a strict 40%-60% funding model for projects (i.e. requiring 60% self-financing of funded projects) and so the aggregate worth of Nordbib would approach DKK 22.5 million when leaving room for Nordbib's own overhead.

== Nordbib's operationalisation of its subject area ==
Nordbib was given three major focus areas (named "work packages") vis-a-vis open access to clarify its mission: Policy & Visibility, Content & Accessibility, and Infrastructure & Interoperability respectively.

== The organisational structure of Nordbib ==
The day-to-day operations of Nordbib is carried out by a secretariat presently composed of a general programme manager. The secretariat is housed by Danish Agency for Library and Media. Governing the major decisions of the programme is a board composed of the NORON group (the Nordic national library directors and library agency directors) and a Nordforsk representative. Nordbib is also helped by a working group that counsels and advises on important matters. The programme group consists of a representative from all five Nordic countries as well as a special representative chosen from a large, Nordic research institution.

== Funding procedures ==
Nordbib has made two general calls for projects falling within the scope of its focus areas; the first call in 2007 and the second call in 2008. Standard requirements for projects were broad relevance for promoting and facilitating Open Access as well as participation of institutions from at least three Nordic countries. The last demand was made in order to foster networking and strategic collaboration between Nordic institutions.

== Funded projects ==
One of the effects of the 40%-60% model was that Nordbib generally only received very few speculative applications for grants. In the end, nine projects were funded and a tenth and final one is being negotiated.

Work package	Projects accepted in 2007 call	Projects accepted in 2008 call
Policy & Visibility	ScieCom Info - Nordic-Baltic forum for scientific communication	OA-barometer 2009
		License to Publish : promoting Open Access and authors' rights in the Nordic social sciences and humanities
Content & Accessibility	Networks and knowledge dissemination in Nordic Asian study institutions	Networks and knowledge dissemination in Nordic Asian study institutions: phase II
	An e-print archive for Nordic arts and humanities (hprints)	
	Aiding scientific journals towards open access publishing	
Infrastructure & Interoperability	Developing an information environment architecture for the Nordic countries	Identifying and explaining digital objects

== Workshops and reports ==
Nordbib has arranged two workshops and commissioned two reports.

Year	Workshop	Report
2007	Workshop 2007 in Elsinore Denmark, keynote speaker David C Prosser, SPARC Europe "Open Access in Europe"	Report "Open Access in the Nordic countries" by Turid Hedlund & Ingegerd Rabow
2008	Workshop 2008 in Elsinore Denmark, keynote speaker Ilkka Niiniluoto, University of Helsinki "Research Visibility: Why and How?"	Report "Current Research Information Systems in the Nordic countries - infrastructure, concepts and organization" by Ingegerd Rabow

== Evaluation of Nordbib ==
In 2009, Nordbib asked consultants Duke & Jordan Ltd. to evaluate the programme with a special emphasis of the structure of the programme. It was concluded in the final report that the structure had worked better in some areas than others. All branches of the tripartite structure received some criticism as did some of the adopted procedures, but overall it was concluded that Nordbib had not only given excellent value for money, it had uncovered and highlighted a special Nordic aspect of Open Access due to similarities in languages and the shared pressures of operating in both small- and dual-language environments, which non-English speaking nations find themselves in. The evaluation report also reflected kindly upon the Nordbib workshops and the Turid Hedlund & Ingegerd Rabow report "Open Access in the Nordic countries".

== The future of Nordbib ==
Based on the evaluation of Nordbib and the challenges ahead with regards to Open Access, Nordbib is applying for a continuation of the programme. The application is backed by a unanimous NORON group.

== See also ==
- Open access in Denmark
- Open access (publishing)
- Scholarly Publishing and Academic Resources Coalition
