= Morten Asser Karsdal =

Danish molecular biologist

Morten Asser Karsdal (born 2 September 1973) is a Danish molecular biologist and CEO of Nordic Bioscience, a Danish drug development company.

== Early life ==
Karsdal earned an M.Sc. in Cell and Molecular Biology from the Technical University of Denmark (DTU) in 1998. He received his Ph.D. in Bone and Cartilage Pharmacology from the University of Southern Denmark in 2004.

== Career ==
Karsdal joined Nordic Bioscience in 2001 and became CEO in June 2010. Karsdal is a noted specialist in biomarker development, including biomarkers that reflect connections between the extracellular matrix and disease biology. He has conducted extensive research in rheumatology (rheumatoid arthritis and osteoarthritis), diabetes and fibrosis.

Karsdal led the development of FDA-approved molecular diagnostics and more than 70 commercialized ELISA assays. His work includes using clinical trial design in combination with clinical use of biochemical markers. He is a consultant to pharmaceutical companies for the use of serological biochemical markers in clinical trials, and Honorary Professor in inflammation research at the University of Southern Denmark.^{3}

He has written or co-written more than 500 peer-reviewed articles, which have been cited more than 21,000 times. He wrote his first book: Biochemistry of Collagens, Laminins and Elastin in 2016, an introduction to collagen and structural proteins. He has several US patents.
