= Vejle Library =

Library in Denmark

Coordinates: 55°42′22.59″N 9°31′13.17″E

Vejle Library is the central library for the library system in the Billund, Esbjerg, Fredericia, Haderslev, Kolding, Middelfart, Sønderborg, Tønder, Varde, Vejen and Aabenraa municipalities of Denmark. The library is also the main library of the Vejle Municipality.

Vejle libraries are organized with a main library in Vejle and central libraries in Børkop, Egtved, Give and Jelling. In addition, Vejle has one mobile library.

Apart from book loans, Vejle library has a wide range of services such as video games, DVD loans or an electronic printing service, among others.

== See also ==
- List of libraries in Denmark
