= Kulturhuset (Randers) =

Coordinates: 56.4603°N 10.0412°E

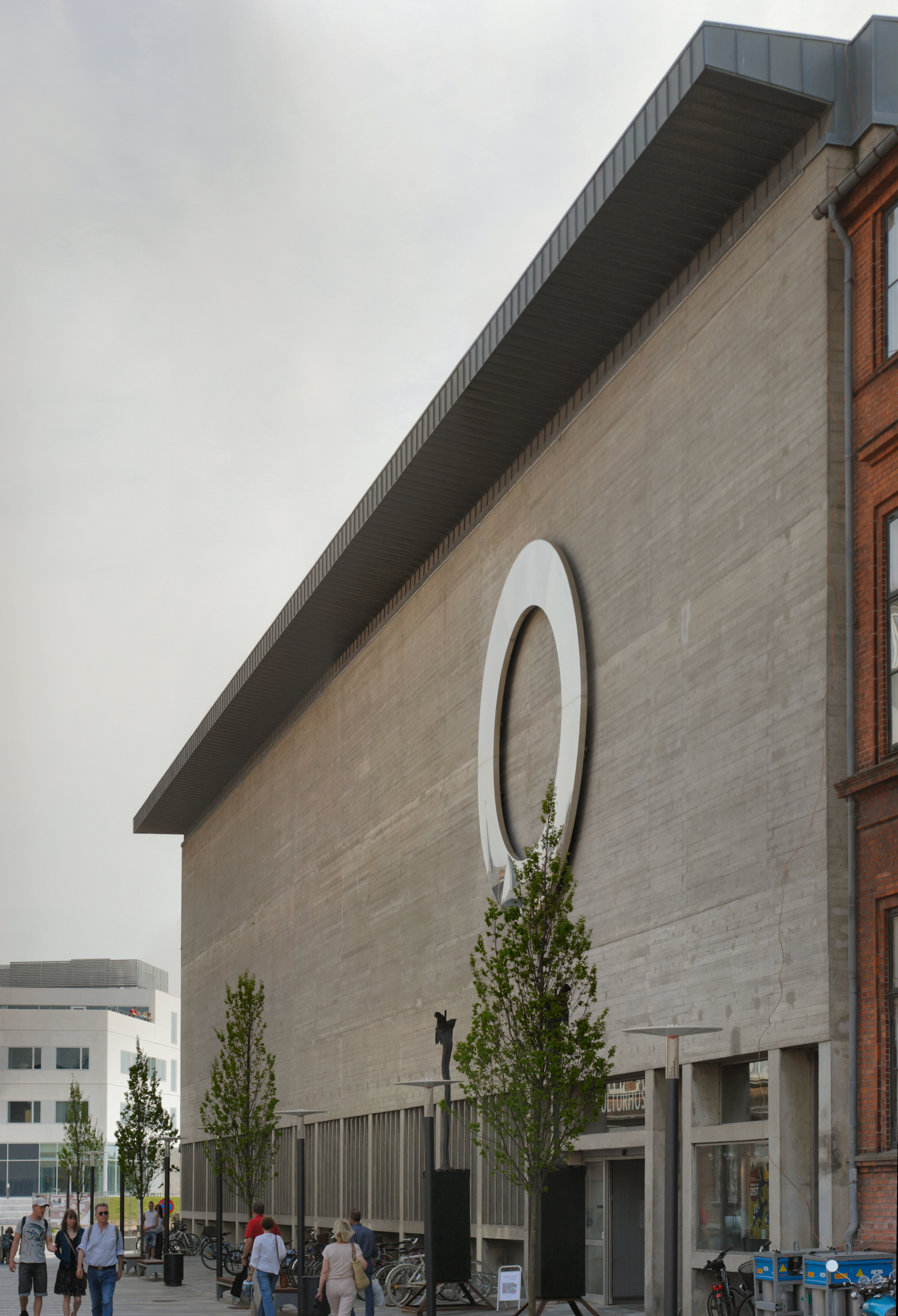
Kulturhuset in Randers.

Kulturhuset (The House of Culture) or Randers Kulturhus is a notable landmark building and cultural centre in Randers, Denmark.

Kulturhuset was designed by architect Flemming Lassen in the modernist style and built in 1964-1969. The name translates simply as "The House of Culture" and it holds a number of important public cultural institutions.

== The building ==
Randers Kulturhus actually comprise three adjoined buildings. The oldest is the former main building for Randers Tekniske Skole (Randers Technical School) from 1891, designed by J.P. Jensen Wærum. Another building was added in 1937, designed by I.P. Hjersing. But what now comprise Randers Kulturhus, was founded by the quadratic modernist concrete structure built in 1964-69 and designed by Flemming Lassen. Kulturhuset has three floors.

Above the main entrance hangs the metal sculpture known as Ringen (The Ring), made by Viera Callaro in 1997.

== Institutions and facilities ==
Kulturhuset holds a number of important public cultural institutions of which the most notable are the Randers Kunstmuseum (Randers Museum of Art), Kulturhistorisk Museum (Museum of Cultural History) and Randers Bibliotek (Randers Library). Randers Library consists of a main library in Kulturhuset, two local libraries within the municipality, one mobile library and a local library in Langå. Randers Library was the first Danish library to offer its guests mobile printing via Princh. The headquarters of the Museum Østjylland, focussing on various aspects of the regional local history is also situated in the building. This museum administers a few museum buildings in Randers and exhibitions in both Grenå and Ebeltoft.

In combination with the institutions, Kulturhuset also contains halls and scenes for meetings and events and rooms to be used by various associations. There is a dining café known as Kulturcaféen, in the building.
