= Randers Library =

Library in Randers, Denmark

- Randers Bibliotek
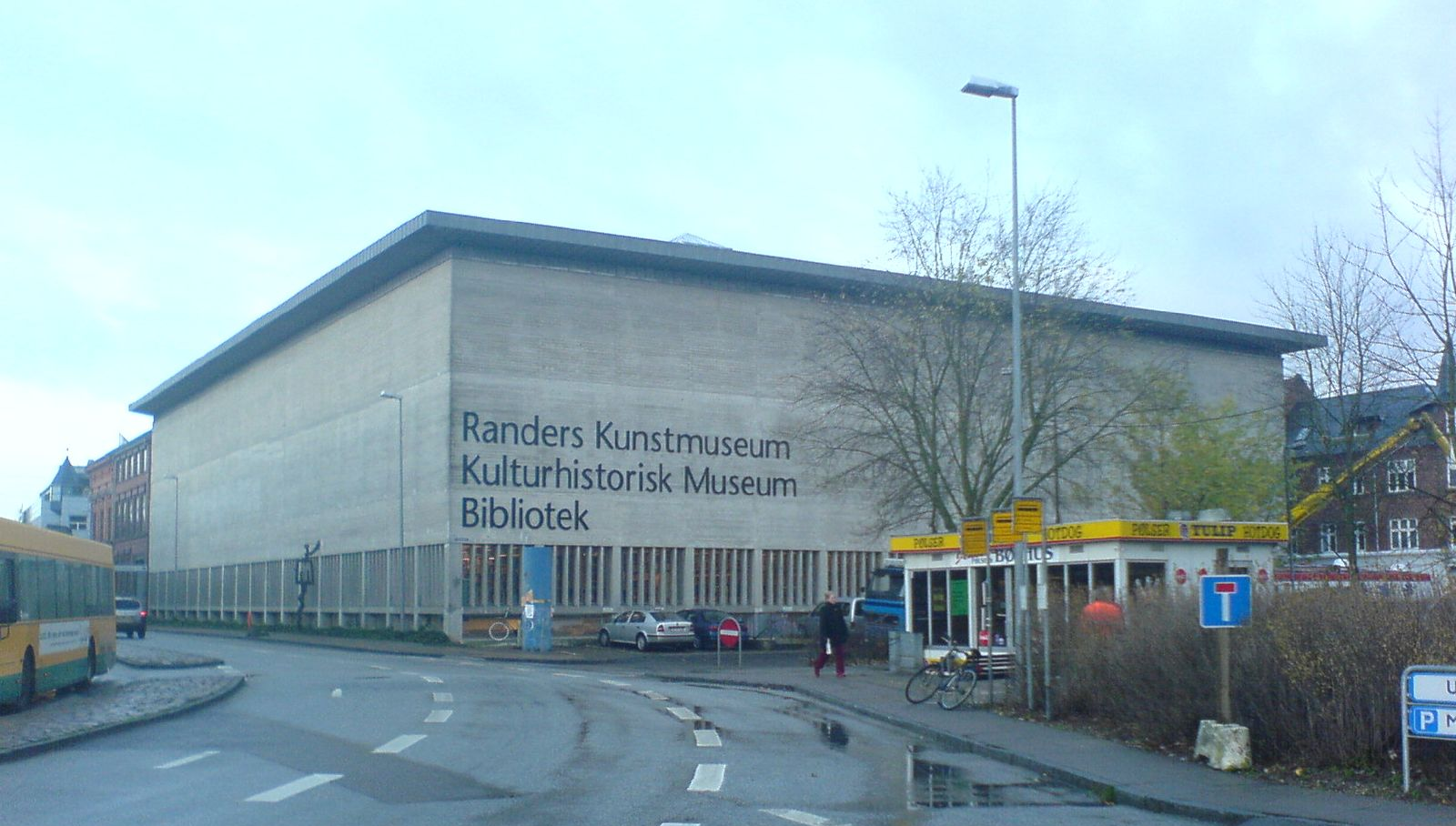
- Kulturhuset, including Randers Library
- 56.46067797081129°N 10.04164787719779°E
- Location: Randers Municipality, Denmark
- Type: Public library

Other information
- Website: https://www.randersbib.dk/

Randers Library (Danish: Randers Bibliotek) is the main public library in Randers Municipality, Denmark. It is in the Kulturhuset (The House of Culture), and consists of the main library in Randers, a mobile library and three other libraries around the municipality. It is closed during national and religious holidays. The library was the first in Denmark to offer ebook loans to its users.

From 1 January 2007, the name was changed from Randersegnens Libraries to the Randers Library. Randersegnens Libraries were a library association between Nørhald, Purhus, Randers, Rougsø and Sønderhald Municipalities in the period from 1970 to the end of 2006.

== History ==
In 1862, the first public library in Randers was established with free access. The library, which was driven by volunteers, had as mission statement: "to provide city impecunious inhabitants free access to the reading of edifying, instructive or entertaining books." There were 488 volumes in the library in 1862. By 1915, there were nearly 5000 volumes and 455 patrons. By 1925, the number of patrons and books doubled, while lending figure was tripled. From 1862 to 1897, the library was located in a room downtown. In 1897, the library moved to a room in the restored Helligåndshuset.

In November 1927, at the association's 65th birthday, the library was taken over by Randers town municipality. A contemporary mobile library was put into use in 1938. The collection comprised some 36,000 volumes in 1944, and there were 6,000 patrons. In comparison, in 2005, the main library, branch libraries and mobile libraries contained 423,600 items (books, CD, DVD, etc.), with a total lending of 1,245.243, an attendance of 706,442, 88.7 staff units and 73,000 registered patrons.

Randers Library stood in the 2001–2007 period behind the Danish Resource Centre for e-books (DRC). Since November 2015, the library runs an electronic printing system for users.

== See also ==
- List of libraries in Denmark
