= University Library of Southern Denmark =

Coordinates: 55.3684°N 10.4277°E

- Location: Southern Denmark, Denmark
- Established: 1999

Other information
- Director: Bertil F. Dorch
- Website: www.sdu.dk/Bibliotek.aspx

The University Library of Southern Denmark (Danish: Syddansk Universitetsbibliotek, abbr. SDU's library) is a public research library at the University of Southern Denmark in Denmark. and has branches in six cities, primarily in the region of Southern Denmark (Esbjerg, Kolding, Odense, Slagelse, Sønderborg) and Copenhagen. The library primarily serves researchers and students at the University of Southern Denmark, but users also include businesses, organisations and educational institutions such as upper secondary schools. SDU's library provides access to books, journals and periodicals, newspapers, maps, sheet music, microfilm and a wide range of electronic resources. The library is home to a physical collection of nearly one and a half million volumes and provides access to over 200,000 electronic journals and periodicals, approximately 750,000 e-books and more than 500 different online databases as of June 2022. The collections primarily cover the areas of research and teaching offered at the University of Southern Denmark, but almost all subject areas are represented in the library's collections.

== Services ==
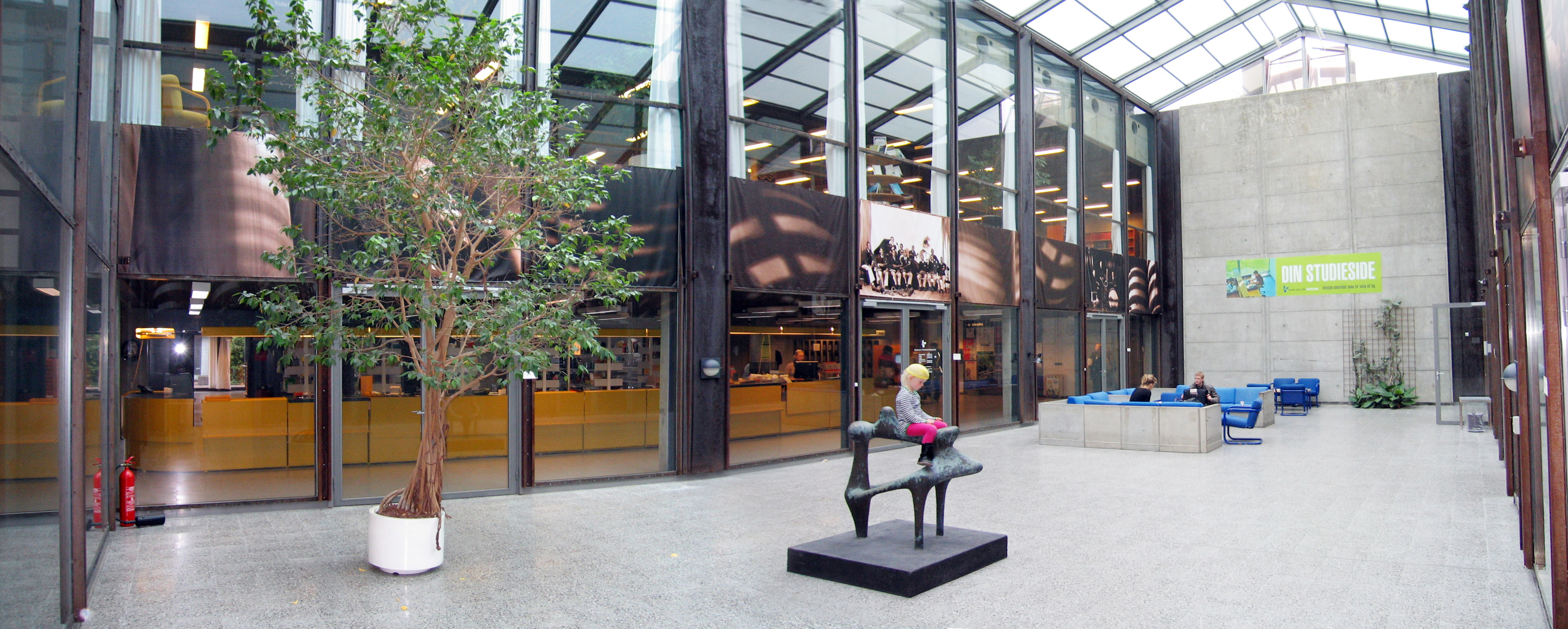
University Library of Southern Denmark - Odense

SDU’s library offers its users a wide range of services. Among other things, the library provides various types of researcher support related to bibliometrics and research registration and has contact librarians responsible for all departments and centres.

For students, guides and LibGuides are offered. Also, the library’s significant teaching activities include advising users on information retrieval and study behaviour in various contexts. The library also collaborates with a number of other SDU units and academic environments to help students in terms of generic study skills. Furthermore, the library teaches students and researchers in information literacy, copyright, responsible research practice, assignment writing and Citizen Science. The library is part of the efforts to realise SDU’s Open Science policy and helps to ensure that a large proportion of researchers’ publications are fully open access.

== Collaborations ==
The University Library of Southern Denmark is part of the nationwide library collaboration and can therefore obtain books from all research and public libraries in Denmark. The library also collaborates with several international partners to provide books and journals/periodicals in print and digital form. The University Library of Southern Denmark also has a strategic partnership with Odense Libraries that covers electronic systems, magazines, upper secondary schools and Citizen Science. For several years, the library has offered a range of academic bridging programmes for upper secondary schools.

== Citizen Science ==
2021 saw the opening of SDU’s Knowledge Centre for Citizen Science, a partnership between SDU's faculties, the library and other partners. Housed in SDU's library, the Centre participates in national and international projects and collaborates with SDU researchers and a wide range of institutions, media and private companies.

== History ==
SDU's library (then Odense University Library) was founded in 1965, one year before the university was founded. In the early years, the library was located in an old shirt factory on Islandsgade in the centre of Odense, but as the construction of the new university progressed, the library opened its doors for the first time on Campusvej in 1972. From 1999, the merger of Odense University, Handelshøjskole Syd, Ingeniørhøjskole Syd and Sydjysk Universitetscenter resulted in the name change to The University Library of Southern Denmark (Danish: Syddansk Universitetsbibliotek) following the merger of the research libraries associated with the four institutions. Later, SDU merged with Ingeniørhøjskolen Odense Teknikum, Handelshøjskolecentret i Slagelse and the National Institute of Public Health, whereby their libraries also became part of SDU's library. As part of its physical collection of nearly one and a half million books, SDU's library houses a number of special collections, including the Herlufsholm Collection (acquired in 1968) and the Jazz Collections. In 2018, a research group at SDU discovered that the special collections included a few toxic books. The ensuing news story went global.

== List of directors ==
- Torkil Olsen (1965–1982)
- Aase Lindahl (1982–2013, appointed temporarily 1982-86)
- Bertil F. Dorch (October 1, 2013 –)

== See also ==
- List of libraries in Denmark
