= List of libraries in Denmark =

This is a list of libraries in Denmark.

== Libraries by region in Denmark ==
=== Capital ===
- Classen Library, Copenhagen, 1792–1867
- Copenhagen Business School Library
- Copenhagen Municipal Libraries
  - Copenhagen Main Library
- Copenhagen University Library
- Danish National Art Library, Copenhagen
- Danish Navy Library, Copenhagen
- Danish Parliament Library, Copenhagen
- Gladsaxe Libraries
- Helsingør Municipal Libraries
- Royal Danish Academy of Fine Arts, School of Architecture Library, Copenhagen
- Royal Library, Denmark, Copenhagen
  - Black Diamond (library)
- Technical University of Denmark Library, Lyngby
- Women Readers' Association, Copenhagen, 1872-1945 (Danish: Kvindelig Læseforening)

=== Central ===
- Aarhus Municipality Libraries
- Herning Public Libraries
- Randers Library
- State and University Library, Denmark, Aarhus
- Viborg Public Libraries

=== North ===
- Aalborg Public Libraries (Danish: Aalborg Bibliotekerne)
- Aalborg University Library

=== Southern ===
- Esbjerg Municipality Libraries
- Kolding Libraries
- Odense Central Library
- University Library of Southern Denmark
- Vejle Library

=== Zealand ===
- Nota (library), Danish Library and Expertise Center for people with print disabilities, Nakskov
- Roskilde Libraries (Danish: Roskilde Bibliotekerne)
- Roskilde University Library

== Libraries in the Faroe Islands ==
- National Library of the Faroe Islands

== Libraries in Greenland ==
- Public and National Library of Greenland

== See also ==
- Danish literature
- Danish National Library Authority, 1920–2012
- List of archives in Denmark
- Mass media in Denmark
- Open access in Denmark
- Royal Danish Library
