= University of Southern Denmark =

University in Denmark

- Syddansk Universitet
- Motto: Fructus Increscit Opera Novo In Agro. (Not officially in use but inherited from Odense University)
- Motto in English: The fruit grows by work in the new field
- Type: Public
- Established: 1998; 28 years ago
- Affiliations: EUA
- Rector: Jens Ringsmose
- Administrative staff: 4,128 (2026)
- Students: 19,287 (2026)
- Location: Odense, Esbjerg, Kolding, Sønderborg, Copenhagen, Slagelse (Until 2027), Vejle (From 2026), Denmark; 55°22′7″N 10°25′41″E
- Campus: Odense Esbjerg Kolding Sønderborg Slagelse Copenhagen Vejle
- Colors: Black and white
- Nickname: SDU
- Website: sdu.dk

The University of Southern Denmark (Danish: Syddansk Universitet, lit. 'South Danish University', abbr. SDU) has campuses located in Southern Denmark and on Zealand. It offers a number of joint programmes in co-operation with the University of Flensburg and Kiel University. Contacts with regional industries and the international scientific community are strong.

With its 19,287 enrolled students (as of 2026), the university is both the third-largest and, given its roots from Odense University, the third-oldest Danish university (fourth if one includes the Technical University of Denmark). Since the introduction of the ranking systems in 2012, the University of Southern Denmark has been ranked between 36th (2012), 38th (2013), 37th (2014), and 44th (2015) in the world by the Times Higher Education World University Rankings in the Top 100 Universities Under 50 List. It is also one of the Top 50 Universities Under 50 according to QS World University Rankings from 2012-2015.

== History ==
The University of Southern Denmark was established in 1998 when Odense University, the Southern Denmark School of Business and Engineering and the South Jutland University Centre were merged. The University Library of Southern Denmark was also merged with the university in 1998.

In 2006, the Odense University College of Engineering was merged into the university and renamed as the Faculty of Engineering. In June 2009, SDU banned smoking during written examinations and in August that year tightened its alcohol policy; both measures were opposed by Freja Brandhøj, head of Syddanske Studerende. On 28 November that year, several hundred students participated in a boycott of the university canteen, calling for lower prices.

In 2007, the Business School Centre in Slagelse (Handelshøjskolecentret Slagelse) and the National Institute of Public Health (Statens Institut for Folkesundhed) were also merged into the University of Southern Denmark. Princess Marie became a patron of the university in 2009, and participated in the annual party during several years.

University rankings

Global – Overall
- ARWU World: 301-400 (2026)
- CWUR World: 292 (2026)
- CWTS World: 329 (2025)
- QS World: 283 (2027)
- THE World: 251-300 (2026)
- USNWR Global: 255 (2025)

After being located in different parts of Odense for several years, a brand new Faculty of Engineering building physically connected to the main Odense Campus was established and opened in 2015. The University Library of Southern Denmark was also merged with the university in 1998. As the original Odense University was established in 1966, the University of Southern Denmark celebrated their 50-year anniversary on September 15, 2016. The queen of Denmark visited SDU in October of that year.

== Administration and organization ==
The university is governed by a board consisting of 9 members: 5 members recruited outside the university form the majority of the board, 1 member is appointed by the scientific staff, 1 member is appointed by the administrative staff, and 2 members are appointed by the students. The rector is appointed by the university board. The rector in turn appoints deans, and deans appoint heads of departments. There is no faculty senate and faculty is not involved in the appointment of rector, deans, or department heads. Hence, the university has no faculty governance.

The current rector is Jens Ringsmose, and the current Pro-vice-chancellor (Danish: Prorektor) is Helle Waagepetersen.

== Campuses ==
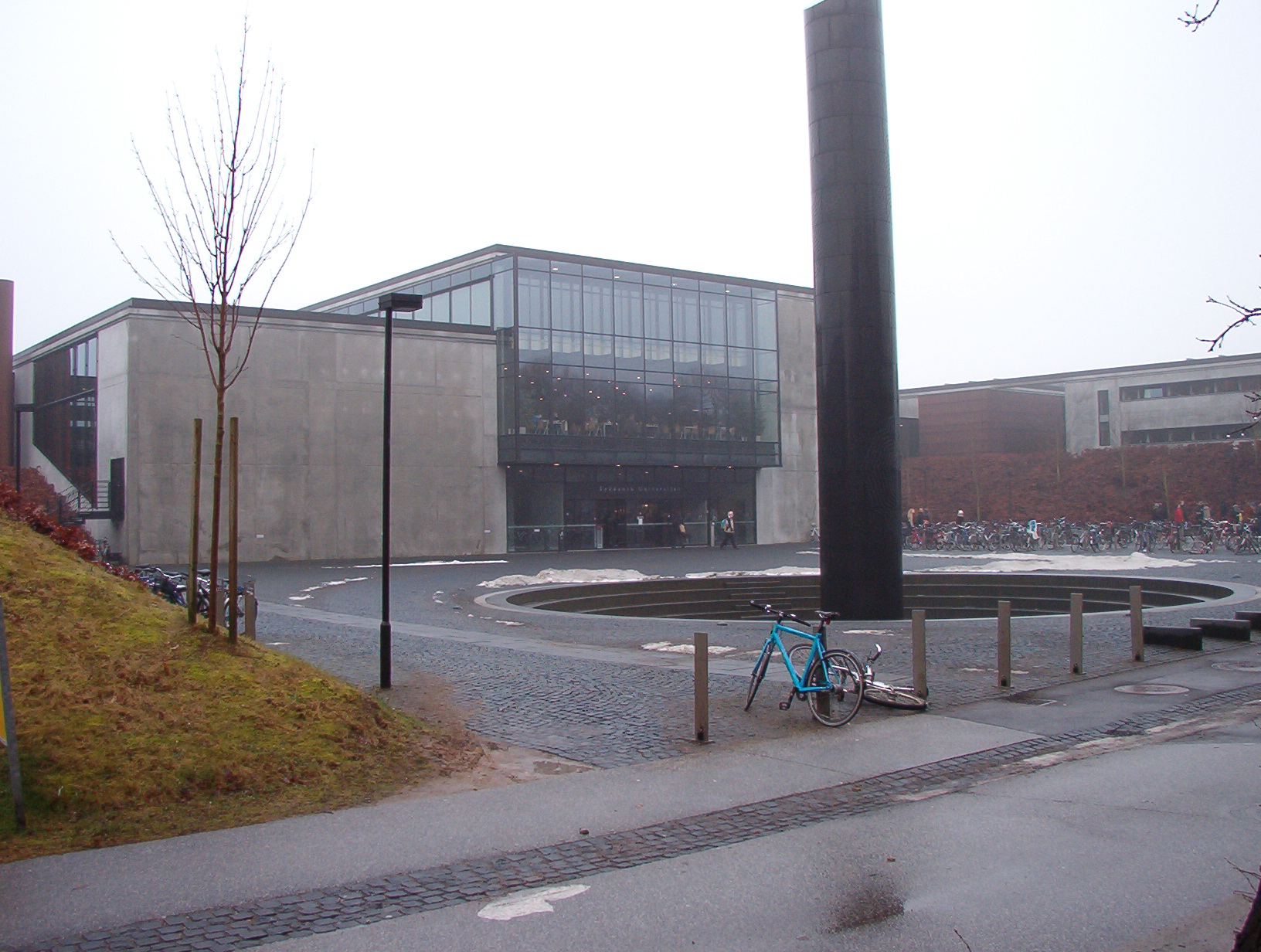
The university's campus Odense, also known as The Rusty Castle

The University of Southern Denmark has six campuses, mainly located in the southern part of Denmark: Campus Odense on the island of Funen, Campus Slagelse and Campus Copenhagen on the island of Zealand, as well as Campus Kolding, Campus Esbjerg, Campus Alsion in Sønderborg and from 2026 Campus Vejle, all on the Jutland peninsula.

The campus in Slagelse is officially being discontinued as of 2027, with the university citing issues finding another institution interested in taking over.

The physical buildings of SDU cover an area of 272,554 m^{2} (2007), a figure that has increased from 181,450 m^{2} in 1999 when the university merger was implemented.

The university of Southern Denmark is an active member of the University of the Arctic. UArctic is an international cooperative network based in the Circumpolar Arctic region, consisting of more than 200 universities, colleges, and other organizations with an interest in promoting education and research in the Arctic region.

The university participates in UArctic's mobility program, north2north. The aim of that program is to enable students of member institutions to study in different parts of the North.

== See also ==
- Open access in Denmark
