= Danish National Library Authority =

Danish government agency on public libraries

National Library Authority

Agency overview
- Formed: 5 March 1920
- Dissolved: 1 January 2012; 14 years ago
- Superseding agency: Agency for Culture
- Jurisdiction: Government of Denmark
- Parent department: Ministry of Culture

The Danish National Library Authority (Danish: Biblioteksstyrelse) was a Danish government agency which oversaw public libraries and research libraries under the authority of the Ministry of Culture. The agency's first iteration, the Statens Bibliotekstilsyn had been established in 1920. In 2012, the agency was merged into the Danish Agency for Culture.

The agency was charged with coordinating the Danish library service across municipal and governmental sectors, administrating the national standards for cataloguing and classification, and overseeing bibliotek.dk, the national online library catalogue. It was responsible for the administration of the state's Library Services Act and providing grants to authors through a Public Lending Right program. Apart from the duties it carried out under the Library Services Act, the agency had no formal executive power and pursued the development of new services primarily through temporary strategic grants.

== History ==
The Statens Bibliotekstilsyn (English: State Inspectorate of Public Libraries) was created on 5 March 1920, following the first Danish library act, law no. 160 of the same date. The object of the inspectorate was to implement the law. In practice this meant administrating annual government grants to the public libraries and to advise on collections, premises and staff and to keep a watch on whether the local authorities complied with the regulations in the library act. From 1920–1961, the agency was under the Ministry of Education. In 1964, it changed name to Bibliotekstilsynet.

In 1986, the Rigsbibliotekarembedet (English: Office of the National Librarian), which had been created in 1943 within the Danish Royal Library, became an independent national institution. It was merged with Bibliotekstilsynet in 1990 to form Statens Bibliotekstjeneste (English: State Library Service), at the same time that the state devolved direct authority over local public libraries to their respective municipalities.

The logo of the Biblioteksstyrelse, the iteration of the agency which existed from 1997 until 2007.

On 1 October 1997, the Statens Bibliotekstjeneste was transformed into the Biblioteksstyrelsen. The late 1990s saw a shift in the agency's focus towards providing access to digital materials. It oversaw the establishment of the Danish Electoronic Research Library (Danish: Danmarks Elektroniske Fag- og Forskningsbibliotek) in 1998 which, among other things, negotiated licenses with publishers to digital libraries. The Biblioteksstyrelsen also was involved in the preparation and implementation of the amended Library Services Act of 2005 and the revision of the central library structure.

On 1 January 2007, the Biblioteksstyrelse was merged with the Mediesekretariatet to form the Danish Library and Media Agency (Danish: Styrelsen for Bibliotek og Medier). On 1 January 2012, the agency was merged with the Danish Arts Agency (Danish: Kunststyrelsen) and the Danish Cultural Heritage Agency (Danish: Kulturarvsstyrelsen) to form the Danish Agency for Culture (Danish: Kulturstyrelsen).

== See also ==
- List of libraries in Denmark
