= Bibliotek.dk =

Danish online library catalog

bibliotek.dk is a Danish Internet service that allows for search for materials in public Danish libraries. It is a library catalog.

Search targets include books, newspaper and journal articles, LP records, DVD, CD-ROMs, etc. Material from Danish libraries can be requested and sent to the local library.

Dansk BiblioteksCenter (DBC), a state-owned limited liability company, develops and maintains the service.

== See also ==
- Danish National Library Authority
