= Timme Rosenkrantz =

Danish jazz enthusiast (1911–1969)

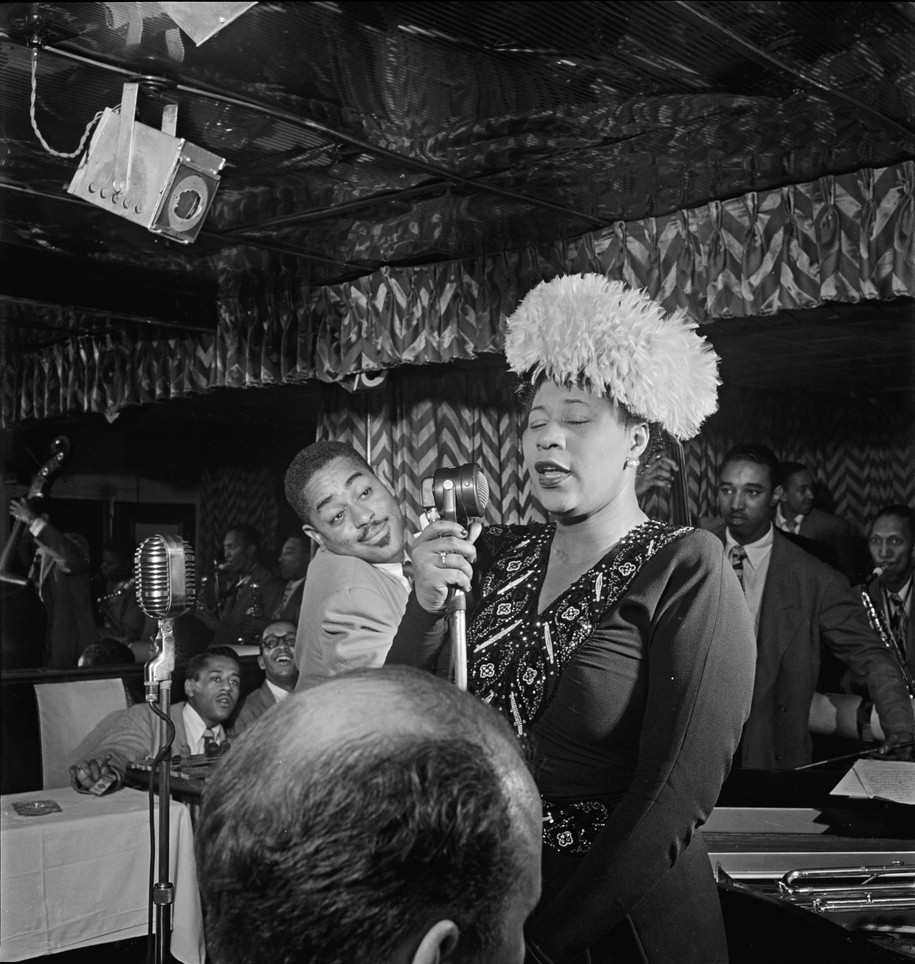
Ella Fitzgerald, Dizzy Gillespie, Ray Brown, Milt Jackson, and Timme Rosenkrantz (head in the foreground), Downbeat, New York, c. Sept. 1947. Photography by William P. Gottlieb.

Baron Timme Rosenkrantz (6 July 1911 – 11 August 1969) was a Danish aristocrat, author and jazz enthusiast. He was an early supporter of African American jazz musicians and promoted many concerts and recordings. He also produced a 1938 session for the Victor label, assembling Rex Stewart, Don Byas, Russell Procope, Tyree Glenn, Jo Jones and others as Timme Rosenkrantz and His Barrelhouse Barons. His private 1944 acetates of Erroll Garner, which subsequently saw release on Blue Note and other labels, were the pianist's first recordings. Rosenkrantz organized the 1946 European tour of an all-star band led by Don Redman, the first American jazz group to visit Copenhagen and Stockholm after World War II. A man of great humor, Rosenkrantz wrote witty short stories and vignettes for a number of publications, including Esquire magazine. His collection of jazz music (concentrated on the Swing Era) is placed in the Jazz collections at the University Library of Southern Denmark, Odense.

Before Rosenkrantz died, he wrote down his memories in a Danish book and in several Danish and English articles. Fradley Garner, International Editor of Jersey Jazz and a friend of Rosenkrantz, translated and edited the Baron's memoirs for the English-speaking world. The resulting book, Harlem Jazz Adventures, is now available via the book's website at JazzBaron.com.

== Additional reading ==
- Mike Matloff, "The Jazz Baron"
- Timme Rosenkrantz, Harlem Jazz Adventures A European Baron's Memoir, 1934–1969 (Lanham, MD, Scarecrow Press, 2012).
