= List of archives in Denmark =

This is list of archives in Denmark.

== Archives in Denmark ==
- Danish National Archives
- Danish Emigration Archives

== Former archives ==
The following archives have since been integrated into the Danish National Archives:

- Danish National Business Archives
- Danish Data Archive
- Provincial Archives of Funen
- Provincial Archives of Northern Jutland
- Provincial Archives of Southern Jutland
- Provincial Archives of Zealand

== See also ==
- List of archives
- List of libraries in Denmark
- List of museums in Denmark
- Culture of Denmark
