= Danish National Art Library =

National research library

Coordinates: 55.6798°N 12.5882°E

- Danmarks Kunstbibliotek
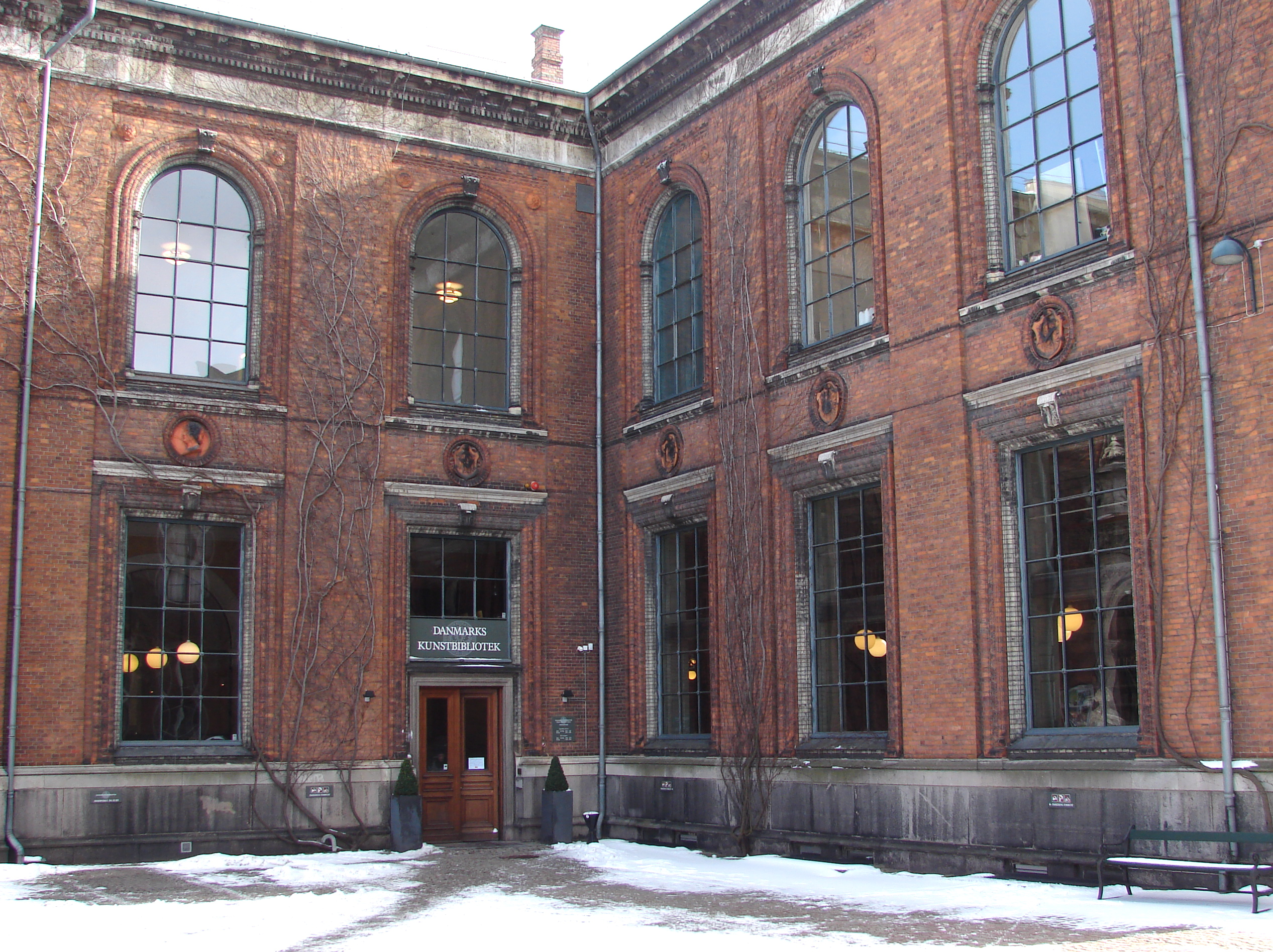
- The Danish National Art Library's main entrance
- Location: Copenhagen, Copenhagen, Denmark
- Type: Research Library
- Established: 1754 (272 years ago)

Other information
- Director: Steen Søndergaard Thomsen
- Employees: 14
- Website: www.kunstbib.dk/en

The Danish National Art Library (Danish: Danmarks Kunstbibliotek) is the national research library for architecture, art history, visual arts and museology in Denmark. It was founded in 1754 as part of the Royal Danish Academy of Fine Arts and has been located at Charlottenborg's Nyhavn Wing in Copenhagen. It became an independent, self-owning institution in 1996. The library is a member of the Danish Association of Research Libraries.

== Collections ==
The Danish National Art Library has the largest Nordic collection of art-historical literature (over 300.000 volumes). It continues to grow as it has done since 1754. The collection covers a qualitative selection of books on architecture, visual arts, art history and theory, together with interdisciplinary museology.

=== Architectural renderings ===
The collection of architectural drawings consists approximately 300,000 items dating covering the period from the mid16th century until the present day. Approximately 14,000 drawings have been so far been digitalized. The library collects renderings from Danish architects, both realized and unrealized, measurings of national and foreign architecture, drawings from the architectural school and travel sketches.

== Facilities ==
The library has a reading room in its main branch at Nyhavn 2 in central Copenhagen. Tare and fragile materials such as rare books and architectural drawings can only be studied in a special study room in Søborg.

== See also ==
- List of libraries in Denmark
