= Odense Central Library =

Public library in Odense, Denmark

Coordinates: 55.4013°N 10.3883°E

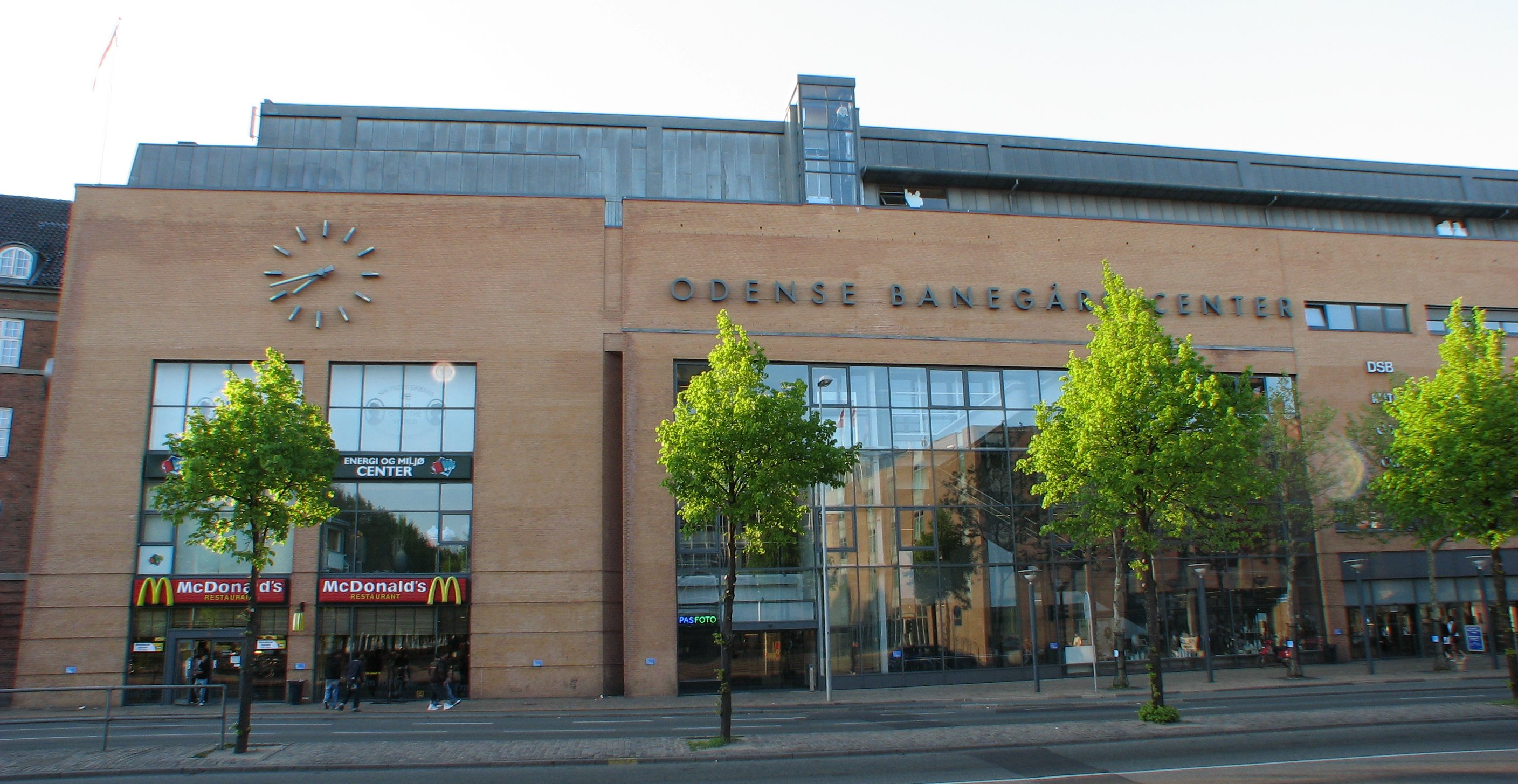
The library is located in Odense station.

Odense Central Library (Odense Centralbibliotek; also known as Odense County Library) is the public library for Odense, Denmark, and central library of Funen (except Middelfart Municipality). Established in 1924, it is an integrated part of Odense Railway Station, as a result of a 1995 re-use project. It is visited by about 1.5 million people annually and lends approximately 2.3 million works. Odense Music Library is a main department of Odense County Library, and it contains the largest collection of phonograms in Scandinavia and Denmark's largest number of titles.

== See also ==
- List of libraries in Denmark
