= Vester Allé 12 =

Coordinates: 56.1547°N 10.2003°E

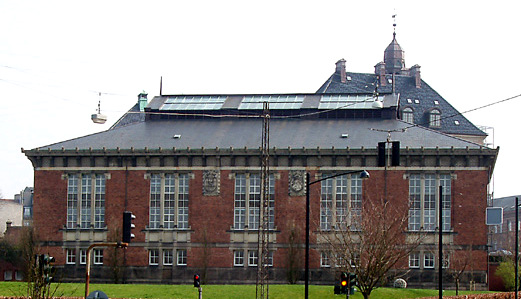
- Interactive map of the Vester Allé 12 area

General information
- Architectural style: National romantic
- Location: Aarhus Municipality, Denmark
- Construction started: 1898
- Completed: 1902

Technical details
- Floor count: 3

Design and construction
- Architect: Hack Kampmann

Vester Allé 12 is a listed building in Aarhus, Denmark. The building was completed in 1902 and was listed by the Danish Heritage Agency in the Danish registry of protected buildings and places on 5 April 1988. The building is situated on the west side of Vester Allé close by Vester Allé Barracks and ARoS Aarhus Art Museum. The building has been home to some of the earliest cultural institutions in the city.

Colloquially the building is known as Smykkeskrinet (The Jewel Box) for its distinctive shape or as Erhvervsarkivet (The Business Archive) for its long tenure as the home of the Danish National Business Archives.

== History ==
Vester Allé 12 was constructed between 1898 and 1902 as the home of the newly established State Library. In 1928 Aarhus University was established and the State Library became the official library of the new university and was renamed the State and University Library. The added functions meant there was insufficient space for storage and the library functions became scattered to a number of locations. In 1963 the library moved to the new building Bogtårnet (The Book Tower) designed by C.F. Møller on the Aarhus University campus.

When the State and University Library vacated the building it was taken over by the Business Archives (later the Danish National Business Archive). The business archive had been established by the city in 1946 as an independent historical institution focused on historical documents related to commerce, business and economy. The Business Archive was taken over by the Danish State Archives in 1968. The archive has functioned in a double role as both the national archive of business records and the local archive of the city of Aarhus since then.

In 2011 Aarhus City Council had established the Aarhus City Archives with the goal of preserving local history and it moved into Vester Allé 12 which it shared with the Business Archive in close cooperation. In late 2015 the Business Archive was moved to Viborg due to a desire to centralize operations. The local historical records was left to the Aarhus City Archives.

== Aarhus City Archives ==
Aarhus Stadsarkiv (Aarhus City Archives) is the local historical archive for the city of Aarhus and the administrative body for all the local archives in Aarhus Municipality. The archives were established in 2011 but operates under a set of regulations adopted in 2013 by the Aarhus City Council.

The city archives primarily collect print or digital documents and data on municipal institutions but also material from individuals, organizations and companies based in the municipality. The City Archives has the position of chairman of the internal municipal archival committee and advice municipal institutions on the use of information technology. The archives is active in cultural cooperation between local archives, museums, educational institutions and municipal administration.

The purpose of the archives is to ensure the history of the city can be documented fully and unbiased.

== Architecture ==
The building was designed by architect Hack Kampmann and was constructed between 1898 and 1902. It is prominently situated on a hill overlooking Aarhus River. The building is in National Romantic and historicist style, constructed from red bricks of lime and sandstone with a hip roof and a balcony. It is adorned with many different types of frieze, bands and inscriptions. Above the front entrance is a relief showing a woman watering the Tree of Knowledge and along the eaves is a series of owls, symbolizing erudition and knowledge. The interior features designs by sculptor Karl Hansen Reistrup who also contributed to Aarhus Theatre.

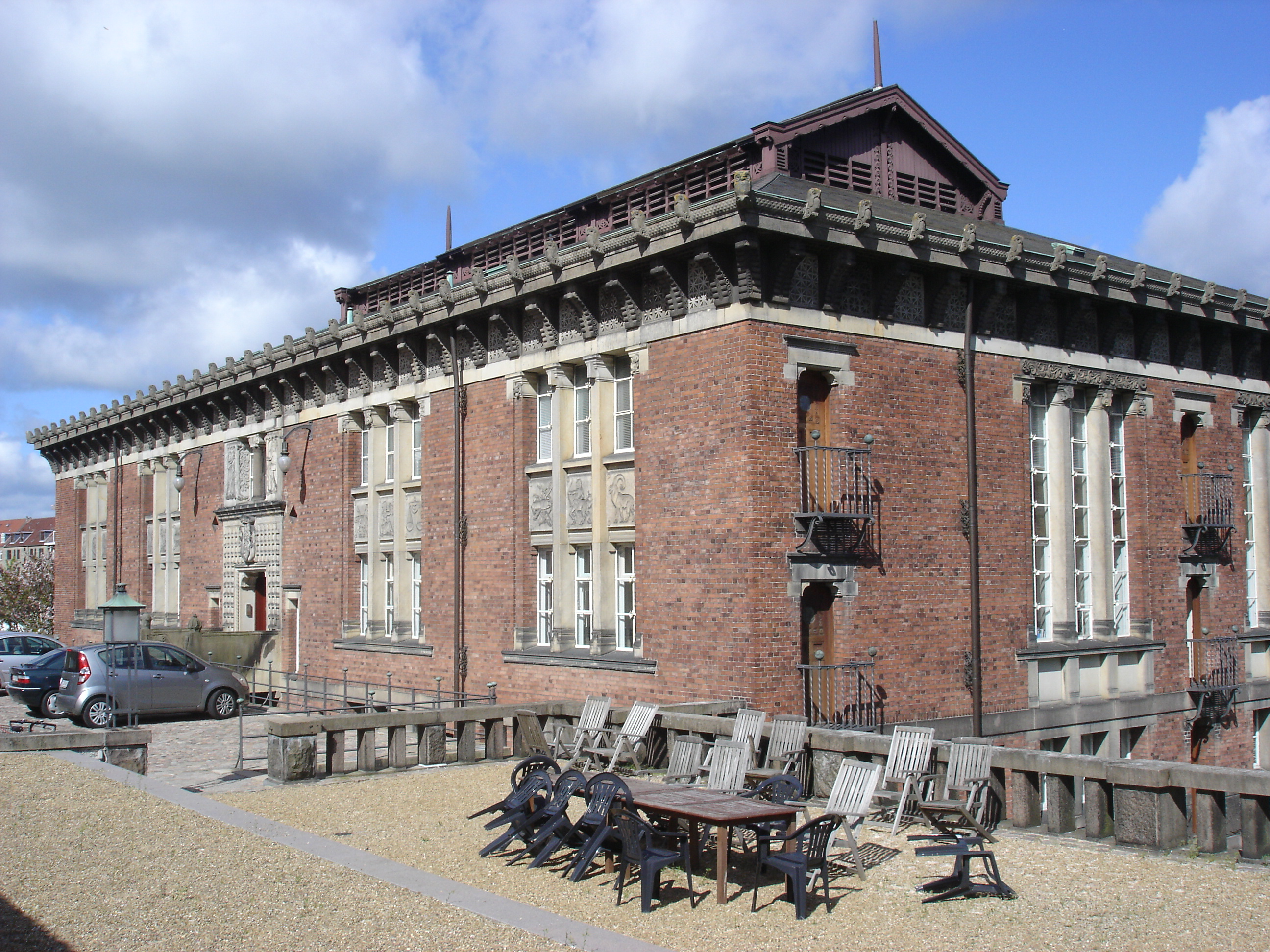
A raised terrace

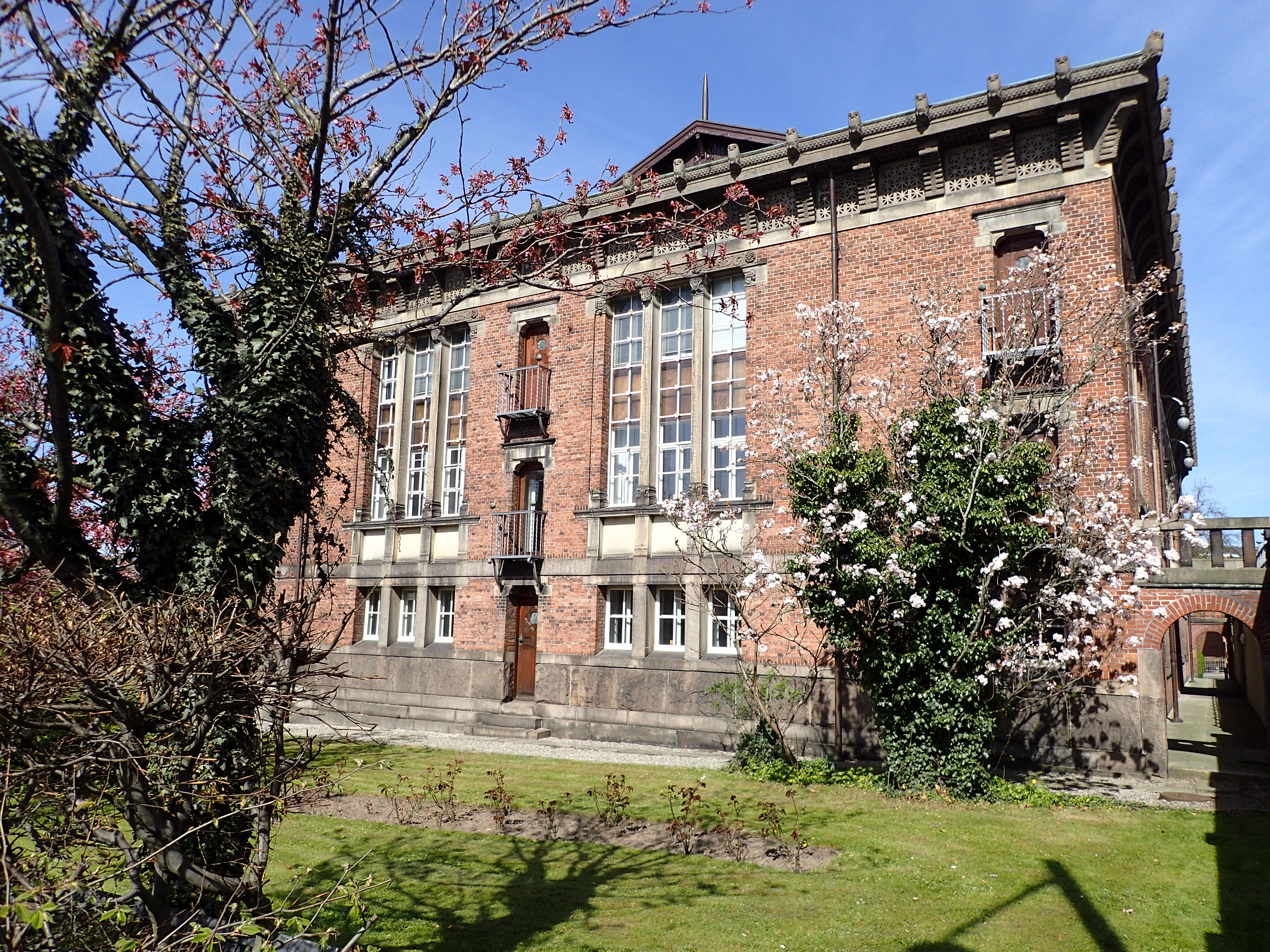

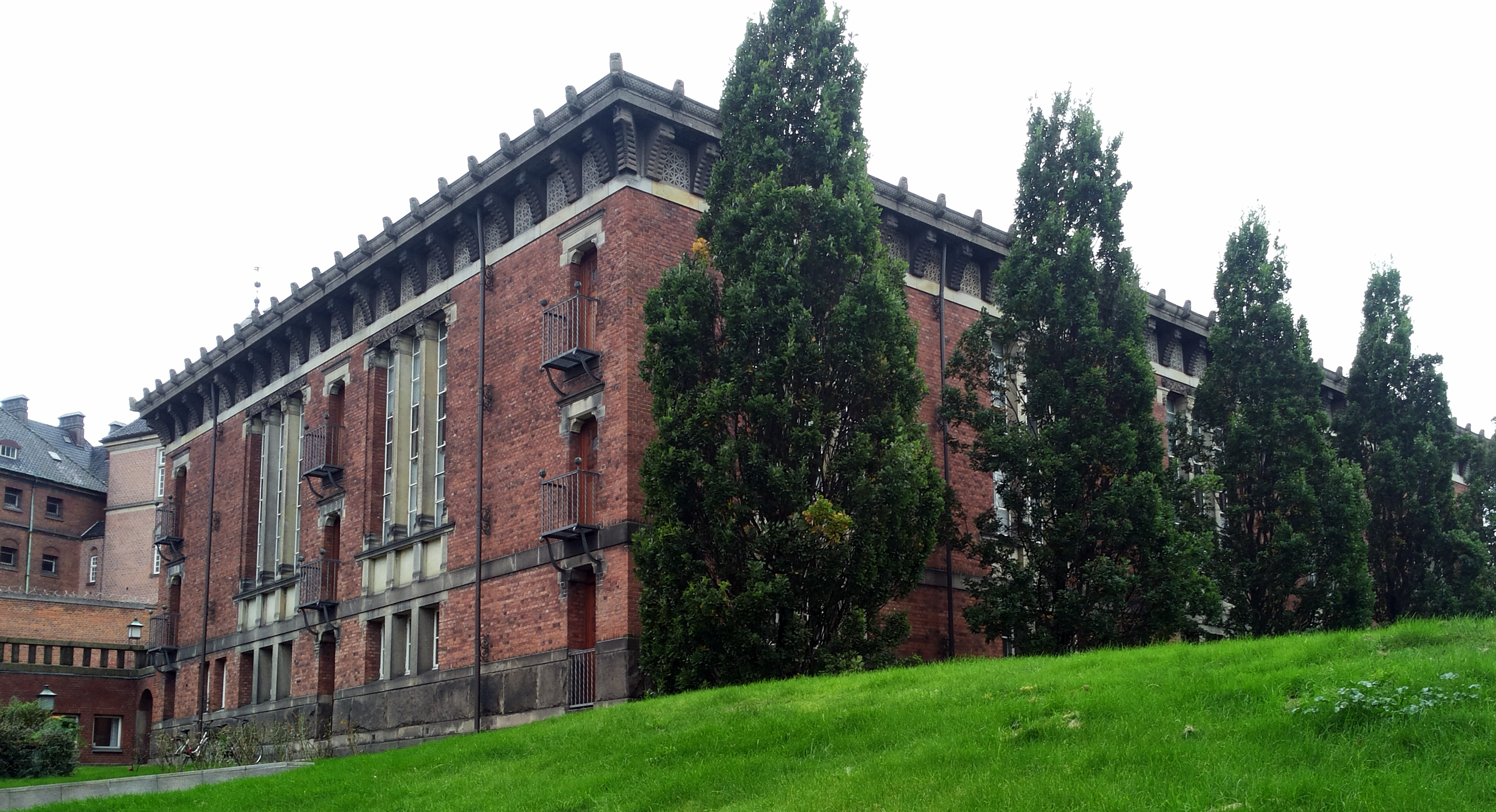

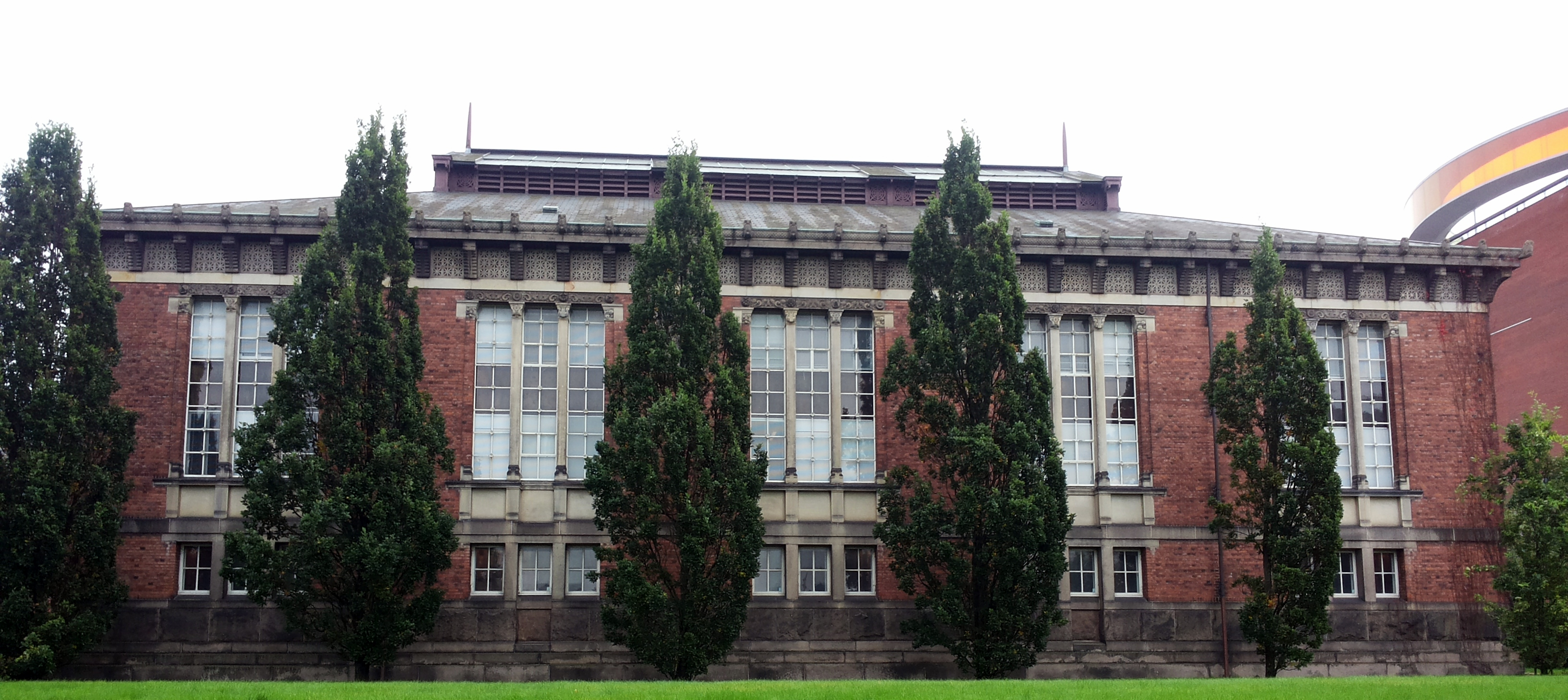

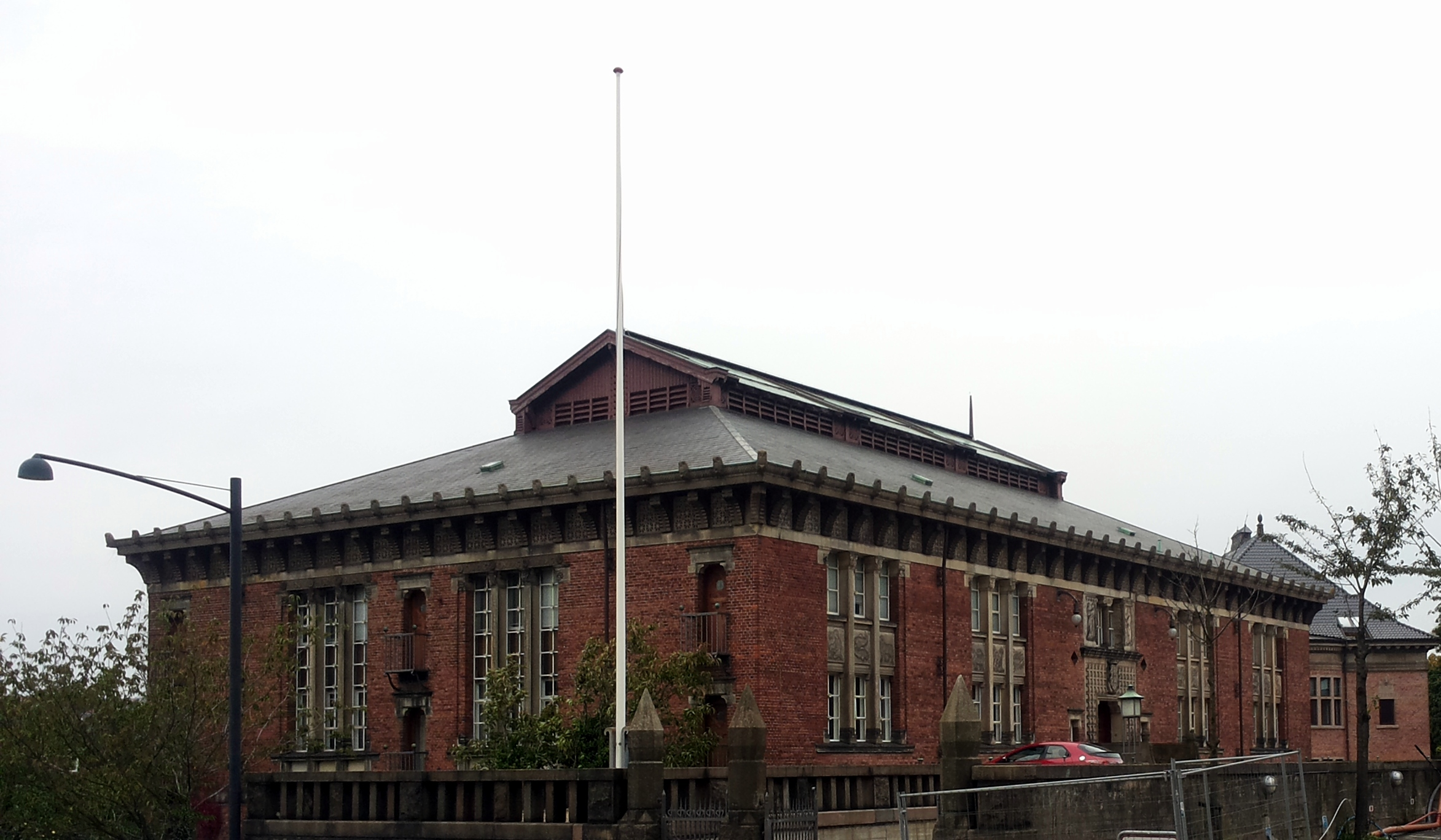

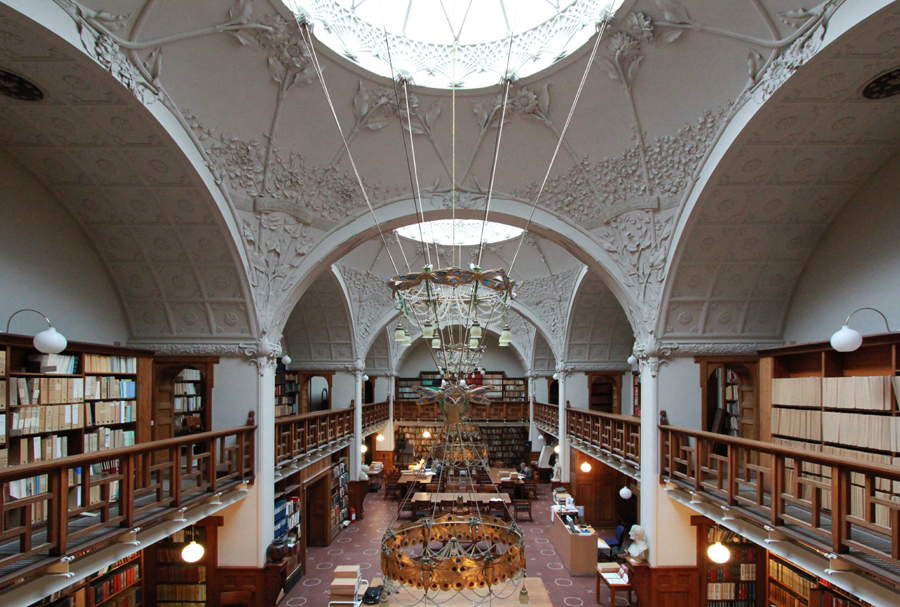
The library

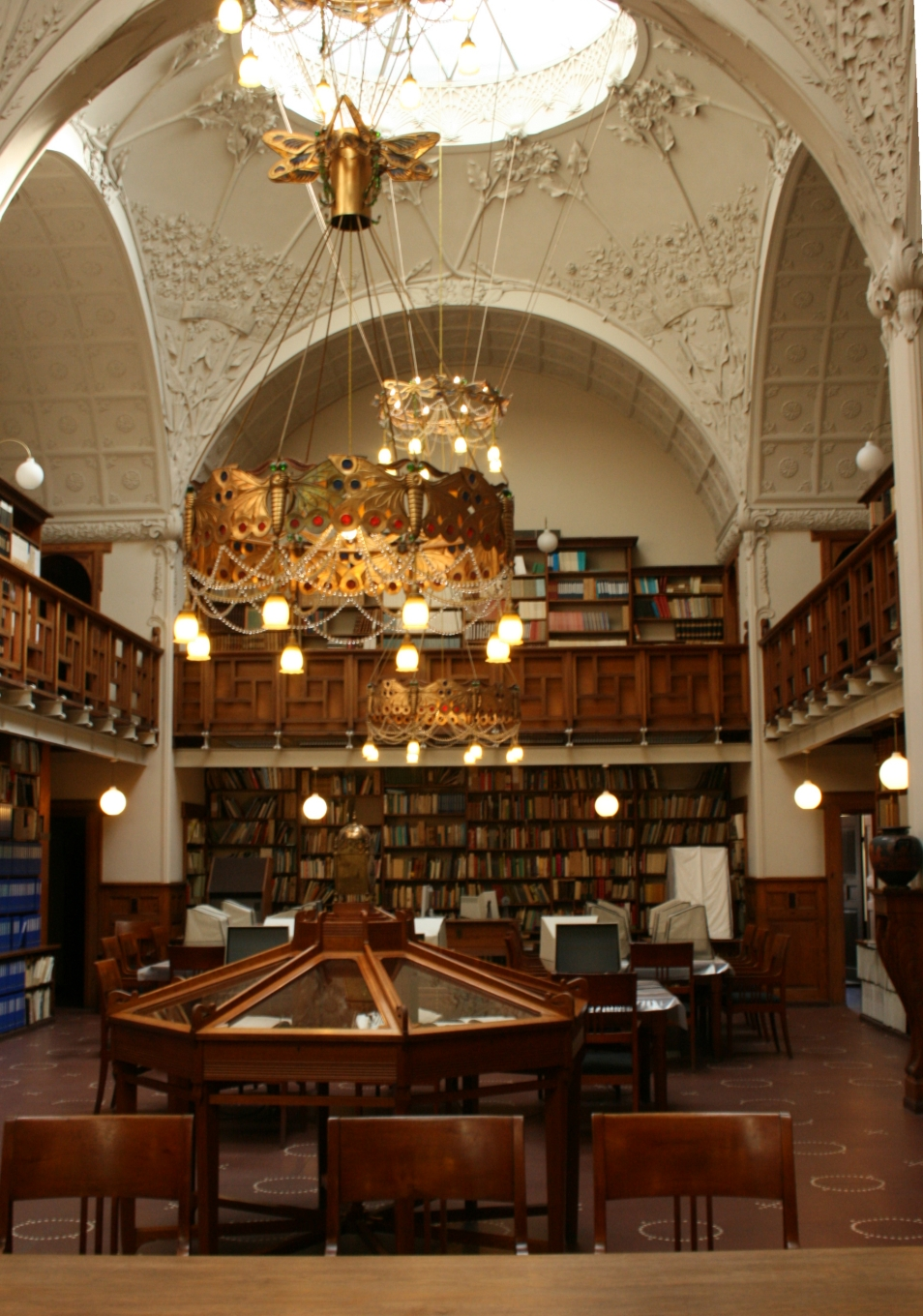
Reading hall
