= State and University Library, Denmark =

National library of Denmark

Coordinates: 56°10′13.1″N 10°11′57.1″E

- Statsbiblioteket
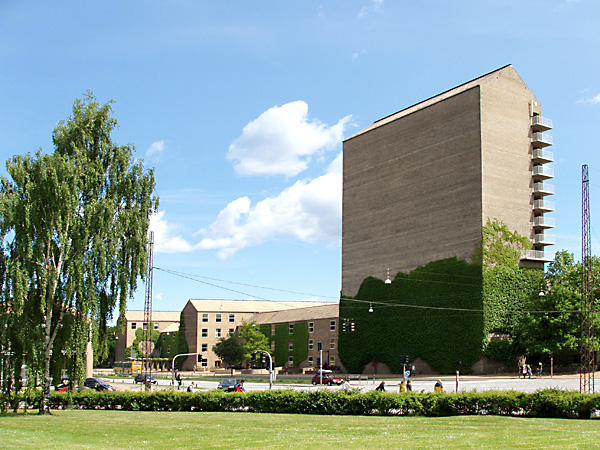
- The State and University Library at the Aarhus University Campus, featuring the landmark high rise of Bogtårnet, the primary book repository.
- Location: Aarhus, Denmark
- Type: National library, university library
- Scope: National Library of Denmark; Aarhus University library
- Established: Legally established 1897; Opened 1902; University Library from 1928

Collection
- Size: 5,528,993 physical units, 6,176,256 electronic titles (as of 2017)
- Legal deposit: Since 1902

Other information
- Website: en.statsbiblioteket.dk

The State and University Library (Danish: Statsbiblioteket) in Aarhus, Denmark, is a national library and the university library of Aarhus University. It is a research library and the central repository for all Danish public libraries holding millions of items both in print and digital formats including sound and music recordings, videos, journals, books, patents, maps, prints and drawings. The library is directly subordinated the Danish Ministry of Culture and is a legal deposit library, receiving copies of all audio, video and newspapers produced in Denmark.

The library is located on the south side of Nordre Ringgade in Midtbyen, Aarhus on the Aarhus University campus. The primary document storage facility is the 14 stories Bogtårnet building.

In 2017, it merged with the Royal Library in Copenhagen to form a combined national library. The combined library organisation (the separate library locations in Copenhagen and Aarhus are maintained) is known as the Royal Danish Library (Danish: Det Kgl. Bibliotek).

== History ==
The state library was established by law in 1897 as one of the first attempts to decentralize the cultural monopoly of Copenhagen. The library opened five years later in 1902 as a Research Library and administrative center for all Danish public libraries. In 1928 Aarhus University was established and the state library became the library for the new university. The responsibilities of the library have been expanded throughout the years and it today functions as a depot and center for loan-cooperation between Danish public libraries and as a center for literature in immigrant languages.

== Collection ==
The collection includes 100,000 books donated by the Danish Royal Library when the state library was first established. The Royal archivist Caspar Frederik Wegener had at the time of his death in 1893 the largest book collection Denmark. The collection was bought by the Danish state in 1897 and it became an important contribution to the new library. The state library also contains the State Newspaper Collection which was established in 1916 and the State Media Collection.

The library's cultural heritage collections are:

- Radio/TV collection: Danish radio and television from the mid-1980s onwards.
- State Newspaper Collection: all the Danish newspapers from the mid-1600s onwards.
- Danish Commercials: Danish cinema adverts from about 1955 to 1995, and all the adverts on TV2 television in the period 1988–2005.
- Music and sound: all Danish music publications and unique sound recordings such as speeches by famous men and women, dialects, and Denmark's oldest sound recordings on wax cylinders.
- Netarchive: the Danish part of the internet from July 2005 onwards.
- Special collections: a range of collections, for instance timetables, funeral sermons, handwriting, old political documents and much more.

In 1999, the collection included 4 million items in print such as books, journals, newspapers, etc. and c. 400,000 sound, radio and television recordings.

== Buildings ==
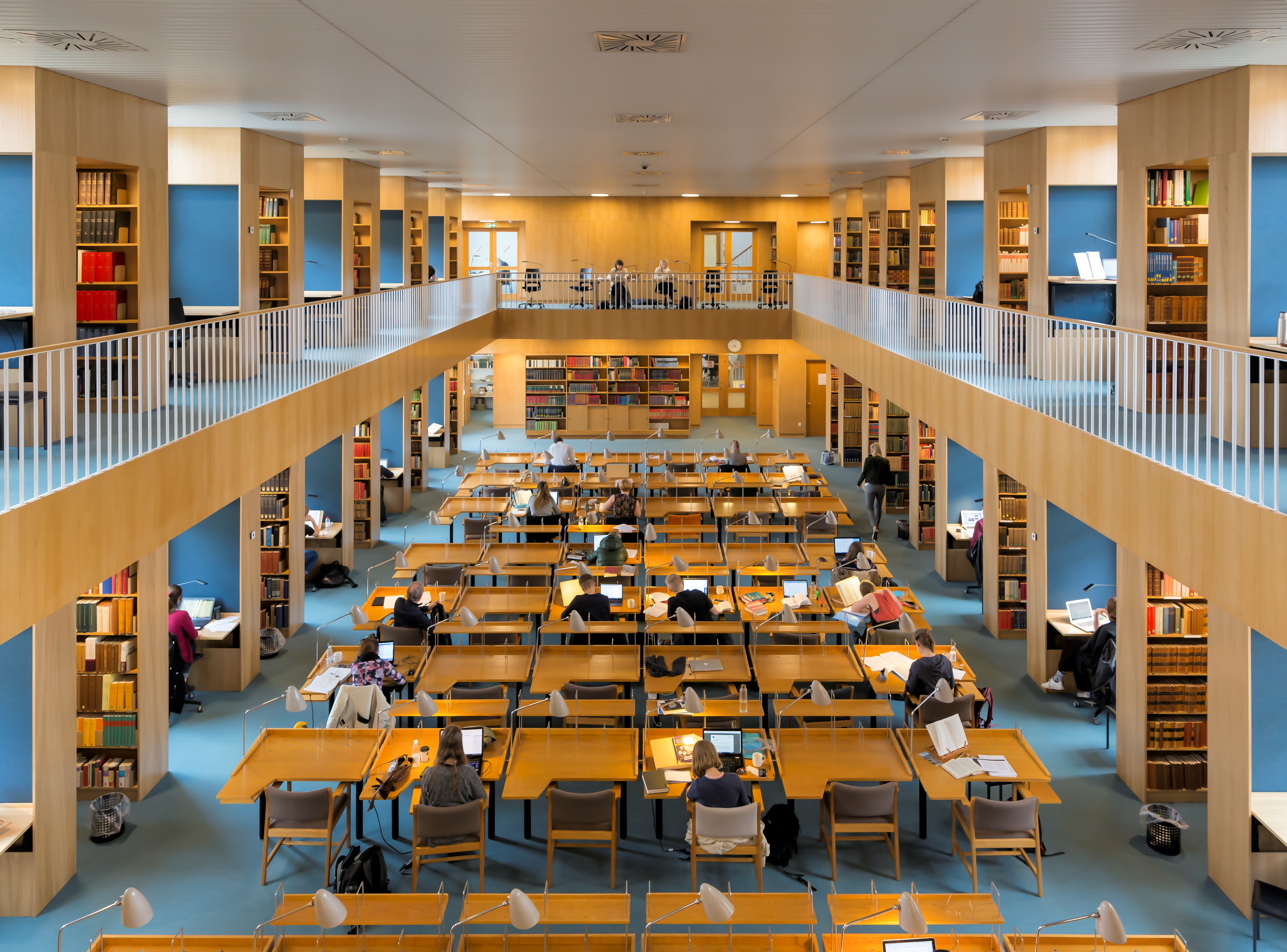
Reading room in the library

The state library started out in a building on Vester Allé 12 designed by Hack Kampmann for the purpose. The building quickly proved too small, especially after the duties of being a university library was added in 1928. In 1963, the library moved to a new building, Bogtårnet (The Book Tower), designed by C.F. Møller on the university campus. In 1995, the architect firm Kjær & Richter renovated the interior.

== Fusion with The Royal Library ==
In September 2016, the Danish Ministry of Culture announced that The State and University Library would merge with the Royal Library in Copenhagen, with effect from 1 January 2017. The new institution is called the Royal Danish Library.

== See also ==
- List of libraries in Denmark
