= Cloud printing =

There are, in essence, three kinds of cloud printing.

- Consumer-based Cloud printing connects mobile devices and PC to Cloud-enabled home printers that people own or have access to.
- Corporate Cloud printing allows employees to print from anywhere to any corporate or home printer and IT can remove all print servers and sometimes even all printer drivers.
- Commercial Cloud print service enables content owners to print their digital publications by leveraging networks of production facilities through cloud computing technology. It allows for the "ad-hoc transformation of digital information into physical forms in 2D or 3D."

== Benefits ==
76% of IT teams have moved, or plan to move, their print workflows to the cloud due to its simplicity. Consumers can print easily to any printer from their PC, tablet or smartphone, while the Cloud print service monitors the supplies level. Many printer vendors such as Lexmark propose an automatic supplies shipment based on the real-time analysis of the printer supplies and user behavior to ensure printing will always be possible.

For IT department, Cloud Printing eliminates the need for print servers and represents the only way to print from Cloud virtual desktops and servers. For consumers, cloud ready printers eliminate the need for PC connections and print drivers, enabling them to print from mobile devices. As for publishers and content owners, cloud printing allows them to "avoid the cost and complexity of buying and managing the underlying hardware, software and processes" required for the production of professional print products.

Leveraging cloud print for print on demand also allows businesses to cut down on the costs associated with mass production. Moreover, cloud printing can be considered more eco-friendly, as it significantly reduces the amount of paper used (13% reduction in print jobs yearly) and lowers carbon emissions from transportation.

As many companies move their IT to the Cloud, some adopting the Windows 365 and Azure Virtual Desktop services from Microsoft, the connection from the Cloud environment to the on-premise printers become an issue as opening ports for incoming print flow traffic is not an option. In 2020, at the exact same time Google discontinued its Google Print offer, Microsoft has announced its Universal Print service offer, aimed at making printing compatible with Cloud Desktop environments, making printing driver-free and simple with no client to install on PC. With Universal Print Microsoft has built a disrupting architecture with a value proposition commodifying printers, removing print servers and drivers, allowing to move printers to VLAN for security purpose and printing from anywhere. Clients are free to use any printer from any model as they all work the same, clients are not tied anymore to any printer brand and that gave a significant boost to the Cloud print market. That Microsoft Universal Print architecture provides APIs to third-party developers who can develop add-ons such as Celiveo 365 to extend Microsoft Cloud Print with added features such as access control on printers and copiers, follow-me pull print, data encryption, advanced usage reporting or charge back.

== Providers of Consumer Cloud Printing Solutions ==
Before 2020 only a handful of providers used to work towards a professional cloud print solution, operating in their own niche or focus on mobile devices. In 2020 Microsoft has boosted that market by announcing its Universal Print Cloud printing service and since then many publishers have started to propose solutions for that growing market. The Covid pandemic also created the need for employees to be able to print at home when using the corporate IT software. Closed VPN often prevent accessing home network printers from corporate laptops and Full Public Cloud solutions are meant to be a solution to that problem.

After the decision by Google to terminate Google Cloud Print service on 31 December 2020, most printer vendors released their own mobile cloud solution to fill the gap, while Hewlett-Packard implemented its own cloud print with their ePrint solution. Those solutions are often proprietary, only working on printers proposed by the vendor. Google has decided to let third-party developers develop Cloud Print solutions and to limit its scope to certifying the best Print Management offers compatible with its Chrome Enterprise Cloud ecosystem.

== Providers of Corporate Cloud Printing solutions ==
While many print solutions claim to be "Cloud Printing", there are actually three categories: full Private Cloud, full Public Cloud, and Hybrid Cloud. Their differences are real and have an impact on the overall TCO as the more software there is on-site, the more hidden cost there are.

- Full Private Cloud is about moving a standard on-premises printing solution to a Cloud hosting and setup a VPN service to establish communication between the corporate LAN and the Cloud service. It is not a SaaS and provides little added value since the whole solution needs to be managed and printers can only be located on the corporate network accessible through the VPN. Furthermore some Cloud providers charge for inbound and/or outbound traffic and print jobs are notoriously heavy in size and/or volume and therefore can have a significant cost. Users who want to recycle existing on-premises licenses can use it to save on the license cost.
- Full Public Cloud is full SaaS, there is no software installed on-premises, just a subscription on a portal. Printers communicate directly to the Cloud servers like what Google Print used to do. This is the cleanest, safest and easiest Cloud solution, but depends on the ability of the printers to either have built-in Cloud print capability or accept third party embedded agents that perform that communication to the Cloud. If implemented correctly, it also provides the highest security as no Man-in-the-Middle attack is possible between the printer and the Cloud.
- Hybrid Cloud solutions use a combination of on-premises software and Cloud services. Some offers are predominantly on-premises with an added module to communicate to the Cloud, some are predominantly Cloud-based with a small module on-premises to link the Cloud with local printers.

In the Full Public Cloud category, independent SaaS vendors like Celiveo, ezeep, Printix, and Y Soft support a wide range of printer brands and models, allowing clients to buy the best printer without being locked on any brand. They are leveraging cloud computing technology to offer cloud-based print infrastructure and cloud-based printing software as a Service (SaaS). These solutions have integrations to cloud enabled printers or provide embedded printer agents. They feature allow users to print to any printer in any network, isolated network or not, even if that printer is otherwise not reachable from the user's computer. This also allows IT departments to move printers to VLAN for maximum security, like what they are doing with IP phones.

Google Chrome Enterprise Cloud ecosystem has its own technical particularities and Google certifies Print Management solutions, ensuring they comply with Google technical requirement, yet letting each solution differentiate from others with specific features or security. Many of solutions for Chrome Enterprise are Hybrid, a few are Full Public Cloud.

Industry experts believe that as these services become more popular, users will no longer consider printers as necessary assets but rather as devices that they can access on demand when the need to generate a printed page presents itself.

== Caveats of Cloud Printing ==
- While these cloud printing options do simplify the printing process, all the print data must travel through the public cloud as it makes its journey from device to printer., the security of the solution and data transport must be carefully checked.
- Print speed may be impacted when Internet is too slow.
- An internet outage will prevent printing unless the solution features High Availability and/or features a PC agent taking over communication to local printers when the Cloud cannot be reached.
- True Public Cloud print solutions do not require any on-premises servers in the company complementing the cloud, whether that is a print server or an application server, or a "gateway" or "Mesh" service. Today, many solution providers just interface an on-premises server with a cloud database and label it a cloud print solution, which it is not.
- Some solutions can only print with instant release, when corporate printing has standardized on card or PIN release of pending print jobs - Some solutions can only address the print capability of printers, not providing PIN or card access control for the copy, scan, fax, email.
- It is best to choose printer-independent Cloud Printing solutions to have the freedom to support any printer brand model with one unique solution

== Security ==
Print jobs flow through Public Internet. It is therefore important to verify no Man-in-the-Middle attack can be performed. The only technical solution is to ensure each printer and PC uses a non-self-generated cryptographic token or certificate allowing TLS mutual authentication and specific data encryption. Self-generated printer certificates are unknown from the Cloud and prevent trusted authentication. Microsoft has implemented its Zero Trust Access security in its Universal Print service, it generates a unique certificate on printers compatible with its service. Other Cloud Printing SaaS providers have followed Microsoft on that High Security path.

Print jobs data stored on the Cloud is sensitive as it contains user information as well as all information appearing on pages. Good practices require such data is encrypted at rest and in motion, using asymmetric PKI keys instead of fixed encryption keys.

Some solutions require to open incoming traffic ports on the firewall to let Cloud services communicate with printers attached behind that firewall (most of the time for IPP/IPPS flows), some other solutions use a pull model where the communication is always initiated by the printer and no firewall port needs to be open. In terms of security the later is to be preferred.
