= Royal Danish Library =

National library organisation of Denmark

- Det Kgl. Bibliotek

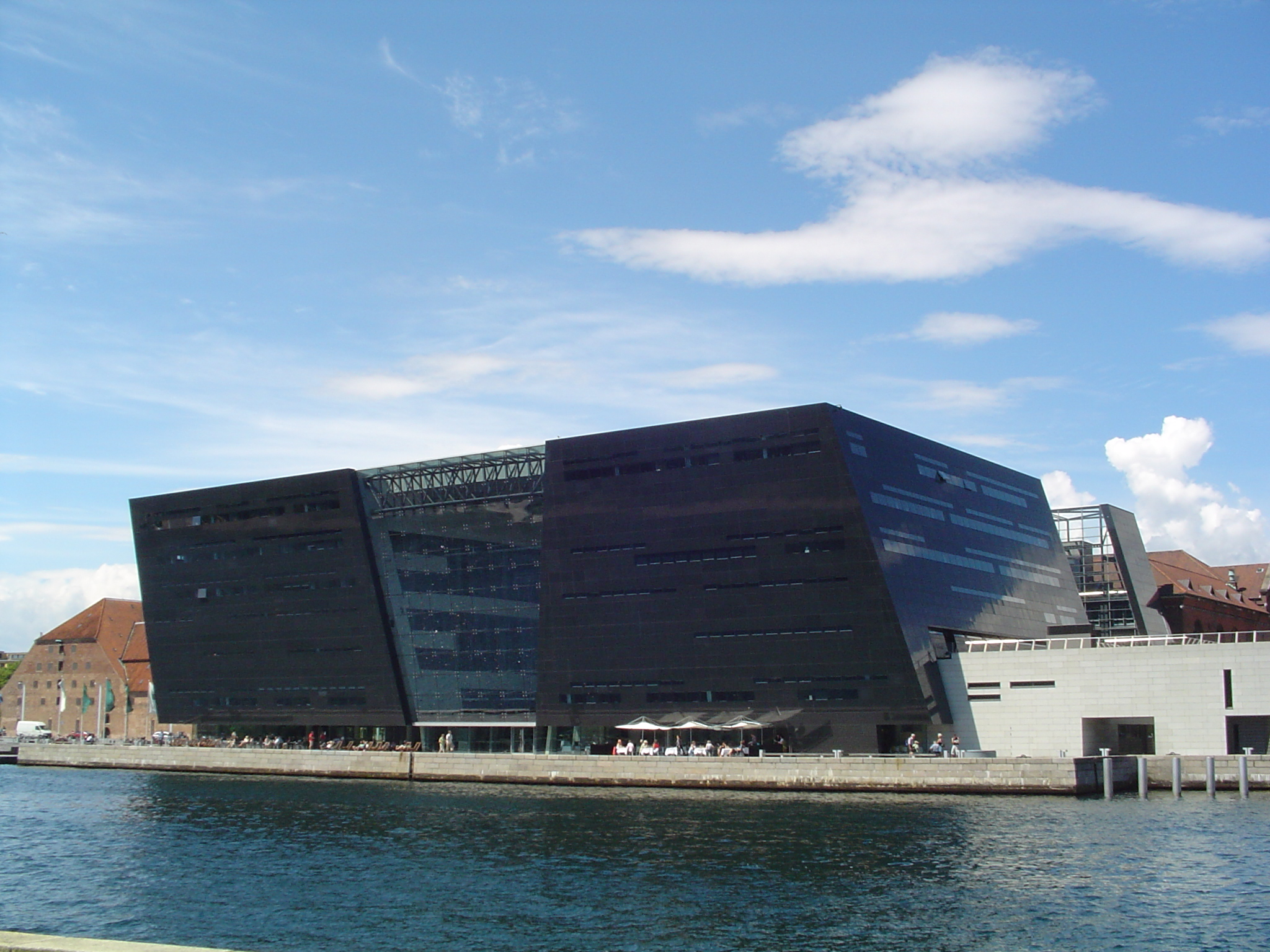
- The Royal Library in Copenhagen
- Location: Aarhus, Denmark, Copenhagen, Denmark, Denmark
- Type: National Library, University Library, National Center for Shared Services for Public Libraries
- Established: 1648

Collection
- Size: 42,504,062 physical units, 8,615,234 electronic titles (as of 2017)
- Legal deposit: Since 1697

Other information
- Director: Svend Larsen
- Employees: 800+
- Website: www.kb.dk/en

Royal Danish Library (Danish: Det Kgl. Bibliotek) is a merger of the two previous national libraries in Denmark: the State and University Library in Aarhus and the Royal Library in Copenhagen. Although now under a single organisation, the separate locations in both cities are maintained.

The merger came into effect on January 1, 2017.

== See also ==
- List of libraries in Denmark
