= Odense University =

University in Odense, Denmark

- Odense Universitet
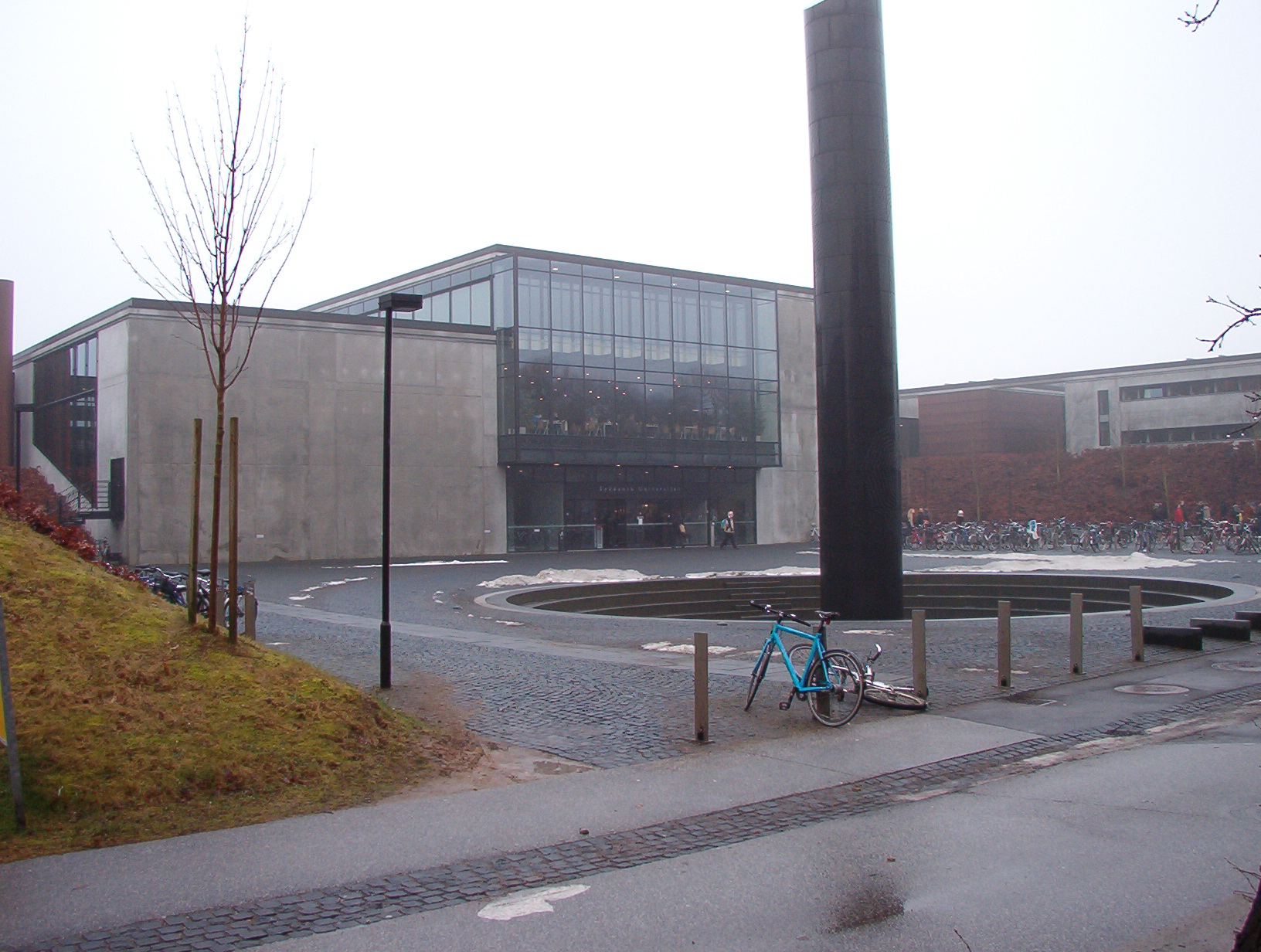
- Latin: Universitas Othiniensis
- Motto: Fructus Increscit Opera Novo In Agro
- Type: Public
- Active: 1966; 60 years ago – 1998; 28 years ago
- Location: Odense, Denmark; 55°22′9.24″N 10°25′43.73″E
- Campus: Urban

Odense University was a university in Odense, Denmark. It was established in 1966. In 1998, the university was merged with two other institutions to form the University of Southern Denmark. Its campus is now known as University of Southern Denmark Odense (Syddansk Universitet Odense, abbr. SDU Odense) and is the university's biggest campus.

== History ==
The university was established in 1966. It had four faculties: Humanities, Social Sciences, Health Science and Natural Sciences.

In 1998, Odense University was merged with the Southern Denmark School of Business and Engineering and the South Jutland University Centre to form the University of Southern Denmark. The campus is now known as SDU Odense, and is considered the main campus of the University of Southern Denmark, both because of its relative size and because the central administration of the university is situated there.

== Campus ==
Being an epitome of Danish functionalist architecture, the campus has been nicknamed Rustenborg (which roughly translates as The Rusty Castle) by students and staff, because it is built from gray concrete slabs clad with weathering steel, in an early architectural use of that material. Its architecture has also given rise to other nicknames and slang expressions among students and staff. For instance, the administrative block goes by the name of Førerbunkeren ("Führerbunker"), referring to the architectural similarities between the university building and a stereotypical military building. The University of Southern Denmark's students' magazine is simply called Rust.

== Motto and logo ==
When abbreviated, the university motto becomes FIONIA, the Latin name for Funen. The motto was created by the university's first rector, Mogens Brøndsted in 1966. Brøndsted also designed the university logo, featuring an apple tree.
