= Open access in Denmark =

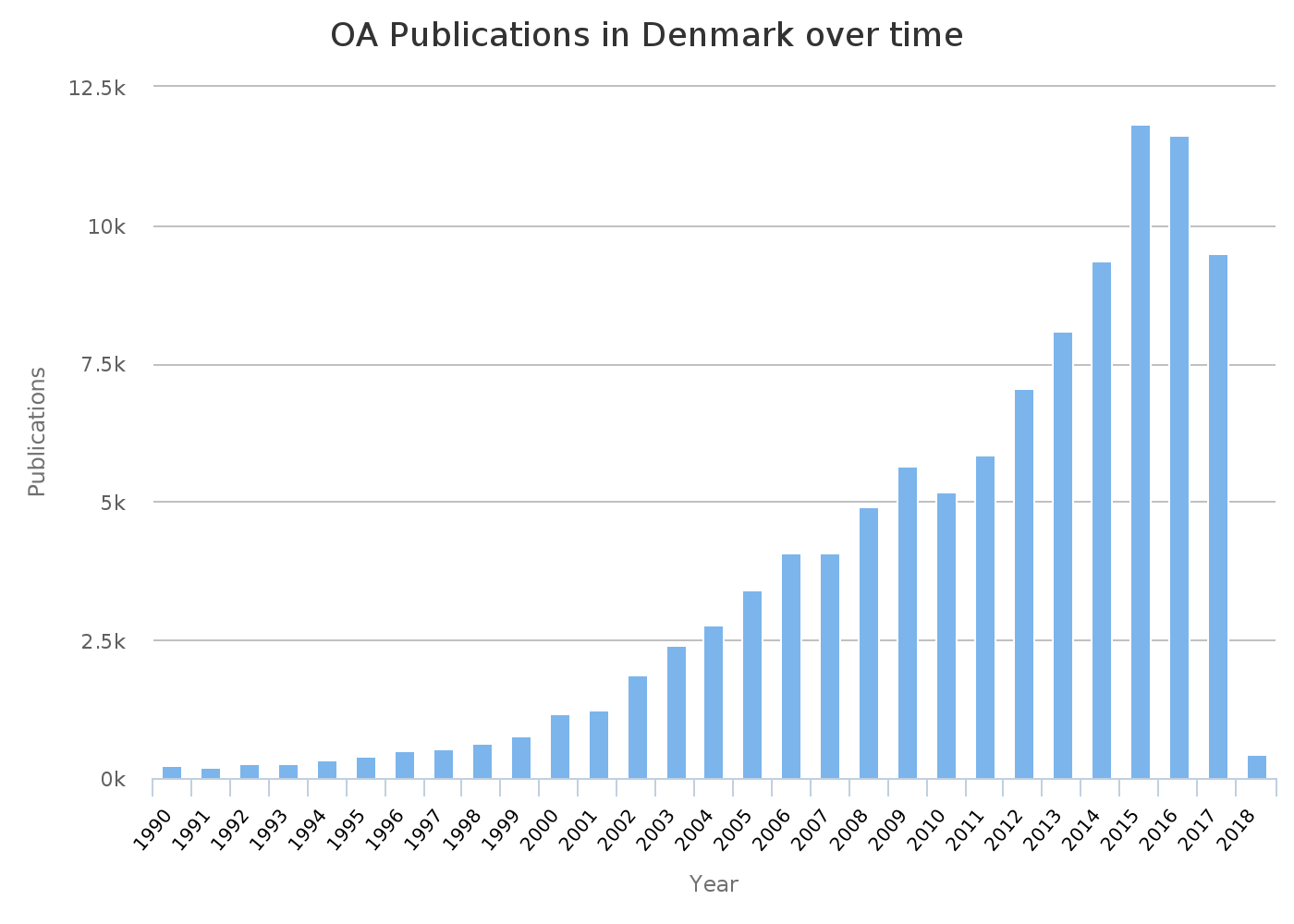
Growth of open access publications in Denmark, 1990–2018

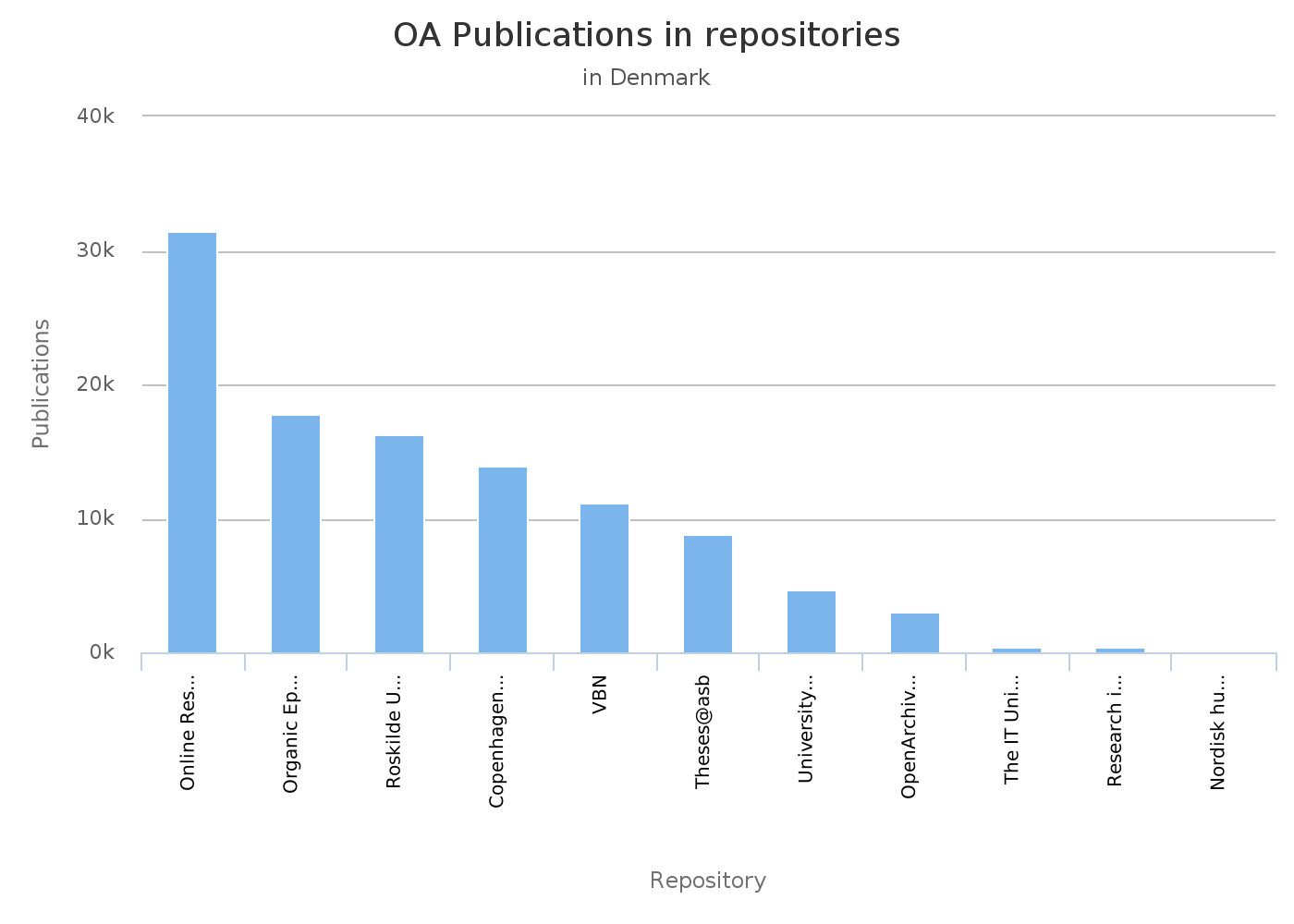
Number of open access publications in various Danish repositories, 2018

Open access to scholarly communication in Denmark has grown rapidly since the 1990s. As in other countries in general, open access publishing is less expensive than traditional, paper-based, pre-Internet publishing.

== Repositories and platforms ==
There are a number of collections of scholarship in Denmark housed in digital open access repositories. They contain journal articles, book chapters, data, and other research outputs that are free to read. The consortial Scandinavian hprints repository began operating in 2008, specializing in arts, humanities, and social sciences content. In 2017, Aarhus University launched an open science platform, SPOMAN.

== Policy ==
Leaders of the Copenhagen Business School voted in June 2009 to adopt an open access mandate, the first of its kind in Denmark.

In 2012 Denmark's main public funders of research began requiring that grantees deposit articles into open access digital repositories. In 2014, the Danish Ministry of Research created a national policy requiring open access for all publicly funded research published after 2020.

== See also ==
- Nordbib, a funding programme to aid and develop open access initiatives within the academic field in the Nordic countries
- Publishing companies of Denmark
- Internet in Denmark
- Education in Denmark
- Media of Denmark
- Copyright law of the European Union
- Open access in other countries
