= Princh =

Danish software company

Princh A/S
- Website type: Private
- Available in: English, French, Spanish, Danish, Swedish, German, Portuguese, Polish, Arabic, Lithuanian and Finnish
- Founded: 2015
- Headquarters: Aarhus, {{{location_country}}}
- Area served: Denmark, Europe
- CEO: Thomas Ommen
- Industry: Software / Technology
- Products: Mobile app (iOS, Android); Desktop app Web app
- Services: Document services and electronic payment
- Employees: 18 (2021)
- Website: https://princh.com/
- Launched: June 2015; 11 years ago
- Current status: Active

Princh is a Danish software company, which is headquartered in Aarhus, Denmark. Founded in 2015, Princh develops cloud printing and electronic payment products. The company is headquartered in the city of Aarhus.

While utilizing a smartphone or web app, users can locate a nearby printer to their current location, get directions to access said printer, and/or authorize a print and pay for the print job in question. The product is available as a native mobile apps for Android and iOS, as well as on web and desktop products for businesses and libraries. The app connects a network of printer owners and users around the world. Princh supports an array of printable files.

== History ==
The company was founded in 2015. The company is currently based in the southern part of Aarhus. The Princh printing service was officially launched on June 23, 2015.

Currently, Princh is available as a service in a multitude of locations such as print shops, libraries, hotels, or universities. Princh is a popular printing and payment product among libraries and can among other places be found in Denmark, Sweden, Norway, Germany, United Kingdom, United States, and Canada.

== How it works ==
With the Princh app, users will be able to locate their nearest printer. Once the user is at the printer, the user chooses the document to be printed out and shares it with the Princh app. The user then selects the desired nearby printer entering the printer ID number or scanning the QR-code located on top of the printer, pays electronically and the print job is processed by the printer.

Printer owners get access to a personal control panel where they can set printing prices and monitor all Princh activity for their business.

== See also ==
- Printer (computing)
- Application software
- Cloud printing
