= Orkney =

Archipelago, county and council area in northern Scotland

- Flag Coat of arms

Location

- Location within Scotland
- Coordinates: 59°00′N 3°00′W; ISO Code: GB-ORK

Name
- Gaelic pronunciation: Arcaibh
- Name meaning: Seal Islands
- Old Norse name: Orkneyjar

Physical geography
- Island group: Northern Isles
- Area: 990 km^{2} (380 sq mi)
- Highest elevation: Ward Hill 481 m (1,578 ft)

Administration
- Council area: Orkney Islands Council
- Country: Scotland
- Sovereign state: United Kingdom

Demographics
- Population: 21,920 (2025)
- Population density: 22/km^{2} (57/sq mi)
- Largest settlement: Kirkwall

Orkney (/ˈɔːrkni/), also known as the Orkney Islands, is an archipelago off the north coast of mainland Scotland. The plural name the Orkneys is also sometimes used. Part of the Northern Isles along with Shetland, Orkney is 10 miles (16 km) north of Caithness and has about 70 islands, of which 20 are inhabited. The largest island, the Mainland, has an area of 523 square kilometres (202 sq mi), making it the sixth-largest Scottish island and the tenth-largest island in the British Isles. Orkney's largest settlement, and also its administrative centre, is Kirkwall.

Orkney is one of the 32 council areas of Scotland, as well as a constituency of the Scottish Parliament, a lieutenancy area, and an historic county. The local council is Orkney Islands Council.

The islands have been inhabited likely for at least 10,000 years, occupied by terminal Upper Palaeolithic and Mesolithic hunter-gatherers, and subsequently by Neolithic and Bronze Age farmers and later by Picts during the Iron Age. Orkney was colonised and later annexed by the Kingdom of Norway in 875 and settled by the Norsemen. In 1472, the Parliament of Scotland absorbed the Earldom of Orkney into the Kingdom of Scotland, following failure to pay a dowry promised to James III of Scotland by the family of his bride, Margaret of Denmark.

In addition to the Mainland, most of the remaining islands are divided into two groups: the North Isles and the South Isles. The local climate is relatively mild and the soils are extremely fertile; most of the land is farmed, and agriculture is the most important sector of the economy. The significant wind and marine energy resources are of growing importance; the amount of electricity that Orkney generates annually from renewable energy sources exceeds its demand. Temperatures average 4 °C (39 °F) in winter and 12 °C (54 °F) in summer.

The local people are known as Orcadians; they speak a distinctive dialect of the Scots language and have a rich body of folklore. Orkney contains some of the oldest and best-preserved Neolithic sites in Europe; the "Heart of Neolithic Orkney" is a designated UNESCO World Heritage Site. Orkney also has an abundance of marine and avian wildlife.

== Etymology ==
Pytheas of Massalia visited Britain – probably sometime between 322 and 285 BC – and described it as triangular in shape, with a northern tip called Orcas. This may have referred to Dunnet Head, from which Orkney is visible. Writing in the 1st century AD, the Roman geographers Ptolemy and Pomponius Mela called the islands Orcades (Ancient Greek: Όρκάδες), as did Tacitus in AD 98, claiming that his father-in-law Agricola had "discovered and subjugated the Orcades hitherto unknown" (although both Mela and Pliny had previously referred to the islands). The Byzantine John Tzetzes in his work Chiliades called the islands Orcades.

Etymologists usually interpret the element orc- as a Pictish tribal name meaning "young pig" or "young boar". (Note: The proto-Celtic root *φorko-, can mean either pig or salmon, thus giving an alternative of "island(s) of (the) salmon".) Speakers of Old Irish referred to the islands as Insi Orc "islands of the young pigs". The archipelago is known as Ynysoedd Erch in modern Welsh and Arcaibh in modern Scottish Gaelic, the -aibh representing a fossilized prepositional case ending. Some earlier sources alternatively hypothesise that Orkney comes from the Latin orca, whale. The Anglo-Saxon monk Bede refers to the islands as Orcades insulae in Ecclesiastical History of the English People.

Norwegian settlers arriving from the late ninth century reinterpreted orc as the Old Norse orkn "seal" and added eyjar "islands" to the end, so the name became Orkneyjar "Seal Islands". The plural suffix -jar was later removed in English leaving the modern name Orkney. According to the Historia Norwegiæ, Orkney was named after an earl called Orkan.

The Norse knew Mainland, Orkney as Megenland "Mainland" or as Hrossey "Horse Island". The island is sometimes referred to as Pomona (or Pomonia), a name that stems from a 16th-century mistranslation by George Buchanan, which has rarely been used locally.

Usage of the plural "Orkneys" dates from the 18th century or earlier and was used by for example Sir Walter Scott. From the mid-19th century onwards this plural form has fallen out of use in the local area although it is still often used, particularly by publications based outside Scotland. (Note: Anderson notes "'The Orkneys' is now, perhaps thankfully, out of fashion, but the fact is that it was once in fashion." Many media organisations, including the BBC and The Guardian, advise against using "the Orkneys" in their style guides, although both continue to use the term occasionally.)

== History ==
=== Prehistory ===
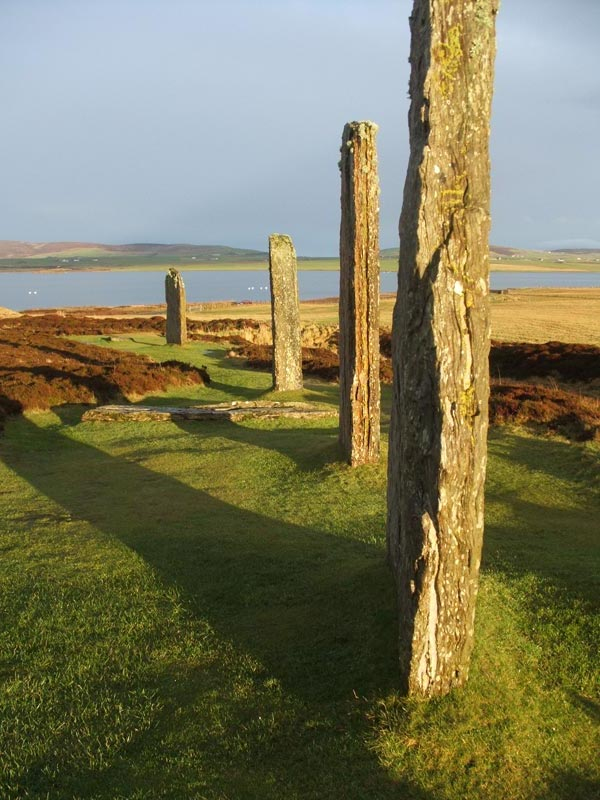
Ring of Brodgar, on the island of Mainland, Orkney

Late Upper Palaeolithic stone tools of the Ahrensburgian culture have been found in Stronsay and Brodgar on mainland Orkney, suggesting the islands have been inhabited around or prior to 8000 BC.

A charred hazelnut shell, recovered in 2007 during excavations in Tankerness on the Mainland, has been dated to 6820–6660 BC, indicating the presence of Mesolithic nomadic tribes. The earliest known permanent settlement is at Knap of Howar, a Neolithic farmstead on the island of Papa Westray, which dates from 3500 BC. The village of Skara Brae, Europe's best-preserved Neolithic settlement, is believed to have been inhabited from around 3100 BC. Other remains from that era include the Standing Stones of Stenness, the Maeshowe passage grave, the Ring of Brodgar and other standing stones. Many of the Neolithic settlements were abandoned around 2500 BC, possibly due to changes in the climate.

In September 2021, archaeologists announced the discovery of two polished stone balls in a 5500-year-old Neolithic burial tomb in Sanday. According to Dr Hugo Anderson, the second object was as the "size of a cricket ball, perfectly spherical and beautifully finished".

During the Bronze Age, fewer large stone structures were built (although the great ceremonial circles continued in use) as metalworking was slowly introduced to Britain from Europe over a lengthy period. There are relatively few Orcadian sites dating from this era although there is the impressive Plumcake Mound near the Ring of Brodgar, and various island sites such as Tofts Ness on Sanday and the remains of two houses on Holm of Faray. Ancient DNA evidence indicates that the Bronze Age was accompanied by large-scale immigration of Bell Beaker-related populations, resulting in a major replacement of the Neolithic Orcadian gene pool, although some indigenous Neolithic male lineages persisted for at least another millennium.

=== Iron Age ===
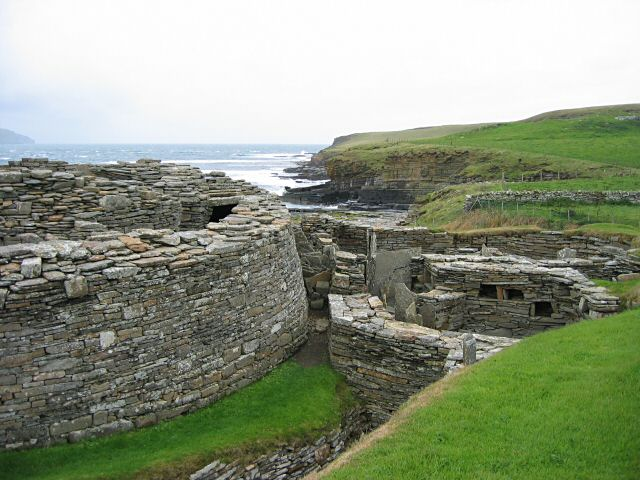
Midhowe Broch on the west coast of Rousay

Excavations at Quanterness on the Mainland have revealed an Atlantic roundhouse built about 700 BC and similar finds have been made at Bu on the Mainland and Pierowall Quarry on Westray. The most impressive Iron Age structures of Orkney are the ruins of later round towers called "brochs" and their associated settlements such as the Broch of Burroughston and Broch of Gurness. The nature and origin of these buildings is a subject of debate. Other structures from this period include underground storehouses and aisled roundhouses, the latter usually in association with earlier broch sites.

During the Roman invasion of Britain the "King of Orkney" was one of 11 British leaders who is said to have submitted to the Emperor Claudius in AD 43 at Camulodunum (modern Colchester). (Note: Thompson (2008) suggests that there was an element of Roman "boasting" involved, given that it was known to them that the Orcades lay at the northern extremity of the British Isles. Similarly, Ritchie describes Tacitus' claims that Rome "conquered" Orkney as "a political puff, for there is no evidence of Roman military presence".) After the Agricolan fleet had come and gone, possibly anchoring at Shapinsay, direct Roman influence seems to have been limited to trade rather than conquest. Polemius Silvius wrote a list of Late Roman provinces, which Seeck appended to his edition of the Notitia Dignitatum. The list names six provinces in Roman Britannia: the sixth is the dubious "Orcades provincia", the possible existence of which recent researches re-evaluate.

By the late Iron Age, Orkney was part of the Pictish kingdom, and although the archaeological remains from this period are less impressive, the fertile soils and rich seas of Orkney probably provided the Picts with a comfortable living. (Note: They were certainly politically organised. Ritchie notes the presence of an Orcadian ruler at the court of a Pictish high king at Inverness in 565 AD.) The Dalriadic Gaels began to influence the islands towards the close of the Pictish era, perhaps principally through the role of Celtic missionaries, as evidenced by several islands bearing the epithet "Papa" in commemoration of these monks and preachers. The Papar brought with them improved manuring practices that enriched and deepened local soils to support the cultivation of barley and oats. The Picts were gradually dispossessed by the North Germanic peoples from the late 8th century onwards. The nature of this transition is controversial, and theories range from peaceful integration to enslavement and genocide. It has been suggested that an assault by forces from Fortriu in 681 in which Orkney was "annihilated" may have led to a weakening of the local power base and helped the Norse come to prominence.

=== Norwegian rule ===
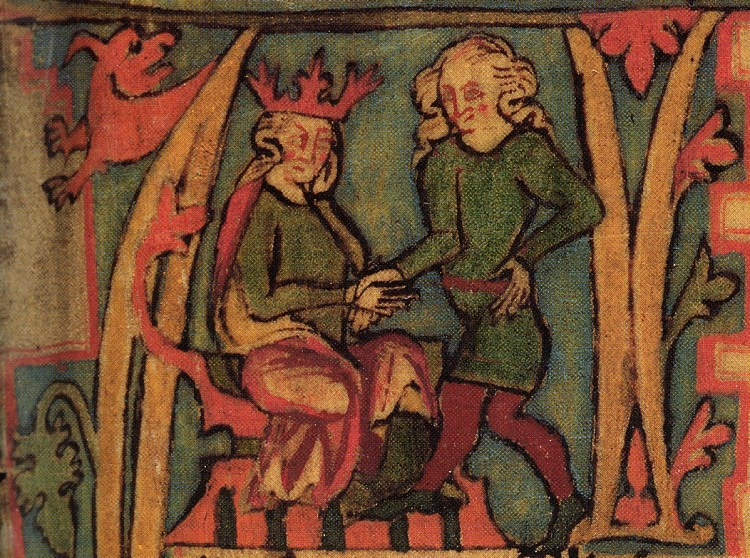
According to the Orkneyinga Saga, Harald Fairhair (on the right, with fair hair) took control of Orkney in 875. He is shown here inheriting his kingdom from his father Halfdan the Black, in an illustration from the Flateyjarbók.

Both Orkney and Shetland saw a significant influx of Norwegian settlers during the late 8th and early 9th centuries. Vikings made the islands the headquarters of their pirate expeditions carried out against Norway and the coasts of mainland Scotland. In response, Norwegian king Harald Fairhair (Harald Hårfagre) annexed the Northern Isles, comprising Orkney and Shetland, in 875 (it is clear that this story, which appears in the Orkneyinga Saga, is based on the later voyages of Magnus Barelegs and some scholars believe it to be apocryphal). Rognvald Eysteinsson received Orkney and Shetland from Harald as an earldom as reparation for the death of his son in battle in Scotland, and then passed the earldom on to his brother Sigurd the Mighty. Sigurd went on to conquer northern parts of mainland Britain in the late 9th century, including Caithness and Sutherland.

However, Sigurd's line barely survived him and it was Torf-Einarr, Rognvald's son by a slave, who founded a dynasty that controlled the islands for centuries after his death. (Note: Sigurd The Mighty's son Gurthorm ruled for a single winter after Sigurd's death and died childless. Rognvald's son Hallad inherited the title but, unable to constrain Danish raids in Orkney, he gave up the earldom and returned to Norway, which according to the Orkneyinga Saga "everyone thought was a huge joke.") He was succeeded by his son Thorfinn Skull-splitter and during this time the deposed Norwegian King Eric Bloodaxe often used Orkney as a raiding base before being killed in 954. Thorfinn's death and presumed burial at the broch of Hoxa, on South Ronaldsay, led to a long period of dynastic strife.

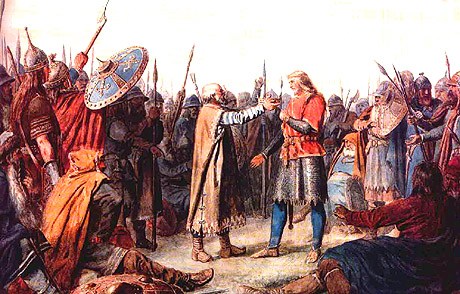
Artist's conception of King Olaf Tryggvason of Norway, who forcibly Christianised Orkney. Painting by Peter Nicolai Arbo.

Initially a pagan culture, detailed information about the turn to the Christian religion in the islands of Scotland during the Norse era is elusive. The Orkneyinga Saga suggests the islands were Christianised by Olaf Tryggvasson in 995 when he stopped at South Walls on his way from Ireland to Norway. The King summoned the jarl Sigurd the Stout (Note: Sigurd the Stout was Thorfinn Skull-splitter's grandson.) and said, "I order you and all your subjects to be baptised. If you refuse, I'll have you killed on the spot and I swear I will ravage every island with fire and steel." Unsurprisingly, Sigurd agreed and the islands became Christian at a stroke, receiving their own bishop in the early 11th century. (Note: The first recorded bishop was Henry of Lund (also known as "the Fat") who was appointed sometime prior to 1035. The bishopric appears to have been under the authority of the Archbishops of York and of Hamburg-Bremen at different times during the early period and from the mid-twelfth century to 1472 was subordinate to the Archbishop of Nidaros (today's Trondheim).) (Note: When the sagas were written down Orkney had been Christian for 200 years or more and this conversion tale has been described as "blatantly unhistorical".)

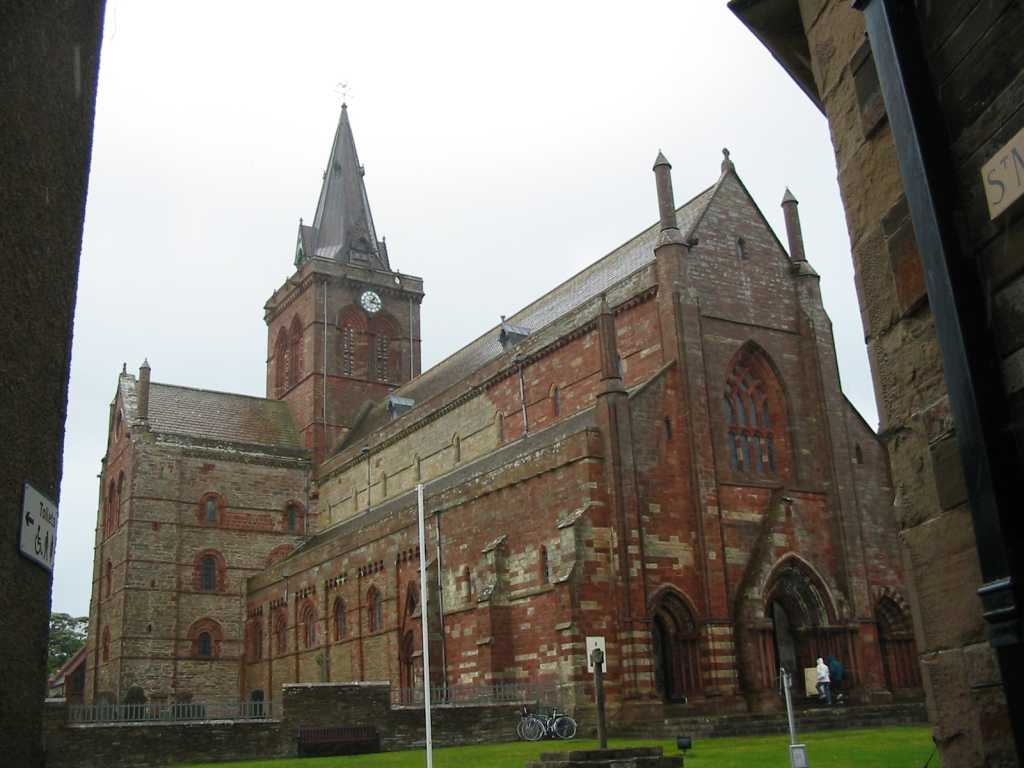
St Magnus Cathedral in Kirkwall

Thorfinn the Mighty was a son of Sigurd and a grandson of King Malcolm II of Scotland (Máel Coluim mac Cináeda). Along with Sigurd's other sons he ruled Orkney during the first half of the 11th century and extended his authority over a small maritime empire stretching from Dublin to Shetland. Thorfinn died around 1065 and his sons Paul and Erlend succeeded him, fighting at the Battle of Stamford Bridge in 1066. Paul and Erlend quarrelled as adults and this dispute carried on to the next generation. The martyrdom of Magnus Erlendsson, who was killed in April 1116 by his cousin Haakon Paulsson, resulted in the building of St Magnus Cathedral, still today a dominating feature of Kirkwall. (Note: The Scandinavian peoples, relatively recent converts to Christianity, tended to confer martyrdom and sainthood on leading figures of the day who met violent deaths. Magnus and Haakon Paulsson had been co-rulers of Orkney, and although he had a reputation for piety, there is no suggestion that Magnus died for his Christian faith.) (Note: "St Magnus Cathedral still dominates the Kirkwall skyline – a familiar, and comforting sight, to Kirkwallians around the world.")

The Scottish crown claimed the overlordship of the Caithness and Sutherland area from Norway in 1098. The jarls thereafter owed allegiance to the Scottish crown for their territory on mainland Britain, which they held as the Mormaer of Caithness, but owed allegiance to the Norwegian crown for Orkney and Shetland. In 1195, the jarls lost control of Shetland when it became a separate lordship.

In 1231 the line of Norse earls, unbroken since Rognvald, ended with Jon Haraldsson's murder in Thurso. The Earldom of Caithness was granted to Magnus, second son of the Earl of Angus, whom Haakon IV of Norway confirmed as Earl of Orkney in 1236. Around the same time, the earldom lost the southern part of its territory on mainland Britain when it was made the separate earldom of Sutherland.

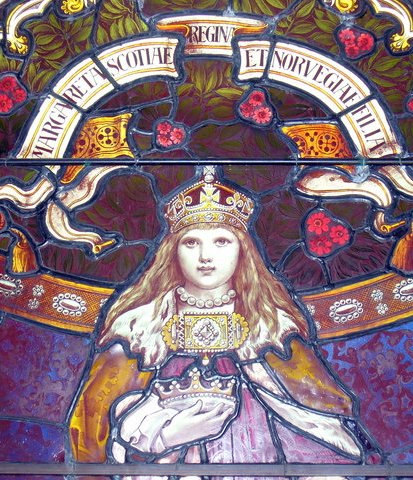
Lerwick Town Hall stained glass window depicting "Margaret, queen of Scotland and daughter of Norway"

In 1290, the death of the child princess Margaret, Maid of Norway in Orkney, en route to mainland Scotland, created a disputed succession that led to the Wars of Scottish Independence. (Note: It is often believed that the princess's death is associated with the village of St Margaret's Hope on South Ronaldsay but there is no evidence for this other than the coincidence of the name.) In the 14th century the earls of Orkney also lost Caithness, after which the earldom just covered the islands of Orkney itself. In 1379 the earldom passed to the Sinclair family, who were also barons of Roslin near Edinburgh. (Note: The notion that Henry the first Sinclair Earl, voyaged to North America many years before Christopher Columbus has gained some currency of late. The idea is however dismissed out of hand by many scholars. For example, Thompson (2008) states "Henry's fictitious trip to America continues to receive a good deal of unfortunate publicity, but it belongs to fantasy rather than real history".)

Evidence of the Viking presence is widespread and includes the settlement at the Brough of Birsay, the vast majority of place names, and the runic inscriptions at Maeshowe. (Note: The Maeshowe inscriptions date from the 12th century.)

=== Absorption by Scotland, and later Great Britain and the United Kingdom ===
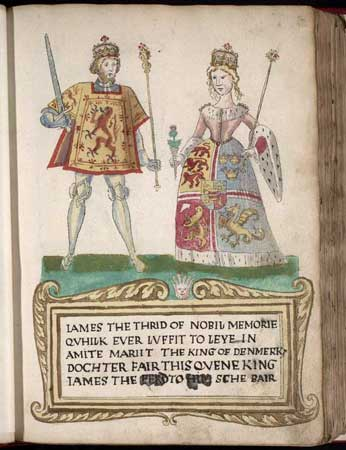
James III and Margaret, whose betrothal led to Orkney passing from Norway to Scotland.

In 1468 Orkney and Shetland was pledged by Christian I, in his capacity as King of Norway, as security against the payment of the dowry of his daughter Margaret, betrothed to James III of Scotland. However, the money was never paid, and Orkney was absorbed by the Kingdom of Scotland in 1472. (Note: Margaret's dowry totalled 60,000 Rhenish florins. Norwegian kings gave an undertaking not to divest their fiefs, yet Christian pawned Orkney for 50,000 florins surely knowing how hard it would be to redeem the islands. Shortly before the marriage the following year he also pawned Shetland for 8,000 florins. The balance of 2,000 florins may have been paid in cash. The contract with Scotland did not stipulate the currency, place or time by which future kings of Norway might exercise a right to reclaim the islands for these fixed sums. Several attempts were made during the subsequent 200 years to redeem them, without success.)

The history of Orkney prior to this time is largely the history of the ruling aristocracy. From then on ordinary people emerge with greater clarity. An influx of Scottish entrepreneurs helped to create a diverse and independent community that included farmers, fishermen and merchants that called themselves comunitas Orcadie and who proved themselves increasingly able to defend their rights against their feudal overlords.

From at least the 16th century boats from mainland Scotland and the Netherlands dominated the local herring fishery. There is little evidence of an Orcadian fleet until the 19th century, but it grew rapidly, and 700 boats were involved by the 1840s, with Stronsay and later Stromness becoming leading centres of development. White fish never became as dominant as in other Scottish ports.

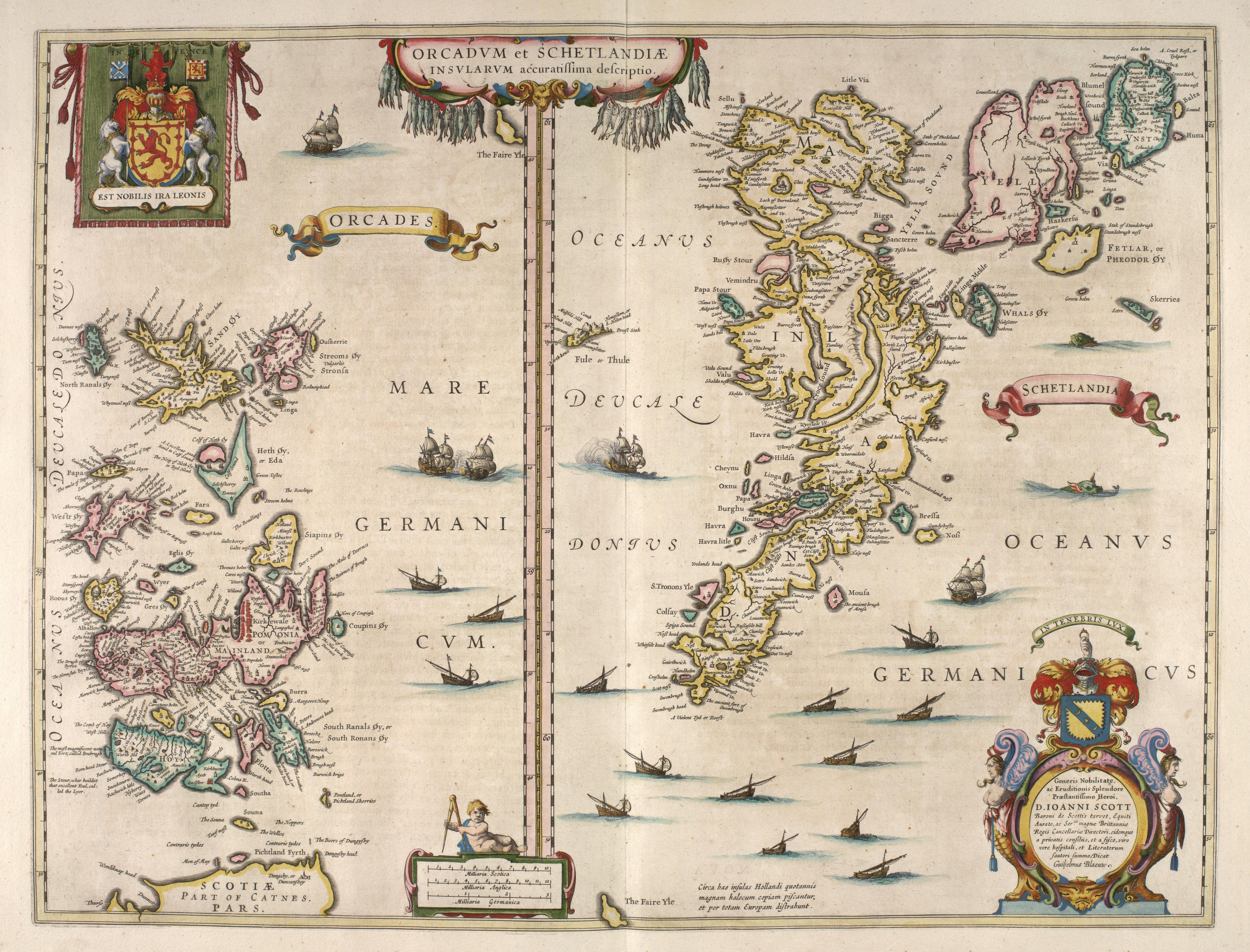
Blaeu's 1654 map of Orkney and Shetland. Mapmakers at this time continued to use the original Latin name Orcades.

Agricultural improvements beginning in the 17th century resulted in the enclosure of the commons and ultimately in the Victorian era the emergence of large and well-managed farms using a five-shift rotation system and producing high-quality beef cattle.

In the 17th century Orcadians formed the overwhelming majority of employees of the Hudson's Bay Company in Canada. The harsh winter weather of Orkney and the Orcadian reputation for sobriety and their boat-handling skills made them ideal candidates for the rigours of the Canadian north. During this period, burning kelp briefly became a mainstay of the islands' economy. For example, on Shapinsay over 3,000 long tons (3,048 t) of burned seaweed were produced per annum to make soda ash, bringing in £20,000 to the local economy. The industry collapsed suddenly in 1830 after the removal of tariffs on imported alkali.

In 1707, as with the rest of Scotland, they became part of the Kingdom of Great Britain.

During the 18th century Jacobite risings Orkney was largely Jacobite in its sympathies. At the end of the 1715 rebellion, a large number of Jacobites who had fled north from mainland Scotland sought refuge in Orkney and were helped on to safety in Sweden. In 1745, the Jacobite lairds on the islands ensured that Orkney remained pro-Jacobite in outlook and was a safe place to land supplies from Spain to aid their cause. Orkney was the last place in the British Isles that held out for the Jacobites and was not retaken by the British Government until 24 May 1746, over a month after the defeat of the main Jacobite army at Culloden.

In 1800, as with the rest of Scotland, the island became part of the United Kingdom of Great Britain and Ireland.

=== 20th century ===
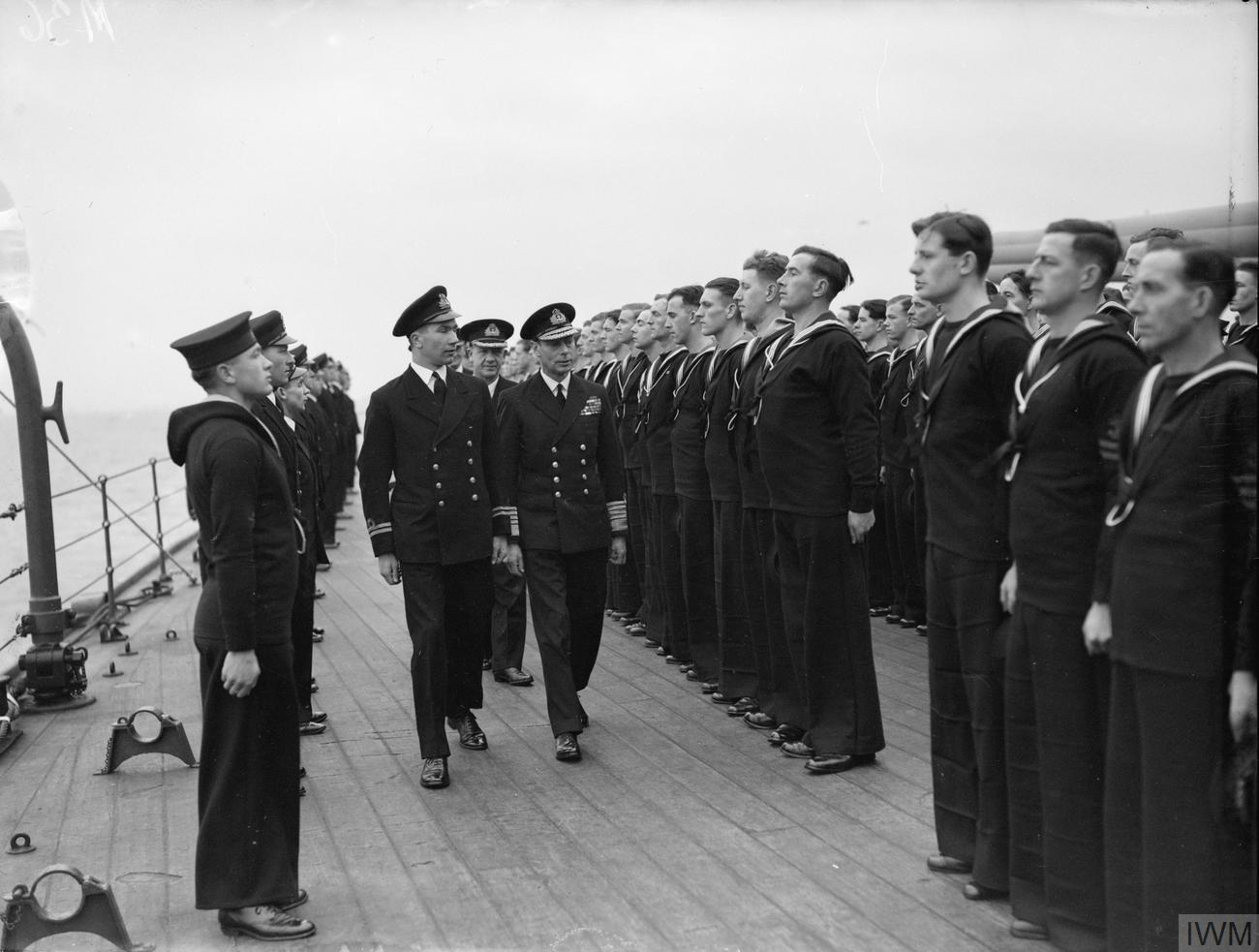
King George VI visiting the Home Fleet based at Scapa Flow, March 1943

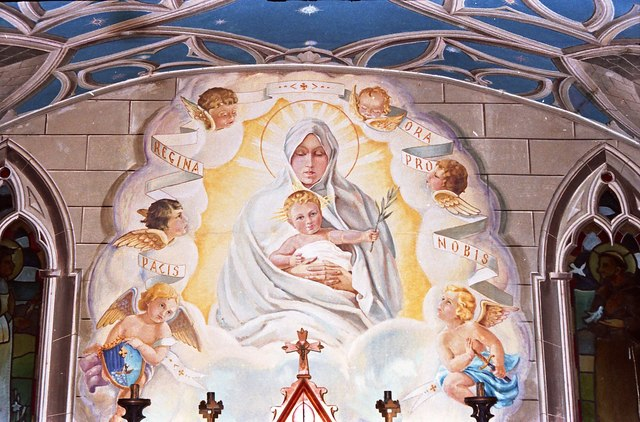
The Italian Chapel on Lamb Holm was built and decorated by Italian prisoners of war working on the Churchill Barriers.

Orkney was the site of a Royal Navy base at Scapa Flow, which played a major role in World War I and World War II. After the Armistice in 1918, the German High Seas Fleet was transferred in its entirety to Scapa Flow to await a decision on its future. The German sailors opened the seacocks and scuttled all the ships. Most ships were salvaged, but the remaining wrecks are now a favoured haunt of recreational divers. One month into World War II, a German U-boat sank the Royal Navy battleship HMS Royal Oak in Scapa Flow. As a result, barriers were built to close most of the access channels; these had the additional advantage of creating causeways enabling travellers to go from island to island by road instead of being obliged to rely on ferries. The causeways were constructed by Italian prisoners of war, who also constructed the ornate Italian Chapel.

The navy base became run down after the war, eventually closing in 1957. The problem of a declining population was significant in the post-war years, though in the last decades of the 20th century, there was a recovery and life in Orkney focused on growing prosperity and the emergence of a relatively classless society. Orkney was rated as the best place to live in Scotland in both 2013 and 2014, and in 2019 the best place to live in the UK, according to the Halifax Quality of Life survey.

=== Overview of population trends ===
Historical population
Year	Pop.	±% p.a.
1801	24,445	—
1811	23,238	−0.51%
1821	26,979	+1.50%
1831	28,847	+0.67%
1841	30,507	+0.56%
1851	31,455	+0.31%
1861	32,395	+0.29%
1881	32,044	−0.05%
1911	25,897	−0.71%
1921	24,111	−0.71%
1931	22,077	−0.88%
1951	21,255	−0.19%
1961	18,747	−1.25%
1971	17,070	−0.93%
1981	18,194	+0.64%
1991	19,644	+0.77%
2001	19,245	−0.20%
2011	21,349	+1.04%
2022	21,958	+0.26%

In the modern era, the population peaked in the mid-19th century at just over 32,000 and declined for a century thereafter to a low of fewer than 18,000 in the 1970s. Declines were particularly significant in the outlying islands, some of which remain vulnerable to ongoing losses. Although Orkney is in many ways very distinct from the other islands and archipelagos of Scotland these trends are very similar to those experienced elsewhere. The archipelago's population grew by 11% in the decade to 2011 as recorded by the census. During the same period Scottish island populations as a whole grew by 4% to 103,702.

Genetic studies have shown that 25% of the gene pool of Orkney derives from Norwegian ancestors who occupied the islands in the 9th century.

== Current demographics ==
In 2022 the census recorded a total population of 21,958 an increase of 2.85% since 2011 and of which 17,805 (81%) lived on the mainland.

The most numerous non-British residents were from Ireland (125 persons) and Poland (98 persons). 352 individuals were recorded as belonging to non-white ethnic groups of whom just over half were of Asian origin.

36% of the population identified as Christian, with 27% adhering to the Church of Scotland and 2.7% being Roman Catholic. Just under 2% professed to another religion of which the largest group was 197 individuals recorded as pagan. 62% of the population stated they had no religion or did not provide an answer to this question. The main language of all but 238 individuals over the age of 3 was either English or Scots.

== Geography ==
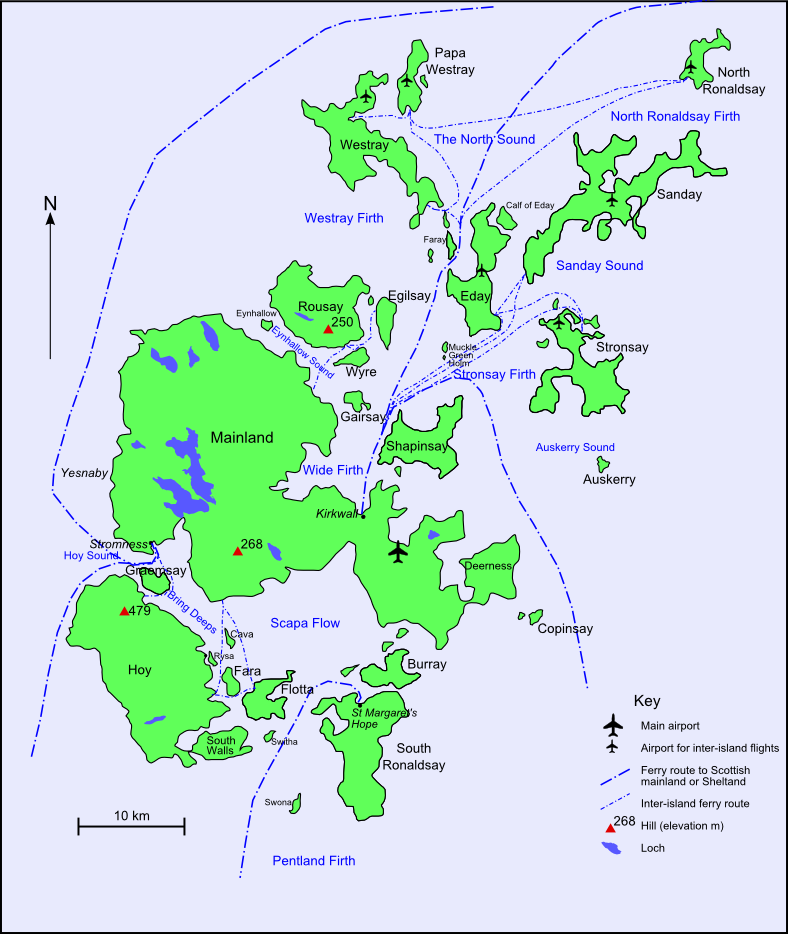
Map of Orkney showing main transport routes

Orkney is separated from the mainland of Scotland by the Pentland Firth, a ten-kilometre-wide (6 mi) seaway between Brough Ness on the island of South Ronaldsay and Duncansby Head in Caithness. Orkney lies between 58°41′ and 59°24′ north, and 2°22′ and 3°26′ west, measuring 80 kilometres (50 mi) from northeast to southwest and 47 kilometres (29 mi) from east to west, and covers 975 square kilometres (376 sq mi).

Orkney is separated from the Shetland Islands, a group further out, by a body of water called the Fair Isle Channel.

The islands are mainly low-lying except for some sharply rising sandstone hills on Mainland, Rousay and Hoy (where the tallest point in Orkney, Ward Hill, can be found) and rugged cliffs on some western coasts. Nearly all of the islands have lochs, but the watercourses are merely streams draining the high land. The coastlines are indented, and the islands themselves are divided from each other by straits generally called "sounds" or "firths".

The tidal currents, or "roosts" as some of them are called locally, off many of the isles are swift, with frequent whirlpools. (Note: For example, at the Fall of Warness the tide can run at 4 m/s (7.8 knots).) The islands are notable for the absence of trees, which is partly accounted for by the strong winds.

=== Settlements ===
Orkney (Orkney Islands)

Only three settlements have a population of over 500; the towns of Kirkwall and Stromness and the village of Finstown.

Major settlements in Orkney
Settlement	Population (2020)
Kirkwall	7,500
Stromness	1,790
Finstown	500

Other villages include Balfour, Dounby, Houton, Longhope, Lyness, Pierowall, St Margaret's Hope, and Whitehall.

List of largest islands by population
Island	Population (2011)
Orkney Mainland	17,162
South Ronaldsay	909
Westray	588
Sanday	494
Hoy	419
Burray	409
Stronsay	349
Shapinsay	307
Rousay	216
Eday	160

=== Geology ===
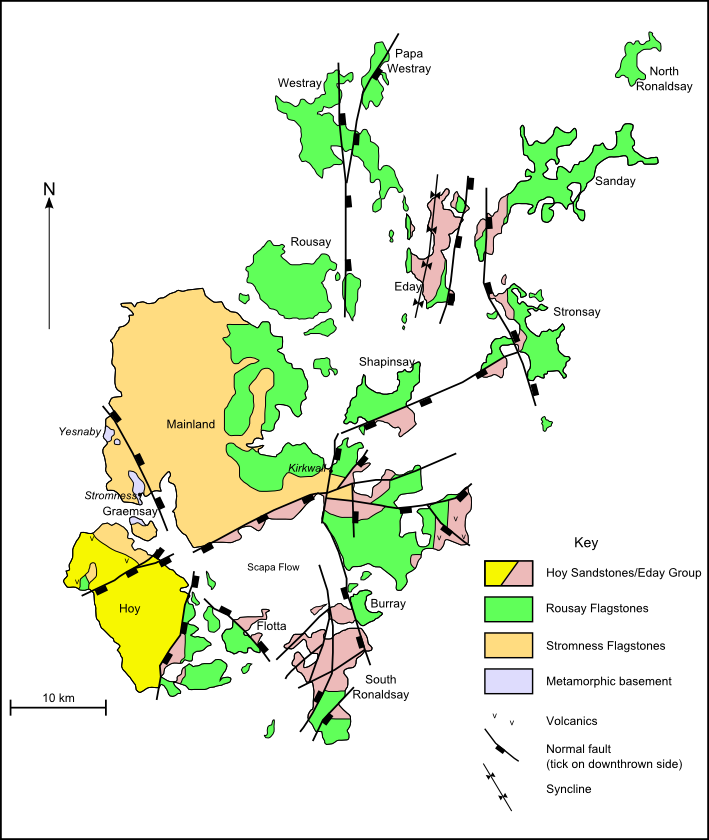
Geology of Orkney

The superficial rock of Orkney is almost entirely Old Red Sandstone, mostly of Middle Devonian age. As in the neighbouring mainland county of Caithness, this sandstone rests upon the metamorphic and igneous rocks of the Moine series, as may be seen on the Mainland, where a narrow strip is exposed between Stromness and Inganess, and again in the small island of Graemsay; they are represented by grey gneiss and granite.

The Middle Devonian is divided into three main groups. The lower part of the sequence, mostly Eifelian in age, is dominated by lacustrine beds of the lower and upper Stromness Flagstones that were deposited in Lake Orcadie. The later Rousay flagstone formation is found throughout much of the North and South Isles and East Mainland.

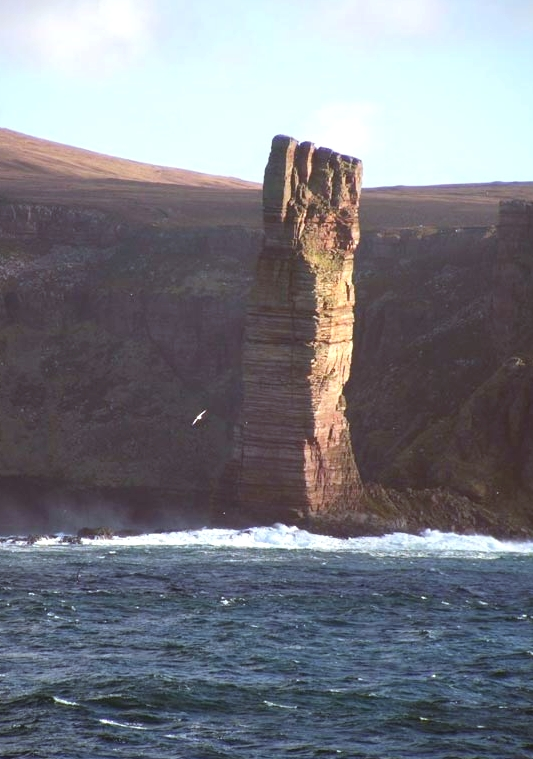
The Old Man of Hoy

The Old Man of Hoy is formed from sandstone of the uppermost Eday Group that is up to 800 metres (2,600 ft) thick in places. It lies unconformably upon steeply inclined flagstones, the interpretation of which is a matter of continuing debate.

The Devonian and older rocks of Orkney are cut by a series of WSW–ENE to N–S trending faults, many of which were active during deposition of the Devonian sequences.

Middle Devonian basaltic volcanic rocks are found on western Hoy, on Deerness in eastern Mainland and on Shapinsay. Correlation between the Hoy volcanics and the other two exposures has been proposed, but differences in chemistry mean this remains uncertain. Lamprophyre dykes of Late Permian age are found throughout Orkney.

Glacial striation and the presence of chalk and flint erratics that originated from the bed of the North Sea demonstrate the influence of ice action on the geomorphology of the islands. Boulder clay is also abundant and moraines cover substantial areas.

=== Climate ===
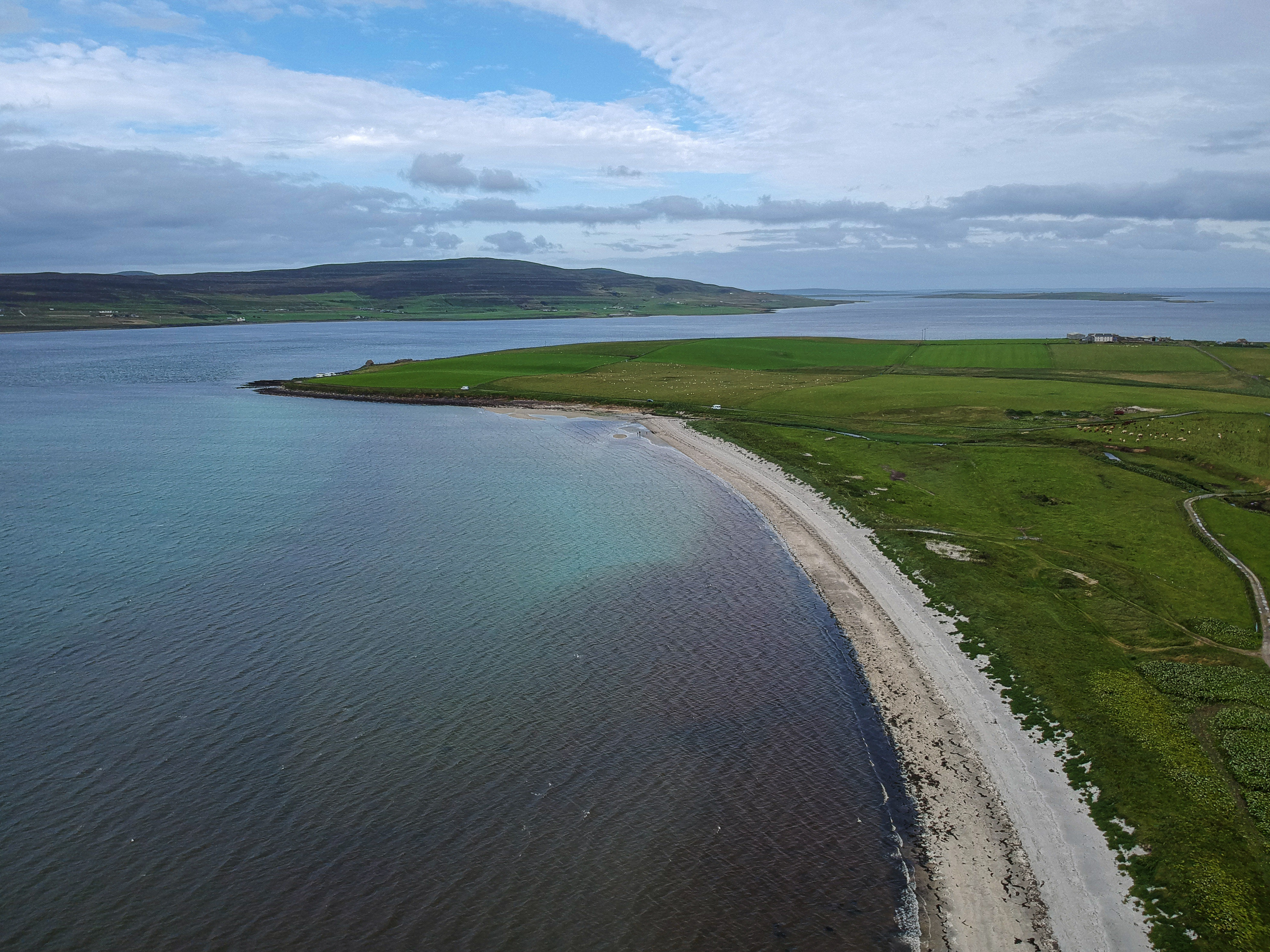
Aerial image of Sands of Evie, a beach near Stenso, Mainland

Orkney has a cool temperate climate that is remarkably mild and steady for such a northerly latitude, due to the influence of the warm waters of the Norwegian Current, a north-easterly extension of the North Atlantic Drift which is itself an extension of the Gulf Stream. The average temperature for the year is 8 °C (46 °F); for winter 4 °C (39 °F) and for summer 12 °C (54 °F).

The average annual rainfall varies from 850 millimetres (33 in) to 1,060 millimetres (42 in). Winds are a key feature of the climate and even in summer there are almost constant breezes. In winter, there are frequent strong winds, with an average of 52 hours of gales being recorded annually.

To tourists, one of the fascinations of the islands is their "nightless" summers. On the longest day, the sun rises at 04:00 and sets at 22:29 BST and complete darkness is unknown. This long twilight is known in the Northern Isles as the "simmer dim". Winter nights are long. On the shortest day the sun rises at 09:05 and sets at 15:16. At this time of year the aurora borealis can occasionally be seen on the northern horizon during moderate auroral activity.

The first averages table below is for the largest settlement Kirkwall's weather station, the second is for the Loch of Hundland, a rural location to the northwest of Mainland.

Climate data for Kirkwall, 26m asl, 1991–2020 normals, Extremes 1951–
Month	Jan	Feb	Mar	Apr	May	Jun	Jul	Aug	Sep	Oct	Nov	Dec	Year
Record high °C (°F)	12.2 (54.0)	12.8 (55.0)	18.9 (66.0)	21.0 (69.8)	22.0 (71.6)	22.8 (73.0)	25.6 (78.1)	24.8 (76.6)	22.8 (73.0)	19.4 (66.9)	14.5 (58.1)	12.9 (55.2)	25.6 (78.1)
Mean maximum °C (°F)	9.9 (49.8)	10.4 (50.7)	12.3 (54.1)	14.5 (58.1)	17.4 (63.3)	19.1 (66.4)	20.6 (69.1)	20.1 (68.2)	18.7 (65.7)	15.1 (59.2)	12.4 (54.3)	11.0 (51.8)	21.5 (70.7)
Mean daily maximum °C (°F)	6.6 (43.9)	6.8 (44.2)	8.0 (46.4)	9.9 (49.8)	12.2 (54.0)	14.2 (57.6)	16.1 (61.0)	16.2 (61.2)	14.4 (57.9)	11.6 (52.9)	8.9 (48.0)	7.0 (44.6)	11.0 (51.8)
Daily mean °C (°F)	4.5 (40.1)	4.5 (40.1)	5.4 (41.7)	7.0 (44.6)	8.5 (47.3)	11.3 (52.3)	13.2 (55.8)	13.4 (56.1)	11.8 (53.2)	9.3 (48.7)	6.7 (44.1)	4.8 (40.6)	8.4 (47.1)
Mean daily minimum °C (°F)	2.3 (36.1)	2.1 (35.8)	2.7 (36.9)	4.1 (39.4)	5.8 (42.4)	8.4 (47.1)	10.3 (50.5)	10.5 (50.9)	9.2 (48.6)	7.0 (44.6)	4.5 (40.1)	2.6 (36.7)	5.8 (42.4)
Mean minimum °C (°F)	−1.6 (29.1)	−1.9 (28.6)	−1.7 (28.9)	−0.3 (31.5)	1.1 (34.0)	4.3 (39.7)	6.3 (43.3)	6.3 (43.3)	4.4 (39.9)	2.2 (36.0)	0.3 (32.5)	−1.7 (28.9)	−3.2 (26.2)
Record low °C (°F)	−7.8 (18.0)	−7 (19)	−6.8 (19.8)	−4.9 (23.2)	−2.1 (28.2)	1.0 (33.8)	0.0 (32.0)	3.7 (38.7)	0.5 (32.9)	−1.6 (29.1)	−5.5 (22.1)	−7.6 (18.3)	−7.8 (18.0)
Average precipitation mm (inches)	114.7 (4.52)	96.2 (3.79)	86.7 (3.41)	59.2 (2.33)	53.8 (2.12)	55.9 (2.20)	58.2 (2.29)	73.0 (2.87)	90.7 (3.57)	119.8 (4.72)	126.1 (4.96)	114.3 (4.50)	1,048.6 (41.28)
Average precipitation days (≥ 1.0 mm)	20.4	17.6	16.9	14.1	11.9	10.8	12.1	12.6	15.2	19.1	20.5	19.9	191.1
Mean monthly sunshine hours	34	64	102	144	193	145	139	135	108	76	44	26	1,210
Source 1: Met Office
Source 2: Royal Dutch Meteorological Institute/KMNI Infoclimat

Climate data for Orkney: Loch of Hundland, 28m asl, 1991–2020
Month	Jan	Feb	Mar	Apr	May	Jun	Jul	Aug	Sep	Oct	Nov	Dec	Year
Mean daily maximum °C (°F)	6.6 (43.9)	6.8 (44.2)	8.0 (46.4)	10.2 (50.4)	12.8 (55.0)	14.6 (58.3)	16.6 (61.9)	16.5 (61.7)	14.5 (58.1)	11.6 (52.9)	8.9 (48.0)	7.0 (44.6)	11.2 (52.1)
Mean daily minimum °C (°F)	1.8 (35.2)	1.5 (34.7)	2.3 (36.1)	3.7 (38.7)	5.5 (41.9)	8.0 (46.4)	10.1 (50.2)	10.1 (50.2)	8.8 (47.8)	6.3 (43.3)	3.9 (39.0)	2.0 (35.6)	5.3 (41.6)
Average rainfall mm (inches)	121.6 (4.79)	91.8 (3.61)	85.4 (3.36)	61.4 (2.42)	54.2 (2.13)	53.0 (2.09)	59.5 (2.34)	70.6 (2.78)	92.2 (3.63)	122.5 (4.82)	127.6 (5.02)	116.2 (4.57)	1,056 (41.56)
Average rainy days (≥ 1.0 mm)	20.5	17.8	17.4	13.7	11.8	11.2	11.8	12.9	15.0	19.5	21.7	21.6	194.9
Mean monthly sunshine hours	27.4	58.4	97.4	147.8	199.7	146.9	137.9	135.6	97.2	71.5	37.5	21.3	1,178.6
Source: metoffice.gov.uk

== Governance ==
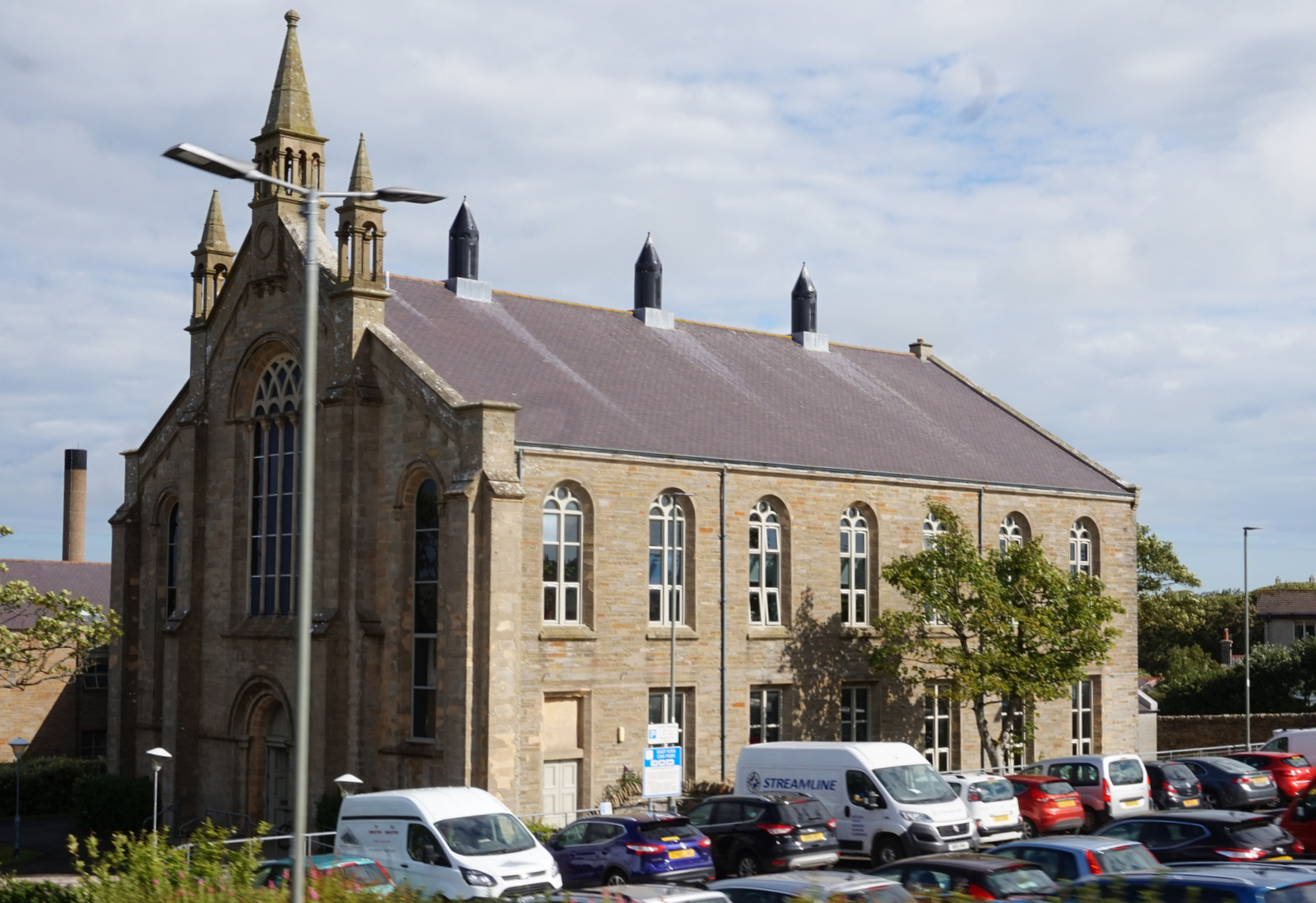
Council Offices on School Place, Kirkwall

The local authority is the Orkney Islands Council, based at the Council Offices on School Place in Kirkwall.

=== Administrative history ===
On its absorption into Scotland in 1472, the landholdings and jurisdictions of the old earldom of Orkney passed to the Scottish crown. The separate lordship of Shetland was absorbed into Scotland at the same time. More typically Scottish forms of administration were gradually introduced to the Northern Isles. The position of Sheriff of Orkney and Shetland was created in 1541. Orkney and Shetland retained their own legal systems until 1612, when the general laws of Scotland were applied.

Commissioners of Supply were established in 1667 for each shire across Scotland. Unusually, despite being one shire, Orkney and Shetland were given separate bodies of commissioners. More local government functions were gradually given to the commissioners over time. At a court case in 1829, the Court of Session declined to rule on whether Orkney and Shetland were one county or two. They operated as one county for the purposes of the administration of justice, lieutenancy, and parliamentary constituencies, but operated as two counties for local government functions. Elected county councils were created in 1890 under the Local Government (Scotland) Act 1889, taking most of the functions of the commissioners (which were eventually abolished in 1930). The 1889 Act also directed that Orkney and Shetland were to be separate counties.

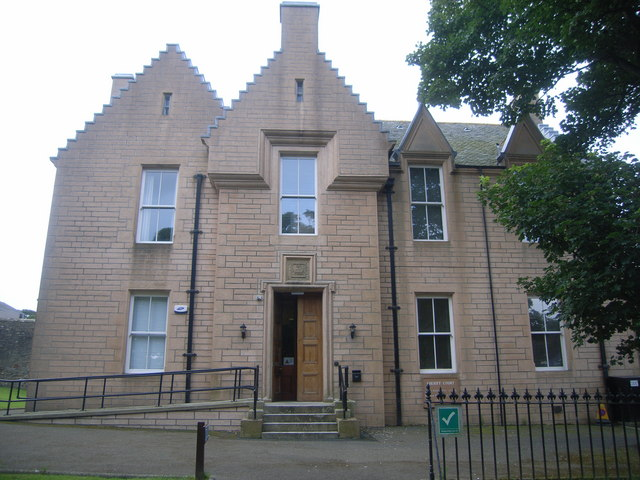
Kirkwall Sheriff Court, completed 1877: Orkney's main courthouse, also served as headquarters of Orkney County Council 1890–1975

Orkney County Council held its first meeting on 22 May 1890 at Kirkwall Sheriff Court, also known as County Buildings, on Watergate in Kirkwall, which had been completed in 1877 and also served as the meeting place of the commissioners of supply.

Local government was reformed in 1975 under the Local Government (Scotland) Act 1973, which replaced Scotland's counties, burghs and landward districts. In most of Scotland a two-tier structure of upper-tier regions and lower-tier districts was used, but a single-tier structure of island areas was used for Orkney, Shetland and the Western Isles. Further local government reform in 1996 introduced single-tier council areas across all of Scotland. The councils of the three island areas created in 1975 continued to provide the same services after 1996, but their areas were re-designated as council areas.

== Parishes and communities ==
Parishes existed from medieval times. From 1845 to 1894 they had parish boards and from 1894 to 1930 they had parish councils. They have had no administrative functions since 1930, but continue to be used for the presentation of statistics.

Orkney's civil parishes are:

- Birsay and Harray
- Cross and Burness
- Eday
- Evie and Rendall
- Firth
- Holm
- Hoy and Graemsay
- Kirkwall and St Ola (included burgh of Kirkwall)
- Lady
- Orphir
- Papa Westray
- Rousay
- St Andrews and Deerness
- Sandwick
- Shapinsay
- South Ronaldsay
- Stenness
- Stromness (included burgh of same name)
- Stronsay
- Walls and Flotta
- Westray

Evie and Rendall were formerly separate parishes, but were united in the 16th century.

=== Community councils ===
Community councils were created in 1975 as part of the wider reforms that year. They have no statutory powers, but serve as a representative body for their communities. Orkney Islands Council designates community council areas, but a community council is only formed if there is sufficient interest from the residents. Since a review in 2022, Orkney has comprised the following communities, all of which have community councils operating as at 2024:

- Birsay
- Eday
- Evie and Rendall
- Firth and Stenness
- Flotta
- Graemsay, Hoy and Walls
- Harray and Sandwick
- Holm
- Kirkwall and St Ola
- North Ronaldsay
- Orphir
- Papa Westray
- Rousay, Egilsay, Wyre and Gairsay
- St Andrews and Deerness
- Sanday
- Shapinsay
- South Ronaldsay and Burray
- Stromness
- Stronsay
- Westray

== Islands ==
=== The Mainland ===
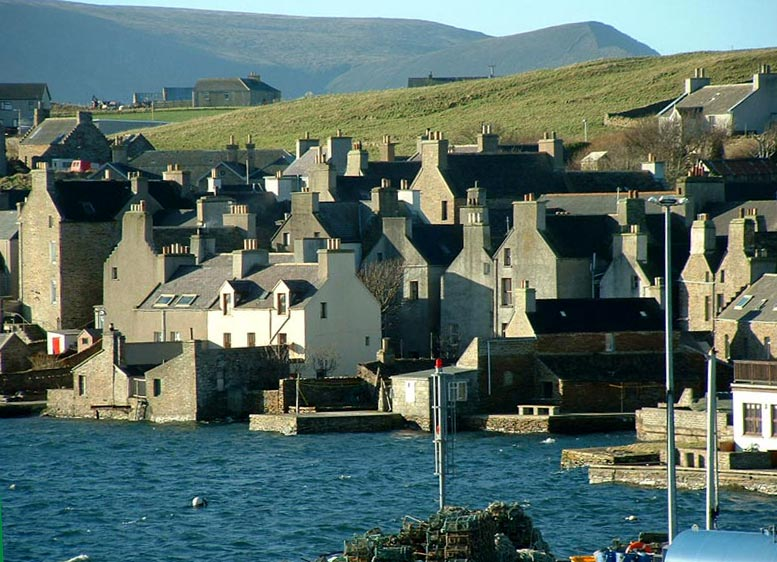
Stromness on the Mainland is the second-largest settlement in Orkney.

The Mainland is the largest island of Orkney. Both of Orkney's burghs, Kirkwall and Stromness, are on this island, which is also the heart of Orkney's transport system, with ferry and air connections to the other islands and to the outside world. The island is more heavily populated (75% of Orkney's population) than the other islands and has much fertile farmland. The Mainland is split into areas called East and West Mainland. These areas are determined by whether they lie east or west of Kirkwall. The bulk of the mainland lies west of Kirkwall, with comparatively little land east of Kirkwall. West Mainland parishes are: Stromness, Sandwick, Birsay, Harray, Stenness, Orphir, Evie, Rendall and Firth. East Mainland Parishes are: St Ola, Tankerness, St Andrews, Holm and Deerness.

The island is mostly low-lying (especially East Mainland) but with coastal cliffs to the north and west and two sizeable lochs: the Loch of Harray and the Loch of Stenness. The Mainland contains the remnants of numerous Neolithic, Pictish and Viking constructions. Four of the main Neolithic sites are included in the Heart of Neolithic Orkney World Heritage Site, inscribed in 1999.

The other islands in the group are classified as north or south of the Mainland. Exceptions are the remote islets of Sule Skerry and Sule Stack, which lie 60 kilometres (37 mi) west of the archipelago, but form part of Orkney for local government purposes. In island names, the suffix "a" or "ay" represents the Norse ey, meaning "island". Those described as "holms" are very small.

=== The North Isles ===
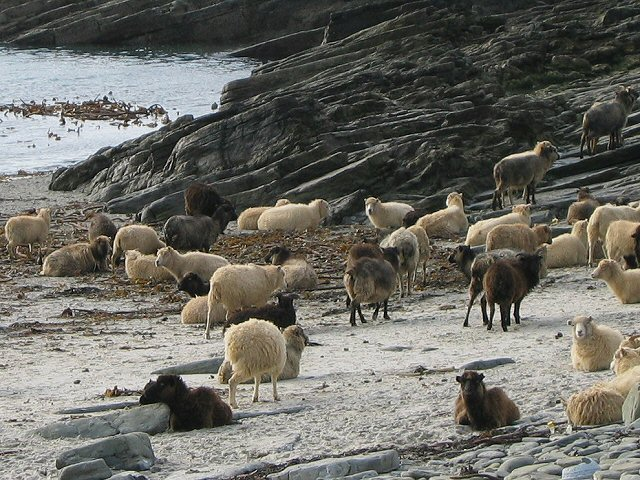
North Ronaldsay sheep are a semi-feral breed that has evolved to eat seaweed. Their unique genetic inheritance makes them of interest to conservationists.

The northern group of islands is the most extensive and consists of a large number of moderately sized islands, linked to the Mainland by ferries and by air services. Farming, fishing and tourism are the main sources of income for most of the islands.

The most northerly is North Ronaldsay, which lies 4 kilometres (2 mi) beyond its nearest neighbour, Sanday. To the west is Westray, which has a population of 550. It is connected by ferry and air to Papa Westray, also known as "Papay". Eday is at the centre of the North Isles. The centre of the island is moorland and the island's main industries have been peat extraction and limestone quarrying.

Rousay, Egilsay and Gairsay lie north of the west Mainland across the Eynhallow Sound. Rousay is well known for its ancient monuments, including the Quoyness chambered cairn and Egilsay has the ruins of the only round-towered church in Orkney. Wyre to the south-east contains the site of Cubbie Roo's castle. Stronsay and Papa Stronsay lie much further to the east across the Stronsay Firth. Auskerry is south of Stronsay and has a population of only five. Shapinsay and its Balfour Castle are a short distance north of Kirkwall.

Other small uninhabited islands in the North Isles group include Calf of Eday, Damsay, Eynhallow, Faray, Helliar Holm, Holm of Faray, Holm of Huip, Holm of Papa, Holm of Scockness, Kili Holm, Linga Holm, Muckle Green Holm, Rusk Holm and Sweyn Holm.

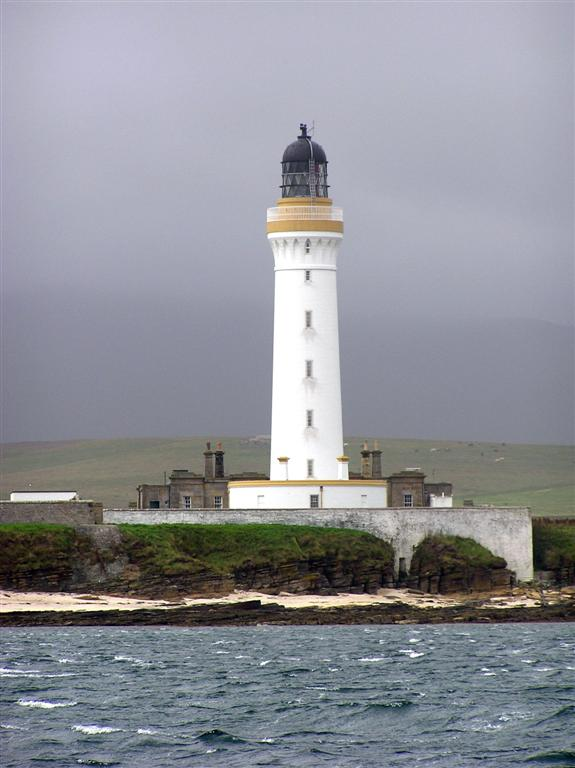
Hoy High Lighthouse on Graemsay

=== The South Isles ===
The southern group of islands surrounds Scapa Flow. Hoy, to the west, is the second largest of the Orkney Isles and Ward Hill at its northern end is the highest elevation in the archipelago. The Old Man of Hoy is a well-known seastack. Graemsay and Flotta are both linked by ferry to the Mainland and Hoy, and the latter is known for its large oil terminal. South Walls has a 19th-century Martello tower and is connected to Hoy by the Ayre. Burray lies to the east of Scapa Flow and is linked by causeway to South Ronaldsay, which hosts cultural events such as the Festival of the Horse and the Boys' Ploughing Match on the third Saturday in August. It is also the location of the Neolithic Tomb of the Eagles. South Ronaldsay, Burray, Glimps Holm, and Lamb Holm are connected by road to the Mainland by the Churchill Barriers.

Uninhabited South Islands include Calf of Flotta, Cava, Copinsay, Corn Holm, Fara, Glimps Holm, Hunda, Lamb Holm, Rysa Little, Switha and Swona. The Pentland Skerries lie further south, closer to the Scottish mainland.

== Politics ==
Orkney is represented in the House of Commons as part of the Orkney and Shetland constituency, which elects one Member of Parliament (MP), the current incumbent being Alistair Carmichael. This seat has been held by the Liberal Democrats or the former Liberal Party since 1950, longer than any other they represent in Great Britain.

In the Scottish Parliament the Orkney Islands constituency elects one Member of the Scottish Parliament (MSP) by the first past the post system. The current MSP is Liam McArthur of the Liberal Democrats. Before McArthur the MSP was Jim Wallace, who was previously Deputy First Minister. Orkney is within the Highlands and Islands electoral region.

The Orkney Movement, a political party that supported devolution for Orkney from the rest of Scotland, contested the 1987 general election as the Orkney and Shetland Movement (a coalition of the Orkney movement and its equivalent for Shetland). The Scottish National Party chose not to contest the seat to give the movement a "free run". Their candidate, John Goodlad, came 4th with 3,095 votes, 14.5% of those cast, but the experiment has not been repeated.

In the 2014 Scottish independence referendum 67.2% of voters in Orkney voted no to the question "Should Scotland be an independent country?" This was the highest no vote by percentage in any council area in Scotland ahead of Scottish Borders (66.6%), Dumfries and Galloway (65.7%) and Shetland (63.7%). Turnout for the referendum was at 83.7% in Orkney with 10,004 votes cast in the area against independence by comparison to 4,883 votes for independence. In the 2016 United Kingdom European Union membership referendum 63.2% of voters in Orkney voted Remain.

In 2022, as part of the Levelling Up White Paper, an "Island Forum" was proposed, which would allow local policymakers and residents in Orkney to work alongside their counterparts in Shetland, the Western Isles, Anglesey and the Isle of Wight on common issues, such as broadband connectivity, and provide a platform for them to communicate directly with the government on the challenges island communities face in terms of levelling up. In July 2023, Orkney Council investigated proposals to change its status, looking at options that included becoming a British Crown Dependency, a self-governing territory within the Kingdom of Norway or just staying in the United Kingdom. In June 2026, this investigation was ended, concluding that options for greater autonomy would be too expensive or too difficult.

== Economy ==
The percentage of the Orkney population who are economically active is consistently higher than the Scottish average. In 2023 it was 89.8% compared to 77.9% for the latter, in which year average unemployment was 1.6%.

The soil of Orkney is generally very fertile and most of the land is taken up by farms, agriculture being by far the most important sector of the economy and providing employment for a quarter of the workforce according to a 2008 report. More than 90% of agricultural land is used for grazing for sheep and cattle, with cereal production utilising about 4% (3,800 hectares (9,400 acres)) and woodland occupying only 91 hectares (220 acres). 44% of Orkney businesses are in the agriculture, forestry and fishing sector. 90% of the islands' milk production goes towards the manufacture of Orkney Cheddar cheese.

Fishing has declined in importance, but still employed 238 individuals in 2023, just under 4% of the islands' total employment. The modern industry concentrating on herring, white fish, lobsters, crabs and other shellfish, and salmon fish farming. (Note: Coull (2003) quotes the old saying that an Orcadian is a farmer with a boat, in contrast to a Shetlander, who is a fisherman with a croft.)

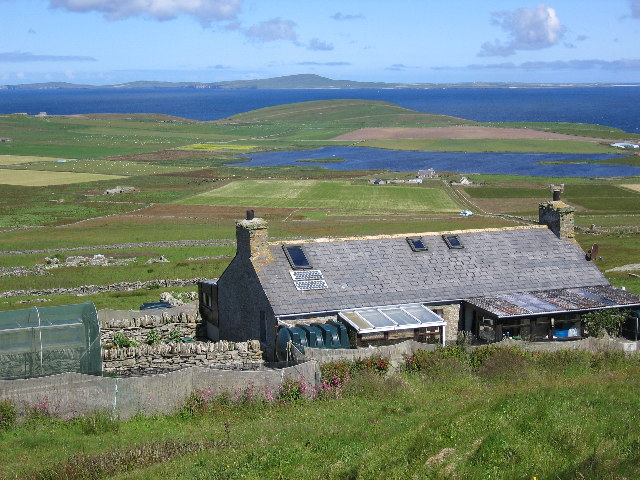
Farms and fields on Rousay

A 2009 report indicated the traditional sectors of the economy export beef, cheese, whisky, beer, fish and other seafood. In recent years there has been growth in other areas including tourism, food and beverage manufacture, jewellery, knitwear, and other crafts production, construction and oil transportation through the Flotta oil terminal.

There are three Scotch whisky distilleries in Orkney: Scapa, Highland Park and the Deerness Distillery, which opened in 2023.

Other important sectors of the economy include manufacturing and construction, retailing, hotels and restaurants and public sector activities such as health and social work.

As of 2020

there are around 1,500 businesses on the island. More than 90% have fewer than 10 employees. [Estimates indicate] 11,000 jobs, of which around 5,000 are part-time ... There's not much manufacturing, beyond food and drink processing (think cheese and whisky), and apart from the Flotta oil terminal, it lacks big private employers ... Fisheries off Orkney are only half as important to employment as in Shetland, and farming is roughly twice as important.

=== Tourism ===
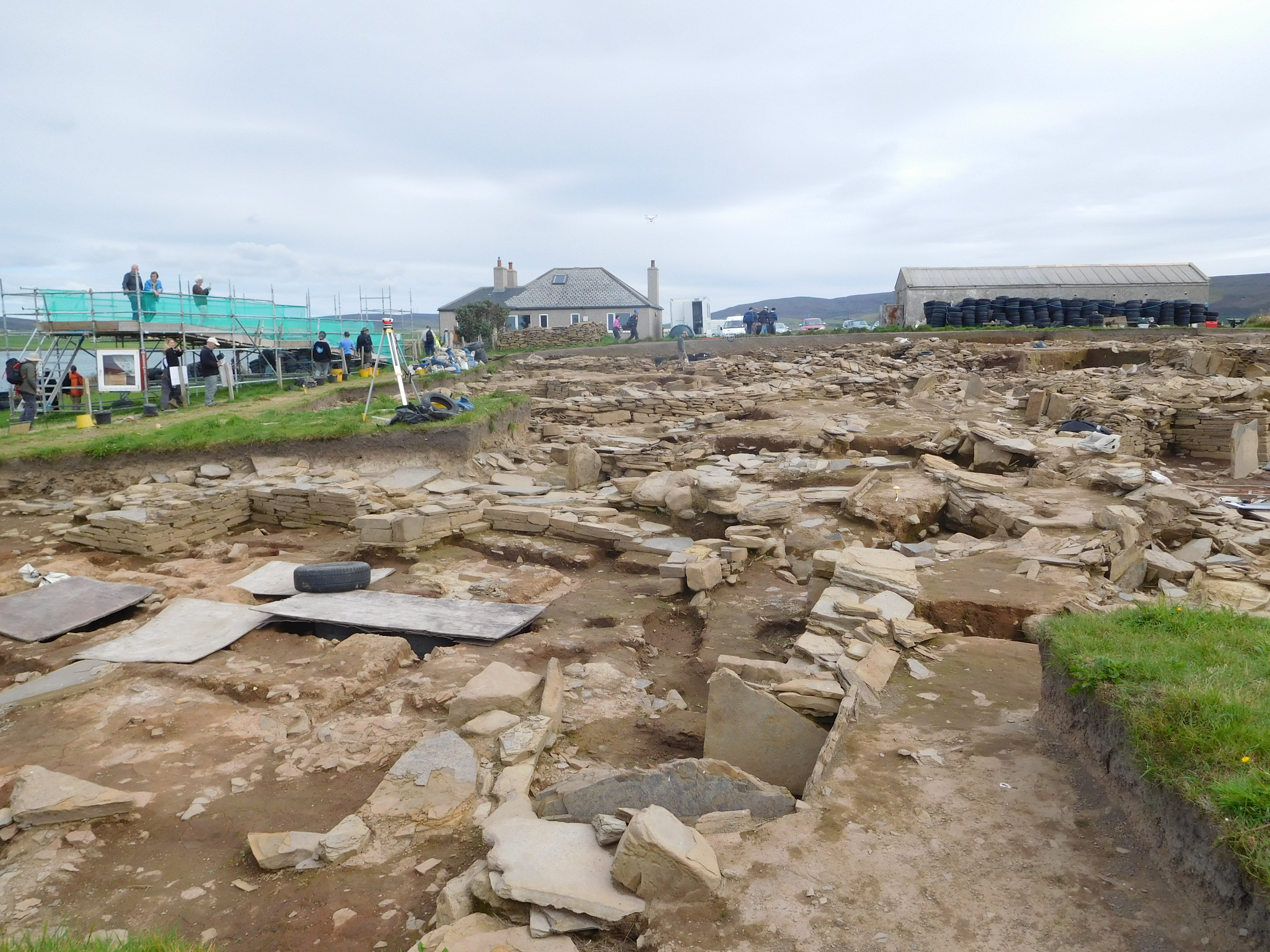
Excavations by UHI Archaeology Institute at the Ness of Brodgar have contributed to Orkney's heritage tourism.

A report published in February 2020 stated that spending by visitors increased from £49.5 million in 2017 to £67.1 million in 2019, making this a significant sector of the economy. The primary attractions that encourage tourism include the "Heart of Neolithic Orkney" on the main island, defined as "a group of 5,000-year-old sites that include the preserved village of Skara Brae and the Ring of Brodgar stone circle". The Hoy area's landscape is also attractive to visitors, "with its scattered woodland, steep valleys, high cliffs and the famous Old Man, a withered red sandstone sea stack". In 2017, 62% of tourists to Orkney visited for its heritage. The UHI Archaeology Institute have led excavations at the Ness of Brodgar, contributing to tourism to the area and driving interest in archaeology.

During most years, the islands are the home of several international festivals, including the Orkney International Science Festival in September, a folk festival in May, and the St Magnus International Arts Festival in June.

The volume of visitors arriving on ferries declined substantially in 2020, by 71%, due to the COVID-19 pandemic. A news report added that cruise ships also did not arrive and there were "no day trippers and no holiday lets" as of 25 April 2020. Several major events were cancelled: St Magnus Festival, Orkney Folk Festival, Stromness Shopping Week and the Agricultural Shows.

=== Power ===
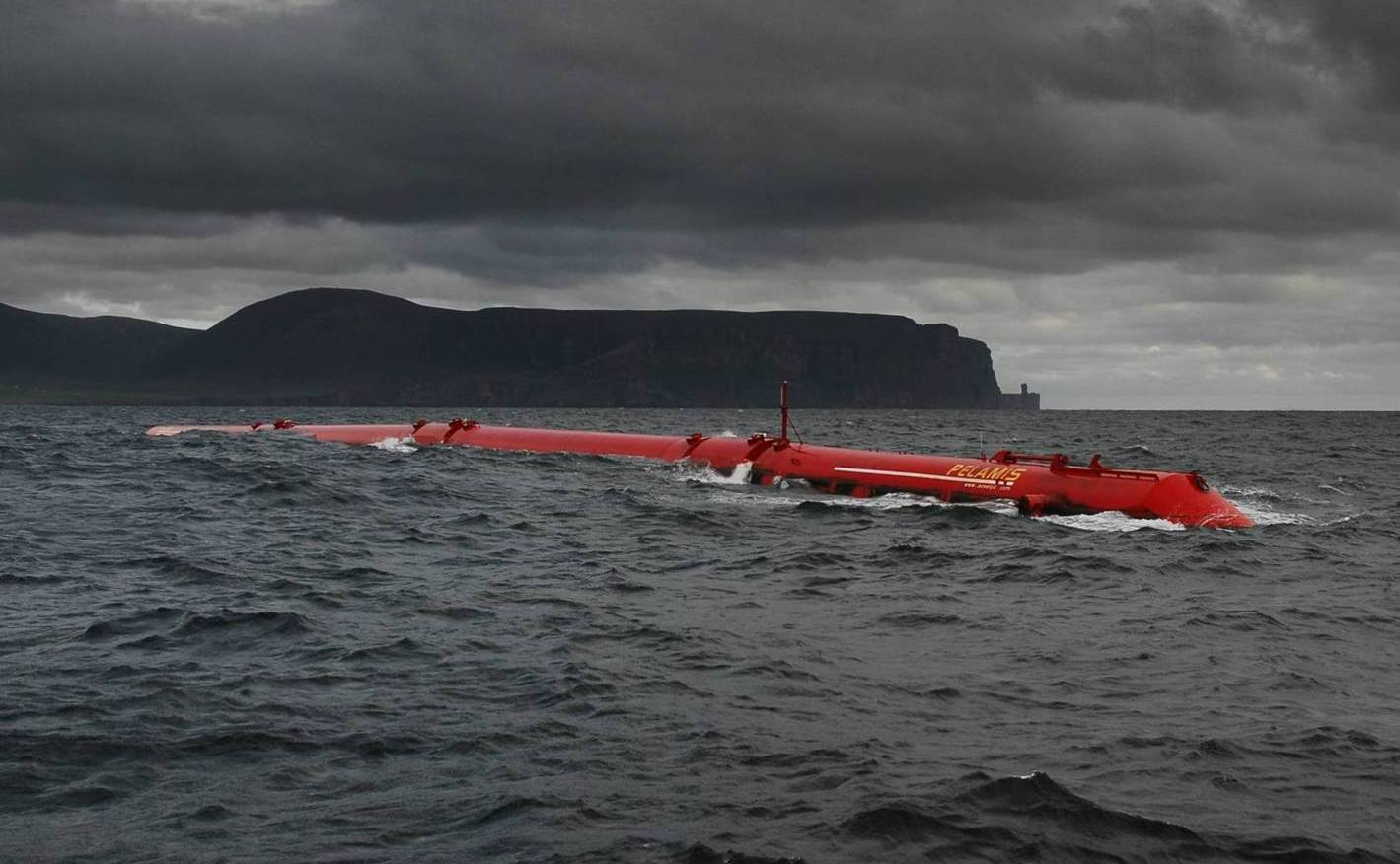
Pelamis on-site at EMEC's wave testing site off Billia Croo

Orkney has significant wind and marine energy resources, and renewable energy has recently come into prominence. Although Orkney is connected to the mainland, it generates over 100% of its net power from renewables according to a 2015 report. This comes mainly from wind turbines situated across Orkney.

The European Marine Energy Centre (EMEC) is a research facility operating a grid-connected wave test site at Billia Croo, off the west coast of the Orkney Mainland, and a tidal power test site in the Fall of Warness, off the northern island of Eday. At the official opening of the Eday project the site was described as "the first of its kind in the world set up to provide developers of wave and tidal energy devices with a purpose-built performance testing facility." (Note: " The centre offers developers the opportunity to test prototype devices in unrivalled wave and tidal conditions. Wave and tidal energy converters are connected to the national grid via seabed cables running from open-water test berths into an onshore substation. Testing takes place in a wide range of sea and weather conditions, with comprehensive round-the-clock monitoring.")

During 2007 Scottish and Southern Energy plc in conjunction with the University of Strathclyde began the implementation of a Regional Power Zone in the Orkney archipelago, involving "active network management" that will make better use of existing infrastructure and allow a further 15 MW of new "non-firm generation" output from renewables onto the network. 1.5 MW of polymer electrolyte membrane electrolysis form a partial hydrogen economy for hydrogen vehicles and district heating, and grid batteries and electric vehicles also use local energy.

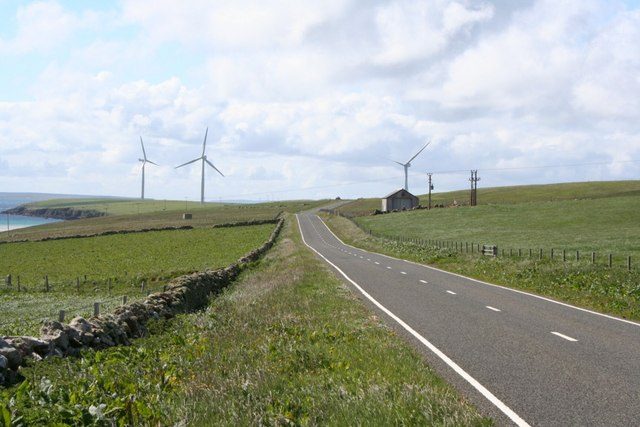
Wind turbines, Sanday

Orkney has one of the highest uptakes of electric vehicles in the UK with more than 2% of the vehicles on the road being electric, as of 2019.

==== Hydrogen manufacturing ====
A March 2019 report by the BBC stated that "Orkney creates more clean electricity than its inhabitants need. Even after exporting to the UK national grid, the islands' winds, waves and tides generate about 130% of the electricity its population needs – all of it from clean sources". A report about sustainable energy in the islands listed two options. A new cable could be laid for exporting of energy to the mainland but another proposal has progressed rapidly since that time: making "excess renewable power into another fuel – such as hydrogen – and then [storing] it".

In May 2020, CNN published more specific information about the hydrogen plan:

Orkney's success in creating hydrogen using clean energy demonstrates that it can be done at scale. The islands are already using hydrogen to power vehicles, and it will soon be used to heat a local primary school. Now, Orkney is hoping to use hydrogen fuel cells to power a seagoing vessel able to transport both goods and passengers.

Additional specific information about the status of the hydrogen scheme was published in late November 2020 by Orkney Islands Council. A few weeks earlier, another report indicated that the world's first hydrogen-fuelled ferry was to be tested on the Orkney Islands, using "a hydrogen/diesel dual fuel conversion system", developed by a consortium known as the HyDIME project. Initially hydrogen was to power only the auxiliary engine but the plan calls for later using this fuel for the primary engine. The report suggested that "if all goes well, hydrogen ferries could be sailing between Orkney's islands within six months".

Kirkwall Airport in Orkney was scheduled "to have its heat and power decarbonised through green hydrogen as part of a new project" starting in 2021. A hydrogen combustion engine system was to be connected to the airport's heating system. The scheme planned to reduce the significant emissions that were created with older technology that heated buildings and water. This was part of the plan formulated by the Scottish government for the Highlands and Islands "to become the world's first net zero aviation region by 2040".

Hydrogen manufacturing is also planned for Shetland and will spread to other areas of Scotland that have access to clean electricity. To achieve that goal, the government announced an investment of £100 million in the hydrogen sector "for the £180 million Emerging Energy Technologies Fund".

=== Transport ===
==== Air ====
Highland and Islands Airports operates the main airport in Orkney, Kirkwall Airport. Loganair provides services to the Scottish mainland (Aberdeen, Edinburgh, Glasgow and Inverness), as well as to Sumburgh Airport in Shetland.

Within Orkney, the council operates airports on most of the larger islands including Stronsay, Eday, North Ronaldsay, Westray, Papa Westray, Sanday, and Flotta. The shortest scheduled air service in the world, between the islands of Westray and Papa Westray, is scheduled at two minutes' duration.

==== Ferry ====
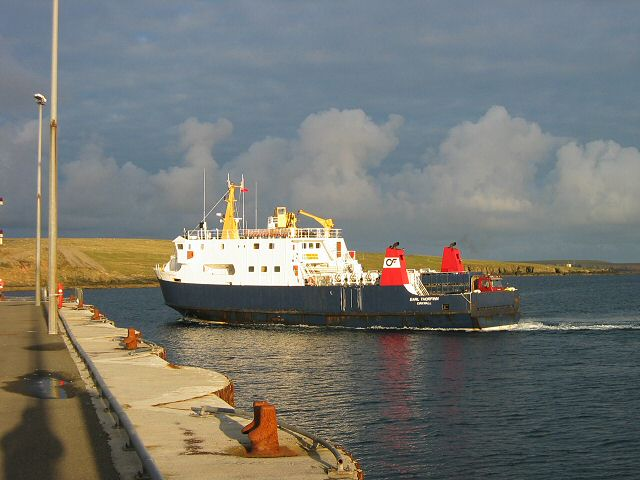
MV Earl Thorfinn arrives at Westray. Orkney Ferries operate a fleet of inter-island ferries.

Ferries serve both to link Orkney to the rest of Scotland, and also to link together the various islands of the Orkney archipelago. Ferry services operate between Orkney and the Scottish mainland and Shetland on the following routes:

- Gills Bay to St Margaret's Hope (operated by Pentland Ferries)
- John o' Groats to Burwick on South Ronaldsay (seasonal passenger only service, operated by John o' Groats Ferries)
- Lerwick to Kirkwall (operated by NorthLink Ferries)
- Aberdeen to Kirkwall (operated by NorthLink Ferries)
- Scrabster Harbour, Thurso to Stromness (operated by NorthLink Ferries).

Inter-island ferry services connect all the inhabited islands to Orkney Mainland and are operated by Orkney Ferries, a company owned by Orkney Islands Council. The isles of Westray, Papa Westray (or Papay), North Ronaldsay, Sanday, Eday, Stronsay, and Shapinsay are served from Kirkwall harbour, while the northern end of Hoy and Graemsay are served from Stromness harbour, the Lyness end of Hoy, as well as Longhope on South Walls, and Flotta are served from Houton on the south of the mainland, and Rousay, Egilsay and Wyre are served from Tingwall, in the Rendall area of the Orkney mainland. As well as this, the MV Golden Mariana connects the village of Pierowall on Westray with Papa Westray - this provides a vital local service for schoolchildren on Papay as well as supplementing existing through sailings from Kirkwall.

==== Bus ====
Local buses around the Orkney Mainland, as well as across the Churchill Barriers to Burray and South Ronaldsay, are operated by Stagecoach Highlands. There are also bus services on Sanday, Westray and Hoy & Walls.

In 2021, the island's three-vehicle minibus service for disabled people was a target for hackers seeking a £1,000 ransom in cryptocurrency.

=== Media ===
Orkney is served by a weekly local newspaper, The Orcadian, published on Thursdays. It is first published in 1854 and part of the Orkney Media Group, formed out of a partnership with a competing newspaper, Orkney Today, in 2007.

A local BBC radio station, BBC Radio Orkney, the local opt-out of BBC Radio Scotland, broadcasts twice daily, with local news and entertainment. Orkney also had a commercial radio station, The Superstation Orkney, which broadcast to Kirkwall and parts of the mainland and also to most of Caithness until its closure in November 2014. MFR broadcasts throughout Orkney on an FM transmitter just outside Thurso. The community radio station Caithness FM also broadcasts to Orkney.

Orkney is home to the Orkney Library and Archive, based in Kirkwall. The library service provides access to over 145,000 items. They have a wide range of fiction and non-fiction titles available for loan as well as audiobooks, maps, eBooks, music CDs, and DVDs. Orkney Library and Archive operates a Mobile Library Service that serves the rural parishes and islands of Orkney. The Mobile Library carries a wide range of books and audiobooks suitable for all ages and is completely free to use.

== Language, literature, and folklore ==
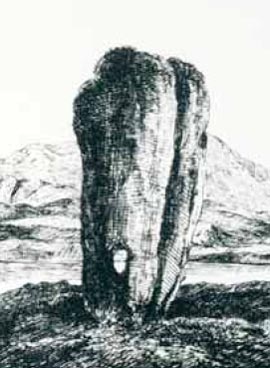
The Odin Stone

At the beginning of recorded history, the islands were inhabited by the Picts, whose language was Brythonic. (Note: There is convincing place-name evidence for the Picts' use of Brythonic or P-Celtic, although no written records survive. No certain knowledge of any pre-Pictish language exists anywhere in Scotland, but there may well have been times of significant overlap. For example, the early Scottish Earls spoke Gaelic when the majority of their subjects spoke Norn, and both of these languages were then replaced by Insular Scots. It is therefore possible that the Pictish aristocracy spoke one language and the common folk an unknown precursor such as Proto-Celtic.) The Ogham script on the Buckquoy spindle-whorl is cited as evidence for the pre-Norse existence of Old Irish in Orkney. (Note: Only two Q-Celtic words exist in the language of modern Orcadians – iper from eabhar, meaning a midden slurry, and keero from caora – used to describe a small sheep in the North Isles.)

After the Norse occupation, the toponymy of Orkney became almost wholly West Norse. The Norse language changed into the local Norn, which lingered until the end of the 18th century, when it eventually died out. Norn was replaced by the Orcadian dialect of Insular Scots. This dialect is at a low ebb due to the pervasive influences of television, education, and the large number of incomers. However, attempts are being made by some writers and radio presenters to revitalise its use and the distinctive sing-song accent and many dialect words of Norse origin remain in use. (Note: Lamb (2003) counted 60 words "with correlates in Old Norse only" and 500 Scots expressions in common use in the 1950s.) The Orcadian word most frequently encountered by visitors is peedie, meaning 'small', which may be derived from the French petit. (Note: The word is of uncertain origin and has also been attested in the Lothians and Fife in the 19th century.)

Orkney has a rich folklore, and many of the former tales concern trows, an Orcadian form of troll that draws on the islands' Scandinavian connections. Local customs in the past included marriage ceremonies at the Odin Stone that formed part of the Stones of Stenness.

The best known literary figures from modern Orkney are the poet Edwin Muir, the poet and novelist George Mackay Brown, and the novelist Eric Linklater.

=== Languages ===
The 2022 Scottish Census reported that out of 21,400 residents aged three and over, 8,278 (38.7%) considered themselves able to speak or read the Scots language.

The 2022 Scottish Census reported that out of 21,407 residents aged three and over, 177 (0.8%) considered themselves able to speak or read Gaelic.

== Orcadians ==
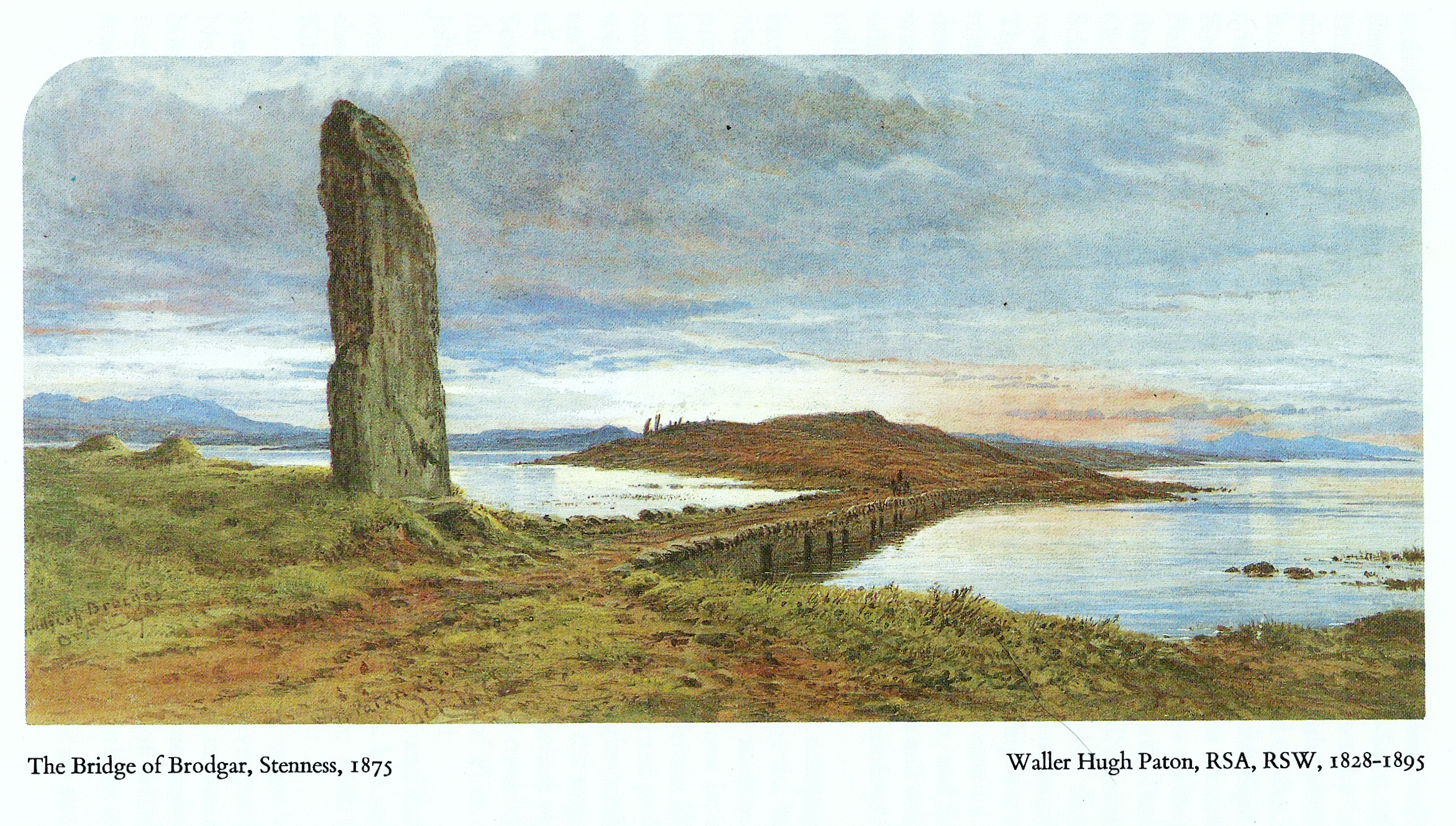
The Bridge of Brodgar, Stenness, 1875 by Walter Hugh Patton (1828–1895)

An Orcadian is a native of Orkney, a term that reflects a strongly held identity with a tradition of understatement. Although the annexation of the earldom by Scotland took place over five centuries ago in 1472, some Orcadians regard themselves as Orcadians first and Scots second. However, in response to the national identity question in the 2011 Scotland Census, self-reported levels of Scottish identity in Orkney were in line with the national average.

The Scottish mainland is often referred to as "Scotland" in Orkney, with "the mainland" referring to Mainland, Orkney. The archipelago also has a distinct culture, with traditions of the Scottish Highlands such as tartan, clans, bagpipes not indigenous to the culture of the islands. However, at least two tartans with Orkney connections have been registered and a tartan has been designed for Sanday by one of the island's residents, and there are pipe bands in Orkney.

Native Orcadians refer to the non-native residents of the islands as "ferry loupers" ("loup" meaning "jump" in the Scots language), a term that has been in use for nearly two centuries at least. (Note: The expression "ferry louper" has a literal meaning of "ferry jumper" i.e. one who has jumped off a ferry as distinct from a native.)

== Natural history ==
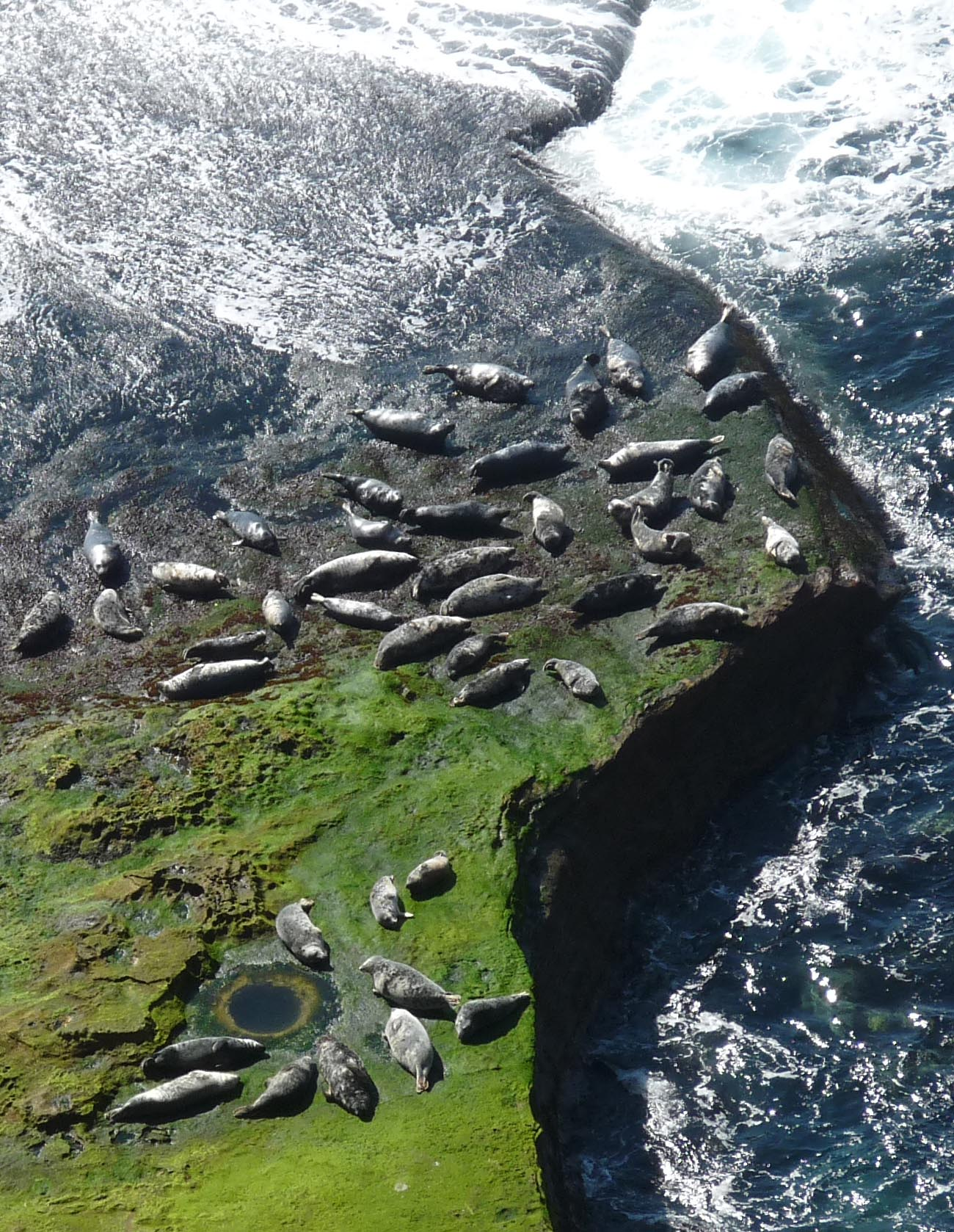
Seals hauled out at Lyrie Geo on Hoy

Orkney has an abundance of wildlife, especially of grey and common seals and seabirds such as puffins, kittiwakes, black guillemots (tysties), ravens, and great skuas (bonxies). Whales, dolphins, and otters are also seen around the coasts. Inland the Orkney vole, a distinct subspecies of the common vole introduced by Neolithic humans, is an endemic. There are five distinct varieties, found on the islands of Sanday, Westray, Rousay, South Ronaldsay, and the Mainland, all the more remarkable as the species is absent on mainland Britain.

The coastline is well known for its colourful flowers including sea aster, sea squill, sea thrift, common sea-lavender, bell and common heather. The Scottish primrose is found only on the coasts of Orkney and nearby Caithness and Sutherland. Although stands of trees are generally rare, a small forest named Happy Valley with 700 trees and lush gardens was created from a boggy hillside near Stenness during the second half of the 20th century.

The North Ronaldsay sheep is an unusual breed of domesticated animal, subsisting largely on a diet of seaweed, since they are confined to the foreshore for most of the year to conserve the limited grazing inland. The island was also a habitat for the Atlantic walrus until the mid-16th century.

The Orkney char (Salvelinus inframundus) used to live in Heldale Water on Hoy and has not been observed since 1908, so is now considered to be extinct.

=== Stoat problem and solution ===
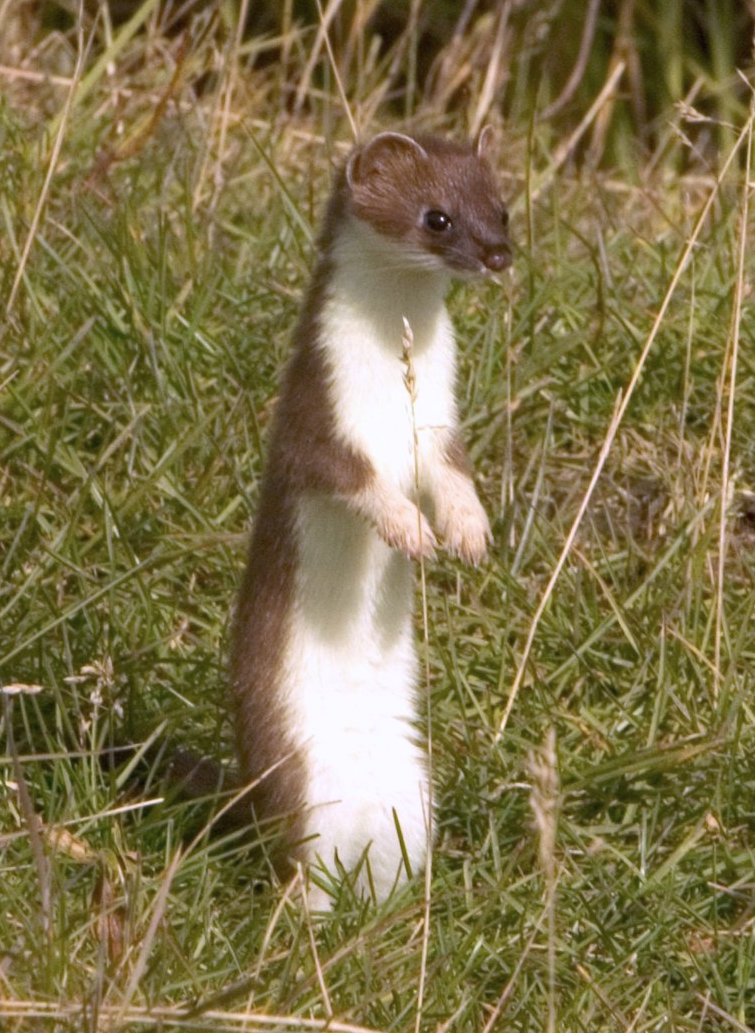
Stoat

The introduction of non-native stoats since 2010, a natural predator of the common vole and thus of the Orkney vole, was also harming native bird populations. NatureScot, Scotland's nature agency, provided these additional specifics:

The introduction of a ground predator like the stoat to islands such as Orkney, where there are no native ground predators, is very bad news for Orkney's native species. Stoats are accomplished predators and pose a very serious threat to Orkney's wildlife, including: the native Orkney vole, hen harrier, short-eared owl and many ground nesting birds.

In 2018, a stoat eradication project was presented by NatureScot to be applied "across Orkney Mainland, South Ronaldsay, Burray, Glimps Holm, Lamb Holm and Hunda, and the biosecurity activities delivered on the non-linked islands of the archipelago". The Orkney Native Wildlife Project planned to use "humane DOC150 and DOC200 traps". The partners in the five-year project include RSPB Scotland, Scottish Natural Heritage and Orkney Islands Council. A report issued in October 2020 stated that over 5,000 traps had been deployed. Specifics were provided as to the locations.

Not all was going well as of 15 January 2021, according to The Times, which stated that the project "has been hit by alleged sabotage after the destruction and theft of traps that have also killed and injured household pets and other animals" but added that the £6 million programme was supported by most islanders. Another news item stated that some of the traps had "caught and killed family pets as well as hundreds of other animals". A subsequent report confirmed that "Police Scotland is investigating a number of incidents involving damage to and the theft of stoat traps in Orkney".

By 2024 the Orkney Native Wildlife Project had spent £7.9m trapping more than 6,300 stoats. Progress was impacted by the COVID-19 pandemic restrictions which prevented trapping in the 2020 breeding season.

=== Protected areas ===
There are 13 Special Protection Areas and 6 Special Areas of Conservation in Orkney. One of Scotland's 40 national scenic areas, the Hoy and West Mainland National Scenic Area, is also located in the islands. The seas to the northwest of Orkney are important for sand eels that provides a food source for many species of fish, seabirds, seals, whales and dolphins, and are now protected as Nature Conservation Marine Protected Area (NCMPA) that covers 4,365 km^{2} (1,685 sq mi).

== Flag ==
A new flag for Orkney was adopted in 2007 following a public competition. It comprises a Nordic cross of blue and yellow on a red background. Previously the traditional flag of St Magnus (a red cross on a yellow background) had sometimes been used, but in 2001 it was ruled too similar to other flags to allow it to be formally registered as the area's flag.

== Freedom of Orkney ==
The Freedom of Orkney is a ceremonial award issued by Orkney Islands Council. It can only be awarded twice during the term of any given Council, typically a period of five years. Its roots stretch back to the mid-15th century.

Recipients include:

- Ernest Marwick (1975)
- John Rae (2017)
- HMS Orkney (1984)
- Lord and Lady Grimond (1987)
- Queen's Own Highlanders (1990)
- The Northern Diving Group of the Royal Navy(2021).

== See also ==
- Timeline of prehistoric Scotland
- Prehistoric Scotland
- Battle of Florvåg
- List of places in Orkney
- Orkney Club
- Orkney College
- Rögnvald Kali Kolsson
- Udal Law
- Orkney Islands Church of Scotland
- Parishes of Orkney
- Constitutional status of Orkney, Shetland and the Western Isles
- Solar eclipse of 1 May 1185
- Baha'i Faith in Orkney
