= Hoy and West Mainland National Scenic Area =

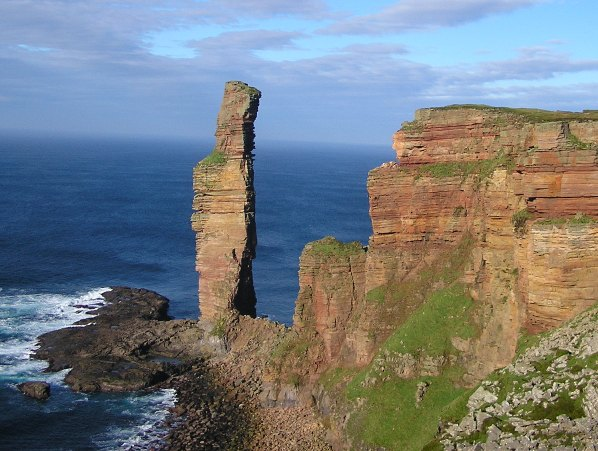
- The Old Man of Hoy, at the western side of Hoy, seen from the south.

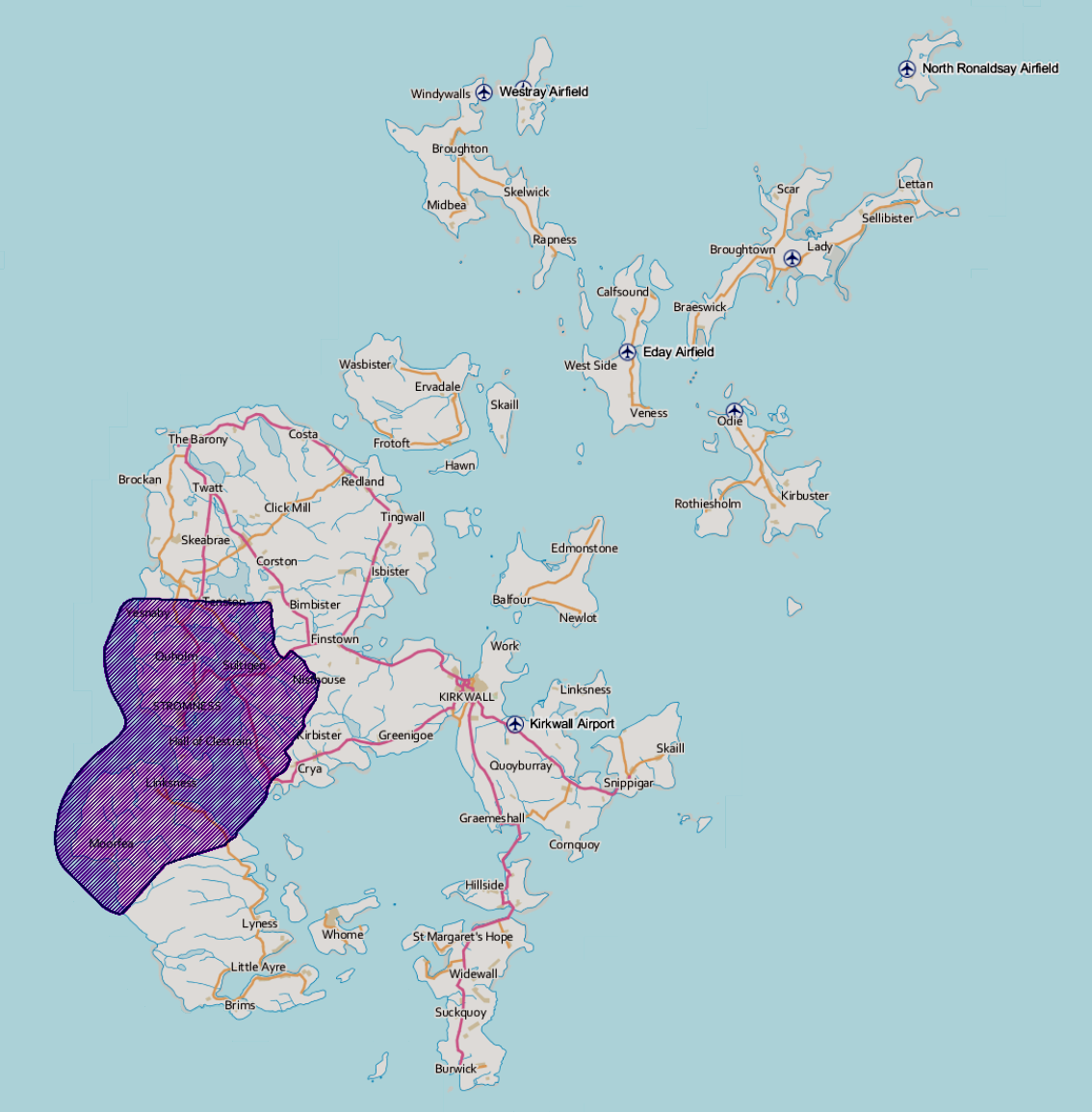
- Location: Orkney, Scotland
- Coordinates: 58°56′N 3°12′W
- Area: 244 km^{2} (94 sq mi)
- Established: 1981
- Governing body: NatureScot

Hoy and West Mainland is a national scenic area (NSA) covering parts of the islands of Hoy and Mainland in the Orkney Islands of Scotland, as well as parts of the surrounding sea. It is one of 40 such areas in Scotland, which are defined so as to identify areas of exceptional scenery and to ensure its protection by restricting certain forms of development. The Hoy and West Mainland NSA covers 24,407 ha in total, consisting of 16,479 ha of land with a further 7928 ha being marine (i.e. below low tide).

National scenic areas are primarily designated due to the scenic qualities of an area, however NSAs may well have other special qualities, for example related to culture, history, archaeology, geology or wildlife. Areas with such qualities may be protected via other national and international designations that overlap with the NSA designation. Hoy and West Mainland includes one of the six World Heritage Sites in Scotland, and there are several Special Areas of Conservation and Special Protection Areas within the NSA.

== Creation of the national scenic area ==
Following the Second World War, a committee, chaired by Sir Douglas Ramsay, was established to consider preservation of the landscape in Scotland. The report, published in 1945 proposed that five areas (Loch Lomond and the Trossachs, the Cairngorms, Glen Coe-Ben Nevis-Black Mount, Wester Ross and Glen Strathfarrar-Glen Affric-Glen Cannich) should receive a level of protection. Accordingly, the government designated these areas as "national park direction areas", giving powers for planning decisions taken by local authorities to be reviewed by central government. Following a further review of landscape protection in 1978, additional areas, including the northern part of the island of Hoy and the western part of the Orkney mainland, were identified as worthy of protection due to their landscape qualities. Accordingly, in 1981 the direction areas were replaced by the national scenic area designation, which were based on the 1978 recommendations and thus included the area entitled Hoy and West Mainland. The defined area remains as originally mapped in 1978, but was redesignated under new legislation in 2010.

Although the national scenic area designation provides a degree of additional protection via the planning process, there are no bodies equivalent to a national park authority, and whilst local authorities (in this case Orkney Islands Council) can produce a management strategy for each one, only the three national scenic areas within Dumfries and Galloway have current management strategies.

== Landscape and scenery ==
Main articles: Hoy, Mainland, Orkney and Heart of Neolithic Orkney

The bold, rounded hills of North Hoy are a dominant feature across the area, and contrast with the pastoral landscape of West Mainland. Human activity has played an important part in producing the current landscape, with the Neolithic monuments of the Heart of Neolithic Orkney sitting at the heart of the scattered farm steadings and stone dykes surrounding the Loch of Stenness.

The dramatic coastline of Hoy greets visitors travelling to Orkney by ferry from the Scottish mainland. It has extremes of many kinds: some of the highest sea cliffs in the UK at St John's Head, which reach 350 m; a light-stone precarious sea stack taller than the facing cliff – the Old Man of Hoy; patches of northernmost scattered, hardy woodland and the remote possibility of locally extant Orkney charr (Salvelinus inframundus) documented in 1908 at Heldale Water. The most northerly Martello Towers stand here built to defend the south entrance to Scapa Flow at Longhope in 1814 towards the end of the Napoleonic War, never used in combat. The highest point in the archipelago, Ward Hill, is on Hoy.

West Mainland by contrast presents a softer landscape, described by SNH as "a palimpsest of geology, topography, archaeology and land use". The area shows evidence of having been settled and farmed for many thousands of years. The view of the town of Stromness, and its link with the sea were also identified as "special qualities" of the area by Scottish Natural Heritage.

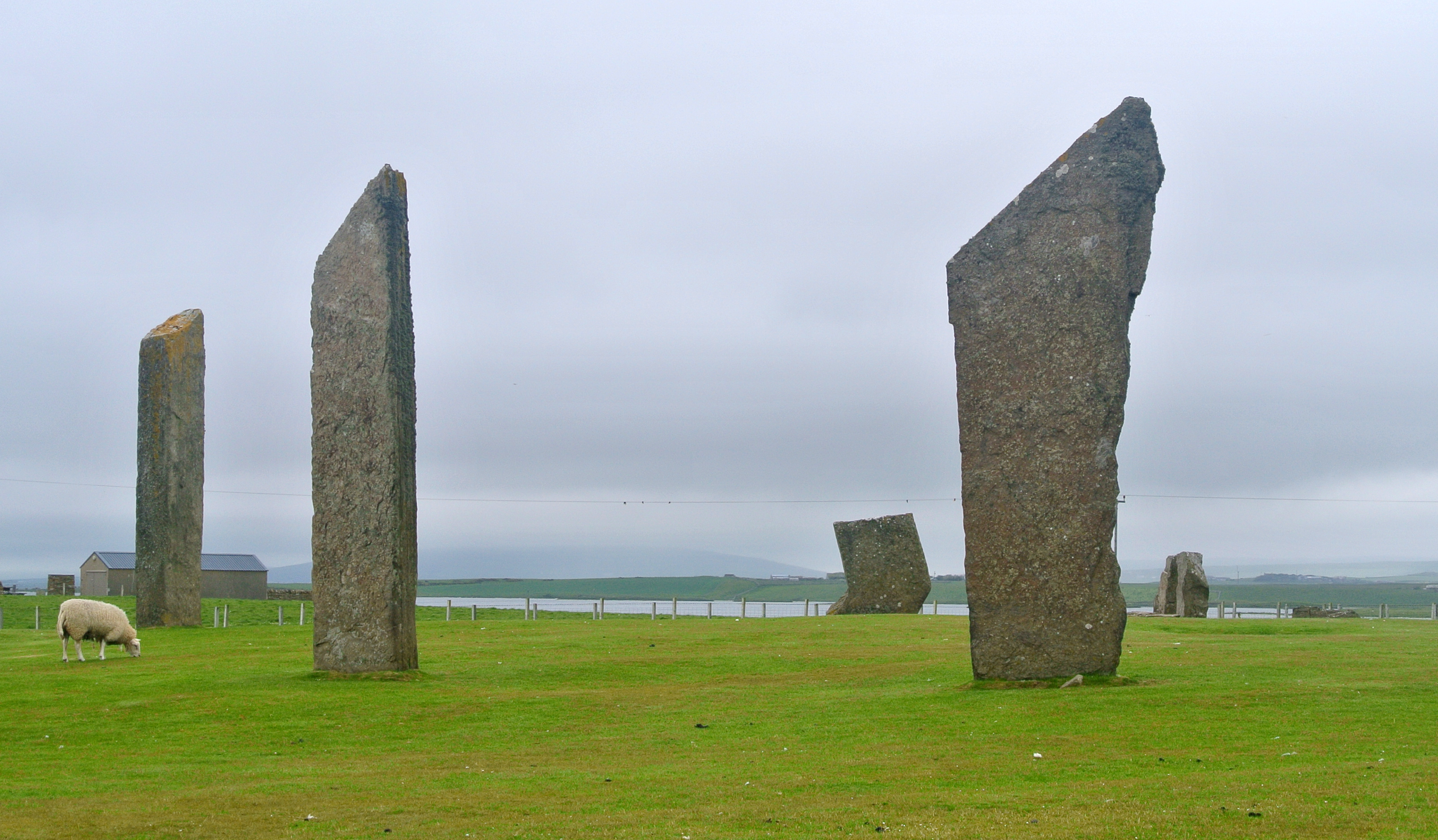
The Standing Stones of Stenness.

The national scenic area includes the Heart of Neolithic Orkney, a group of Neolithic monuments found in the West Mainland portion of the area. The name was adopted by UNESCO when it proclaimed these sites as a World Heritage Site in 1999. The site of patrimony currently consists of four sites:

1. Maeshowe – a unique chambered cairn and passage grave, aligned so that its central chamber is illuminated on the winter solstice. It was looted by Vikings who left one of the largest collections of runic inscriptions in the world.
2. Standing Stones of Stenness – the four remaining megaliths of a henge, the largest of which is 6 metres (19 ft) high.
3. Ring of Brodgar – a stone circle 104 metres in diameter, originally composed of 60 stones set within a circular ditch up to 3 metres deep and 10 metres wide, forming a henge monument. It has been estimated that the structure took 80,000 man-hours to construct.
4. Skara Brae – a cluster of eight houses making up Northern Europe’s best-preserved Neolithic village.

There are also Neolithic remains on Hoy, the most prominent of which is a megalithic chambered tomb carved out of a titanic block of Devonian Old Red Sandstone, and known as the Dwarfie Stane, which lies in the Rackwick valley on the edge of the national scenic area. It is the only chambered tomb in Orkney that is cut from stone rather than built from stones and may be the only example of a Neolithic rock-cut tomb in Britain.

== Conservations designations ==
There are three Special Areas of Conservation (SAC) within the NSA:

- The entire Hoy portion of the NSA is designated as an SAC, primarily for its upland and coastal habitats.
- 638 ha of heath and coast to the northwest of Stromness is designated as an SAC due to its fens, heaths and vegetated sea cliffs.
- The Loch of Stenness is designated as an SAC due to its marine species (including marine mammals).

The Hoy portion of the NSA, along with much of the adjoining sea area, is designated as a Special Protection Area due to its importance for nine breeding bird species: arctic skua, fulmar, great black-backed gull, great skua, guillemot, black-legged kittiwake, peregrine falcon, puffin and red-throated diver. The area is important for it seabird assemblage, which regularly supports 120,000 individual seabirds during the breeding season.
