= Baha'i Faith in Orkney =

Cluster of islands

Orkney is a cluster of islands lying roughly sixteen kilometres north of the north coast of Scotland. The Baháʼí faith first arrived in the main town, Kirkwall in 1953, having been established on the Scottish mainland about a decade earlier.

== History ==
In September 1953 English Bahá’i Charles Dunning arrived in Kirkwall, inspired by the Guardian of the Bahá’i Faith, Shoghi Effendi, who encouraged believers to settle in unopened territories during the Ten Year Crusade. As the first Bahá’i to open the Orkney Islands to the Bahá’i Faith during the Ten Year Crusade he was appointed as a Knight of Bahá’u’lláh by the Guardian.

Charles Dunning was 68 years of age when he arrived in Kirkwall, and over the following four years he supported himself as a travelling salesman, attending churches and meetings and making friends where possible, despite being regarded with suspicion by many people in the local community. Eventually poor health required him to leave the island, and in February 1958 his place was taken by Daryoush Mehrabi, who travelled the 500 miles from Nottingham to Aberdeen by motorbike before catching the overnight ferry to Orkney.

In February 1960 Daryoush married Jacqueline Thomas, a Bahá’i pioneer who was living in Aberdeen at the time. Together they settled in Kirkwall, starting a family and beginning to establish a Bahá’i community, until at Ridván 1969, they were able to form the first Local Spiritual Assembly of Kirkwall.

== The Bahá’í Centre in Orkney ==
In 1976 The Universal House of Justice sent a letter to the National Spiritual Assembly of the United Kingdom, with instructions to either purchase or rent modest buildings in Orkney, Shetland and the Western Isles, with a view to establishing Bahá’i centres.

The Bahá’í Centre on Orkney is situated on Old Scapa Road, in Kirkwall. The building had previously belonged to an Orcadian homeopathic doctor, Dr Foubister, who had a practice in Wimpole Street, London, was Consultant Paediatrician at the Royal London Homeopathic Hospital, and had attended the Guardian in London during his final illness in 1957. When his house in Kirkwall came up for sale in 1979 it was bought by a Bahá’í living in Spain with the intention of moving to Orkney. Realising that the Bahá’ís were looking for a suitable property, she sold the house to them at a reasonable price.

The Bahá’í Centre is a focal point in Kirkwall both for meetings and activities run by the Bahá'í community, and for other groups with similar values and interests.
