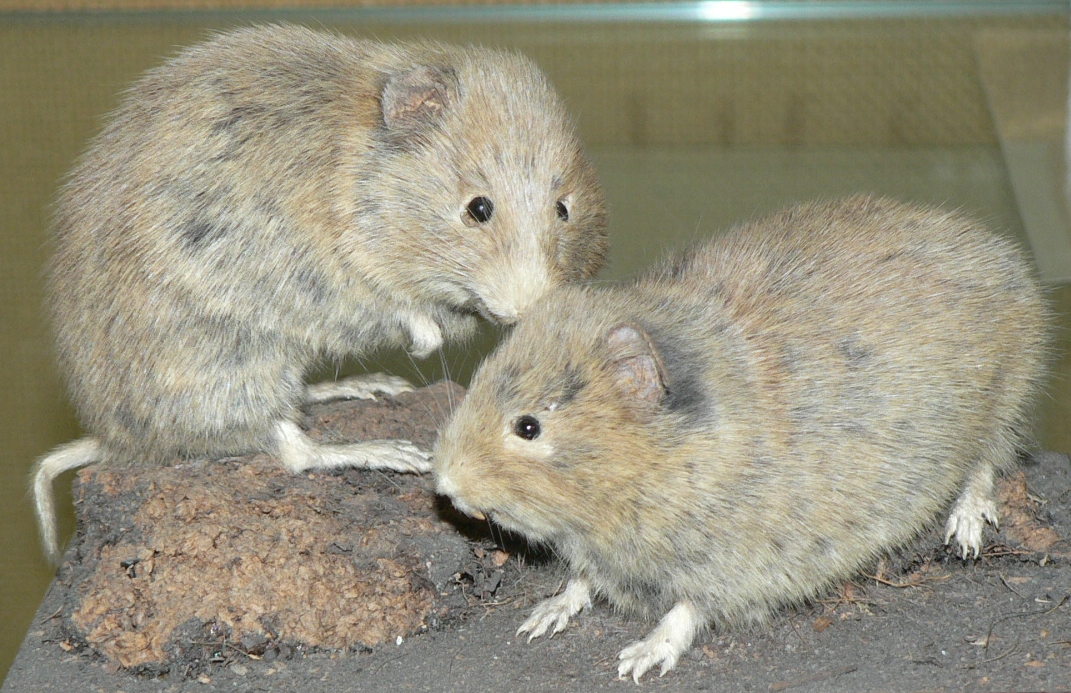
- In the Natural History Museum at Tring

Conservation status
- Vulnerable (IUCN 3.1)

Scientific classification
- Kingdom: Animalia
- Phylum: Chordata
- Class: Mammalia
- Order: Rodentia
- Family: Cricetidae
- Subfamily: Arvicolinae
- Genus: Microtus
- Species: M. arvalis
- Subspecies: M. a. orcadensis

Trinomial name
- Microtus arvalis orcadensis Millais, 1904

Synonyms
- Microtus orcadensis Microtus ronaldshaiensis Microtus rousiensis Microtus sandayensis Microtus westrae

= Orkney vole =

Subspecies of rodent

The Orkney vole (Microtus arvalis orcadensis) is a population of the common vole found in the Orkney Islands, off the northern coast of Scotland. The common vole is absent from the rest of the British Isles.

== Distribution and habitat ==
The Orkney vole occurs on nine islands of the group: the Mainland, Sanday, Westray, Rousay, South Ronaldsay, Burray, Eday, Shapinsay, and Stronsay.

== Taxonomy ==
In the past the populations on each of these islands have been named as subspecies, and the Orkney vole as a whole is considered by some taxonomists to be a subspecies of the common vole because of its size difference from the common vole. However, others do not recognise any subspecies of the common vole, especially since DNA analysis indicates transport by Neolithic humans from what is now Belgium. Chromosome studies have shown however, that despite being twice as heavy as continental voles, they are conspecific and should be regarded as a subspecies.

== Origin ==
M. arvalis does not occur in mainland Britain, nor elsewhere in the British Isles. However, it does appear on the European continent. The current leading hypothesis for the development of this disjunct population is that voles were introduced to the Orkney archipelago by humans in Neolithic times, possibly concealed in animal fodder, from trade with the continent. The oldest known radiocarbon-dated fossil of the species in Orkney is 4,600 years old: this marks the latest possible date of introduction.

It was once hypothesized that the Orkney voles were a relict population, left behind when the land-bridge connecting Scotland and Orkney had disappeared, by the date that the more competitive M. agrestis had reached Northern Scotland, though this theory has since been rejected based on paleontological, ecological, biological and geological evidence.
