= Orkney Club =

The Orkney Club
- Formation: 1826
- Location: Kirkwall, Orkney
- Members: 250 men and women
- Website: www.theorkneyclub.co.uk

The Orkney Club is situated in Kirkwall, Orkney. It was founded in 1826 as a gentlemen's club, ladies first being admitted as members in 1994. Membership of the club is by nomination and election.

== Location ==
Before 1892, the Orkney Club members met in a room in the St. Ola Hotel on Kirkwall harbour front. The hotel was owned by Mrs Mary Geddes, whose late husband had been a chemist in the town. The hotel had a bar and billiard room. Bar business was so good that she did not need to run the premises as a hotel and in 1892 decided to have the present Orkney Club building erected (just two doors away from the hotel) for the use of the members and for her own residence. In 1910, the Orkney Club members bought the premises from Mrs Geddes and meets there to this day.

== Membership ==
To join the Orkney Club, a candidate must be elected, after signing an application form, and being nominated by an existing member of the club, and seconded by another member. All applicants to the Orkney Club must be at least 21 years of age.
