= Salvelinus inframundus =

Conservation status
- Extinct (IUCN 3.1)

Scientific classification
- Kingdom: Animalia
- Phylum: Chordata
- Class: Actinopterygii
- Division: Teleostei
- Order: Salmoniformes
- Family: Salmonidae
- Genus: Salvelinus
- Species: †S. inframundus

Binomial name
- †Salvelinus inframundus Regan, 1909

Species of fish

Salvelinus inframundus, also known as Orkney charr, is an extinct cold-water fish in the family Salmonidae which was endemic to Hoy Island, Orkney, Scotland.

== Description ==
Salvelinus inframundus has the following characteristics which in combination make this taxon different from other "Arctic charr" in Great Britain. It has a relatively shallow body which is less than a fifth of its body length, it has an inferiorly positioned mouth, the pectoral fins are 67–88% the length of its head and there are 8–9 10 soft rays in the dorsal fin with 8–9 soft rays in the anal fin. It has moderately large teeth, 9–11 branchiostegals, 13–14 gill rakers, 188–200 lateral scales and 63–64 vertebrae. Other distinguishing features cited include a blunt snout; steel-grey colour on the sides with a white to pinkish or bright orange belly; there are numerous whitish spots along the flanks, mostly on the upper half of body. The pectoral and anal fins are orange-brown to orange-red while the pelvic fins can be cherry-red, and all have a white leading edge.

== Distribution ==
This species is known only from specimens fished in Heldale Water, Hoy Island, Orkney, Scotland. It has not been recorded since 1908, so in 2024 it was listed as extinct in the IUCN Red List. This has been suggested to be due to engineering works in the late 19th century which disrupted the species ability to spawn, and competition with non-native Brown trout introduced during the early 20th century. However, the same or a very similar fish has been observed in Loch Mealt, on the Isle of Skye.

== Taxonomy ==
Salevlinus inframundus was first formally described by the English ichthyologist Charles Tate Regan (1878–1943) in 1909 with the type locality given as Hellyal Lake, the former name of Heldale Water on the Isle of Hoy in Orkney. The specific name of this species is a compound of infra meaning "below" and mundus meaning "world", i.e. "underworld", and is a reference to Hellyal which is derived from the Norse goddess of the underworld Hel. There is some controversy over the exact taxonomic status of the populations of charr which are found in lakes all over Europe and which show disjunct distributions and wide phenotypic variations. Some authorities take the view that there is a single species in Europe and that almost all populations fall within the subspecies Salvelinus alpinus alpinus and that the variations are due to non taxonomic adaptation to the local conditions. Other workers have accepted each population as a species, 15 of which have been recognised in Britain and Ireland.
