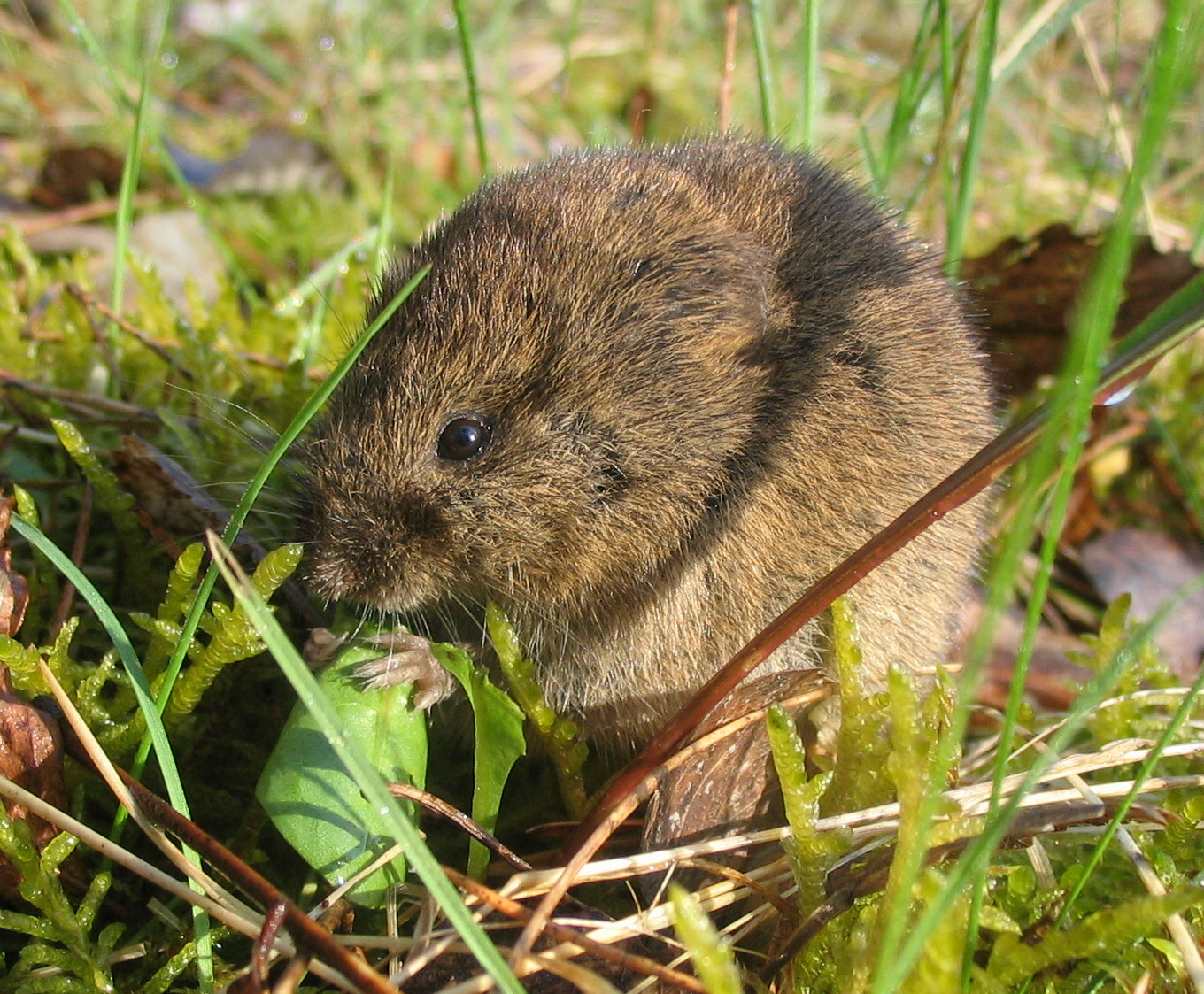

Conservation status
- Least Concern (IUCN 3.1)

Scientific classification
- Kingdom: Animalia
- Phylum: Chordata
- Class: Mammalia
- Infraclass: Placentalia
- Order: Rodentia
- Family: Cricetidae
- Subfamily: Arvicolinae
- Genus: Microtus
- Subgenus: Microtus
- Species: M. arvalis

Binomial name
- Microtus arvalis (Pallas, 1778)
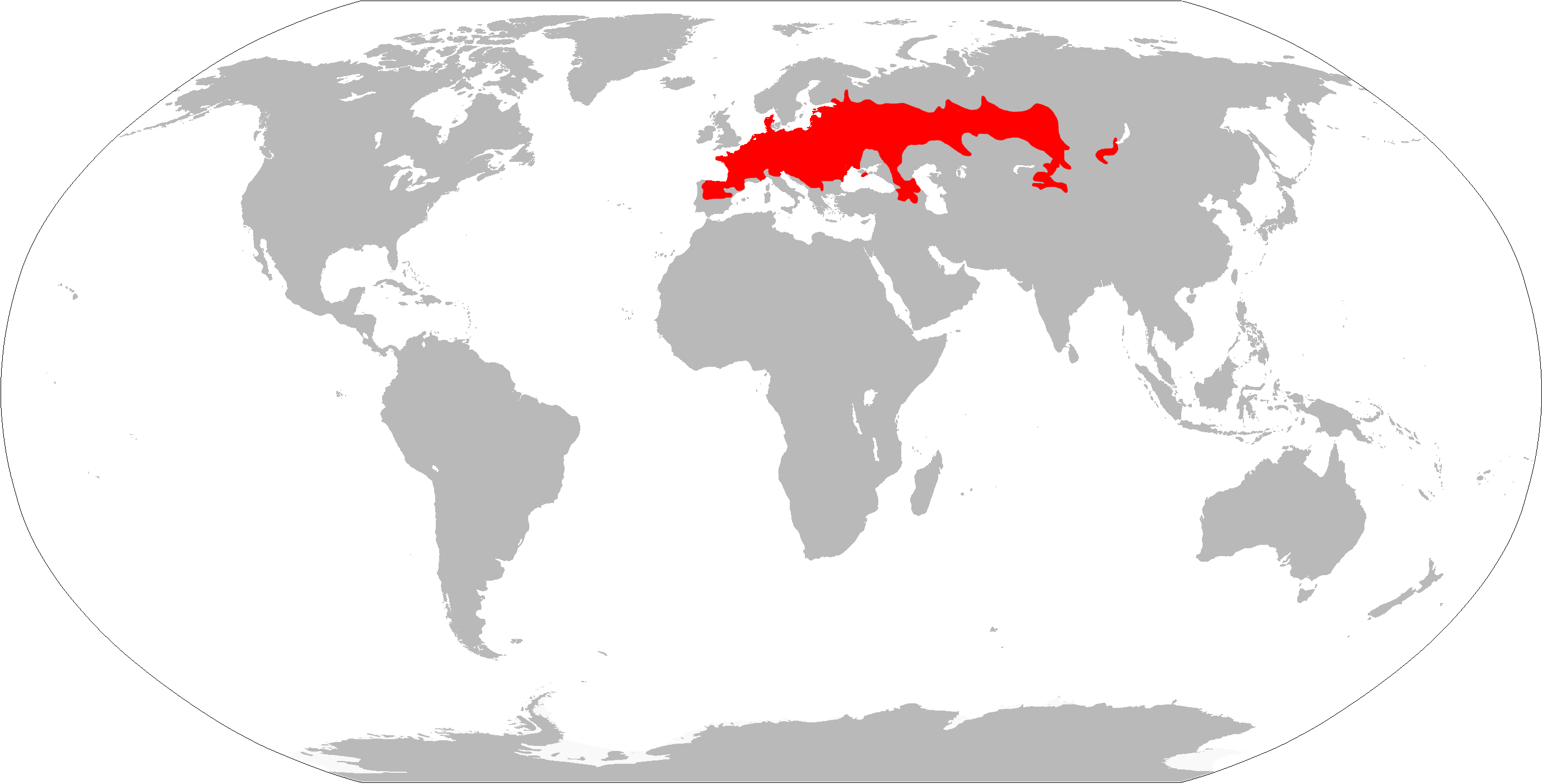
- Common vole distribution

Synonyms
- Microtus obscurus (Eversmann, 1841)

= Common vole =

Species of rodent

The common vole (Microtus arvalis) is a European rodent.

== Distribution and habitat ==
The common vole is hardly restricted in means of distribution and habitat and inhabits large areas of Eurasia. However, apart from the Orkney vole, in Ireland and Britain it is replaced by the related field vole, M. agrestis. As M. arvalis followed human civilization, primary and secondary habitats can be distinguished.

The primary habitats are everything but dense forests, such as meadows, heath lands, and fallow land. The secondary habitats are mainly agricultural fields, where shallow-sloped areas are preferred. The natural food of the common vole is grass, but it also feeds on many agricultural crops (within secondary habitats) and here its reproduction is faster than in primary habitats.

== Reproduction, demography, and predation ==
After pregnancy of 16 to 24 days, females give birth to 3 to 8 juveniles, weighing between 1.0 and 3.1 g. Weaning is around the 20th day. Female juveniles can be impregnated from the 13th day after birth. Hence, first birth can be given from the 33rd day. During annual reproduction, which starts in March and ends in October, females usually have three reproductive cycles.

The average life span is 4.5 months, which means that most animals die after the last reproduction in October, while the latest offspring in the year survives the winter and starts reproduction the following spring. Weights can reach 51 g in males and 42 g in non-pregnant females. Sex ratio at birth is equal, but becomes female-biased as the animals mature or with increasing population density when the ratio can level off to 3:1 or even 4:1 in favour of females. These ratios depict an intense competition for female mates, which leads to higher mortality and dispersal rates among the males.

Population density varies seasonally and exhibits a considerable long-term fluctuation that shows typically three-year or five-year cycles. Densities can range from 100 individuals per ha (very low level) to over 500 individuals per ha (medium level) up to 2000 individuals per ha in some years. As reaction females' reproduction can decrease or even stop. Not only influenced by population level, reproduction rate can change with the amount and quality of food and light. Self-regulation (e.g. decrease of reproduction rate) has been addressed to be a response to increased population densities. However, M. arvalis is one of the main food sources of a considerable number of predators in Central Europe. Buzzard, kestrel, long-eared owl, tawny owl, and barn owl are some of the birds that feed on the common vole and so delimit population sizes. Ground-predators are mainly weasel, stoat, adder, polecat, fox and boar.

== Territories and nests ==
Microtus arvalis maintains aboveground runways, which expand like a railway-system through the entire home range. Voles are seldom seen outside these runways, which enable faster and safer locomotion and easier orientation. The climbing ability of the common vole is very poor.

Underground nests are dug 30–40 cm (12–16 in) deep into the ground and are used for food storage, offspring raising, and as a place for rest and sleep. Nests can be shared and defended by up to five females with juveniles that are related in most cases. Females are territorial and an overlap of occupied areas does not occur. Hence, the number of colonies increases with individual number (i.e. population density).

As common voles have a polygynous mating system the males do not maintain territories and move as so-called "floaters" between several females' territories in order to mate as often as possible. They can show overlap in territories. These findings are supported by the different home range sizes of males (1200–1500 m^{2}) and females (300–400 m^{2}) that can decrease in both males and females as population density rises. Another response to population growth is to leave the original habitat and move towards another one. Males predominantly conduct dispersal, being most often caused by the competition for mates.

== See also ==
- Orkney vole
- 2007 vole plague in Castile and León
