= Coat of arms of Orkney =

- Adopted: 3 March 1975
- Crest: Islands area coronet
- Shield: Per pale azure and gules; dexter; a dragon galley or, sails furled argent, sinister, a lion rampant, imperially crowned, or, holding in the forepaws a battle axe erect in pale or
- Supporters: Dexter, a udaller habited of the fifteenth century, and, sinister, a unicorn argent, armed, maned and unguled or, and gorged of a collar gules, pendent therefrom an oval badge azure, fimbriated or, charged with a saltire argent
- Motto: Latin: Boreas domus mare amicus (roughly, "The North home, friend of the sea")

The coat of arms of Orkney was adopted on 3 March 1975 and is among the oldest of those of the Scottish Council Areas, as the Orkney Islands Council was unaffected by the 1996 local government reform. With the exception of the islands area coronet and a different sinister supporter the current coat of arms is also identical to that of the pre-1975 Orkney County Council.

Coat of arms of Norway

The shield depicts the Clan Sinclair ship and the Norwegian lion. This reflects the history of Orkney. Before Norwegian occupation the aboriginal inhabitants or Picts (one of the founding nations of Scotland) settled on the island thousands of years before a Norse invasion and the island was under Norway for several centuries. The island was pawned as dowry security in 1468, to the kingdom of Scotland, where members of the Sinclair family held the Earldom of Orkney for almost a century in the Late Middle Ages in fealty to the monarchs of Norway.

== See also ==
- Coat of arms of Norway
- History of Orkney

== Sources and external links ==
- The Heraldry Society of Scotland: Orkney
