= Ward Hill, Hoy =

Hill on the island of Hoy, Orkney, Scotland

Coordinates: 58.90017°N 3.33986°W

Ward Hill
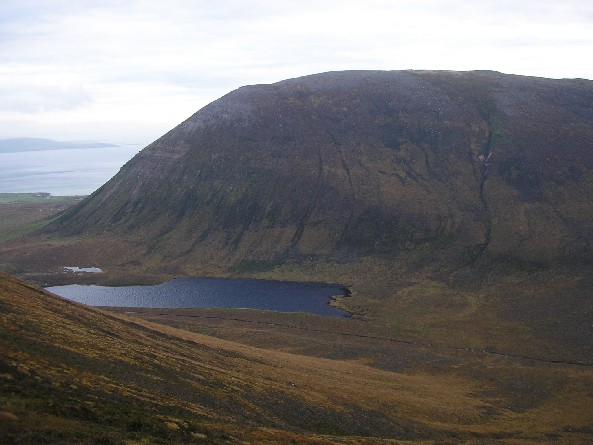
- Ward Hill, seen from Cuilags to the north, with Sandy Loch intervening

Highest point
- Elevation: 481 m (1,578 ft)
- Prominence: 481 m (1,578 ft)
- Listing: Marilyn, Council top (Orkney), County top (Orkney)

Geography
- Location within Orkney Islands
- Location: Hoy, Orkney, Scotland
- OS grid: HY229022
- Topo map: OS Landrangers 6, 7

Ward Hill is a hill on the island of Hoy in Orkney, Scotland. It lies at the north of the island between Moaness and Rackwick, and is the highest point in both Orkney and the Scottish Northern Isles at an elevation of 481 m (1,578 ft).

The hill forms a curved ridge, reminiscent of a 'J' in shape. The lower slopes are covered in heather and grass, though the top of the ridge is covered in small stones with bare sandy soil. The highest summit is towards the northern end and is crowned by a trig point. The ridge is well separated from the other hills of Hoy, and both the other Marilyns on the island have high topographic prominence. Ward Hill is separated from Cuilags by the Glens of Kinnaird, and from Knap of Trowieglen by the glen carrying the road between Moaness and Rackwick, in which lies the Dwarfie Stane.

The existence of Anastrepta orcadensis (also known as Orkney Notchwort), a liverwort found in the United States, Canada, and widely in Europe, was first discovered on Ward Hill by William Jackson Hooker in 1808.
