= Holm (island) =

There are numerous islands containing the word holm, mainly in northern Europe. In many cases the name is derived from the Old Norse holmr, meaning "a small and rounded islet". These include:

== Denmark ==
- Bornholm
- Hørsholm
- Munkholm
- Slotsholmen

== Germany ==
- Dänholm
- Holm in Flensburg
- Holm in Schleswig

== Greenland ==
- Holm Ø

== Ireland ==
- Holmpatrick (the original name for the town of Skerries, County Dublin, and one of its islands

== Sweden ==
- Stockholm (originally the islet Helgeandsholmen in central Stockholm)
- Djursholm (suburb of Stockholm)
- Tureholm
- There are hundreds of islets in the Stockholm archipelago containing the word "holm"

== United Kingdom ==
=== England ===
- Holm Island in the River Thames
- Steep Holm in the Bristol Channel
- Portholme in the River Great Ouse
- Holme-next-the-Sea in Norfolk

=== Northern Ireland ===
- Ballynahinch, County Down (from Irish Baile na hInse 'town of the holm')

=== Orkney, Scotland ===
- Glimps Holm
- Helliar Holm
- Holm of Papa
- Lamb Holm
- Linga Holm
- Muckle Green Holm
- In the vicinity of Copinsay:
  - Black Holm
  - Corn Holm
- In the vicinity of Eday:
  - Rusk Holm
- In the vicinity of Egilsay:
  - Holm of Scockness
  - Kili Holm
- In the vicinity of Gairsay:
  - Grass Holm, Orkney
  - Sweyn Holm
- In the vicinity of Orkney Mainland:
  - Holm of Houton
  - Holm of Rendall
  - Thieves Holm
- In the vicinity of Shapinsay:
  - Helliar Holm
- In the vicinity of Stronsay:
  - Holm of Huip
- In the vicinity of Westray:
  - Holm of Faray

=== Shetland, Scotland ===
- In the vicinity of Shetland Mainland:
  - Dore Holm
  - Horse Holm
  - Lady's Holm
  - Little Holm, Scatness
  - Burwick Holm
  - Holm of Culsetter
  - Fish Holm
  - Lunna Holm
  - North Holm of Barravoe
  - Setter Holm, Hamnavoe
  - South Holm of Burravoe
  - Wether Holm, Hamnavoe
- In the vicinity of East Burra:
  - Holm of Hous
- In the vicinity of Noss:
  - Holm of Noss.
- In the vicinity of Out Skerries:
  - Wether Holm, Out Skerries
- In the vicinity of Papa Stour:
  - Brei Holm
  - Forewick Holm
- In the vicinity of Unst:
  - Brough Holm
- In the vicinity of Uyea, Unst:
  - Wedder Holm, Uyea
- In the vicinity of West Linga:
  - Kettil Holm
  - Wether Holm, West Linga
- In the vicinity of Yell:
  - Holm of West Sandwick
  - Gloup Holm
  - Little Holm, Yell Sound
  - Muckle Holm, Yell Sound
  - Holm of Copister

=== Skye, Scotland ===
- East of the Trotternish peninsula:
  - Holm Island

=== South Georgia ===
- Grassholm, South Georgia

=== Wales ===
- Flat Holm in the Bristol Channel
- Burry Holms off the Gower Peninsula
- Grassholm west of Skomer
- Middleholm east of Skomer
- Skokholm south of Skomer
- Puffin Island, Anglesey, formerly known as Priestholm

== Variant forms ==
=== Faroe Islands ===
- Baglhólmur
- Gáshólmur
- Hovshólmur
- Hoyvíkshólmur
- Kirkjubøhólmur
- Lopranshólmur
- Mykineshólmur
- Sumbiarhólmur
- Tindhólmur
- Tjaldavíkshólmur
- Trøllhøvdi

=== Iceland ===
- Stykkishólmur

=== France, Normandy ===
- Engohomme in the 11th century, former island on the Seine River at Martot, Eure département
- Grand-Couronne, Seine-Maritime
- le Houlme, Seine-Maritime
- le Hom, Calvados
- Robehomme, Calvados
- Saint-Quentin-sur-le-Homme, Manche
- Île Meuromme, island on the Seine River, at Freneuse, Seine-Maritime
- Torhulmus 1030 ancient name of the Oissel island, Seine-Maritime
- les Échommes, hamlet at Saint-Senier-sous-Avranches (Eschehoume 1517)
- Suhomme, former hamlet at Varaville (Suhomme 1753 - 1785)

=== Insular Normandy ===
Bailiwick of Guernsey

- Off Guernsey
  - Les Houmets including - Houmet Benest/Benet, Houmet Paradis & Houmet Hommetol (Omptolle).
- Off Herm
  - Le Plat Houmet

Bailiwick of Jersey

- Le Plat Hommet
- Le Hommet du Ouaisné
- Les Hommets

== See also ==
- -hou, sometimes Norman version of the holmr, found commonly in the Channel Islands and on the Cotentin Peninsula
- Fore Holm (disambiguation)
- Grass Holm (disambiguation)
- Little Holm (disambiguation)
- Muckle Holm (disambiguation)
- Wether Holm (disambiguation)
- List of Orkney islands
- List of Shetland islands
