= List of Orkney islands =

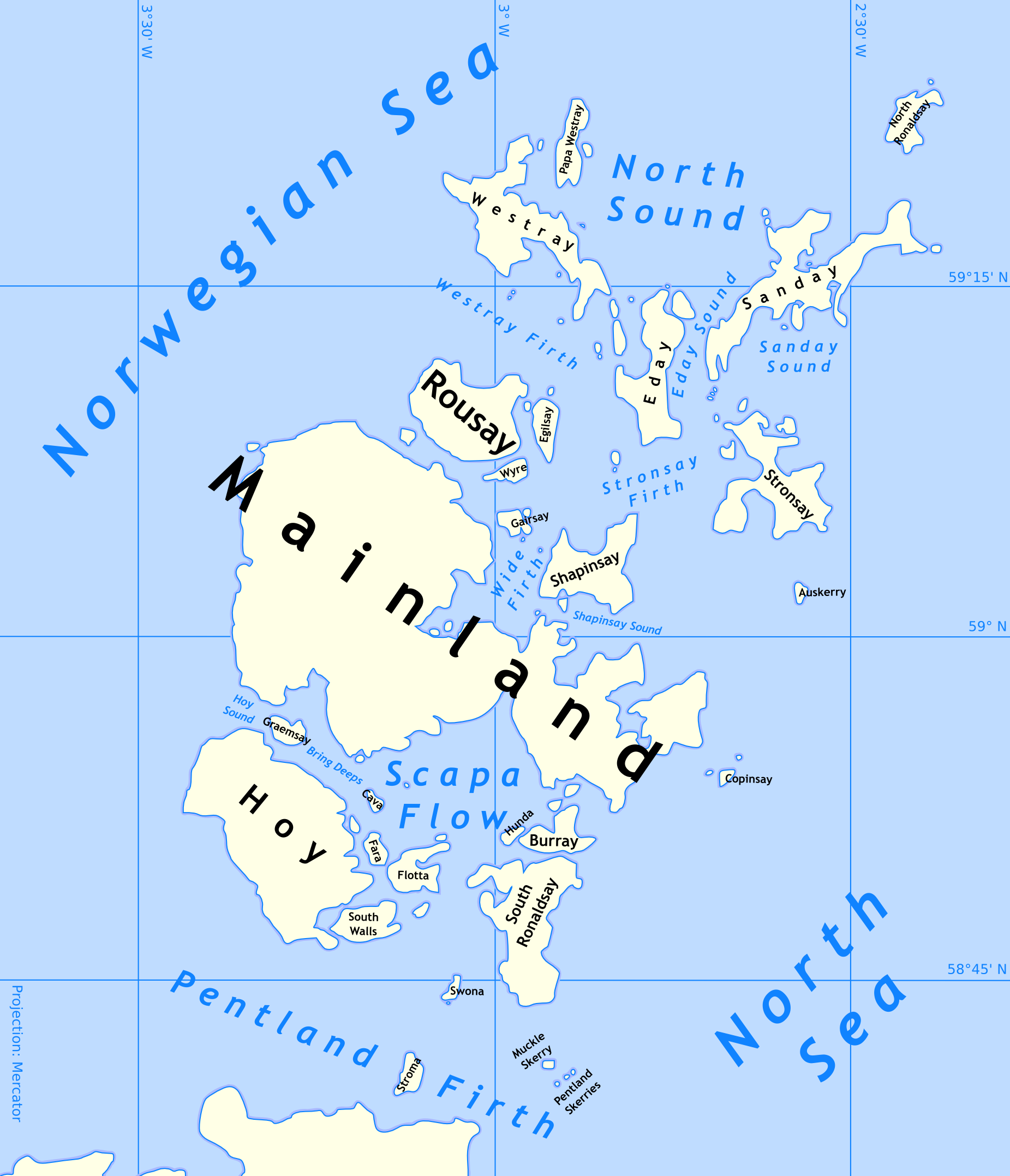
Map of Orkney with the larger islands labelled

Orkney, an archipelago located 16 kilometres (9.9 mi) north of mainland Scotland, comprises more than 70 islands and skerries, of which 20 are permanently inhabited. In addition to the Mainland, the largest island in Orkney, there are three groups of islands. The North and South Isles lie respectively north and south of the Mainland, and the Pentland Skerries are a group of small islands in the Pentland Firth, a dangerous stretch of water between mainland Scotland and the larger islands of Orkney, through which run the strongest tidal streams in Britain. The island of Stroma may be mistakenly included in Orkney, but is in fact part of Caithness.

The definition of an island used in this list is that it is "land that is surrounded by seawater on a daily basis, but not necessarily at all stages of the tide, excluding human devices such as bridges and causeways". Four islands are joined to the Mainland by a series of causeways known as the Churchill Barriers. They are South Ronaldsay, Burray, Lamb Holm and Glimps Holm. In addition, Hunda is connected to Burray by a causeway. The barriers were constructed by Italian prisoners of war as a means of preventing enemy submarine access to the vast natural harbour of Scapa Flow after the sinking of HMS Royal Oak by a German U-boat in 1939 with the loss of 883 lives. The Italian prisoners constructed a small Catholic chapel on Lamb Holm during their incarceration.

Most of the islands have a bedrock formed from Old Red Sandstone, which is about 400 million years old, and was laid down in the Devonian period. The islands have good agricultural qualities and have been continuously inhabited for thousands of years, as evidenced by the World Heritage Site of the Heart of Neolithic Orkney. The archipelago is exposed to wind and tide, and there are numerous lighthouses as navigation aids. The European Marine Energy Centre, which is located at Stromness, is currently testing various wave- and tidal-energy devices from Billia Croo on the Mainland and Eday. The islands all fall within the Orkney Islands Council area. Most of the larger islands have development trusts that support the local economy.

The total population of Orkney increased from 19,245 in 2001 to 21,349 at the time of the 2011 census and was 21,958 in 2022.

== Main list ==
This is a list of islands with an area greater than 15 hectares (approximately 37 acres) or which are inhabited. Records for the last date of settlement for the smaller uninhabited islands are incomplete, but all of the islands listed here would have been inhabited at some point during the Neolithic, Pictish or Norse periods.

'Ward Hill' or a variant thereof is very common as the name of the highest point on the island. These locations are named after those high places used for the lighting of warning beacons.

Islands with an area greater than 15 ha (37 acres)
| Island | Group | Area (ha) | Population | Last inhabited | Highest point | Height (m) |
|---|---|---|---|---|---|---|
| Auskerry | North Isles | 85 | 2 | | West Hill | 18 |
| Brough of Birsay | Mainland | 16 | 0 | unknown | Brough Head | 42 |
| Burray | South Isles | 903 | 445 | | | 80 |
| Calf of Eday | North Isles | 243 | 0 | unknown | | 54 |
| Calf of Flotta | South Isles | 16 | 0 | unknown | | 16 |
| Cava | South Isles | 107 | 0 | 1993 | | 38 |
| Copinsay | South Isles | 73 | 0 | 1970s | Broad Lee | 70 |
| Damsay | North Isles | 18 | 0 | unknown | | 11 |
| Eday | North Isles | 2,745 | 102 | | Ward Hill | 101 |
| Egilsay | North Isles | 650 | 17 | | | 35 |
| Eynhallow | North Isles | 75 | 0 | 1842–90 | | 30 |
| Fara | South Isles | 295 | 0 | 1960s | Thomson's Hill | 43 |
| Faray | North Isles | 180 | 0 | 1940s | | 32 |
| Flotta | South Isles | 876 | 77 | | West Hill | 58 |
| Gairsay | North Isles | 240 | 6 | | | 102 |
| Glimps Holm | South Isles | 55 | 0 | unknown | | 32 |
| Graemsay | South Isles | 409 | 21 | | West Hill | 62 |
| Helliar Holm | North Isles | 35 | 0 | 1967 | | 28 |
| Holm of Faray | North Isles | 27 | 0 | unknown | | 19 |
| Holm of Grimbister | North Isles | 16 | 2 | | | 8 |
| Holm of Huip | North Isles | 24 | 0 | unknown | | 18 |
| Holm of Papa | North Isles | 21 | 0 | unknown | | 15 |
| Holm of Scockness | North Isles | 22 | 0 | unknown | | 18 |
| Hoy | South Isles | 13,468 | 392 | | Ward Hill | 479 |
| Hunda | South Isles | 100 | 0 | unknown | | 41 |
| Lamb Holm | South Isles | 40 | See below | 1945 | | 20 |
| Linga Holm | North Isles | 57 | 0 | 1842–90 | | 18 |
| Muckle Green Holm | North Isles | 28 | 0 | unknown | | 28 |
| Muckle Skerry | Pentland Skerries | 34 | 0 | 1994 | | 20 |
| North Ronaldsay | North Isles | 690 | 59 | | | 23 |
| Orkney Mainland | Mainland | 52,325 | 17,779 | | Mid Hill | 271 |
| Papa Stronsay | North Isles | 74 | 9 | | | 13 |
| Papa Westray | North Isles | 918 | 95 | | North Hill | 48 |
| Rousay | North Isles | 4,860 | 236 | | Blotchnie Fiold | 250 |
| Rysa Little | South Isles | 33 | 0 | 19th century | | 20 |
| Sanday | North Isles | 5,043 | 491 | | The Wart | 65 |
| Shapinsay | North Isles | 2,948 | 299 | | Ward Hill | 64 |
| South Ronaldsay | South Isles | 4,980 | 984 | | Ward Hill | 118 |
| South Walls | South Isles | 1,100 | See Hoy | | Gallow Tuag | 57 |
| Start Point | North Isles | 24 | 0 | unknown | Mount Misery | 8 |
| Stronsay | North Isles | 3,275 | 321 | | Burgh Hill | 44 |
| Switha | South Isles | 41 | 0 | 20th century? | | 29 |
| Sweyn Holm | North Isles | 17 | 0 | unknown | | 15 |
| Swona | South Isles | 92 | 0 | 1974 | Warbister Hill | 41 |
| Westray | North Isles | 4,713 | 566 | | Fitty Hill | 169 |
| Wyre | North Isles | 311 | 8 | | | 32 |

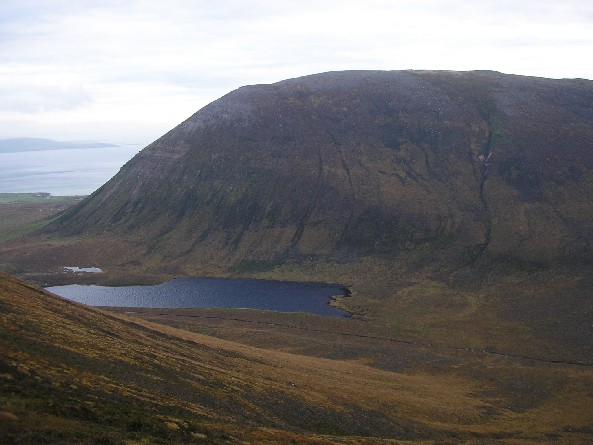
Ward Hill, Hoy

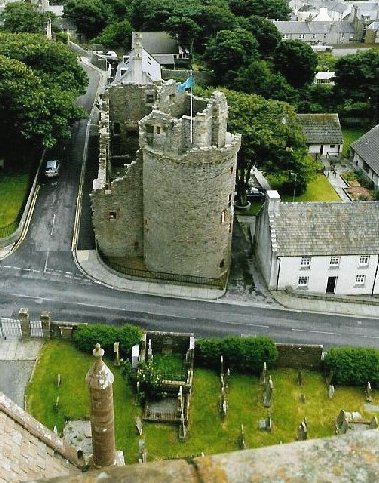
Bishop's Palace, Kirkwall, Mainland

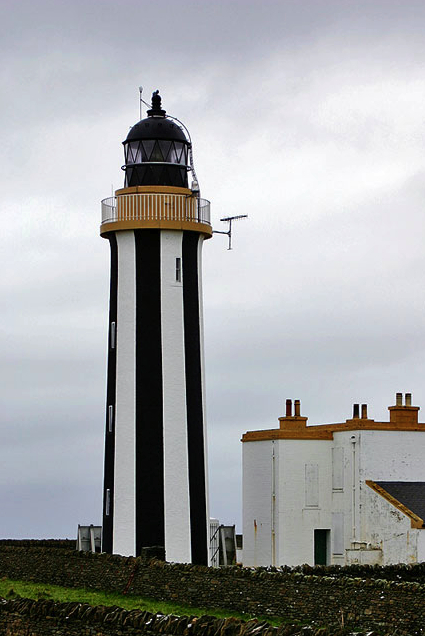
Start Point lighthouse, Sanday

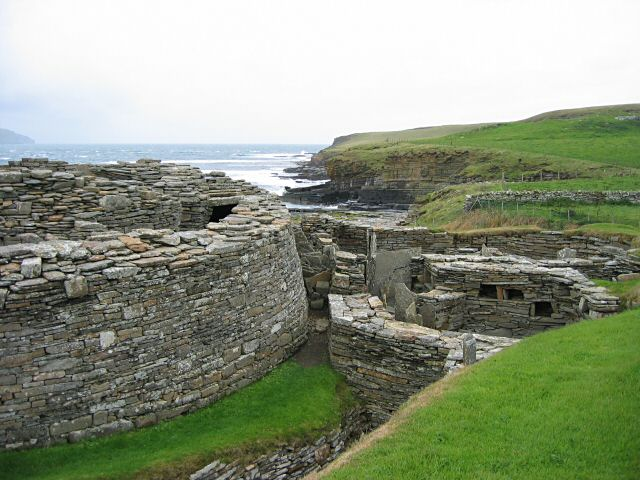
Midhowe Broch, Rousay

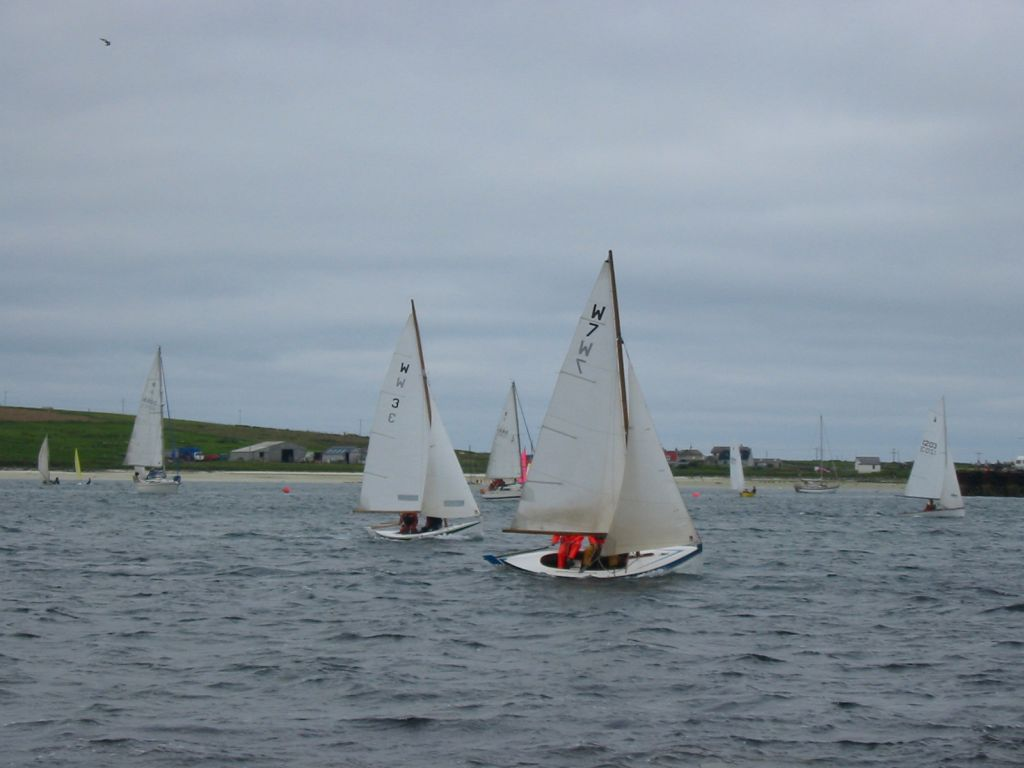
Westray Skiffs racing in the Bay of Pierowall

The population of the tidal islet of Holm of Grimbister was not recorded by the 2001 census, although it was inhabited in 2010 and probably earlier. It did appear in the 2011 tables and again in 2022.

The population of Inner Holm in 2011 was one but it was not recorded as inhabited in 2022.

Lamb Holm was "included in the NRS statistical geography for inhabited islands but had no usual residents at the time of either the 2001 or 2011 censuses".

Papa Stronsay had usually resident population of 10 in 2001 but was apparently not permanently inhabited in 2011.

== Smaller islets and skerries ==
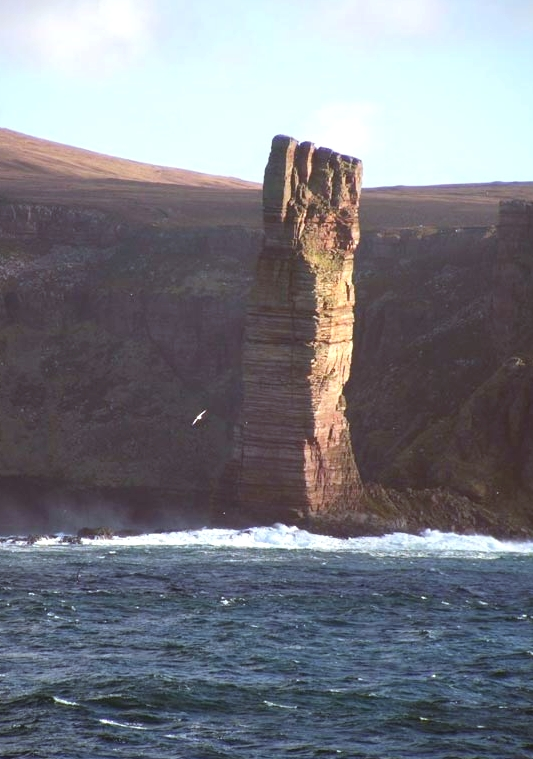
The Old Man of Hoy

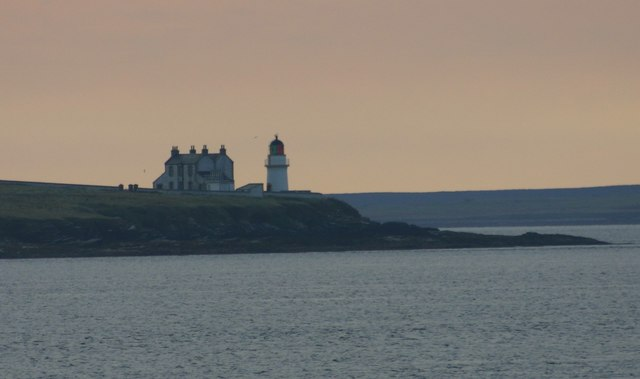
Saeva Ness Lighthouse, Helliar Holm

This is a continuing list of uninhabited smaller Orkney islands (many of which are called "Holm" from the Old Norse holmr, meaning a small and rounded islet), tidal islets only separated at higher stages of the tide, or skerries which are only exposed at lower stages of the tide.

In the vicinity of:

- Auskerry: Lunga Skerries, Oessen Skerry, The Clett.
- Calf of Eday: Lashy Skerries, The Bow.
- Cava: Barrel of Butter.
- Copinsay: Black Holm, Corn Holm, Horse of Copinsay, Scarf Skerry, Sow Skerry, Ward Holm.
- Eday: Green Holm, Red Holm, Rusk Holm.
- Egilsay: Kili Holm.
- Eynhallow: Sheep Skerry.
- Gairsay: Holm of Boray, Holm of Rendall, Little Seal Skerry, Skertours, Taing Skerry.
- Glimps Holm: Dulse Skerry, Glimpsholm Skerry.
- Graemsay: Middle Skerry, Skerry of Cletts, Sour Skerry, Sow Skerry.
- Hoy: Grassy Cletts, Inner Skerry, Middle Skerry, Old Man of Hoy, Outer Skerry, The Needle.
- Mainland: Bo Skerry, Bow Skerries, Braga, Brough of Bigging, Holm of Houton, Holm of Rendall, Iceland Skerry, Inner Holm, Kirk Rocks, Little Skerry, Mirkady Point, Nevi Skerry, Outer Holm, Oyster Skerries, Puldrite Skerry, Quanterness Skerry, Scare Gun, Seal Skerry, Skaill Skerries, Skerries of Clestrain, Skerries of Coubister, Skerries of Lakequoy, Skerry of Work, Skerry of Yinstay, Smoogro Skerry, Thieves Holm, Whyabatten, Yesnaby Castle.
- Muckle Skerry: Clettack Skerry, Little Skerry, Louther Skerry.
- North Ronaldsay: Altars of Linnay, Green Skerry, Hoe Skerries, Reefdyke, Seal Skerry.
- Papa Stronsay: Jack's Hole, Jack's Reef.
- Papa Westray: Cairn Head, Muckle Quoy.
- Rousay: Little Brig, Muckle Brig.
- Sanday: Baa Gruna, Inner Holm of Ire, Outer Holm of Ire, Tresness
- Shapinsay: Broad Shoal, Grass Holm, Skerry of Vasa.
- Stronsay: Holms of Spurness, Ingale Skerry, Little Linga, The Bow.
- Swona: Selki Skerry, South Clett, The Tails of the Tarff, West Wini Skerry.
- Westray: Holm of Aikerness, Shell Holm, Skea Skerries, Wart Holm.
- Wyre: Wyre Skerries.

The remote islets of Sule Skerry and Sule Stack, which lie 37 miles (60 km) west of the archipelago form part of Orkney for local government purposes.

== See also ==
- List of places in Orkney
- List of Shetland islands
- List of Outer Hebrides
- List of islands of Scotland
- List of the largest islands in the North Sea

== References and footnotes ==
General references

- Haswell-Smith, Hamish (2004). The Scottish Islands. Edinburgh: Canongate. ISBN 978-1-84195-454-7.
- General Register Office for Scotland (28 November 2003) Scotland's Census 2001 – Occasional Paper No 10: Statistics for Inhabited Islands. Retrieved 26 February 2012.
- National Records of Scotland (15 August 2013). "Appendix 2: Population and households on Scotland's Inhabited Islands" (PDF). Statistical Bulletin: 2011 Census: First Results on Population and Household Estimates for Scotland Release 1C (Part Two) (PDF) (Report). SG/2013/126.
- Omand, Donald (ed.) (2003) The Orkney Book. Edinburgh. Birlinn. ISBN 1-84158-254-9

Specific references and notes
