= Scottish island names =

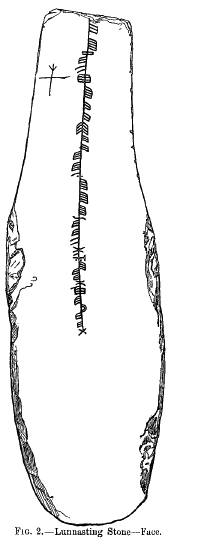
Undeciphered ogham inscription on the Lunnasting stone found near Vidlin, Shetland

The modern names of Scottish islands stem from two main influences. There are many names that derive from the Scottish Gaelic language in the Hebrides and Firth of Clyde. In the Northern Isles most place names have a Norse origin. There are also some island place names that originate from three other influences, including a limited number that are essentially English language names, a few that are of Brittonic origin and some of an unknown origin that may represent a pre-Celtic language. These islands have all been occupied by the speakers of at least three and in many cases four or more languages since the Iron Age, and many of the names of these islands have more than one possible meaning as a result. (Note: Writing in the 1880s, Rev. Thomas McLauchlan urged caution, noting that it "is necessary to ensure a historical, and hence an accurate instead of a fanciful, account of our topographical terms. Any one acquainted with Highland etymologies, knows to what an extent our imaginative countrymen have gone in attaching meanings altogether fanciful to such terms; but nothing is more likely to mislead the inquirer than elevating our ancient and irregular orthography to a position which it is altogether unfit to occupy".)

Scotland has over 790 offshore islands, most of which are to be found in four main groups: Shetland, Orkney, and the Hebrides, sub-divided into the Inner Hebrides and Outer Hebrides. There are also clusters of islands in the Firth of Clyde, Firth of Forth, and Solway Firth, and numerous small islands within the many bodies of fresh water in Scotland including Loch Lomond and Loch Maree.

The earliest written references to Scottish islands were made by authors in Classical antiquity. Many of the names for larger islands show some continuity although few of the names they identified for the smaller ones are cognate with the modern ones. Later writers such as Adomnán and the authors of the Irish annals also contributed to our understanding of these early toponyms.

== Main languages ==
=== Early languages ===
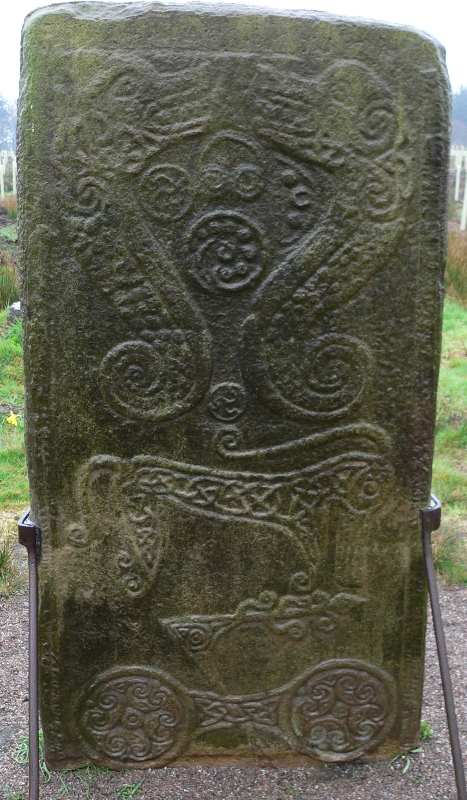
Rodney's stone

As humans have lived on the islands of Scotland since at least Mesolithic times, it is clear that pre-modern languages must have been used, and by extension names for the islands, that have been lost to history. Proto-Celtic is the presumed ancestor language of all the known Celtic languages. Proponents of the controversial Vasconic substratum theory suggest that many western European languages contain remnants of an even older language family of "Vasconic languages", of which Basque is the only surviving member. This proposal was originally made by the German linguist Theo Vennemann, but has been rejected by other linguists.

A small number of island names may contain elements of such an early Celtic or pre-Celtic language, but no certain knowledge of any pre-Pictish language exists anywhere in Scotland.

=== Celtic languages ===
British or Brythonic was an ancient P-Celtic language spoken in Britain. It is a form of Insular Celtic, which is descended from Proto-Celtic, the hypothetical parent language that many linguistics belief had already begun to diverge into separate dialects or languages in the first half of the first millennium BC. By the sixth century AD, scholars of early Insular history often begin to talk about four geographically separate forms of British: Welsh, Breton, Cornish, and the now extinct Cumbric language. These are collectively known as the Brythonic languages. It is clear that whenever place names are recorded at an early date as having been transposed from a form of P-Celtic into Gaelic that this occurred prior to the transformation from "Old British" into modern Welsh. There are numerous Scottish place names with Brythonic roots although the number of island names involved is relatively small.

Linguistic division in early twelfth century Scotland. Gaelic speaking Norse-Gaelic zone, use of either or both languages English-speaking zone Cumbric speaking zone

The Pictish language offers considerable difficulties. It is a term used for the language(s) thought to have been spoken by the Picts, the people of northern and central Scotland in the Early Middle Ages. It may have been a fifth branch of Brythonic; Kenneth H. Jackson thought that the evidence is weak, but Katherine Forsyth disagreed with his argument. The idea that a distinct Pictish language was perceived at some point is attested clearly in Bede's early 8th-century Historia ecclesiastica gentis Anglorum, which names it as distinct from both Old Welsh and Old Gaelic. However, there is virtually no direct attestation of Pictish short of the names of people found on monuments in the lands controlled by the Picts - the area north of the Forth-Clyde line in the Early Middle Ages. Many of these monuments include elaborate carved symbols, but an understanding of their significance has so far proved as elusive as interpretation of the few written fragments, which have been described as resembling an "odd sort of gibberish". Nonetheless, there is significant indirect place-name evidence for the Picts use of Brythonic or P-Celtic. The term "Pritennic" is sometimes used to refer to the proto-Pictish language spoken in this area during the Iron Age.

Given the paucity of knowledge about the Pictish language it may be assumed that islands names with P-Celtic affiliations in the southern Hebrides, and Firths of Clyde and Forth are Brythonic and those to the north and west are of Pictish origin.

Old Gaelic is a Goidelic language that arrived via Ireland due to the growing influence of the kingdom of Dalriada from the 6th century onwards. It was formerly spoken over a far wider area than today. Scottish Gaelic, along with modern Manx and Irish, are descended from Middle Irish, a derivative of Old Gaelic, which is descended in turn from Primitive Irish. This the oldest known form of the Goidelic languages, which is known only from fragments, mostly personal names, inscribed on stone in the Ogham alphabet in Ireland and western Britain up to about the 6th century. Its modern form is still spoken in parts of the Scottish Highlands and the Hebrides, and in Scottish cities by some communities. The Beurla-reagaird is a Gaelic-based cant of the Scottish travelling community.

=== Norse and Norn ===
Old Norse is a North Germanic language that was spoken by inhabitants of Scandinavia and of their overseas settlements during the Viking Age, until about 1300. Its influence on Scots island names is considerable due to the development of both the Earldom of Orkney and the Kingdom of the Isles which resulted in almost all of the inhabitable islands of Scotland (except those in the Firth of Forth) coming under Norse control from the 9th to 13th centuries.

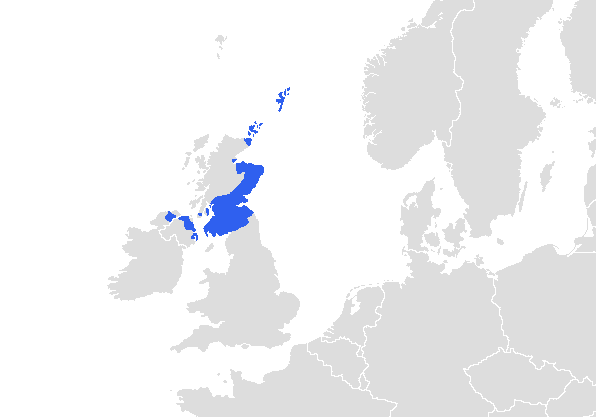
Areas where the Scots language was spoken in the twentieth century.

Norn is an extinct North Germanic language that developed from Old Norse and was spoken in Shetland, Orkney and possibly Caithness. Together with Faroese, Icelandic and Norwegian it belongs to the West Scandinavian group. Very little written evidence of the language has survived and as a result it is not possible to distinguish any island names that may be Norn rather than Old Norse. After the Northern Isles were pledged to Scotland by Norway in the 15th century, the early Scottish Earls spoke Gaelic when the majority of their subjects spoke Norn and both of these languages were then replaced by Insular Scots.

=== English and Scots ===
English is a West Germanic language, the modern variant of which is generally dated from about 1550. The related Scots language, sometimes regarded as a variety of English, has regional and historic importance in Scotland. It is officially recognised as autochthonous language under the European Charter for Regional or Minority Languages. It is a language variety historically spoken in Lowland Scotland and parts of Ulster.

Although they are the dominant languages in modern Scotland the presence of both Scots and English in island names is limited.

== Earliest names ==
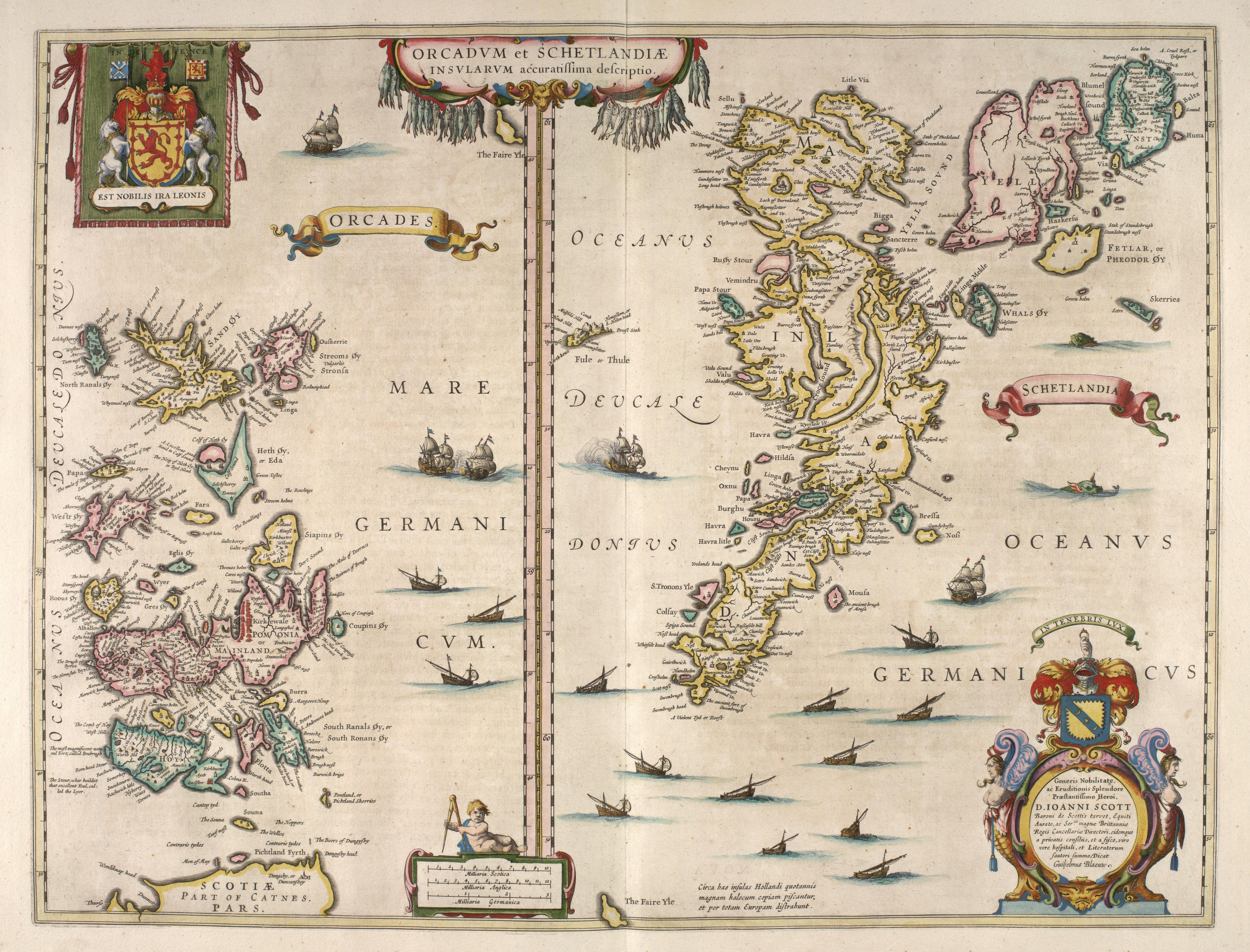
Blaeu's 1654 map of Orkney and Shetland. Map makers at this time continued to use the original Latin name Orcades.

The earliest written references to Scottish islands were made by classical authors in Latin and Ancient Greek. At a much later date the Ravenna Cosmography, which was compiled by an anonymous cleric in Ravenna around AD 700, mentions various Scottish island names. This document frequently used maps as a source of information and it has been possible to speculate about their modern equivalents based on assumptions about voyages made by early travellers 300–400 years prior to its creation. (Note: Youngson (2001) draws heavily on the work of the Gaelic scholar Donald MacEachern for his identifications.) The presence of the monastery on Iona led to life in this part of Scotland in the Early Middle Ages being relatively well recorded from the mid-6th to the mid-9th century. Norse settlers in Scotland had a significant influence on toponyms from the 9th century onwards although there is little contemporary documentation of this period of Scottish history by those who lived there. From 849 on, when Columba's relics were removed in the face of Viking incursions, written evidence from local sources all but vanishes for three hundred years. Some modern island names appear to have ancient pre-Celtic roots as identified below.

Pytheas of Massilia visited Britain – probably sometime between 322 and 285 BC – and described it as triangular in shape, with a northern tip called Orcas. This may have referred to Dunnet Head on mainland Scotland, from which Orkney is visible. Writing in the 1st century AD, the Roman geographer Pomponius Mela called the islands of Orkney Orcades, as did Tacitus in 98 AD, claiming that his father-in-law Agricola had "discovered and subjugated the Orcades hitherto unknown" (although both Mela and Pliny the Elder had previously referred to the islands).

In AD 43 and circa AD 77 respectively Pomponius Mela and Pliny (in his Natural History) also referred to seven islands they respectively called Haemodae and Acmodae, both of which are assumed to be Shetland. The earliest written references that have survived relating to the Hebrides also appear in the Natural History, where Pliny states that there are 30 Hebudes, and makes a separate reference to Dumna, which Watson concludes is unequivocally the Outer Hebrides. Writing about 80 years later, in 140-150 AD, Ptolemy, drawing on the earlier naval expeditions of Agricola, wrote that there were only five Ebudes (possibly meaning the Inner Hebrides) and Dumna. (Note: Breeze (2002) quotes J.J. Tierney who believed that Ptolemy's information about Scotland "was extremely poor".) Later texts in Latin, by writers such as Solinus, use the forms Hebudes and Hæbudes.

Location of the Kingdom of Mann and the Isles at the end of the 11th century

For the individual Hebridean islands, Islay is Ptolemy's Epidion, Malaios is Mull and his Scetis is presumed to be Skye (although it is not listed as one of the Ebudes).

Adomnán, the 7th century abbot of Iona, recorded the names of various islands in the Hebrides. Unlike the unnamed monk of Ravenna and his classical forebears, Adomnán was clearly writing about places with which he was familiar. It is therefore possible that some of these records indicate for the first time names used by the islands' inhabitants.There are also various early references from texts written in Ireland and Scotland - 'Celtic' in the list below.

The following table lists island names that are either recorded prior to AD 1200 or, in the case of the Norse names for the Suðreyjar, were probably recorded at a slightly later date but are likely to have been in use by then. The rulers of the Kingdom of the Isles, which comprised the Hebrides, the islands of the Firth of Clyde and the Isle of Man were of Norse origin from the mid-9th century. (Note: After the dissolution of the Kingdom of the Isles Mann was then under intermittent Scots rule from 1266 to 1346. Mann continued to play a significant role in the ecclesiastical affairs of Scotland for several centuries thereafter - see Bishop of the Isles.)

These Scandinavian settlers were "past masters in the art of analogical reformation" meaning that when they heard the names of islands from the native population they amended the sounds so that they became "known words or phrases in their own language" in a way that did not reflect the original meaning. Thus Ljoðhús means "song-house" (an unlikely name for an island) and Orcades (probably "islands of the boar people") became Orkneyar meaning "seal islands".

Island or Archipelago	Classical (Note: There are numerous variants - Broderick (2013) provides a comprehensive listing for these and other early names.)	Ravenna	Adomnán	Old Norse	Celtic	Notes
Shetland	Haemodae/Acmodae			Hetlandensis	Insi Catt	The location of "Thule", first recorded by Pytheas, is not known for certain. When Tacitus mentioned it in AD 98 it is likely he was referring to Shetland. (Note: In Agricola of AD 98 Tacitus describes the discovery and conquest of Orkney and records that the Roman fleet had seen "Thule, too". Watson (1926) is sure that Tacitus was referring to Shetland, although Breeze (2002) is more sceptical. Thule is first mentioned by Pytheas but it is unlikely he meant Shetland as he believed it was six days sail north of Britain and one day from the frozen sea.)
Orkney	Orcades insulae			Orkneyar	Insi Orc	The Anglo-Saxon monk Bede also referred to the Orcades insulae in Ecclesiastical History of the English People.
Outer Hebrides	Dumna				Domon/Doman	Possibly references to Lewis and Harris rather than the entire archipelago.
Inner Hebrides	Hebudes/Ebudes			Suðureyjar/Suðreyiar etc.	Erdomon/Iardomon	The Old Irish Erdomon means "near" or "east of" Domon.
Lewis		Linnonsa		Ljoðhús	Leodus, Lyodus	
Uists				Ívist		The original meaning of the name is uncertain but appears to "correspond with that of Lewis". (Note: A meaning of "lush island" from the Phonenician has been suggested.)
Shiant Isles		Exosades				
Skye	Scetis	Scitis/Scetis	Scia	Skíð	Sceth, Scii etc.	
Canna		Elvania	Elena			Kanna in Old Norse.
Rùm		Erimon			Ruim, Ruiminn	
Eigg		Sobrica	Egea		Ega, Ego	
Coll			Colossus	Kolbeinsey		Also Kollr in Old Norse.
Tiree		Birila	Ethica Terra	Tyrvist	Tir iath	"Tir iath" is 6th century.
Mull	Malaios	Maiona	Male(a)	Mýl	Muile	
Iona		Esse	I	Eyin helga	Iae, Ioua, Hiona-Columcille etc.	The Norse name means "Holy Isle" - see also Eynhallow.
Colonsay			Hinba?			Hinba's location is uncertain and controversial. (Note: Youngson (2001) records MacEachern's view that Hinba insula and Hinbina insula are Colonsay and the nearby tidal islet of Oronsay but there are several other candidates.)
Oronsay			Hinbina?		Eilean Orain?	Hinbina may mean simply "little Hinba". (Note: Youngson writes that "MacEachern is the only scholar to write on the subject who pays any attention at all to the fact that in extract XXI Adomnán refers to an island called Hinbina - presumably "Little Hinba". Only Colonsay and Oronsay provide a large and little island".)
Islay	Epidion	Elete	Ilea	Íl	Ili, Ilea, Ile	
Texa		Atina	Oidech/Aithche			
Jura		Saponis	Saine/Sainea		Doiread Eilinn	Youngson is "quite convinced by MacEachern's reasoning about Saine/Sainea". (Note: Dyrøy from the Norse for "deer island" is the generally accepted derivation of the modern name.)
Gigha		Canna		Guðey		The Ravenna name may refer to Cara, off Gigha.
Bute		Botis		Bót	Bot, Bote	
Arran		Manna		Herray/Hersey	Aru, Arann, Arran	
Great Cumbrae		Magnancia		Kumreyar		The Norse is a collective noun for both Cumbraes
Little Cumbrae		Anas				
Ailsa Craig		Cunis				
Rathlin	Rhicina/Eggarikenna/Rignea/Ricnea etc.	Regaina	Rechrea		Rachra, Ragharee, Reachrainn & Rechru	Watson suggests that the linguistic connection between Rhicina and Rechru is "not obvious".
Man	Mona/Monopia/Mevania etc.	Mona		Mön	Manau/Mano	Old Welsh records use the name Manaw.

Youngson offers suggestions for the other Scottish islands mentioned in the Ravenna Cosmography. He believes Sasura is the modern Scarba, Minerve is Holy Island and Vinion is Sanda and that Daroeda, Gradena and Longis may be Lunga, The Garvellachs and Muck respectively. See below for further interpretations of the Ravenna list which is "obscure in the extreme".

Watson (1926) concluded that Adomnán's Airtraig is Shona but Geona and Ommon are unexplained and Longa could refer to several islands. It has also been suggested that Nave Island off Islay could be the identity of Elena.

For details of the first recorded Norse names for the individual islands of Orkney and Shetland, many of which will also have been in use prior to their being written down in the Norse sagas circa 1300, see Northern Isles. Gammeltoft also lists the Norse saga names of Kjarbarey (Kerrera), Rauney (Rona) and Sandey (Sanday) in the Hebrides and Saltíri, Satíri etc. referring to the peninsula of Kintyre. The Norse Barreyarfjorder is probably the Sound of Barra and Máeyar is the Isle of May in the Firth of Forth.

There are few other recorded names for these islands from early dates. Hudson suggests the Innisib Solian found in the Chronicle of the Kings of Alba refers to the island of Seil (Note: The entry records a victory of the Scots over the Danes during the time of Donald II in the 9th century.) and the Book of Leinster refers to the island as Sóil for AD 568. Hirta was recorded as "Hirt" in 1202.

In the above table there is some linguistic continuity between the earliest and modern names for almost all of the fifteen largest islands surrounding Scotland. (Note: See Scottish islands by area for a list of these islands. Including those assumed to have a pre-Norse root the only outright exception may be Hoy. (Although not immediately obvious, it is possible that the Pictish "cat" sound forms part of the Old Norse name for Shetland and may thus have informed the modern name.)) However, the derivations of many of these early names are obscure "suggesting that they were coined very early on, some perhaps by the earliest settlers after the Ice Age. We do not know what languages the people spoke who may have coined some of these names." It therefore seems possible that the early Gaels were just as fond of "analogical reformation" as the Norse. Perhaps then we should think these island names "as pre-Celtic and also as pre-Indo-European, a solution ‒ if it solves anything - that leaves us with the thought that practically all the major islands in the Northern and Western Isles have very old names, so old and so linguistically and lexically opaque that we do not have any plausible referents for them elsewhere. They are linguistic fossils, perhaps some three thousand years old or even older."

=== Ravenna Cosmography interpretations ===
The main difference between Youngson/MacEeachern and Fitzpatrick-Matthews is that the former assumes two different routes for the relevant Ravenna listings whereas the latter assumes the second list is further north and west. Fitzpatrick-Matthews describes Rivet and Smith's identification of Bath in south-west England as "a little fanciful as we are dealing with islands in the northern part of the Irish Sea" and is sceptical about some of their other suggestions for similar reasons. Fitzpatrick-Matthews follows Rivet and Smith's suggestion for Erimon but as noted above Rùm is "Ruiminn" in the Félire Óengusso. Fitzpatrick-Matthews chooses Colonsay for Regaina although his reasoning for not preferring the "usual" identification of Rathlin may exaggerate Watson's remark on the topic. (Note: Per the above, Watson suggests that the linguistic connection between Rhicina and Rechru is "not obvious" whereas Fitzpatrick-Matthews suggests he implied "there is no linguistic connection between the two forms".)

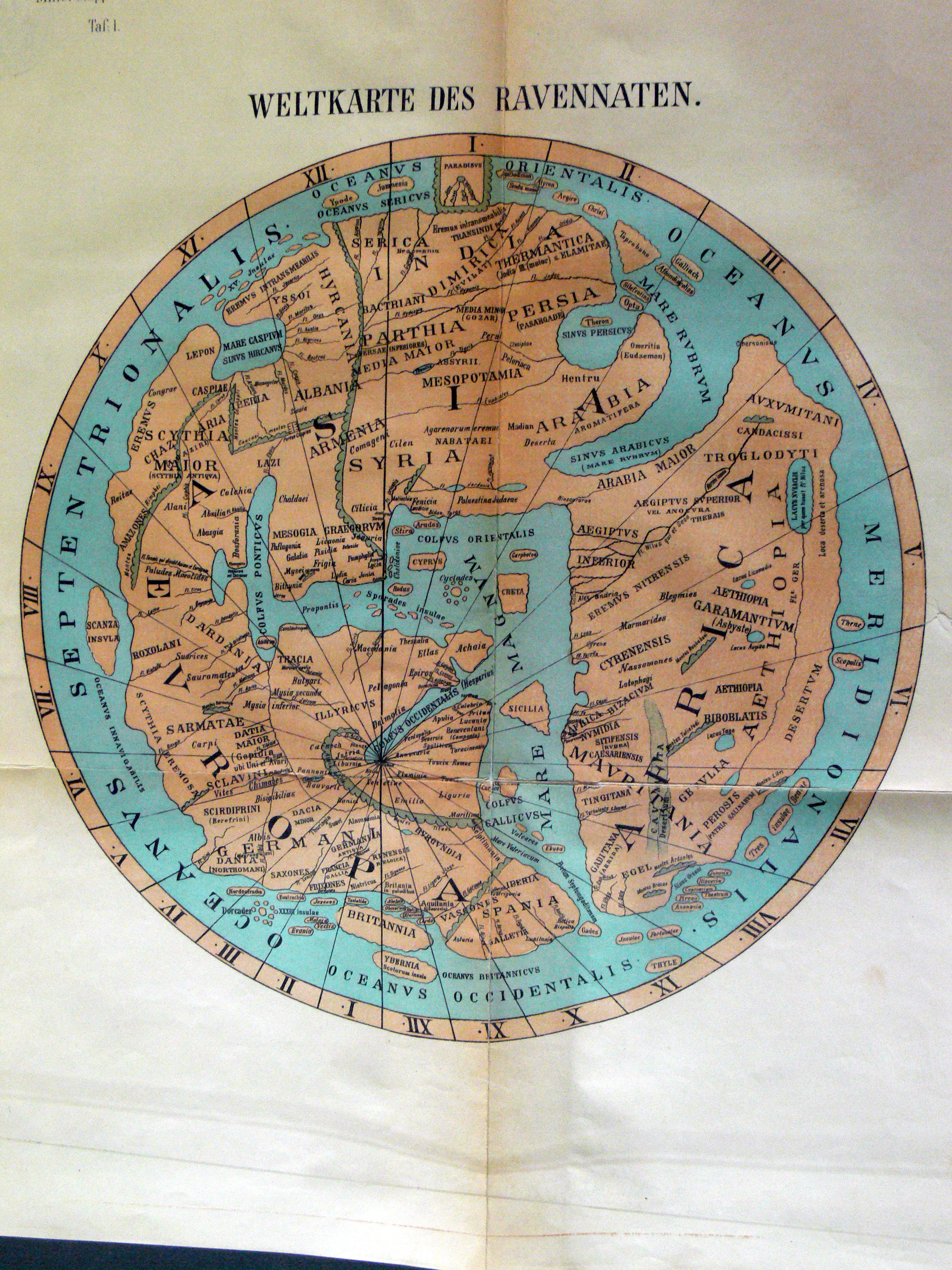
Map based on the Ravenna Cosmography

Ravenna Name	Youngson	Fitzpatrick-Matthews	Rivet and Smith
Linnonsa	Lewis	Raasay?	
Exosades	Shiant Isles	Barra, Sandray, Pabbay	
Scetis	Skye	Skye	
Erimon	Rùm	Desert Island?	Desert Island
Sobrica	Eigg	Rùm?	River Severn
Elvania	Canna	Loch Awe and River Awe?	River Avon
Birila	Tiree	Lismore?	
Maiona	Mull	Mull	
Elete	Islay	Loch Ailort?	
Atina	Texa	Eigg?	River Eden
Saponis	Jura	Seil?	
Canna	Gigha	Canna	
Sasura	Scarba	Kerrera?	
Minerve	Holy Island	Islay?	Aquae Sulis
Vinion	Sanda	Luing?	
Daroeda	Lunga	Muck?	
Esse	Iona	Coll?	
Gra(n)dena	The Garvellachs	Tiree?	
Longis	Muck	Loch Linnhe	
Botis	Bute	Bute	Bute
Manna	Arran	Arran	
Magnancia	Great Cumbrae	North Uist?	
Anas	Little Cumbrae	South Uist?	
Cunis	Ailsa Craig	Jura?	River Kenwyn
Regaina	Rathlin	Colonsay?	Rathlin
Mona	Isle of Man	Anglesey	

The designation "desert island" may seem odd for a part of the world that experiences frequent rain, but the Celtic monastic system called their isolated retreat centres deserts and the implication is that a retreat of some kind existed there.

== Modern names ==
The earliest comprehensive written list of Hebridean island names was undertaken by Donald Monro in his Description of 1549, which in some cases also provides the earliest written form of the modern island name.

=== Pre-Celtic remnants ===
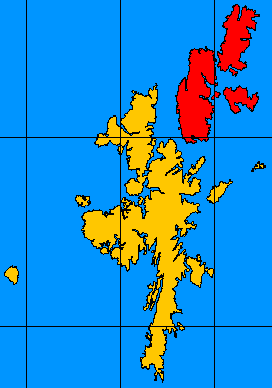
Shetland with Fetlar, Unst, and Yell highlighted in red

There are three island names in Shetland of unknown and possibly pre-Celtic origin: Fetlar, Unst and Yell. The earliest recorded forms of these three names do carry Norse meanings: Fetlar is the plural of fetill and means "shoulder-straps" Omstr is "corn-stack" and í Ála is from ál meaning "deep furrow". However these descriptions are hardly obvious ones as island names and are probably adaptations of a pre-Norse language. This may have been Pictish but there is no clear evidence for this.

The roots of several of the Hebrides may also have a pre-Celtic origin. Indeed, the name comes from Ebudae recorded by Ptolemy, via the mis-reading "Hebudes" and may itself have a pre-Celtic root.

- Mull was recorded by Ptolemy as Malaios possibly meaning "lofty isle" although it is pre-Gaelic in origin. In Norse times it became Mýl.
- The 7th century abbot of Iona Adomnán records Coll as Colosus and Tiree as Ethica, which may be pre-Celtic names.
- Islay is Ptolemy's Epidion, the use of the "p" hinting at a Brythonic or Pictish tribal name. Adomnán refers to the island as Ilea and it occurs in early Irish records as Ile and as Il in Old Norse. The root is not Gaelic and of unknown origin.
- The etymology of Skye is complex and may also include a pre-Celtic root.
- Lewis is Ljoðhús in Old Norse and although various suggestions have been made as to a Norse meaning (such as "song house") the name is not of Gaelic origin and the Norse credentials are questionable.
- The origin of Uist (Old Norse: Ívist) is similarly unclear.
- Rùm may be from the Old Norse rõm-øy for "wide island" or Gaelic ì-dhruim meaning "isle of the ridge" although Mac an Tàilleir (2003) is unequivocal that it is a "pre-Gaelic name and unclear".
- Seil is probably a pre-Gaelic name, although a case has been made for a Norse derivation.
- The etymology of Arran is also obscure. Haswell-Smith (2004) offers a Brythonic derivation and a meaning of "high place". The Acallam na Senórach describes Arran as being "between Alba and Cruithen-land" although there is possible confusion in the annals between the meaning of Cruithen to refer to the Picts, the Cruithnigh of Ireland and the Welsh equivalent of Prydain to refer to Britain as a whole. In support of the Vasconic substratum hypothesis, Vennemann notes the recurrence of the element aran, (Unified Basque haran) meaning "valley", in names like Val d'Aran, Arundel, or Arendal. In early Irish literature Arran is "Aru" and Watson (1926) notes there are similar names in Wales but suggests it may be pre-Celtic.

=== Brythonic & Pictish names ===
Several of the islands of the Clyde have possible Brythonic roots. In addition to Arran (see above) Bute may have a British root and Great and Little Cumbrae both certainly have (see below).

Inchkeith in the Firth of Forth is recorded as "Insula Keth" in the 12th century Life of Saint Serf. The name may derive from Innis Cheith or Innis Coit and both Mac an Tàilleir (2003) and Watson (1926) suggest that the root is the Brthyonic coed. The derivation would appear to be assumed rather than attested and the modern form is Innis Cheith. Caer in Welsh means a "stone-girt fort" and was especially applied to Roman camp sites. This is the root of Cramond Island in the Forth, with Caramond meaning "the fort on the Almond river". The island of Threave on the River Dee in Dumfries and Galloway takes its name from P-Celtic tref, meaning "homestead".

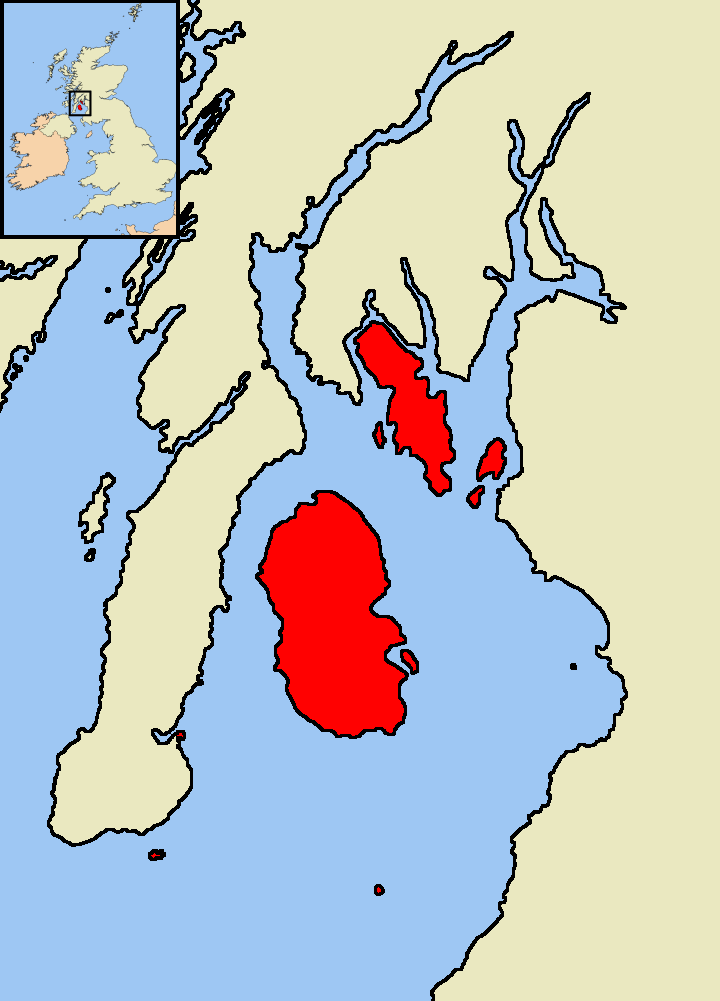
The islands of the Clyde. The largest are Arran, Bute, and Great and Little Cumbrae, all of which names may have a Brittonic root.

It is assumed that Pictish names must once have predominated in the northern Inner Hebrides, Outer Hebrides, Orkney and Shetland although the historical record is sparse. For example, Hunter (2000) states that in relation to King Bridei I of the Picts in the sixth century: "As for Shetland, Orkney, Skye and the Western Isles, their inhabitants, most of whom appear to have been Pictish in culture and speech at this time, are likely to have regarded Bridei as a fairly distant presence.” However, the place names that existed prior to the 9th century have been all but obliterated by the incoming Norse-speaking Gall-Ghaeils.

Orkney is pre-Norse in origin and Pictish, as may be the uninhabited Orkney island name Damsay, meaning "lady's isle". Remarkably few Pictish placenames of any kind can be identified in Orkney and Shetland, although some apparently Norse names may be adaptations of earlier Pictish ones. There are various ogham inscriptions such as on the Lunnasting stone found in Shetland that have been claimed as representing Pictish, or perhaps even a precursor language.

In the 14th century John of Fordun also records the name of Inchcolm as "Eumonia" (referring to the monasterium Sancti Columbe in insula Euomonia) a name of likely Brythonic origin.

=== Norse names ===
From some point before 900 until the 14th century both Shetland and Orkney became Norse societies. The Norse also dominated the Hebrides and the islands of the Clyde for much of the same period, although their influence was much weaker there from the 13th century onwards. According to Ó Corráin (1998) "when and how the Vikings conquered and occupied the Isles is unknown, perhaps unknowable" although from 793 onwards repeated raids by Vikings on the British Isles are recorded. "All the islands of Britain" were devastated in 794 with Iona being sacked in 802 and 806.

As a result, most of the island names in Orkney and Shetland have Norse names and many in the Hebrides are Gaelic transformations of the original Norse, with the Norse ending -øy or -ey for "island" becoming -aigh in Gaelic and then -ay in modern Scots/English.

=== Gaelic influence ===
Geographic Distribution of Gaelic speakers in Scotland (2011)

Perhaps surprisingly Shetland may have a Gaelic root—the name Innse Chat is referred to in early Irish literature and it is just possible that this forms part of the later Norn name Hjaltland— but the influence of this language in the toponymy of the Northern Isles is slight. No Gaelic-derived island names and indeed only two Q-Celtic words exist in the language of modern Orcadians - "iper" from eabhar, meaning a midden slurry, and "keero" from caora - used to describe a small sheep in the North Isles.

The Hebrides remain the stronghold of the modern Gàidhealtachd and unsurprisingly this language has had a significant influence on the islands there. It has been argued that the Norse impact on the onomasticon only applied to the islands north of Ardnamurchan and that original Gaelic place names predominate to the south. However, recent research suggests that the obliteration of pre-Norse names throughout the Hebrides was almost total and Gaelic derived place names on the southern islands are of post-Norse origin.

There are also examples of island names that were originally Gaelic but have become completely replaced. For example, Adomnán records Sainea, Elena, Ommon and Oideacha in the Inner Hebrides, which are of unknown location and these names must have passed out of usage in the Norse era. One of the complexities is that an island such as Rona may have had a Celtic name, that was replaced by a similar-sounding Norse name, but then reverted to an essentially Gaelic name with a Norse ending.

=== Scots and English names ===
In the context of the Northern Isles it should be borne in mind that Old Norse is a dead language and that as a result names of Old Norse origin exist only as loan words in the Scots language. Nonetheless if we distinguish between names of obviously Norse origin and those with a significant Scots element the great majority are in the former camp. "Muckle", meaning large or big, is one of few Scots words in the island names of the Nordreyar and appears in Muckle Roe and Muckle Flugga in Shetland and Muckle Green Holm and Muckle Skerry in Orkney.

Many small islets and skerries have Scots or Insular Scots names such as Da Skerries o da Rokness and Da Buddle Stane in Shetland, and Kirk Rocks in Orkney.

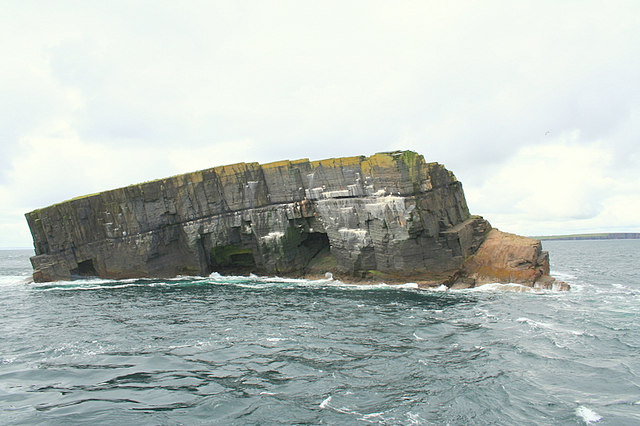
Horse of Copinsay from the north west

Great Cumbrae and Little Cumbrae are English/Brythonic in derivation and there are other examples of the use of "great" and "little" such as Great Bernera and Rysa Little which are English/Gaelic and Norse/English respectively. The informal use of "Isle of" is commonplace, although only the Isle of Ewe, the Isle of May and Isle Martin of the larger Scottish islands use this nomenclature in a formal sense. (Note: Usage is not always consistent. For example, the Ordnance Survey uses "Isle of" for Arran, Bute Gigha, Mull, Noss, Skye and Raasay as do the Royal Mail for some larger islands in their database of addresses. However, authorities that consider Scotland's islands as a whole set tend to avoid this inconsistency e.g. Haswell-Smith, W.H. Murray, and the census.) "Island" also occurs, as in Island Macaskin and Mealista Island although both islands are also known by their Gaelic names of Eilean Macaskin and Eilean Mhealasta. Holy Island off Arran is an entirely English name as is the collective Small Isles. Ailsa Craig is also known as "Paddy's Milestone". Big Scare in the Solway Firth is an English/Norse combination, the second word coming from sker, a skerry.

Some smaller islets and skerries have English names such as Barrel of Butter and the Old Man of Hoy in Orkney and Maiden Island and Bottle Island in the Inner Hebrides.

The Norse often gave animal names to islands and these have been transferred into English in for example, the Calf of Flotta and Horse of Copinsay. Brother Isle is an anglicisation of breiðare-øy meaning "broad beach island". The Norse holmr, meaning "a small and rounded islet" has become "Holm" in English and there are numerous examples of this use including Corn Holm, Thieves Holm and Little Holm.

== Summary of inhabited islands ==
Etymological details for all inhabited islands and some larger uninhabited ones are provided at Hebrides, Northern Isles, Islands of the Clyde and Islands of the Forth.

Based on these tables, for the inhabited off-shore islands of Scotland (and counting Lewis and Harris as two islands for this purpose) the following results apply, excluding Scots/English qualifiers such as "muckle" "east", "little" etc.

Archipelago	Pre-Celtic	Old Norse	Scots Gaelic	Scots/English	Other	Notes	Total
Shetland	3	12	1	0	0	There are two islands with names of joint Norse/Celtic origin, Papa Stour and the Shetland Mainland.	16
Orkney	0	20	0	1	1	Shapinsay is of unknown derivation, the Orkney mainland itself is probably Pictish in origin. South Walls is a Scots name based in part on a Norse root.	22
Outer Hebrides	5	7	4	0	0		16
Inner Hebrides	8	17	12	0	1	The derivation of Easdale is not clear.	38
Islands of the Clyde	0	1	1	1	3	Bute is of uncertain origin and could be Norse, Gaelic or Brythonic. Arran probably has, and Great Cumbrae does have, a Brythonic root.	6
Islands of the Forth	0	0	1	0	0		1
Totals	16	57	19	2	5		99

== See also ==
- Languages of Scotland
- Etymology of Arran
- Etymology of Gigha
- Origin of names of St Kilda
- List of Scottish Gaelic place names
- Goidelic substrate hypothesis
- Insular Celtic languages
