= Muckle =

Muckle may refer to:

== People ==
- Ansetta Muckle de Chabert (1908–1976), businesswoman and activist from Saint Croix, U.S. Virgin Islands
- John Muckle (born 1954), writer of fiction, poetry, and literary criticism

== Places ==
- Muckle Bluff, a bluff on the south coast of Elephant Island in the South Shetland Islands of Antarctica
- Muckle Flugga, a small rocky island north of Unst in the Shetland Islands, Scotland
- Muckle Flugga Lighthouse, punctuates the rocky stack of Muckle Flugga, in Shetland, Scotland
- Muckle Green Holm, uninhabited island in the North Isles of the Orkney archipelago in Scotland
- Muckle Holm (disambiguation), the name of a number of islands in Orkney and Shetland
- Muckle Holm, Yell Sound, small island in Shetland
- Muckle Roe, island in Shetland, Scotland, in St. Magnus Bay, to the west of Mainland, Shetland
- Muckle Skerry, the largest of the Pentland Skerries that lie off the north coast of Scotland
- Muckle Ward, the highest hill in Vementry, an uninhabited island in Shetland, Scotland
- Muckle Water, long, narrow fresh water loch on Ward Hill on Rousay, Orkney, Scotland

== Other ==
- Muckle men or Finn-men were Inuit sighted around the north of Scotland
- Muckle–Wells syndrome (urticaria-deafness-amyloidosis syndrome), a rare autosomal dominant disease
- Muckle Snippeck or Eurasian woodcock (Scolopax rusticola), a medium-small wading bird in subarctic Eurasia
- Muckle Spate (1829), flood in August 1829 which devastated much of Strathspey in northeast Scotland

== See also ==
- Willcock v Muckle
- MUCL (disambiguation)
- Muck (disambiguation)
- Mucke
