= Muckle Holm =

Muckle Holm is the name of a number of islands in Orkney and Shetland. It is an oxymoron, since muckle means "big" and "holm" refers to an islet.

== Orkney ==
- Muckle Green Holm

== Shetland ==
- Muckle Holm, Yell Sound, in Yell Sound between Sandwick on Yell, and Burravoe, Mainland

== See also ==
- Muckle Skerry
- Stoura Stack
- Muckle Ossa
