= Little Holm =

Little Holm is a common island name in Shetland and Orkney. It is a tautology, as "holm" already means a small island.

- Little Holm, Dunrossness
- Little Holm, Yell Sound
