= Holm of Houton =

One of the southern Orkney islands

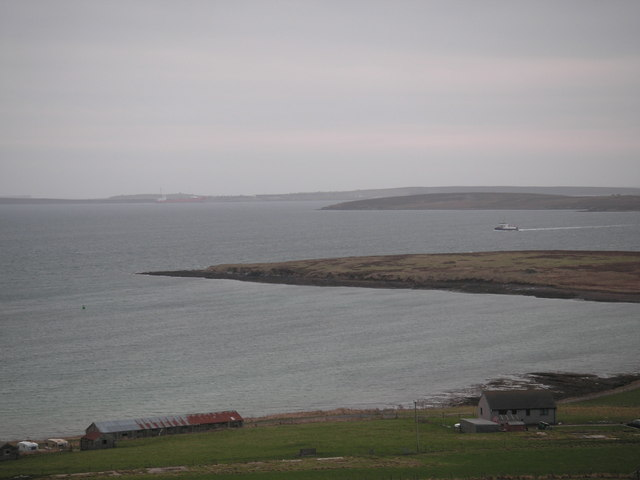
- Holm of Houton offshore of Orkney Mainland, with Cava and Flotta beyond the ferry.

Location
- Holm of Houton shown within Orkney
- OS grid reference: HY315032
- Coordinates: 58.910314°N 3.188783°W

Physical geography
- Island group: Orkney

Administration
- Council area: Orkney Islands
- Country: Scotland
- Sovereign state: United Kingdom

The Holm of Houton is one of the southern Orkney islands.

== Geography ==
The Holm is in Midland Harbour, part of Scapa Flow. It is south of the Mainland parish of Orphir, near Houton whence its name.

The Holm is north of Cava and Rysa Little, and to the north east of Hoy over the Bring Deeps.
