= Hunda =

Uninhabited island in Scotland

Unknown (Gaelic)

Location
- Location within Orkney Islands
- OS grid reference: ND437967
- Coordinates: 58.85°N 2.98°W

Name
- Name meaning: Old Norse meaning 'dog island'.
- Old Norse name: Hunðey

Physical geography
- Island group: Orkney
- Area: 100 hectares (0.39 sq mi)
- Area rank: 149
- Highest elevation: 42 metres (138 ft)

Administration
- Council area: Orkney Islands
- Country: Scotland
- Sovereign state: United Kingdom

Demographics
- Population: 0

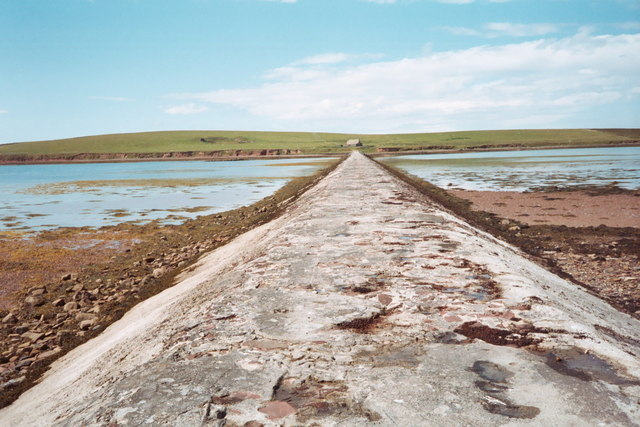
The causeway to Hunda, as seen from the Burray side

Hunda is an uninhabited island in the Orkney archipelago in Scotland. It is 100 hectares (0.39 sq mi) in extent and rises to 42 metres (138 ft) above sea level. It is situated in Scapa Flow and connected to the nearby island of Burray by a causeway built in 1941 to stop passage of small surface craft as part of the boom defences, and thence to the Orkney Mainland via the Churchill Barriers.

The name is derived from the Old Norse for 'dog island'. The Vikings made the Orkney Islands their headquarters for their expeditions against Scotland and Norway, and the islands were under the rule of Norse earls until 1231. The island is rich in bird life, and contains a disused quarry. A small inlet in the northern cliffs is known as 'Sunless Geo'.

Hunda is currently used to raise sheep and goats for wool.

== See also ==
- List of Orkney islands
