= Grassholm (disambiguation) =

Grassholm is an island in Pembrokeshire, Wales.

Grassholm or Grass Holm may also refer to:

- Grassholm, South Georgia, an island in South Georgia
- Grass Holm, Orkney, an island off Gairsay in Scotland

== See also ==
- Grassholme, a village in County Durham, England
