= Gutter Sound =

Sound in Scapa Flow, Orkney, United Kingdom

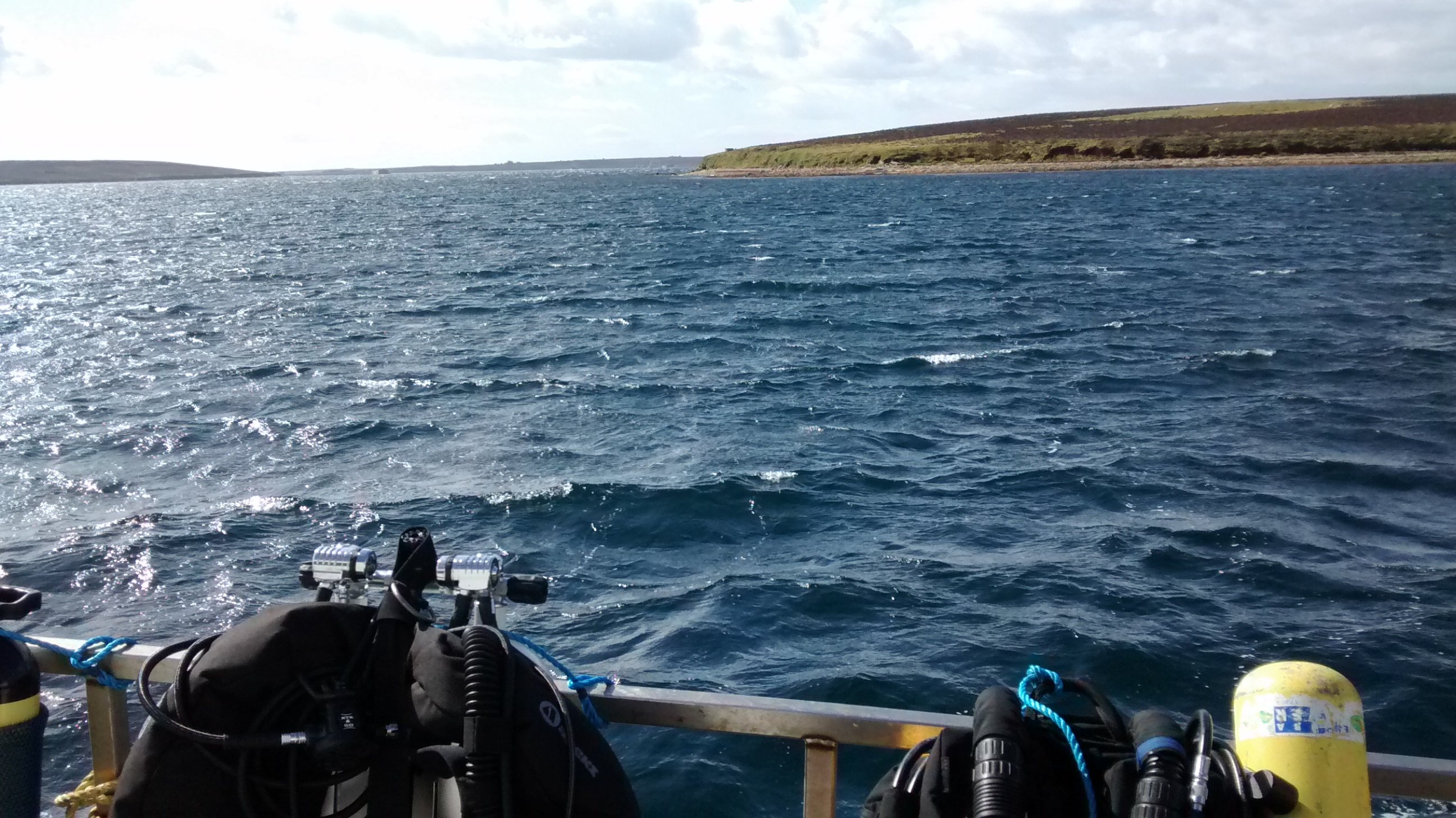
- Rysa Little and Gutter Sound
- Interactive map of Gutter Sound
- Location: Scapa Flow, Orkney, Scotland
- Coordinates: 58°51′03″N 03°11′14″W
- Type: Sound

Gutter Sound is a sound in the Orkney archipelago, Scotland, part of Scapa Flow. It lies to the west of the main harbour between the internal islands of Cava and Fara, and the large outer island of Hoy. Gutter Sound was one of the sites of the scuttling of the interned Imperial German High Seas Fleet in 1919, and the scene of a major salvage operation in the 1920s. The remaining wrecks are frequently visited by recreational divers.

== Location ==
Gutter Sound within Scapa Flow

Gutter Sound is four miles long and a mile wide at its widest point, and has a depth of around 30 meters in places. It separates Hoy and Cava in the north, and Hoy and Fara in the south, opening onto Scapa Flow between Cava and Fara. In the north it opens out into the Bring Deeps, while the south it joins Weddell Sound, between Fara and Flotta, and to Switha Sound, between Flotta and Hoy.

== History ==
At the end of the First World War, Scapa Flow was the anchorage for the surrendered German High Seas Fleet; these vessels were anchored around the island of Cava, in the Sound itself and in the Flow between Cava and the Barrel of Butter skerry. In 1919 this was the scene of the fleet's mass scuttling. 12 capital ships and a number of smaller vessels went down in the Sound itself, the remainder in deep water between Cava and the skerry.

A number of the sunken ships were salvaged by Ernest Cox during the 1920s. He used a variety of techniques, lifting the smaller ships with floating dry docks and hawsers. With the larger ships he patched all of the holes and then pumped the hulls with compressed air to force out the water and make them float upside down. Seven of the wrecks are still at Scapa Flow, and are protected as maritime scheduled monuments.

During the Second World War the Sound was again used as a Royal Navy anchorage, being the site for HMS Proserpine, the stone frigate ashore base at Lyness; it also served for the anti-submarine patrol forces and their depot ship, HMS Dunluce Castle.

Commercial salvage work on the vessels ceased in the late 1970s and further salvage is no longer technically possible.

Lyness is now the site of a Naval Cemetery, and a Heritage Centre detailing these events. it is also the site of a dive centre, as the seven vessels that remain are a common target for divers.

== Diving ==
The seven remaining wrecks are often visited by scuba divers. In addition, debris and wreckage left from the ships salvaged is sometimes dived as well.

Name	Type	Depth
SMS Brummer	light cruiser	36 m (118 ft)
SMS Cöln	light cruiser	36 m (118 ft)
SMS Karlsruhe	light cruiser	36 m (118 ft)
SMS Dresden	light cruiser	25 m (82 ft)
SMS König	battleship	43 m (141 ft)
SMS Kronprinz Wilhelm	battleship	38 m (125 ft)
SMS Markgraf	battleship	47 m (154 ft)
