= MUCL =

MUCL may refer to:

== Organisations ==
- BCCM/MUCL, an environmental and applied mycology collection part of the Belgian Co-ordinated Collections of Micro-organisms
- Vilo Acuña Airport (IATA: CYO, ICAO: MUCL)
