= Pentland Skerries =

Island group in the Orkney Islands, Scotland

Coordinates: 58°41′15″N 2°55′03″W

The Pentland Skerries (Old Norse: Pettlandssker) are a group of four uninhabited islands lying in the Pentland Firth, northeast of Duncansby Head and south of South Ronaldsay in Scotland.

By far the largest of the islands is Muckle Skerry, home to two lighthouses, built in 1794. The other islands lie to the south of Muckle Skerry. From west to east, they are Little Skerry, Louther Skerry and Clettack Skerry.

The skerries form part of the Pentland Firth Islands Important Bird Area (IBA), so designated by BirdLife International because it supports significant breeding populations of seabirds.

== Accidents ==
MV Priscilla ran aground on Pentland Skerries on 18 July 2018.

== See also ==
- List of islands of Scotland
