= Burwick Holm =

Coordinates: 60°09′N 1°18′W

Burwick Holm (Shetland)

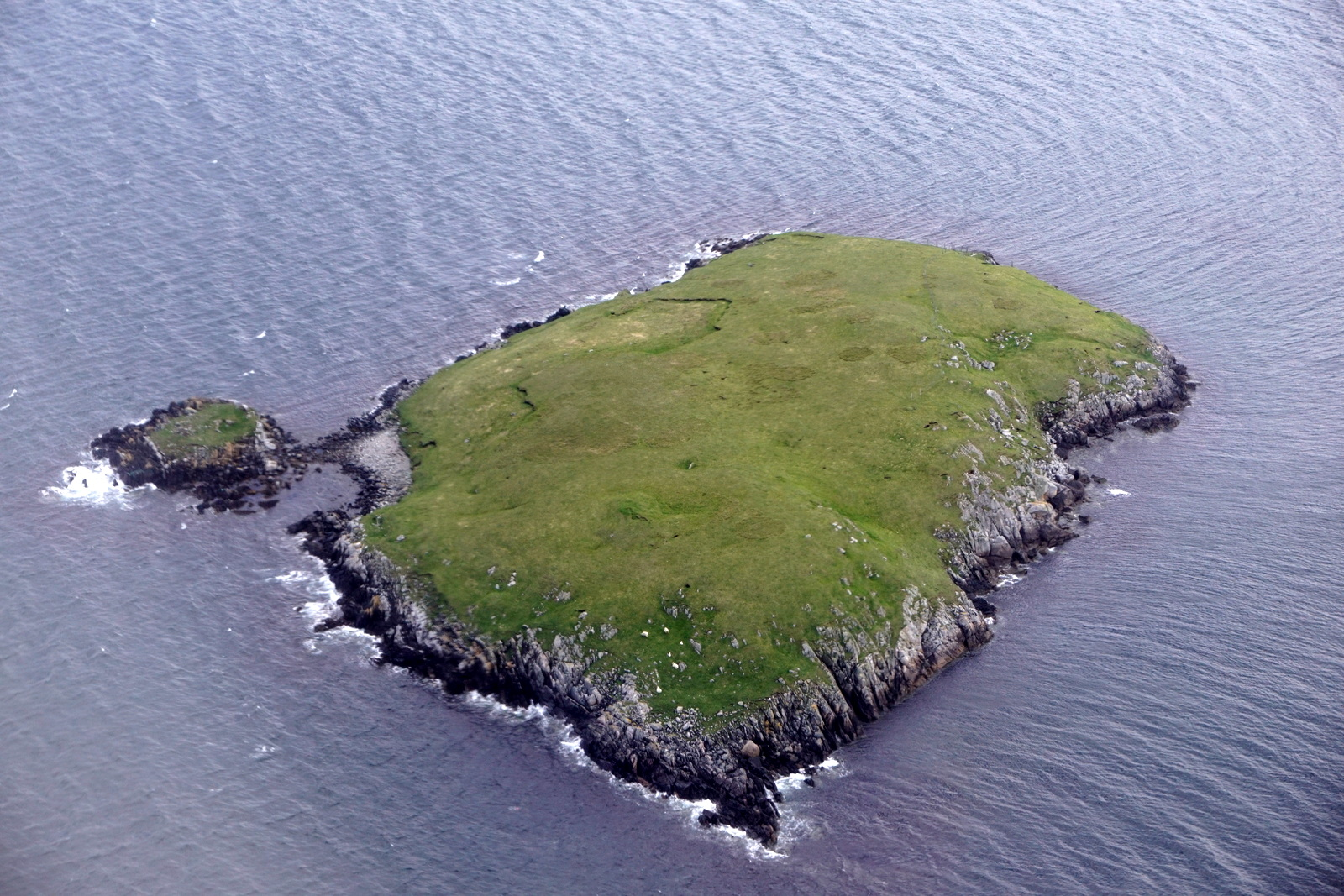
Burwick Holm from ther air

Burwick Holm is a small island off the west coast of Mainland, Shetland. It is located in the Bur Wick inlet, and near Scalloway.
