= Brough Holm =

Coordinates: 60°43′56″N 0°57′47″W

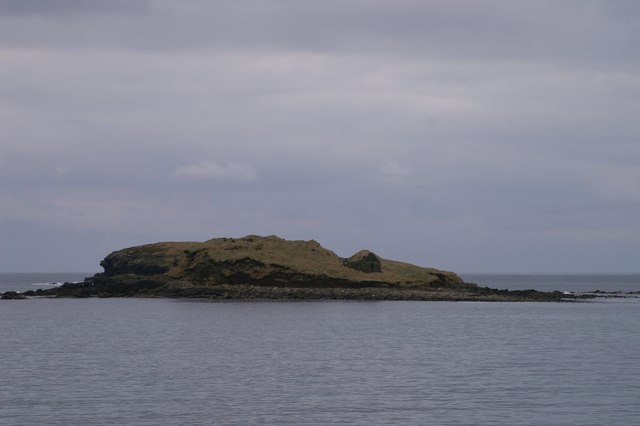
The remains of the broch can be seen on the centre right of the picture.

Brough Holm is a small island off Unst, in the North Isles of Shetland. It is off Westing, which as the name implies is on the west coast of Unst.

The word "brough" refers to the remains of the broch on it.

In 2024, Brough Holm was gifted to the National Trust for Scotland.
