= Rysa Little =

Uninhabited island in the Orkney archipelago in Scotland

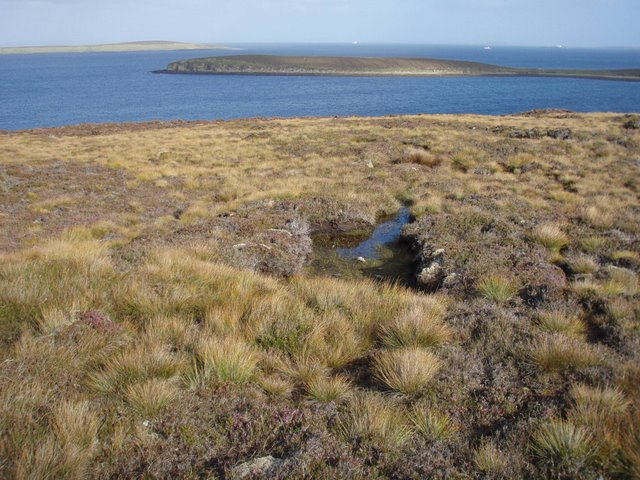
- Rysa Little viewed from Pegal Head on Hoy

Location
- Rysa Little shown within Orkney
- OS grid reference: ND310976
- Coordinates: 58.86°N 3.20°W

Name
- Name meaning: Old Norse and English meaning 'little heap of stones'.
- Old Norse name: Hreysi

Physical geography
- Island group: Orkney
- Area: 32 hectares (0.12 sq mi)
- Highest elevation: 20 metres (66 ft)

Administration
- Council area: Orkney Islands
- Country: Scotland
- Sovereign state: United Kingdom

Demographics
- Population: 0

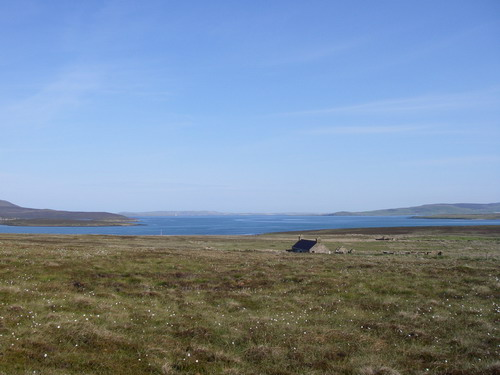
An abandoned House on Fara. Looking North: Rysa Little with Hoy behind to left; Graemsay with Mainland behind centre and right; Cava to right.

Rysa Little, commonly referred to as Rysa, is an uninhabited island in the Orkney archipelago in Scotland. It is approximately 32 hectares (79 acres) in area, and rises to 20 metres (66 feet) above sea level.

It is situated in the Scapa Flow just offshore from the much larger island of Hoy and nearby is the islet of Cava. Between Rysa Little and Fara lies Gutter Sound, the scene of the mass-scuttling of the interned German Imperial High Seas Fleet in 1919.

Many of the smaller South Isles of Orkney lost their resident populations during the course of the twentieth century, but Rysa Little has not been inhabited since earlier times.

== See also ==
List of Orkney islands
