= Sweyn Holm =

Small island in the Orkney Islands

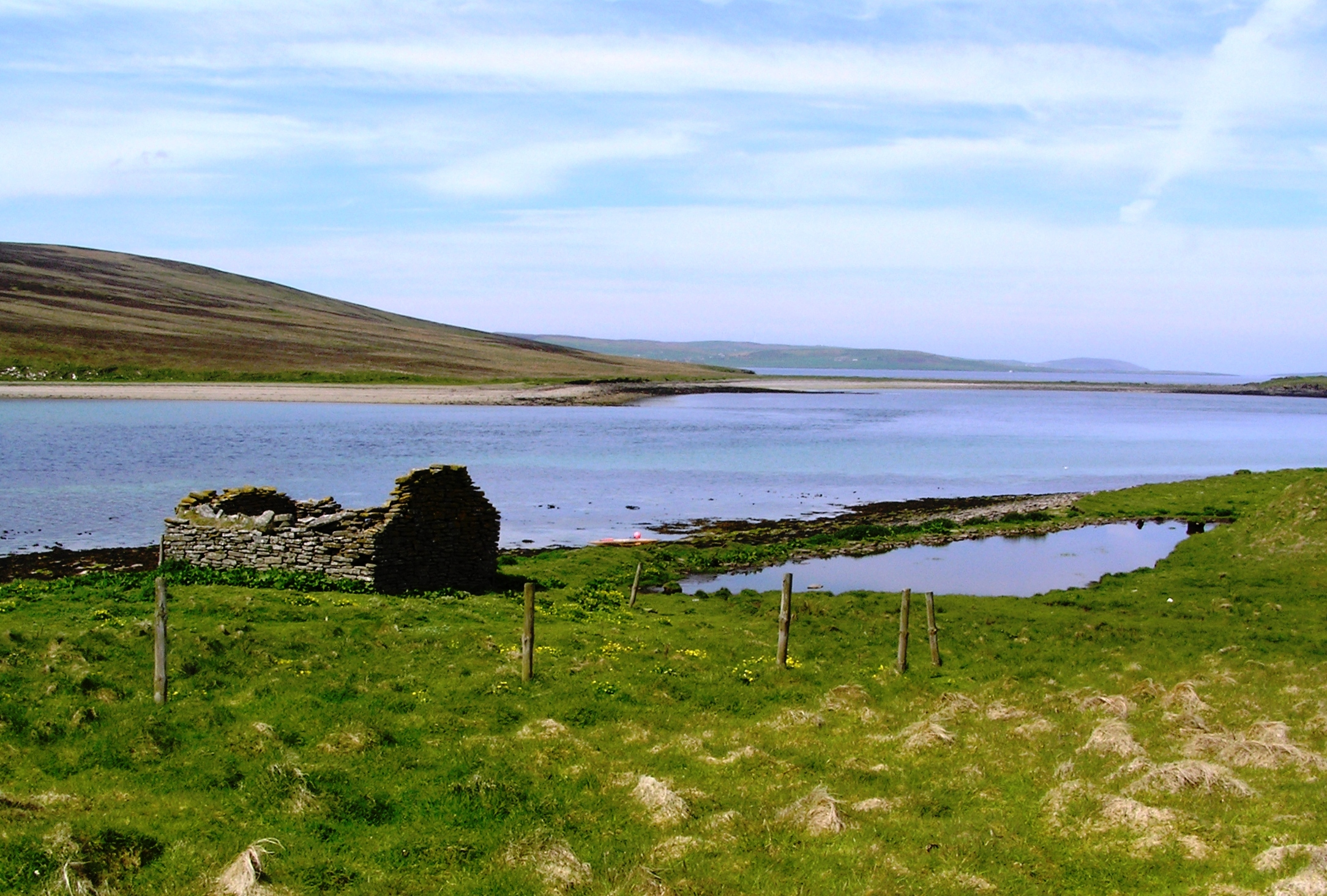
- Ruin on Sweyn Holm

Location
- Sweyn Holm shown within Orkney
- OS grid reference: HY455227
- Coordinates: 59.09°N 2.95°W

Physical geography
- Island group: Orkney

Administration
- Council area: Orkney Islands
- Country: Scotland
- Sovereign state: United Kingdom

Demographics
- Population: 0

Sweyn Holm is a small island in the Orkney Islands, next to Gairsay.

It is thought to be named for Sweyn Asleifsson (Sveinn), who was connected with Gairsay or possibly a corruption of "servant's island" in Norse.

== Geography and geology ==
Sweyn Holm is made up of red sandstone.
