= Fore Holm =

Fore Holm is the name of three of the Shetland Islands.

- Fore Holm, Weisdale Voe between Reawick and Hoy, Shetland
- Forewick Holm off Papa Stour
  - Crown Dependency of Forvik, a micronation located here
