= Holm of Scockness =

Small island in the Orkney Islands

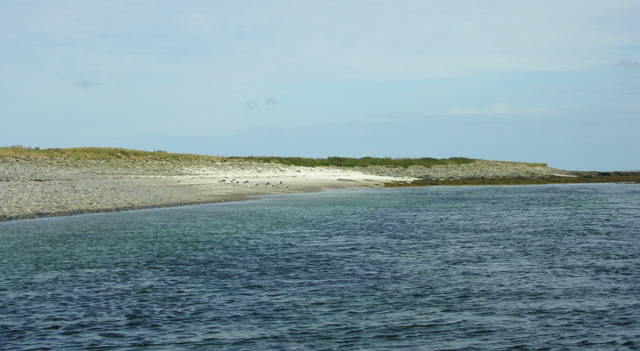
- A sandy bay at the south-east corner of Holm of Scockness

Location
- Holm of Scockness shown within Orkney
- OS grid reference: HY456313
- Coordinates: 59.17°N 2.95°W

Physical geography
- Island group: Orkney

Administration
- Council area: Orkney Islands
- Country: Scotland
- Sovereign state: United Kingdom

Demographics
- Population: 0

The Holm of Scockness is a small island in the Orkney Islands, between Rousay and Egilsay.

It is currently used for grazing.

Its name is Norse in origin and means "little island of the crooked headland".

== Geography and geology ==
The bedrock is middle red sandstone like the neighbouring islands.

It is similar to a map of India in shape, "pointing" southwards.

It is in the north of Rousay Sound, and separated from Rousay itself by the Sound of Longstaing, and from Egilsay by Howie Sound. It is south west of Kili Holm and due north of Wyre's far east coast.
