= Lady's Holm =

Location
- Location within Shetland
- OS grid reference: HU3757409715
- Coordinates: 59.871389°N 1.328889°W

Physical geography
- Island group: Shetland
- Area rank: na
- Highest elevation: 21 m (69 ft)

Administration
- Council area: Shetland
- Country: Scotland
- Sovereign state: United Kingdom

Demographics
- Population: uninhabited

Lady's Holm is an island off southern Mainland in the Shetland Islands. It is not to be confused with the Maiden Stack, which is also known as "Frau Stack"

It is to the west of Scat Ness and the village of Scatness, a headland on Mainland, and there is also another islet nearby, Little Holm.

Sumburgh Airport is about a mile northeast.

It is 21 metres (69 ft) at its highest point, which is marked by a cairn.

It was traditionally used for grazing sheep. Grey seals also inhabit the island and they were badly affected by the oil spill from the MV Brear in 1993.

In 1942, a Bristol Blenheim Mk IV bomber of the RCAF crashed off Lady's Holm.
