= Barrel of Butter =

Skerry in Scapa Flow in the Orkney Islands

Location
- Barrel of Butter shown within Orkney
- OS grid reference: HY351008
- Coordinates: 58.8905°N 3.126°W

Physical geography
- Island group: Orkney

Administration
- Council area: Orkney Islands
- Country: Scotland
- Sovereign state: United Kingdom
- Barrel of Butter lighthouse
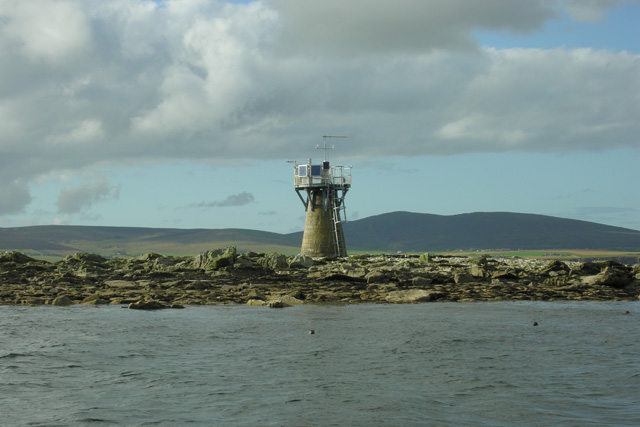
- The navigation light on Barrel of Butter
- Coordinates: 58.890415°N 3.126391°W
- Constructed: 1980
- Construction: masonry tower, metal platform
- Automated: 1980
- Height: 6 metres (20 ft)
- Shape: conical frustum tower with platform and light
- Markings: unpainted tower, grey platform
- Power source: solar power
- Operator: Northern Lighthouse Board
- Focal height: 6 metres (20 ft)
- Range: 7 nmi (13 km; 8.1 mi)
- Characteristic: Fl (2) W 10s.

The Barrel of Butter, formerly known as Carlin Skerry, is a skerry in Scapa Flow in the Orkney Islands.

== Geography and geology ==
The rock is old red sandstone of the Devonian period. There is no soil of any significance on it.

Located in Scapa Flow, between Mainland and Cava, it has a section permanently above sea level. It is to the northeast of Cava, south of Orphir, and north of Flotta.

== History ==
Formerly known as Carlin Skerry, the rock gained its strange name, not from its shape, or position, as is often the case, but from the annual rent paid on it, by the residents of Orphir. In return for a barrel of butter per year, they gained permission from the local laird to hunt the seals on it.

On 21 June 1919, the waters between the Barrel of Butter and Cava became full of scuttled German ships, including the SMS Bayern, Markgraf, Cöln, Dresden and König. Some of these are still popular with divers.

== See also ==
- List of lighthouses in Scotland
- List of Northern Lighthouse Board lighthouses
- Gutter Sound
