= Wether Holm =

Wether Holm or Wedder Holm is the name of several Shetland Islands in Scotland. It means 'small and rounded islet of the wether'.

- Wether Holm, Hamnavoe, by Samphrey in Yell Sound
- Wether Holm, Out Skerries, in the Out Skerries
- Wether Holm, West Linga, near Whalsay
- Wedder Holm, Uyea, by Uyea, Unst
