= Little Holm, Dunrossness =

Little Holm
Unknown (Gaelic)
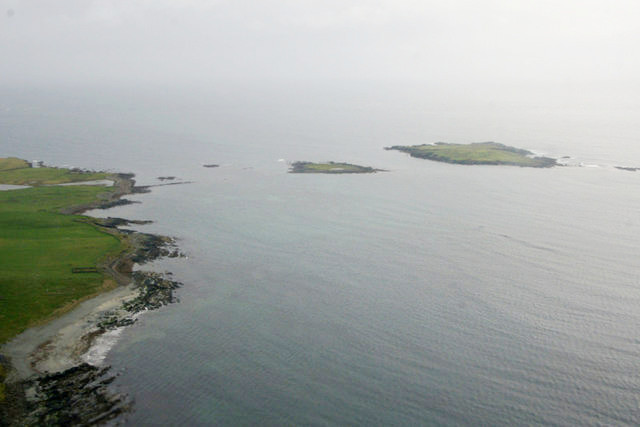
- Aerial view of Little Holm (centre) and Lady's Holm (right)

Location
- Location within Shetland
- OS grid reference: HU3796309688
- Coordinates: 59.871111°N 1.321944°W

Name
- Name meaning: na
- Old Norse name: Unknown

Physical geography
- Island group: Shetland
- Area rank: na

Administration
- Council area: Shetland Islands
- Country: Scotland
- Sovereign state: United Kingdom

Demographics
- Population: 0

Little Holm is a small island to the west of South Mainland in Shetland. It is near Scatness and Lady's Holm. A trawler was wrecked there in 1916.
