= Fara, Orkney =

Island in the Orkney Islands, Scotland

Fara
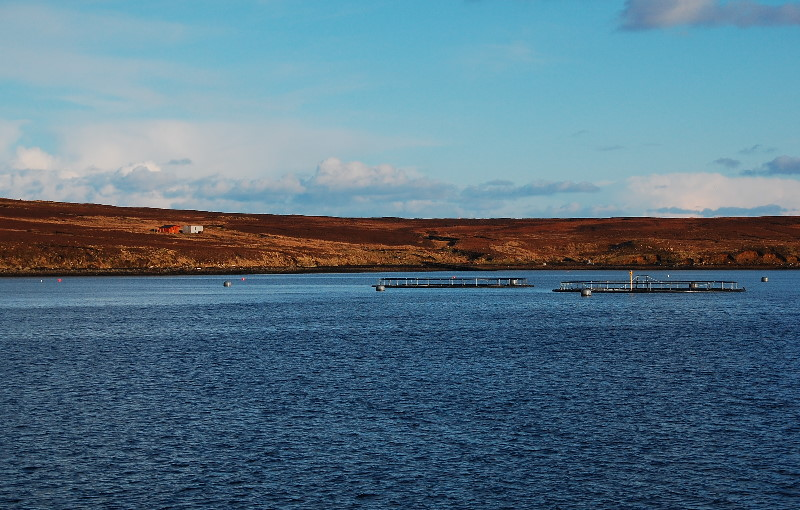
- A fish farm in Gutter Sound, at the western side of Fara

Location
- Fara shown within Orkney
- OS grid reference: ND325955
- Coordinates: 58.85°N 3.175°W

Name
- Name meaning: Island of Sheep (cf Faroe)
- Old Norse name: Færey

Physical geography
- Island group: Orkney
- Area: 295 hectares (1.14 sq mi)
- Area rank: 89
- Highest elevation: 43 m (141 ft)

Administration
- Council area: Orkney Islands Council
- Country: Scotland
- Sovereign state: United Kingdom

Demographics
- Population: 0

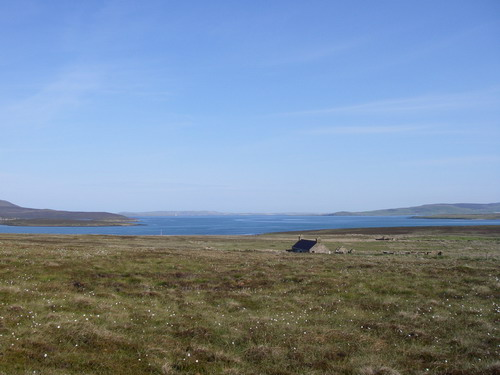
An abandoned House on Fara. Looking North: Rysa Little with Hoy behind to left; Graemsay with Mainland behind centre and right; Cava to right.

Fara (/ˈfærə/, Old Norse: Færey) is a small island in Orkney, Scotland, lying in Scapa Flow between the islands of Flotta and Hoy. It has been uninhabited since the 1960s.
