= Thieves Holm =

- View of Thieves Holm

Location
- Thieves Holm shown within Orkney
- OS grid reference: HY461147
- Coordinates: 59.01°N 2.93°W

Physical geography
- Island group: Orkney

Administration
- Council area: Orkney Islands
- Country: Scotland
- Sovereign state: United Kingdom

Demographics
- Population: 0

Thieves Holm is a small island in Orkney, Scotland.

== Geography and geology ==
Thieves Holm is due north of Mainland, Orkney at the mouth of Kirkwall Bay, between the Mainland and the isle of Shapinsay. It is at the west end of the strait between Mainland and Shapinsay, known as the String. It is south west of the tidal island of Helliar Holm.

The name is said to derive from the practice of banishing thieves and witches there. The island is uninhabited and home to a variety of wildlife including cormorants, kittiwakes and seals.
