= Rusk Holm =

Island in the Orkney Islands

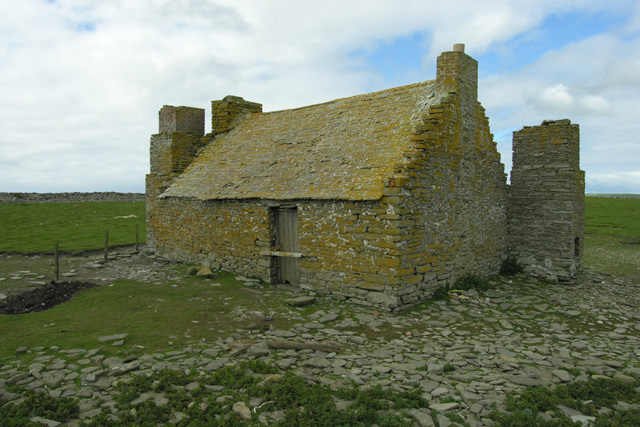
- The bothy at the southern end of Rusk Holm

Location
- Rusk Holm shown within Orkney
- OS grid reference: HY513359
- Coordinates: 59.21°N 2.85°W

Physical geography
- Island group: Orkney

Administration
- Council area: Orkney Islands
- Country: Scotland
- Sovereign state: United Kingdom

Demographics
- Population: 0

Rusk Holm is a small island in the Orkney Islands, near Faray to the west.

== History ==
There is a prehistoric cairn on it .

The island contains a single house with tall, brick-lined chimneys, constructed to accommodate kelp burning during the late eighteenth and early nineteenth centuries.

Rusk Holm is also home to "Holmie Sheep", which are similar to the North Ronaldsay sheep.

== Geography and geology ==
Corn Holm is made up of red sandstone.

It is in Rapness Sound.
