= Calf of Flotta =

Island in Scapa Flow, Orkney, Scotland

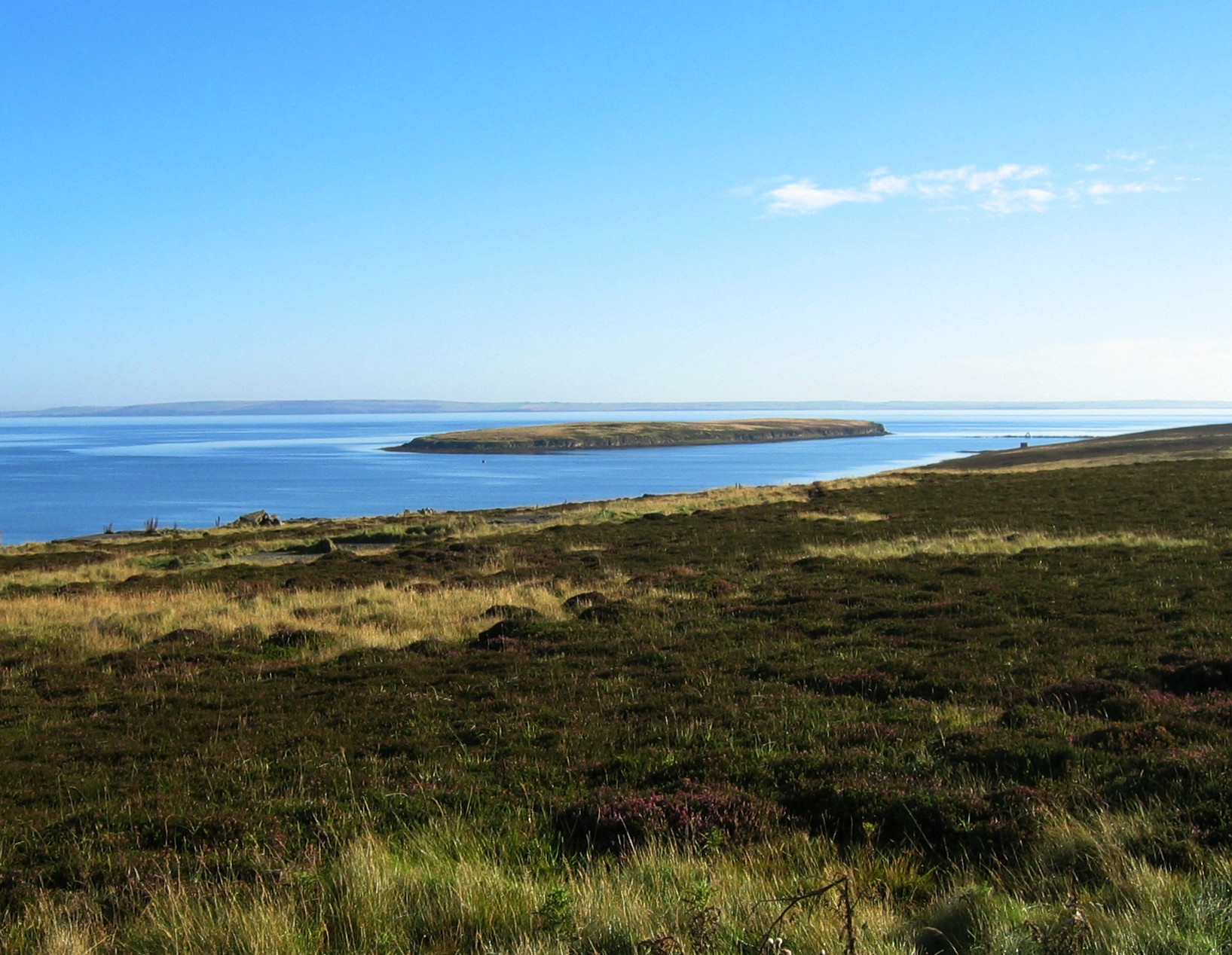
- Calf of Flotta viewed, from the south-west, from Flotta.

Location
- Calf of Flotta shown within Orkney
- OS grid reference: ND381967
- Coordinates: 58.853°N 3.073°W

Physical geography
- Island group: Orkney
- Area: 16 ha (40 acres)
- Highest elevation: 16 m (52 ft)

Administration
- Council area: Orkney Islands
- Country: Scotland
- Sovereign state: United Kingdom

Demographics
- Population: 0

The Calf of Flotta is a small island in Scapa Flow, Orkney. The Calf is next to Flotta, with "Calf" deriving from Old Norse/Norn and meaning a smaller island by a larger one.

== Geography and geology ==
The Calf is made of red sandstone.

It is approximately 1/2 mile (800 metres) long, and is thin in shape, orientated west–east.
