= Cava, Orkney =

Uninhabited island in Scotland

Cava
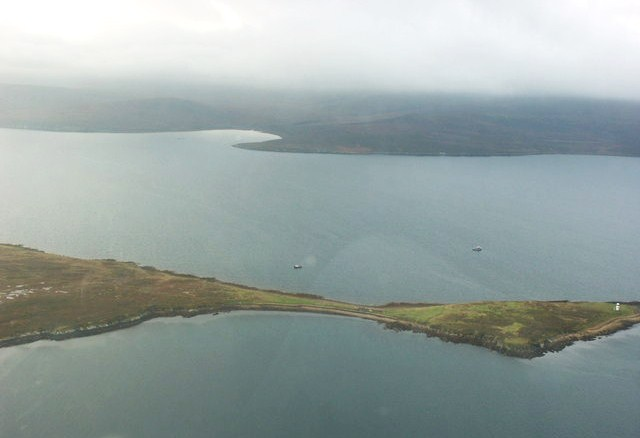
- North Cava and Cava Light, Hoy in background, from a glider flying over Scapa Flow.

Location
- Location within Orkney Islands
- OS grid reference: ND326998
- Coordinates: 58.878530°N 3.167737°W

Name
- Name meaning: Old Norse meaning 'calf island'
- Old Norse name: Kálfey

Physical geography
- Island group: Orkney
- Area: 107 ha (0.41 sq mi)
- Area rank: 147
- Highest elevation: 38 m (125 ft)

Administration
- Council area: Orkney Islands
- Country: Scotland
- Sovereign state: United Kingdom

Demographics
- Population: 0
- Cava Lighthouse
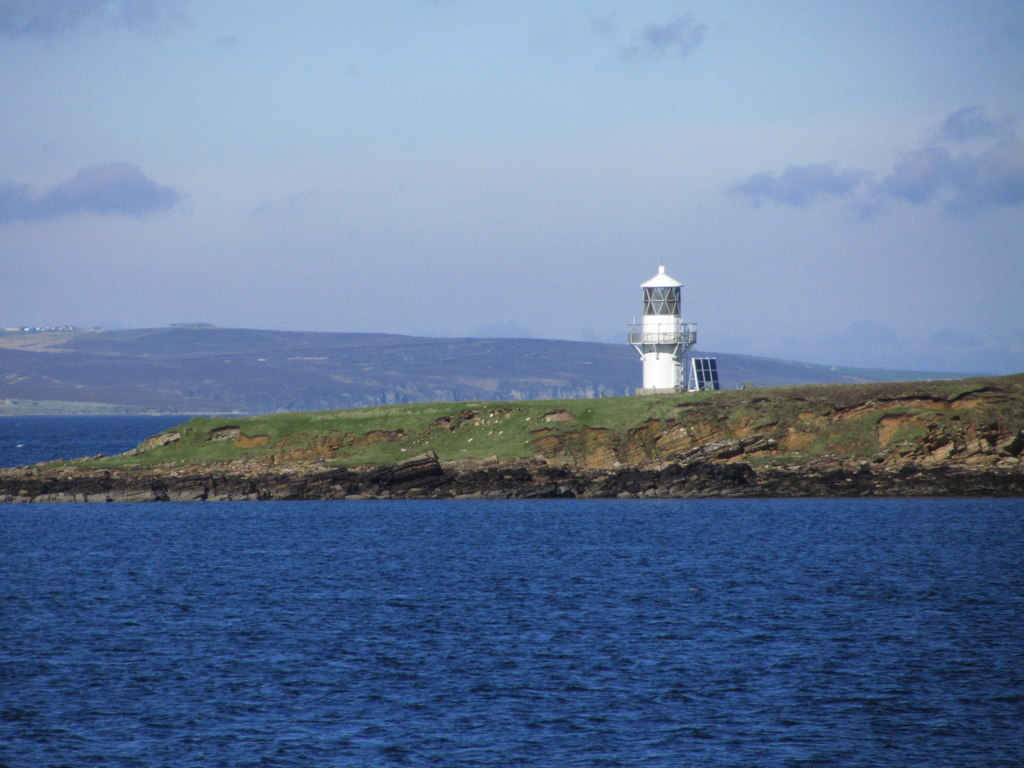
- Calf of Cava lighthouse, at the northern tip of the island
- Coordinates: 58.887160°N 3.177844°W
- Constructed: 1898
- Construction: cast iron tower
- Height: 9.5 metres (31 ft)
- Shape: cylindrical tower with balcony and lantern
- Markings: white tower and lantern
- Power source: solar power
- Operator: Northern Lighthouse Board
- Focal height: 11 metres (36 ft)
- Range: 10 nmi (19 km; 12 mi) (white), 8 nmi (15 km; 9.2 mi) (red)
- Characteristic: Fl WR 3s.

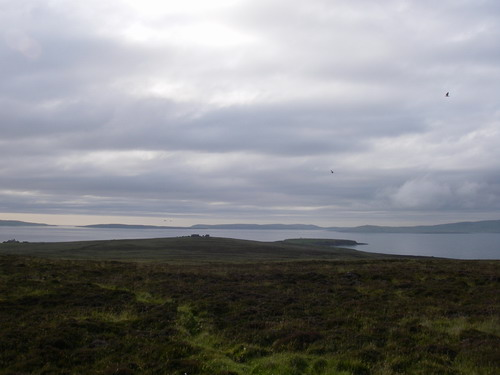
Looking north west from Cava: Graemsay and Mainland are in the background

Cava is an uninhabited island in the Orkney archipelago in Scotland. It is 107 hectares (0.41 sq mi) in extent and rises to 38 metres (125 ft) above sea level. The literal meaning of the name is calf island, a terminology often used to designate a small island near to a larger one. Cava is unusual in that it includes a small peninsula joined to the main body of the island by a narrow isthmus, which is in turn called Calf of Cava.

It is situated in the Scapa Flow just offshore from the much larger island of Hoy. Nearby are the islets of Rysa Little and Fara and the skerry Barrel of Butter. To the south of Cava, between Fara and Rysa Little lies Gutter Sound, the scene of the mass-scuttling of the interned German Imperial High Seas Fleet in 1919.

In the eighteenth century a notorious Orkney pirate, John Gow, raided Hall of Clestrain, in Orphir and abducted two servant girls. Reports vary as to their treatment, with one claiming that they were put ashore on Cava "so loaded with presents that they soon afterwards got husbands." Gow's ship Revenge then ran ashore on the Calf of Eday, leading to his capture.

However, in common with a number of the smaller South Isles of Orkney, Cava lost its resident population during the course of the twentieth century. By the 1980s there were just two residents. There is no longer a habitable building on the island. There are no good anchorages in the vicinity.

== In media ==
In the webcomic Crossed: Wish You Were Here, Cava is a refuge for survivors of an apocalyptic event.

== See also ==
- List of lighthouses in Scotland
- List of Northern Lighthouse Board lighthouses
- Calf of Eday
- Calf of Man
- Calf of Flotta
- List of Orkney islands
