= Helliar Holm =

Uninhabited tidal island off the coast of Shapinsay in the Orkney Islands, Scotland

- The West Coast of Helliar Holm low tide on a rainy day and the wave-cut platform is exposed.

Location
- Helliar Holm shown within Orkney
- OS grid reference: HY484153
- Coordinates: 59.023°N 2.901°W

Physical geography
- Island group: Orkney

Administration
- Council area: Orkney Islands
- Country: Scotland
- Sovereign state: United Kingdom

Demographics
- Population: 0
- Helliar Holm Lighthouse
- Saeva Ness lighthouse at the southern end of Helliar Holm
- Constructed: 1893
- Construction: stone tower
- Automated: 1967
- Height: 42 ft (13 m)
- Shape: cylindrical tower with balcony and lantern
- Markings: white tower, black lantern, ochre trim
- Power source: solar power
- Operator: Northern Lighthouse Board
- Heritage: category B listed building
- Focal height: 18 m (59 ft)
- Range: white: 14 nautical miles (26 km; 16 mi) red: 10 nautical miles (19 km; 12 mi)
- Characteristic: Fl WRG 10s

Helliar Holm is an uninhabited island off the coast of Shapinsay in the Orkney Islands, Scotland. It is home to a 42-foot-tall (13 m) lighthouse, which was built in 1893 and automated in 1967. It is a tidal island that used to be connected to Shapinsay. It is still possible to walk across from the mainland during very low tides.

The island also has the ruins of a broch, cairn and chapel.

In the Orkneyinga Saga it is referred to as both "Hellisey" and "Eller Holm" and John of Fordun refers to it as "Helene-holm".

== Gallery ==
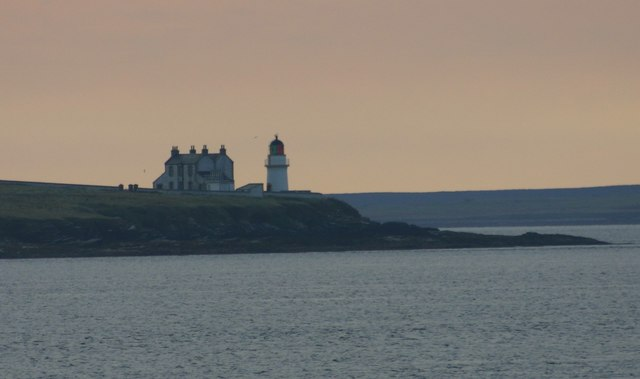
Saeva Ness lighthouse on the tip of Helliar Holm

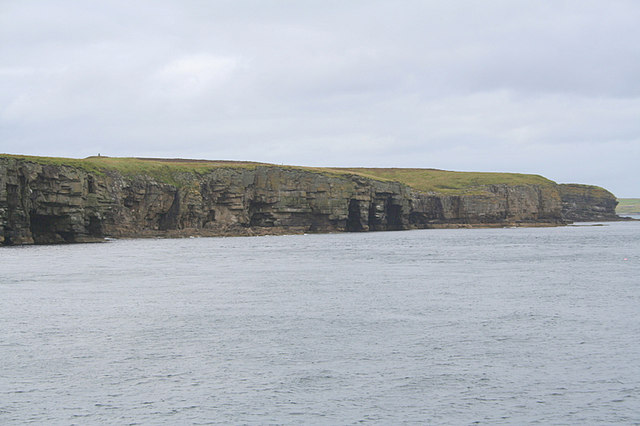
Cliffs and chambered cairn on Helliar Holm.

== See also ==
- List of lighthouses in Scotland
- List of Northern Lighthouse Board lighthouses
