= Gairsay =

Small island in Orkney, Scotland

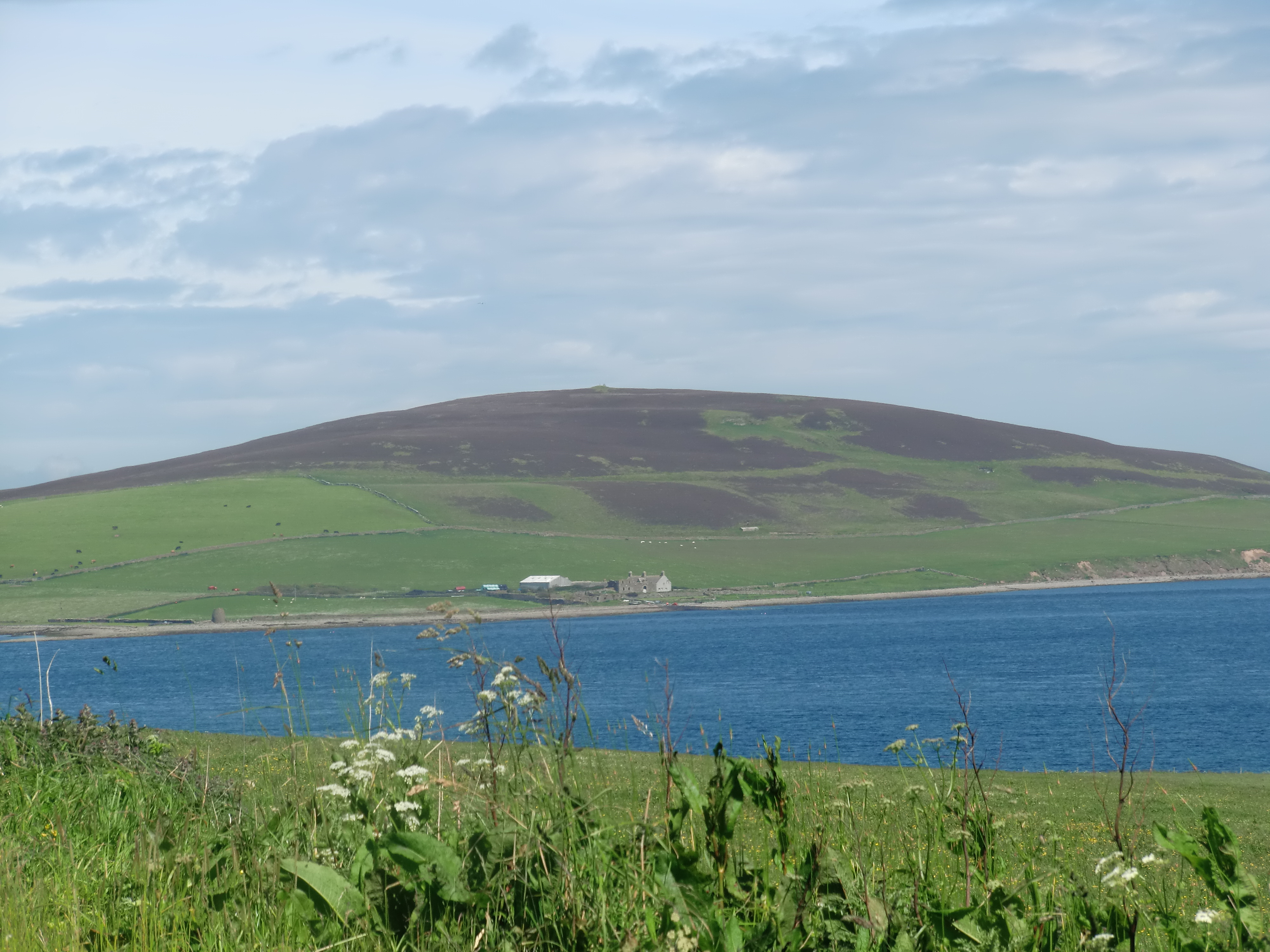
- Gairsay from Mainland Orkney

Location
- Gairsay shown within Orkney
- OS grid reference: HY446222
- Coordinates: 59.083°N 2.966°W

Name
- Name meaning: Gárekr's isle
- Old Norse name: Gáreksey

Physical geography
- Island group: Orkney
- Area: 240 hectares (0.93 sq mi)
- Area rank: 99=
- Highest elevation: 102 metres (335 ft)

Administration
- Council area: Orkney Islands
- Country: Scotland
- Sovereign state: United Kingdom

Demographics
- Population: 6
- Population rank: 76=
- Population density: 2.5 people/km^{2}

Gairsay (Old Norse: Gáreksey) is a small island in Orkney, Scotland, in the parish of Rendall, 1.5 miles (2.4 km) off the coast, astride one of the approaches to the bays of Firth and Kirkwall. It is about 2 miles (3.2 km) long and 1 mile (1.6 km) wide and includes one conical hill and a small harbour called Millburn Bay, which is sheltered by the peninsula known as the Hen of Gairsay.

== History ==
=== Viking age ===
According to the Orkneyinga saga, in Norse times Gairsay was the winter home of the Norse chieftain Sweyn Asleifsson, one of the last great Vikings. He farmed during the summer months and spent the winters with his eighty men-at-arms on his Gairsay estate. After the spring planting had been done, Sweyn would go on Viking raids down the coast of Scotland, England and Ireland. He died attempting to conquer Dublin in the year 1171.

=== 17th to 19th centuries ===
A mansion called Langskaill was built on the site of Sweyn's estate in the 17th century by a wealthy merchant, Sir William Craigie, who lived there with his wife Margaret Honyman, daughter of the Bishop of Orkney. He was a member of Parliament and died in Edinburgh in 1712.

According to census records, in 1831 there were 69 people living on Gairsay, and 71 people in fifteen families in 1841. In the 1841 census it was stated that: "The island used to be noted for the quantity of kelp [soda ash from seaweed] made on it. None has for some years been made on it." In 1851 there were only 41 people in six families living on the island. Ten years later the population was down to 34 people in only five families. By 1881 that number was 37 people in only four families. In recent years the island was owned by one family, named McGill, who purchased the island in 1968 and now farm half of it and who issue their own postage stamps. Gairsay is one of the few Scottish islands permitted to do this because of the lack of a Royal Mail service. The Bichan family of Orphir have been tenant farmers of half the island since before it was purchased by the McGills and continue to raise sheep there.

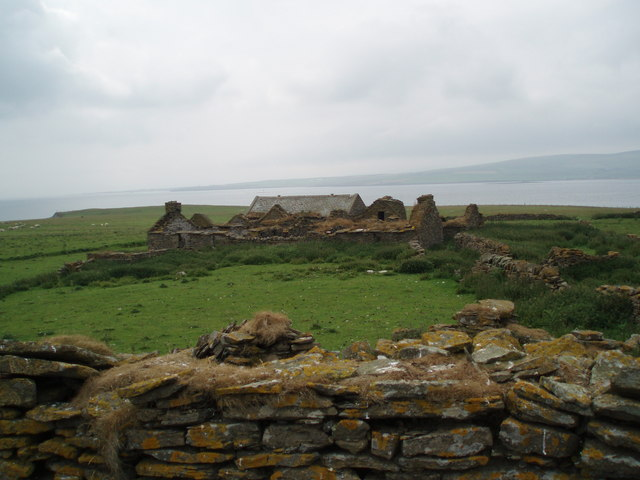
A derelict farm on Gairsay

The following are passages from 19th-century Scottish gazetteers about the island of Gairsay. According to the 1840 Topographical Gazetteer of Scotland:

GAIRSA (sic), one of the Orkneys, constituting part of the parish of Rendal (sic), from which it is separated by a strait about 1 1/2 mile broad. This island is about 2 miles long, and 1 broad; the greater part of it consists of a conical hill of considerable altitude. The whole of its west side is steep; but towards the east, it is both plain and fertile; and in that quarter, as well as on the south, the lands are well-cultivated. It contained 69 inhabitants in 1838. Close by the south shore stand the remains of an old house which seems formerly to have possessed some degree of elegance and strength, and was the residence of Sir William Craigie, and others of that name and family. Here is a small harbour, called the Mill-burn, perfectly secured on all sides by the island itself; and a small holm, which covers the entrance to the south, leaving a passage on each side of it to the anchoring ground.

Samuel Lewis's 1846 Topographical dictionary of Scotland made very similar observations:

GAIRSAY, an island, in the parish of Evie and Rendall, county of Orkney; containing 71 inhabitants. This is an isle of the Orkney group, about four miles (six km) in circuit, and separated by a strait from Rendall. It consists chiefly of a conical hill of considerable altitude; the whole of the west side is pretty steep, but towards the east it is more level and fertile, and in this quarter, and in the south, the lands are tolerably well cultivated. Here is a small harbour called the Mill-Burn, perfectly secured on all sides by the island itself, and by a holm, which covers the entrance to the south, leaving a passage on each side of it to the anchoring ground.

== See also ==
- List of islands of Scotland
