= Little Holm, Yell Sound =

Little Holm Lighthouse
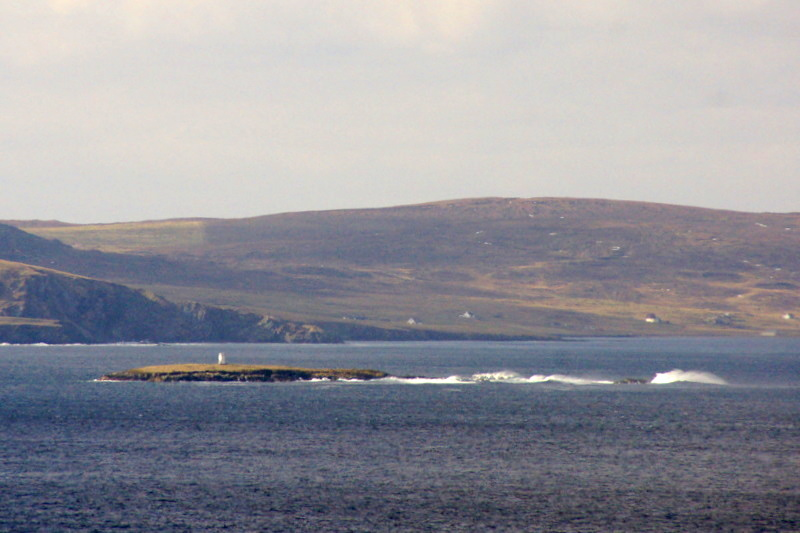
- Little Holm lighthouse, one of the many beacons in Yell Sound
- Location: Little Holm; Yell Sound; Shetland; Scotland; United Kingdom
- Coordinates: 60.557051°N 1.264523°W

Tower
- Constructed: 1976
- Foundation: concrete base
- Construction: metal skeletal tower
- Automated: 1975
- Height: 7 metres (23 ft)
- Shape: quadrangular tower covered by aluminium panels with light on the top
- Markings: white tower
- Power source: solar power
- Operator: Northern Lighthouse Board

Light
- Focal height: 12 metres (39 ft)
- Range: 6 nmi (11 km; 6.9 mi)
- Characteristic: Iso W 4s.

Little Holm is a small island in Yell Sound, in Shetland, Scotland. It lies between Northmavine and the island of Yell.

There is a lighthouse here.

In 1983, the Royal Navy cleared ordnance from the area, and their bomb disposal team discovered an unrecorded shipwreck nearby. Its identity is still unknown.

== See also ==
- List of lighthouses in Scotland
- List of Northern Lighthouse Board lighthouses
