= Kili Holm =

Tidal island in the Orkney Islands, linked to Egilsay

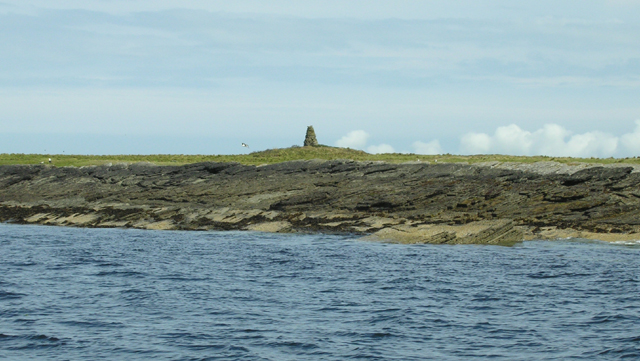
- Cairn on Kili Holm

Location
- Kili Holm shown within Orkney
- OS grid reference: HY475325
- Coordinates: 59.176°N 2.919°W

Physical geography
- Island group: Orkney

Administration
- Council area: Orkney Islands
- Country: Scotland
- Sovereign state: United Kingdom

Kili Holm is a tidal island in the Orkney Islands, linked to Egilsay. Unusually, like its neighbour Egilsay, it may have a partly Gaelic etymology, in this case from cille meaning a monk's cell (Egilsay may derive from eaglais a church). This may make it another “Papey” or island of the papar or culdees.

There is a cairn on the island, and it is currently used as rough grazing for sheep.

== Geography and geology ==
Kili Holm is made up of red sandstone.

It is separated from Egilsay by Smithy Sound, which dries out at low tide. The north east is known as Point of Ridden, and the north west as Point of Pitten. The west is known as Marlow.

It is due east of Rousay, and much further to the north is Westray.
