= Muckle Holm, Yell Sound =

Muckle Holm Lighthouse
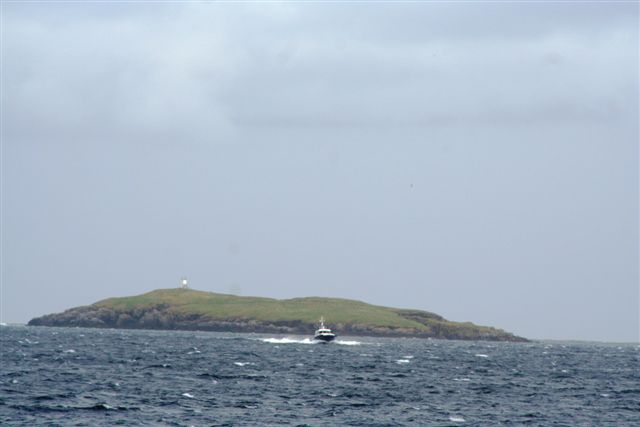
- Muckle Holm and the lighthouse on the top
- Location: Muckle Holm; Yell Sound; Shetland; Scotland; United Kingdom
- Coordinates: 60.580660°N 1.266765°W

Tower
- Constructed: 1976
- Foundation: concrete base
- Construction: metal skeletal tower
- Automated: 1976
- Height: 32 metres (105 ft)
- Shape: square tower covered by aluminium panels with light on the top
- Markings: white tower
- Power source: solar power
- Operator: Royal Society for the Protection of Birds

Light
- Focal height: 7 metres (23 ft)
- Range: 10 nmi (19 km; 12 mi)
- Characteristic: Fl (4) W 10s.

Muckle Holm is a small island in Shetland. It is in Yell Sound, near the Northmavine. It is 23 metres (75 ft) at its highest point.

There is a lighthouse, first lit in 1976.

== See also ==
- List of lighthouses in Scotland
- List of Northern Lighthouse Board lighthouses
