= Muckle Skerry =

Island off the Scottish coast

Pentland Skerries High Light
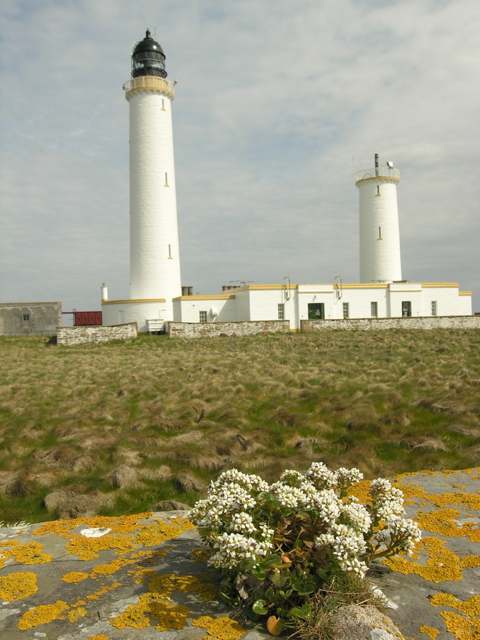
- Pentland Skerries High and Low Lighthouses
- Location: Muckle Skerry; Pentland Skerries; Orkney; Scotland; United Kingdom
- Coordinates: 58.690221°N 2.924735°W

Tower
- Constructed: 1794
- Built by: Thomas Smith, Robert Stevenson
- Construction: stone tower
- Automated: 1994
- Height: 36 m (118 ft)
- Shape: cylindrical tower with balcony and lantern
- Markings: white tower, black lantern, ochre trim
- Power source: solar power
- Operator: Northern Lighthouse Board

Light
- First lit: 1820s rebuilt
- Focal height: 52 m (171 ft)
- Intensity: 710,000 candela
- Range: 23 nmi (43 km)
- Characteristic: Fl (3) W 30 s

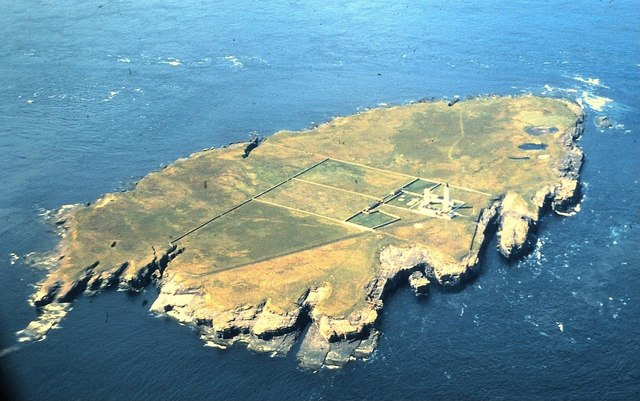
Aerial photograph of Muckle Skerry

Muckle Skerry is the largest of the Pentland Skerries, a group of uninhabited islets that lie off the north coast of Scotland in the Pentland Firth. It is home to the Pentland Skerries Lighthouse, which is in the north of the island.

The skerry is approximately 1 km (0.6 mi) by 0.6 km (0.4 mi), with an area of 40 ha (100 acres). It is surrounded by low cliffs, with caves and geos. There is a small landing point in Scartan Bay, to the east, with a track to the lighthouse. There is also a small burial ground. Together with Swona, it forms the Pentland Firth Islands SSSI.

== Geography ==
Muckle Skerry lies in the Pentland Firth at grid reference ND464782. It is the westernmost of the skerries. At one kilometre (five furlongs) long and rising to an elevation of 20 metres (65 feet) above sea level, it is sizable enough to be considered an island. However, the notoriously bad weather of the firth has historically rendered Muckle Skerry uninhabitable and as such it is more often thought of as a skerry.

Possible remains of a broch at the head of Saltwater Geo in the north-east of the island were reported by a former lighthouse keeper. The Royal Commission on the Ancient and Historical Monuments of Scotland state that despite the area being marked "Brough Geo" and "The Brough" on historic maps, it is unlikely to be a broch, as the walls were reported to be only 5 to 5 1/2 ft (1.5 to 1.7 m) wide.

=== Important Bird Area ===
The skerry is part of the Pentland Firth Islands Important Bird Area (IBA), so designated by BirdLife International because it supports significant breeding populations of seabirds.

In July 2022, NatureScot advised people to stop visiting 23 small Scottish Islands due to concerns over Avian influenza. Public landings were stopped on Muckle Skerry until the end of August that summer to protect breeding puffins, Arctic skuas and Arctic terns.

== Pentland Skerries Lighthouse ==
The first Pentland Skerries Lighthouse was constructed in 1794 by the Commissioners of the Northern Lights. Two towers were built 60 and 80 ft (18 and 24 m) high and 60 ft (18 m) apart. The engineers were Thomas Smith and his stepson Robert Stevenson (this was the first light that Stevenson officially worked on, although the family would go on to construct most of the lighthouses in Scotland over the next 150 years).

Between 1821 and 1830, the lighthouse was rebuilt, and in 1895 the double fixed lights were deemed not suitable, so were replaced by a powerful group of flashing lights.

In 1939, the light was upgraded to electric power, provided by diesel generators. The site was fully automated in 1994.

== Maritime incidents ==
On 17 July 1884, the Vicksburg ran aground on Muckle Skerry, causing the loss of nine lives, however the four lighthouse keepers managed to save 12 of the 21 on board. The vessel was carrying coal from its home port of Leith to Quebec.

On 23 August 1965, MV Kathe Niederkirchner ran aground on the western side of Muckle Skerry in thick fog. The Rostock-registered vessel was carrying a 10 000 ton cargo of sugar. All 50 on board were saved by two lighthouse keepers climbing down a cliff to the lifeboat, and once aboard, guiding it to the safety of the east landing of Muckle Skerry.

On 17 March 1969, the lifeboat TGB was launched from Longhope Lifeboat Station in a severe storm to assist the 2,600 ton steamship Irene. The lifeboat was last seen 1/2 mi (0.8 km; 0.4 nmi) north-east of the Pentland Skerries Lighthouse. All eight crew on board were lost.

== See also ==
- List of lighthouses in Scotland
- List of Northern Lighthouse Board lighthouses
