= Muckle Green Holm =

Uninhabited island in the North Isles of the Orkney archipelago in Scotland

Unknown (Gaelic)
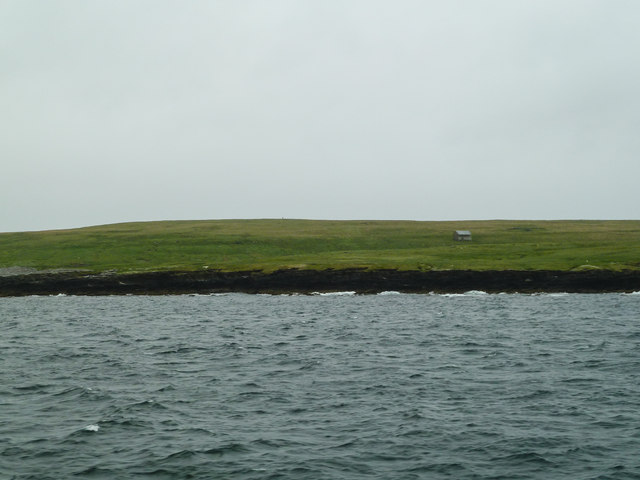
- Muckle Green Holm seen from the north-west

Location
- Muckle Green Holm shown within Orkney
- OS grid reference: HY525272
- Coordinates: 59.13°N 2.83°W

Name
- Name meaning: Mixture of Scots and Old Norse meaning 'large green small round island'.
- Old Norse name: Hellisey

Physical geography
- Island group: Orkney
- Area: 28 hectares (0.11 sq mi)
- Highest elevation: 28 m (92 ft)

Administration
- Council area: Orkney Islands
- Country: Scotland
- Sovereign state: United Kingdom

Demographics
- Population: 0

Muckle Green Holm is an uninhabited island in the North Isles of the Orkney archipelago in Scotland. It is roughly 28 hectares (0.11 sq mi) in extent and rises to 28 metres (92 ft) above sea level, the summit having a triangulation pillar.

== Name ==
'Muckle' is Scots for 'big' or 'large'; 'holm' is from the Old Norse holmr, a small and rounded islet.

== Geography ==
To the south lies Little Green Holm, and between the two is the Sound of Green Holms. Eastward is a strait called Fall of Warness between Muckle Green Holm and the much larger island of Eday.

Muckle Green Holm has a great cormorant colony and a population of European otters.

== Tidal power ==
The Fall of Warness has strong tidal currents suitable for tidal power.

Starting in 2007, the European Marine Energy Centre installed tidal power testing equipment.

In 2021, Orbital Marine Power installed a tidal turbine called Orbital O2 that supplies 2MW to the electrical grid.

== See also ==
List of Orkney islands
