= List of Sites of Special Scientific Interest in Orkney =

The following is a list of Sites of Special Scientific Interest in the Orkney Area of Search. For other areas, see List of SSSIs by Area of Search.

- Auskerry
- Bay of Skaill
- Calf of Eday
- Central Sanday, Sanday
- Copinsay
- Cruaday Quarry, Mainland
- Den Wick, Mainland
- Doomy and Whitemaw Hill, Eday
- East Sanday Coast, Sanday
- Eynhallow
- Faray and Holm of Faray
- Glims Moss and Durkadale, Mainland
- Holm of Papa Westray
- Hoy
- Keelylang Hill and Swartabeck Burn, Mainland
- Loch of Banks, Mainland
- Loch of Isbister and The Loons, Mainland
- Lochs of Harray and Stenness, Mainland
- Marwick Head, Mainland
- Mill Bay, Stronsay
- Mill Loch, Eday
- Muckle and Little Green Holm (Muckle Green Holm & Little Green Holm)
- Muckle Head and Selwick, Hoy
- North Hill, Papa Westray
- Northwall, Sanday
- Orphir and Stenness Hills, Mainland
- Pentland Firth Islands (Swona and Muckle Skerry)
- Rousay
- Stromness Heaths and Coast, Mainland
- Sule Skerry
- Sule Stack
- Switha
- Ward Hill Cliffs, South Ronaldsay
- Waulkmill
- West Mainland Moorlands, Mainland
- West Westray, Westray
