= North Wall =

North Wall or Northwall may refer to:

- North Wall, Dublin, an inner city area in Ireland
- North Wall railway station, a freight yard complex and former railway station in Dublin, Ireland
- North Wall, Lincolnshire, a tidal defence wall in Grimsby, England
- North Wall Arts Centre, in Oxford, England
- Northwall, a site on Sanday, see List of Sites of Special Scientific Interest in Orkney
- Northwall Firn, a glacier now split in two,
  - East Northwall Firn, a glacier in Papua province, Indonesia
  - West Northwall Firn, a glacier in Papua province, Indonesia
- TSS North Wall (1883), a twin-screwed steamer cargo ship
- The North Wall, a war memorial in Ontario, Canada

== See also ==
- North face (disambiguation)
