= Backaland =

Coordinates: 59.157°N 2.759°W

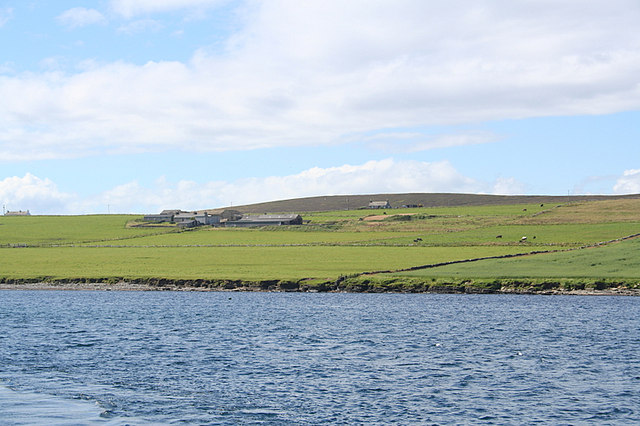
- A farm overlooking the Bay of Backaland, Eday

- Location within Orkney
- OS grid reference: HY565302
- Civil parish: Eday and Pharay
- Council area: Orkney
- Lieutenancy area: Orkney
- Country: Scotland
- Sovereign state: United Kingdom
- Post town: ORKNEY
- Postcode district: KW17
- Dialling code: 01856
- Police: Scotland
- Fire: Scottish
- Ambulance: Scottish
- UK Parliament: Orkney and Shetland
- Scottish Parliament: Orkney

Backaland is a settlement on the island of Eday in Orkney, Scotland. The settlement is also within the parish of Eday, and it is located to the south west of the island. Backaland is situated at the southern end of the B9063.
