= Norman Miller Johnson =

Scottish minister and academic author

The Rev Norman Miller Johnson FRSE FSA Scot FEIS (1887–1949) was a Scottish minister and academic author.

== Life ==
He studied at Manchester University where he gained a BSc. Concentrating on education he spent most of his life as Headmaster of Dunfermline Public School.

In 1939 he was elected a Fellow of the Royal Society of Edinburgh. His proposers were James Wright, Henry Smith Holden, Alexander Condie Stephen, James Ernest Richey and James Livingstone Begg.

He retrained in later life as a minister.

He died at the manse at Eday on Orkney on 1 December 1949.

== Publications ==
- A Brief Guide to Dunfermline Abbey (1933)
