= Eday =

Island in the Orkney Islands, Scotland

Iadaigh (Gaelic); Aidee (Scots)
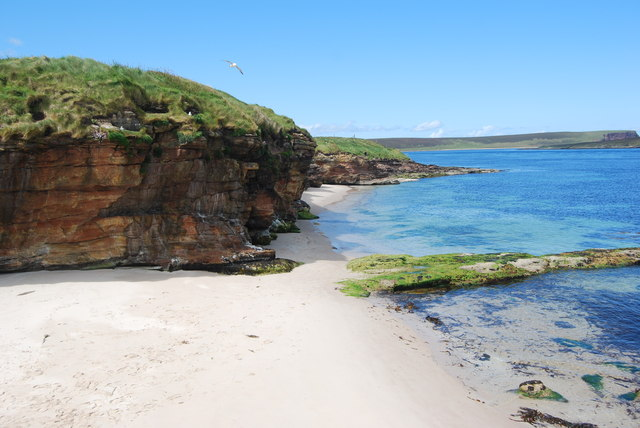
- One of Eday's beaches, with sea caves adjacent to the southern end of Calf Sound

Location
- Eday shown within Orkney
- OS grid reference: HY560338
- Coordinates: 59.172°N 2.783°W

Name
- Name meaning: Old Norse for "isthmus island"
- Old Norse name: Eiðøy

Physical geography
- Island group: Orkney
- Area: 2,745 ha (6,780 acres)
- Area rank: 31
- Highest elevation: Ward Hill 101 m (331 ft)

Administration
- Council area: Orkney Islands
- Country: Scotland
- Sovereign state: United Kingdom

Demographics
- Population: 102
- Population rank: 45
- Population density: 3.7 people/km^{2}
- Largest settlement: Backaland
- Calf of Eday Lighthouse; Calf Sound
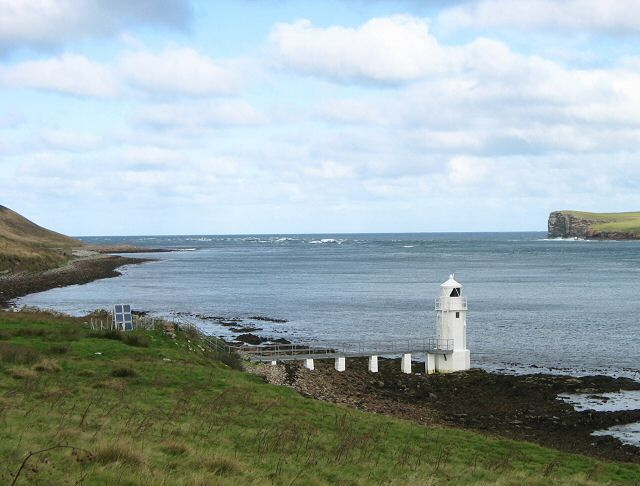
- Lighthouse on Calf Sound, Eday. The land on the upper right of the picture is the northern tip of the Calf of Eday.
- Coordinates: 59.236906°N 2.763399°W
- Constructed: 1909 (first)
- Foundation: concrete base
- Construction: aluminium tower
- Automated: 2002
- Height: 9 m (30 ft)
- Shape: octagonal prism tower with balcony and lantern
- Markings: white tower and lantern
- Power source: solar power
- Operator: Northern Lighthouse Board
- First lit: 2002 (current)
- Focal height: 9 m (30 ft)
- Range: 8 nmi (15 km; 9.2 mi) (white), 6 nmi (11 km; 6.9 mi) (red, green)
- Characteristic: Fl (3) WRG 10 s

Eday (/ˈiːdiː/, Scots: Aidee) is one of the islands of Orkney, which are located to the north of the Scottish mainland. One of the North Isles, Eday is about 24 kilometres (13 nautical miles) from the Orkney Mainland. With an area of 27 km^{2} (10 sq mi), it is the ninth-largest island of the archipelago. The bedrock of the island is Old Red Sandstone, which is exposed along the sea-cliffs.

There are various well-preserved Neolithic tombs, as well as evidence of Bronze Age settlement and the remains of a Norse-era castle. During the period of Scottish rule the substantial property of Carrick House was developed at Calfsound, which became a burgh for a short period. During the British era many agricultural improvements were introduced, although there has been a substantial decline in the population since the mid-nineteenth century. In the twenty-first century the Eday Partnership has had success in promoting the island's economy. Local placenames reflect the diverse linguistic heritage and the landscapes of the island and its surrounding seas attract abundant wildlife.

== Etymology ==
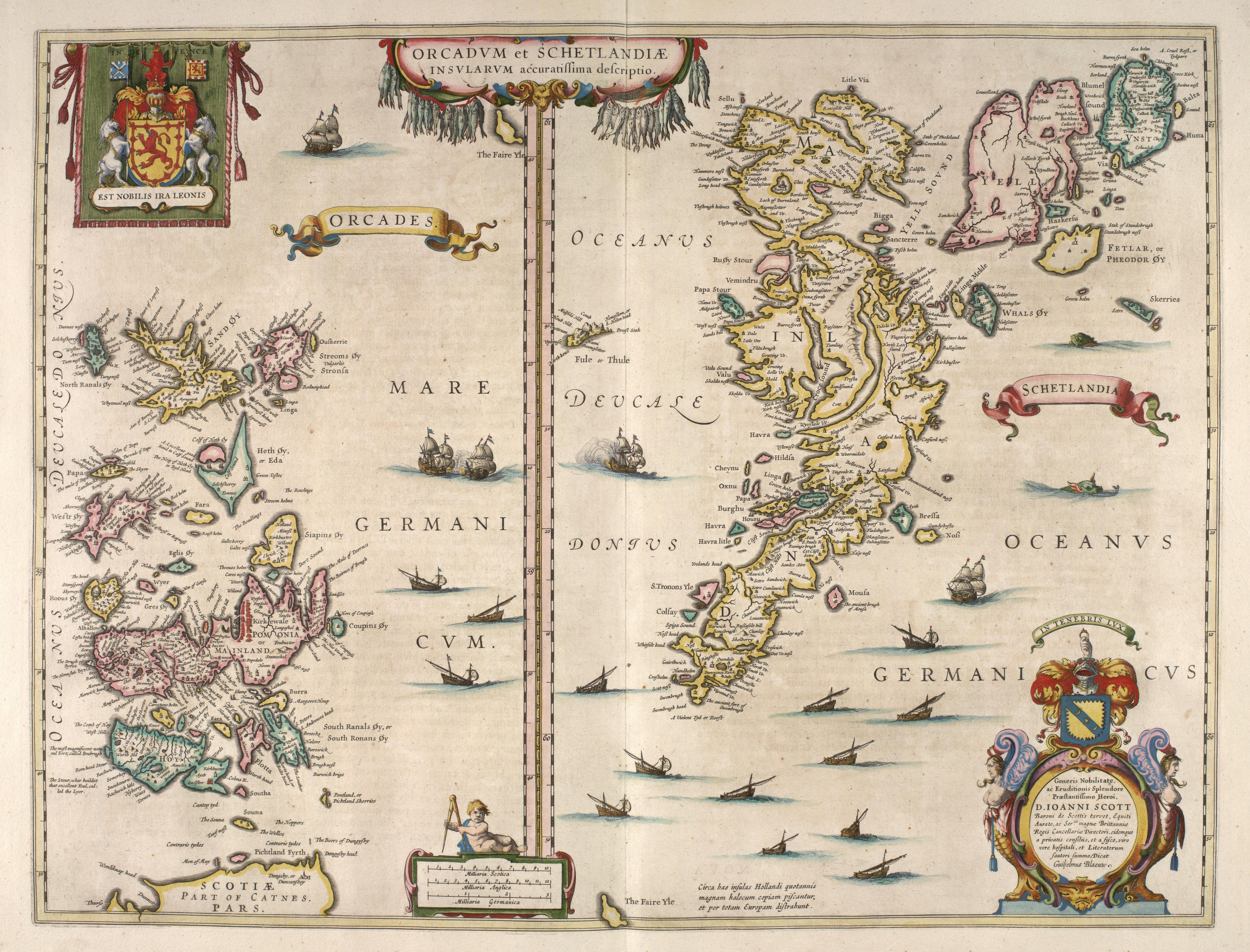
Johan Blaeu's 1654 map of Orkney and Shetland. Note that the "Calf of Heth Øy" has been transposed from its true position north east of Eday to the west.

"Eday" is a name derived from the Old Norse eið and means "isthmus island". This is a name specifically associated with economic activity used only where the isthmus has been a "route for the movement of goods and/or boats from one coast to another".

There are numerous other eið names in the islands of the North Atlantic and those in Orkney include Hoxa (Haugeið) on South Ronaldsay, Aith (found on Walls, Stronsay and the west Mainland) and Scapa in St Ola which is derived from the Norse Skálpeið. Bay of Doomy, near the central isthmus on Eday, may also have a name derived from dómr-eið, meaning "isthmus of the courthouse", indicating it could have been an important meeting place during the Norse period of Scottish history. In the 17th century Eday was also known as "Heth Øy".

In common with elsewhere in the Orkney islands, place names are generally a mixture of Norse, Scots and English influences. Any Pictish names that existed before the arrival of Scandinavian settlers on Eday appear to have been obliterated. The common suffix -quoy is from the Old Norse kví-ló and signifies an enclosure in a marshy area. Skaill on the east coast is from the Norse skáli and suggests an important farm on good fertile land that was associated with several smaller tunships. The Bay of London also has Norse origins, lund-inn meaning "woodland", although this is no longer an apt description for this largely treeless landscape.

Orkney was Christianised before the arrival of Viking settlers, and there are various local "Papa" names that reflect the activities of the pre-Norse papar monks there. The farm of Papleyhouse near Linkataing may indicate such a link to the past, although the connection is by no means certain. (Note: The history of the papar is obscure. The Landnámabók states that these Christian settlers had already colonised Iceland before the coming of the Norse. The anonymous author of the Historia Norvegiae, which may date from the 13th century, claimed that "they were Africans adhering to Judaism".) The name "geo", which occurs frequently around the rocky coast, is from the Norse gjá and means a narrow and deep cleft in the face of a cliff.

== Geography and geology ==
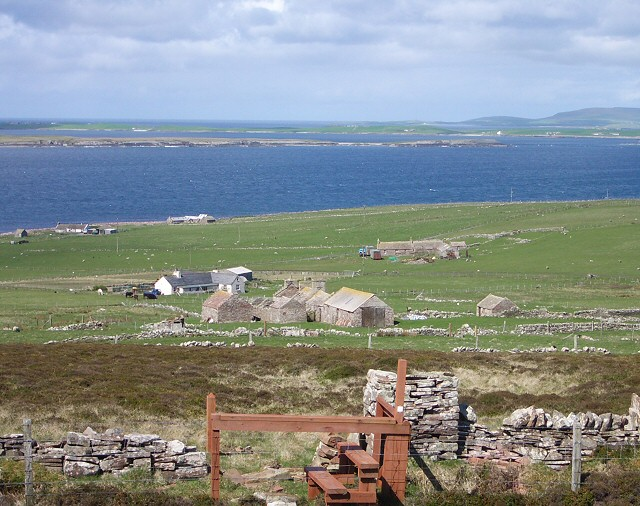
Looking from Vinquoy Hill towards Westray

Eday is 14 kilometres (8 1/2 mi) long from north to south but only just over 500 metres wide at the narrow neck of land between the Sands of Doomy and Bay of London and has been described as being "nipped at the waist". The centre of the island is largely moorland covered with heather, and cultivation is confined to the coasts.

The highest points are Flaughton Hill at the island's centre, Fersness Hill at West Side, Vinquoy Hill to the north and Ward Hill to the south, which reaches 101 metres (331 ft). In Orkney this last name, which derives from the Norse varði, is a common one for the highest point on an island as in the past they were used for lighting warning beacons.

The largest body of water is the ten-hectare (25-acre) sea southeast of Vinquoy Hill. Loch of Doomy lies on the western side of the narrow "waist" and the smaller Loch Carrick on the north coast.

The population is dispersed along the coastal farmsteads and nowhere on the island has the status of a village. Calfsound is the most populous of the settled areas, with other concentrations at Millbounds on the east coast, which has a post office and a community facility in a converted chapel, and Backaland in the south where the ferry from the Mainland docks.

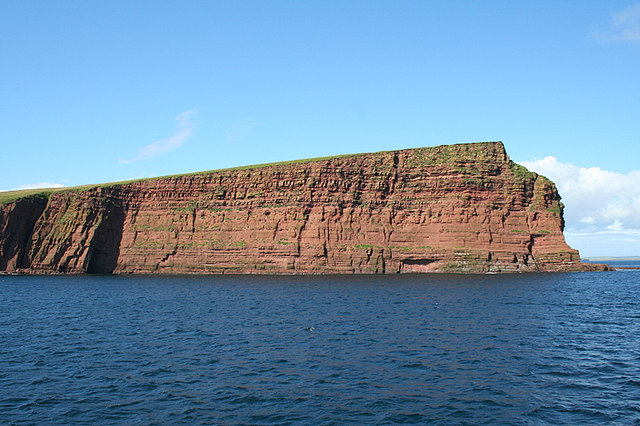
Exposure of Old Red Sandstone: Red Head at the north end of Eday. The lower and steeper part of the cliff is formed of Middle Eday Sandstone, whereas the upper less steep part is formed of Eday Marl

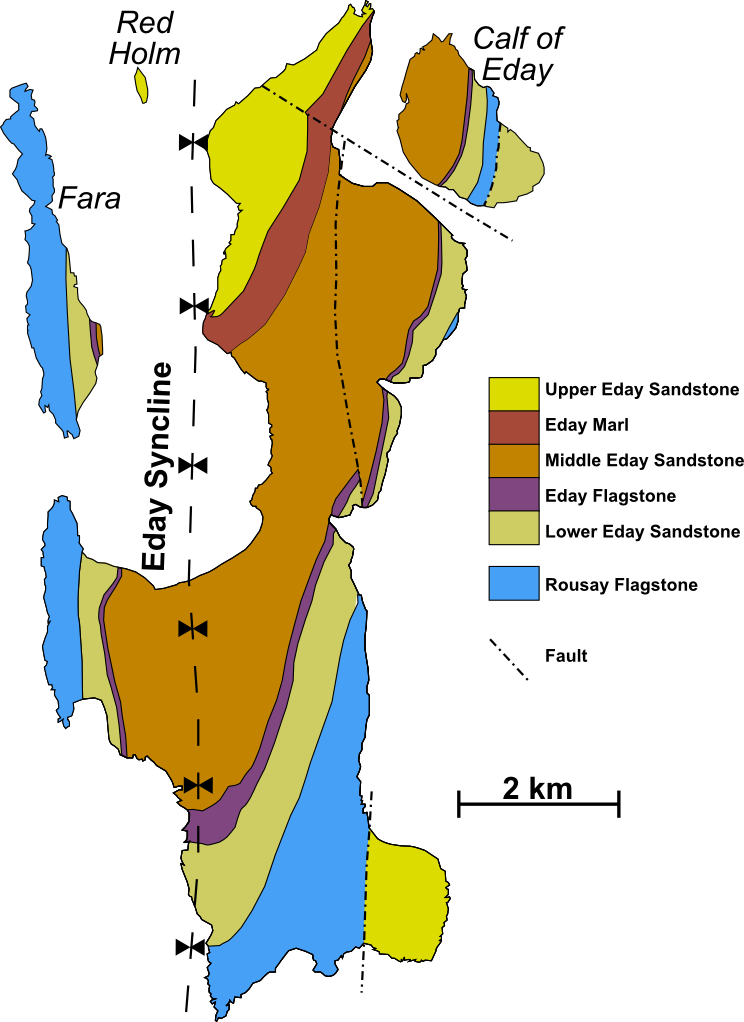
Geological map of Eday and neighbouring islands

Eday is surrounded by other small islands that make up the "seemingly impossible green and russet jigsaw of Orkney's North Isles". Calf of Eday lies 350 metres (1,100 ft) north of the settlement of Calfsound. Further east is Sanday across the Eday Sound. Stronsay and Linga Holm are to the south east and Muckle Green Holm to the south west beyond the straits known as the Fall of Warness. Egilsay lies some five kilometres (2 1/2 nmi) due west. Rusk Holm, Faray and Holm of Faray lie beyond the Sound of Faray to the northwest, and beyond them is the larger island of Westray.

In common with its neighbouring isles, Eday is largely formed from Middle Devonian Old Red Sandstone deposited in the Orcadian Basin. The Eday Group is the name for a substantial sequence of sandstones that is found at many locations in Orkney, for which Eday and the area around Eday Sound are the type area. In places it is up to 800 metres (2,600 ft) thick, and is largely composed of yellow and red sandstones with intervening grey flagstones and marls. The rock is easily quarried and some of the yellow sandstones from Fersness were used in the construction of St Magnus Cathedral in Kirkwall. The Devonian sequence is deformed into a major fold, the north–south trending Eday Syncline, with the youngest part of the sequence, the Upper Eday Sandstone outcropping in the north of the island from Bay of Cusby to Red Head. The oldest part of the sequence, the Rousay Flagstones are found on the eastern side of the island at Bight of Milldale and from Kirk Taing to War Ness, and to the west from Sealskerry Bay to Fersness. Veness is formed of Upper Eday Sandstone downfaulted against the flagstones.

== History ==
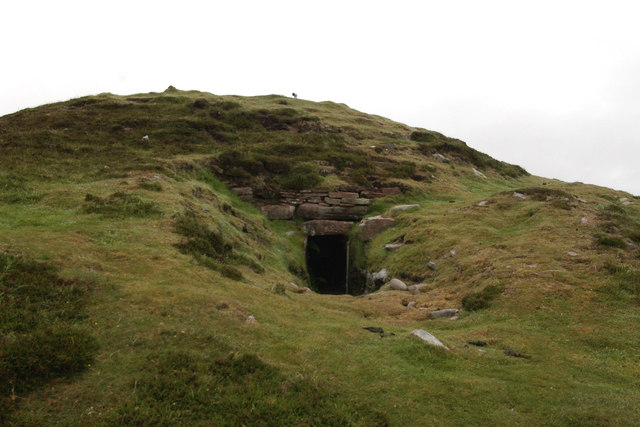
Entrance to Vinquoy chambered cairn

=== Prehistory ===
The very limited archaeological record provides scant evidence of Mesolithic life in Orkney, but the later assemblage of houses and monumental Neolithic structures in the archipelago is without parallel in the United Kingdom.

Vinquoy chambered cairn, located in a commanding position overlooking the Calf Sound, is 17 metres (56 ft) in diameter and 2.5 m (8 ft) high. The narrow entrance passage of this Maeshowe-type tomb leads to a central chamber with four side-cells. Other sites of interest on Eday include the Stone of Setter standing stone that dominates the col north of Mill Loch, and which at 4.5 m (15 ft) high is one of the tallest monoliths in Orkney. There are two more chambered cairns at Braeside and Huntersquoy and another on the Calf of Eday. Rectangular in shape, it was excavated in 1936–37 and contains a small chamber with two compartments and a larger one with four stalls that has a separate entrance and was probably added at a later date.

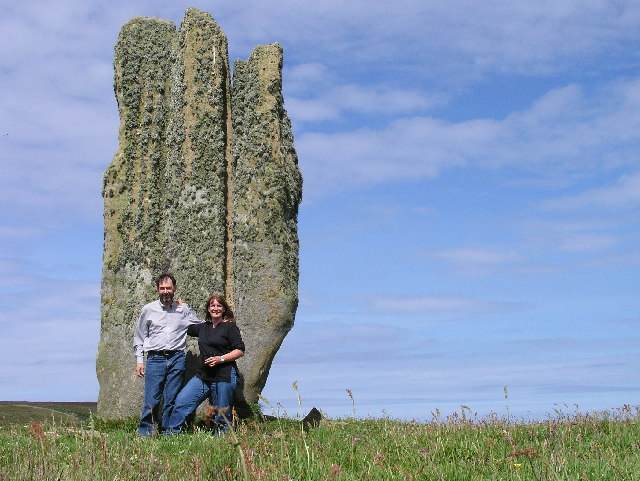
The lichen-covered Stone of Setter, which is said to resemble a giant hand.

Although there are several Bronze Age sites on the island, they provide less dramatic remains. At Warness in the south west there is a burnt mound from this period and there are the ruins of two houses of a similar age on Holm of Faray near the Point of Dogs Bones. The Fold of Setter is an 85-metre-diameter (279 ft) Bronze Age enclosure located to the north of Mill Loch. There is the site of a large Iron Age roundhouse containing a saddle quern at Linkataing in north west Eday. Latterly, Orkney was settled by the Picts although the archaeological evidence is sparse.

=== Norse colonisation ===
It is not known "when and how the Vikings conquered and occupied the Isles", and although Norse contacts with Scotland certainly predate the first written records in the 8th century, their nature and frequency are unknown. The place name evidence of a Norse presence on Eday is conclusive and very little is known about the specifics of life on the island at this time. The Norse-era ruins of the Castle of Stackel Brae, which dates from the 12th or 13th century, lie under a green mound to the east of the Bay of Greentoft. The castle may have been the most important building on Eday at this time.

=== Scottish rule ===
In 1468 Orkney became part of the Kingdom of Scotland and an influx of Scottish entrepreneurs helped to create a diverse and independent community that included farmers, fishermen and merchants that called themselves comunitatis Orcadie and who proved themselves increasingly able to defend their rights against their feudal overlords. Nonetheless, the actions of the aristocracy continue to provide much of the information known about affairs on Eday at the time. In 1561, during the Reformation, Edward Sinclair was granted the feu of Eday by Adam Bothwell, Bishop of Orkney. These were turbulent times—Sinclair's duties included to defend the reforming Bishop "against whatsoever invaders"—and later that year he was one of the ringleaders of an anti-Catholic riot in Kirkwall. (Note: The Sinclair's, descendants of Henry I Sinclair, Earl of Orkney, were a powerful force in Orkney from the 14th to the 16th century. Edward was a grandson of Oliver Sinclair of Roslin, himself a son of William Sinclair, 1st Earl of Caithness.)

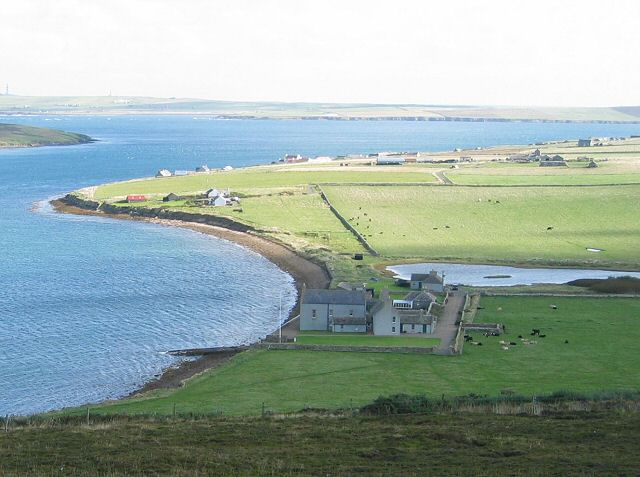
Carrick House, Calfsound, with Carrick Loch beyond and Sanday in the distance

His son William took over the running of the Eday estate in due course, but it became burdened with debt. In 1601 when Edward was "an auld decrepit man ... aged 100 or thereby" William attempted to sell the family interest to George Sinclair the Earl of Caithness. (Note: George Sinclair (1582–1643) was the Fifth Earl of Caithness.) The new proprietor sent half a dozen boatloads of "vagabondis, broken Highland men of Caithness" to Eday, much to the alarm of the notorious Earl Patrick of Orkney. Earl Patrick was able to use the poor relationship between the elderly father Edward and his son, (the former claiming William fired muskets at him and grabbed him by the neck like a dog) to take action. Acting, so he alleged, on behalf of Edward, Earl Patrick evicted William, took the Eday the rents for himself and profited from the extraction of building stone from Towback quarry.

John Stewart, Earl of Carrick, the brother of Earl Patrick, was granted Eday in 1632 (Note: John Stewart was a first cousin of James VI. He had property in Ayrshire and hankered after the prestigious title "Earl of Carrick". King James allowed him to name his Eday mansion "Carrick", enabling him to have the style, if not the substance of this title, which became extinct on his death in 1652.) and he constructed Carrick House at Calfsound shortly thereafter. He used peat to manufacture salt from salt pans at both Carrick and on the Calf of Eday. The product was described as "quite fine" in the 17th century when it was undertaken on a substantial scale although of "indifferent quality" in the early 19th century when it was being conducted as a cottage industry. Peat extraction was also an important industry in the past as Sanday and North Ronaldsay obtained most of their fuel from Eday and this material was also exported to whisky distilleries on mainland Scotland.

Stewart's ambitions for Calfsound were considerable. Described as the "town and port" of Carrick it became a burgh (the only other one in Orkney being Kirkwall) with the right to appoint baillies and hold markets but it was never likely to flourish in such a location.

=== British era ===
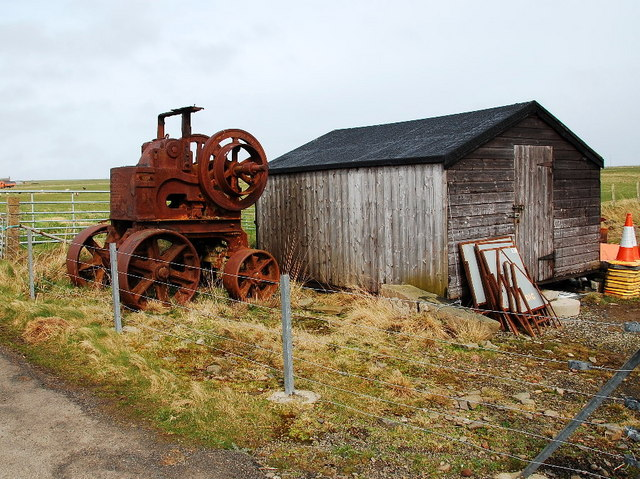
Abandoned stone-breaking equipment at Southside

From the first decade of the 18th century Orkney became part of the new Kingdom of Great Britain. This was a time of great interest in agricultural improvement although the changes this brought about were not of significance in Orkney until the mid-nineteenth century. For example, no potatoes were grown on Eday until around 1780. By comparison to these gradual changes, Carrick House saw drama in 1725. The property was now owned by James Fea who had been a school friend of a "Mr Smith", a trader of Stromness. When Smith was unmasked as the notorious pirate John Gow he sought to escape the attentions of the authorities by making for Eday via a raid on Hall of Clestrain, in Orphir. When Gow's ship Revenge ran aground on the Calf of Eday, Fea's men took him prisoner and held him at Carrick House, for which Fea was given a £1,700 reward. The bell from the Revenge is still in Carrick House.

In the early nineteenth century the kelp industry provided significant employment on some of the Orkney islands, but when the market collapsed between 1830 and 1832 it caused considerable hardship. North Ronaldsay was especially hard-hit and several families were allowed to resettle from there to develop land at Westside on Eday. Rising populations meant increasing land values, especially for small tenancies. In 1843 crofts were valued at £1 per acre (£2 1/2 per hectare) on Eday, nearly three times the price for larger farms. However, the 20th century saw decline. Immigration even from mainland Scotland was essentially unknown even in the late 1950s and the population in 2001 was about an eighth of the total 160 years earlier. In the census of 2011, it was found that 50% of the residents of the island were born in England, the most of all Scotland's islands.

Historical population

Year	Pop.	±%
1841	944	—
1881	730	−22.7%
1891	647	−11.4%
1931	430	−33.5%
1961	198	−54.0%

Year	Pop.	±%
1981	147	−25.8%
1991	166	+12.9%
2001	121	−27.1%
2011	160	+32.2%
2022	102	−36.3%

== Transport and economy ==
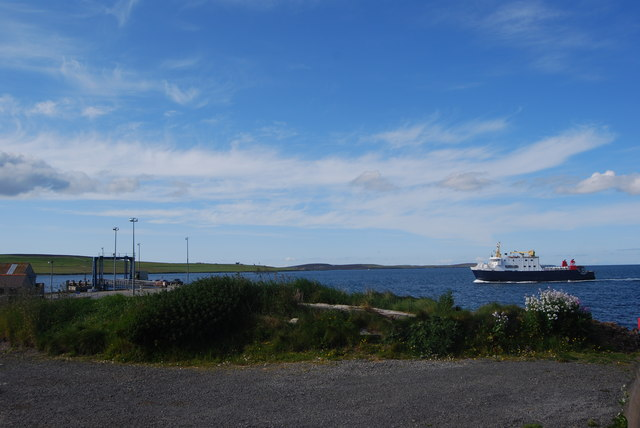
Orkney Ferries arrival at Bay of Backaland

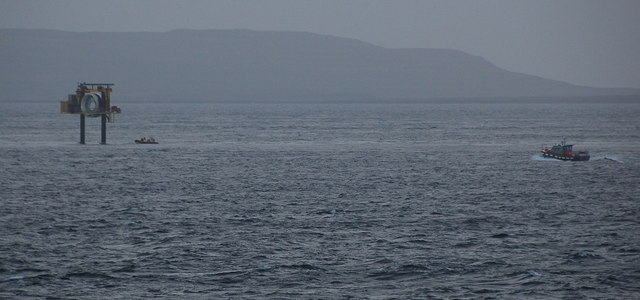
OpenHydro Open-Centre turbine being tested at the EMEC site in the Fall of Warness

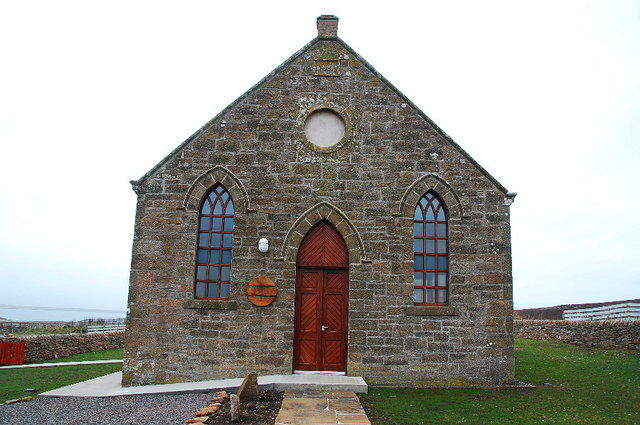
Eday Heritage and Visitor Centre in the restored former Baptist Church near Millbounds

Eday can be reached by both sea and air from the Orkney Mainland. Orkney Ferries provide daily ferry crossings to Backaland on Eday from Kirkwall. The Orkney inter-island air service, operated by Loganair, connects Kirkwall Airport with Eday London Airport. In 2014 the Orkney Islands Council began consultation to build a number of fixed crossings between seven of the Orkney Islands. This includes the possibility of a 2.6 mile bridge between Eday and Papa Westray.

Farming and crofting are mainstays of the local economy, especially livestock husbandry. Flocks of sheep are also kept on Faray.

The European Marine Energy Centre (EMEC) based at Stromness is a Scottish Government-backed research facility. They have installed a wave testing system at Billia Croo on the Orkney mainland and a tidal power testing station, overlooking the Fall of Warness, on Eday. The test site was chosen because of the marine currents that reach almost 4 m/s (7.8 kn) at spring tides. There are seven offshore testing berths connected to the 33KV North Isles section of the national grid, via an underground cable.

Eday Partnership, the local development trust is active in promoting the island's economy and has instigated numerous projects, including Eday Heritage Centre, and the purchase of a new diesel tank for the island. Eday's various community projects contributed £380,000 to the island's economy from 2005 to 2007 and a 900 kW community-owned wind turbine is planned. The income that this asset will generate is expected to reduce fuel poverty on the island, support new community enterprises and create affordable housing.

In July 2008, the island celebrated the opening of the Eday Heritage and Visitor Centre in the restored former Baptist Church. There is a heritage display area, a permanent archive, a café and a tourist information point. The Eday Oral History Project records life on the island in the past and is also housed within the centre, which has its own 6 kW wind turbine.

The island's population was 160 as recorded by the 2011 census an increase of over 30% since 2001 when there were 121 usual residents. During the same period Scottish island populations as a whole grew by 4% to 103,702.

== Natural history ==
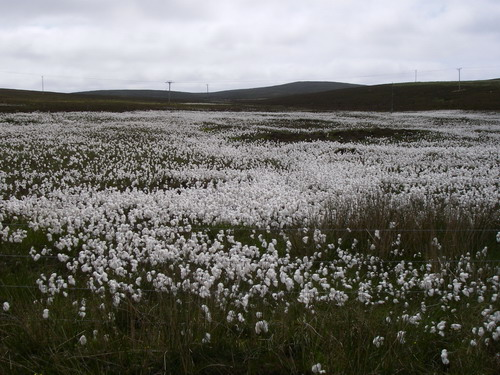
Eriophorum angustifolium, or bog cotton, by the roadside near Sandhill

In the early 19th century Patrick Neill wrote of the local flora that "Eda is a mossy island; a great part of it consisting of barren marshy heaths. Juncus uliginosus here covers whole acres; and the pretty little plant Radiola millegran, or all-seed, is everywhere strewed." (Note: Neill notes that Juncus uliginofus is also known as "little bulbous rush". The modern terminology is Juncus bulbosus. Radiola millegran is known today as Radiola linoides.) Over 120 species of wild plants have been recorded on the island, including bog myrtle found nowhere else in Orkney.

In the mid-17th century, Eday was described as being "absolutely full of moorland birds", and today there are red-throated divers on Mill Loch, Arctic skuas and bonxies on the moors and black guillemot offshore. Shore birds include meadow pipit, rock pipit and ringed plover. The woodland at Carrick House attracts a variety of migrants, and otters can be seen around the coasts. There are colonies of harbour and grey seals on Muckle Green Holm, Little Green Holm, Faray and Holm of Faray, and white-beaked dolphin, minke whale and killer whale are occasional visitors to the area. A ranger provides guided walks throughout the year.

== Prominent natives ==
- Australian pioneer union leader and Australian Labor Party politician William Spence was born on Eday in 1846.
- John Flaws Reid, who represented Mackenzie in the House of Commons of Canada, was born on Eday in 1860.
- Rev Norman Miller Johnson FRSE (1887–1949) was minister of Eday and died there.

== See also ==
- List of islands of Scotland
- List of lighthouses in Scotland
- List of Northern Lighthouse Board lighthouses
- Geology of Orkney
- Prehistoric Orkney
- Tarbert, the Gaelic equivalent of eið
