= Quoygrew settlement, Westray =

Ruins of a Viking Age settlement on the island of Westray, Orkney, Scotland

Coordinates: 59°20′19″N 2°58′48″W

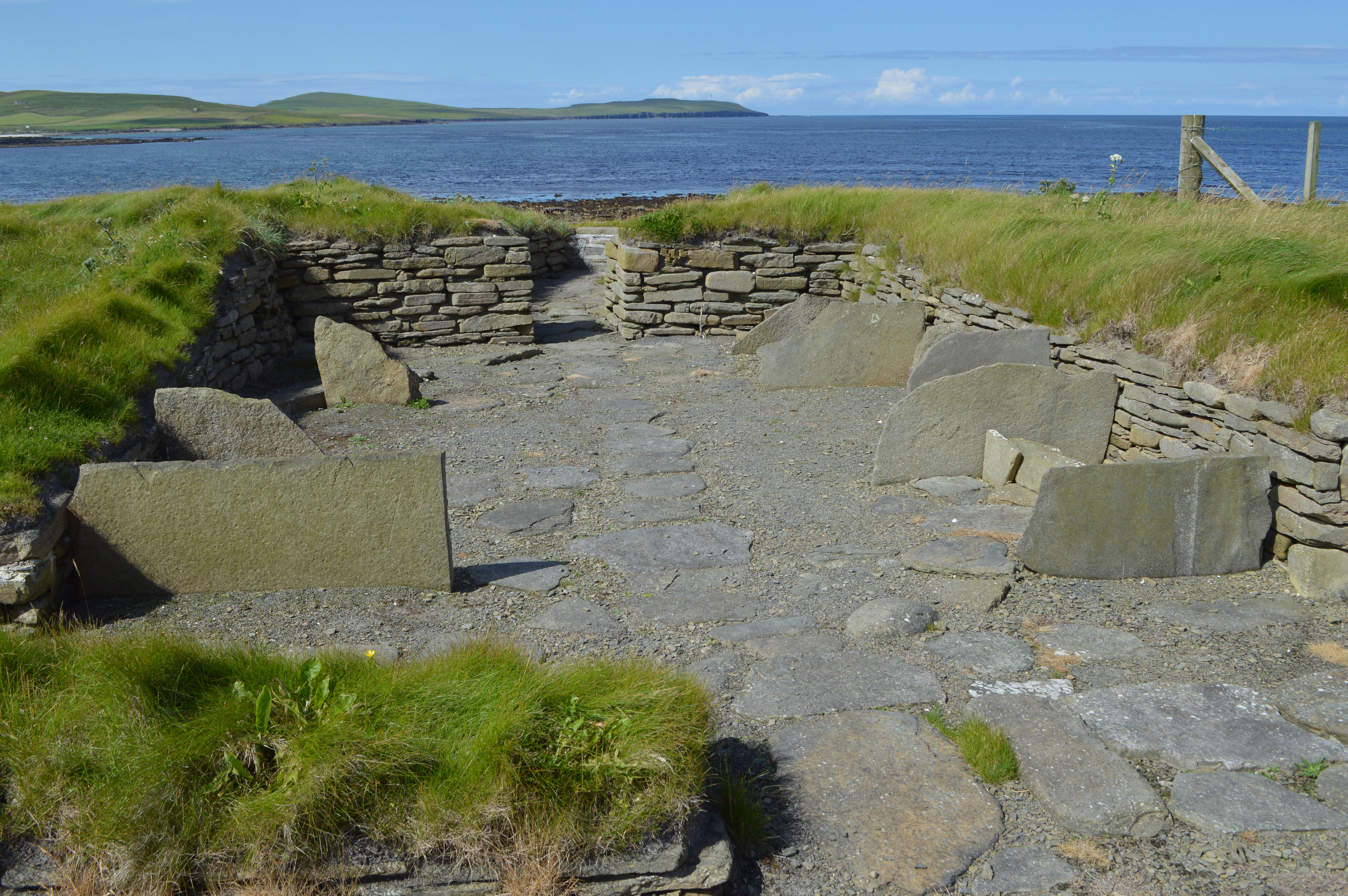
Remains of Quoygrew Norse settlement

Quoygrew, Westray is the site of a medieval Norse settlement on the island of Westray in Orkney, Scotland. Established as a small farmstead most likely between 900 and 1000 AD, and later expanded in 1200, Quoygrew includes the remains of medieval and post-medieval buildings that range in date from the 10th to the 16th centuries. The 1 hectare (2.5 acres) farmstead was continuously occupied until the early 20th century. Historic Environment Scotland established the site as a scheduled monument in 2014.

== Description ==
The ruins of the medieval settlement, also known as Nether Trenabie in the 19th century, are located on the island of Westray, in Orkney, Scotland. The settlement can be seen as two low mounds, one near the shoreline, and the other 70 m (230 ft) inland and to the east of the first mound. Historic Environment Scotland established the site as a scheduled monument in 2014. The monument comprises a 1 hectare (2.5 acres) area, and includes the remains of late Viking Age and medieval era dwellings, middens, and the remnants of a medieval soil system.

The settlement began as a small Norse farm settlement between 900 and 1000 AD. Archaeological excavations have determined that the earliest dwelling was built of turf and stone between 1000 and 1200 AD. A larger building was constructed in stone around 1200 AD on top of the earlier building. The stone building, consisted of four rooms, and was remodeled and expanded in nine different stages. The building was dismantled in 1700.

Middens excavated at the site include a fish midden found near the shoreline and a farm midden discovered inland. The coastal midden was composed of peat ash, shell and fish bone and has been dated from the 10th to the 12th centuries. A cellar with a flagstone floor and stone-lined drain, dating to the 13th century, was found to be dug into the midden. The farm midden was found beneath a 19th-century croft which was abandoned in the 1930s. It consisted of a top layer of garden soil and separate layers of fish bone, shell, and mammal bone, including the skulls of cattle and horse bone. The radiocarbon dating of fragmentary bone date the midden from 1004 to 1262 AD. Pottery sherds, antler pins and antler combs were also found in both middens.

== See also ==
- Scotland in the Early Middle Ages
- Scandinavian Scotland
- The Norse settlement at Jarlshof, Shetland Islands
