= Holm of Faray =

Island in Orkney, Scotland

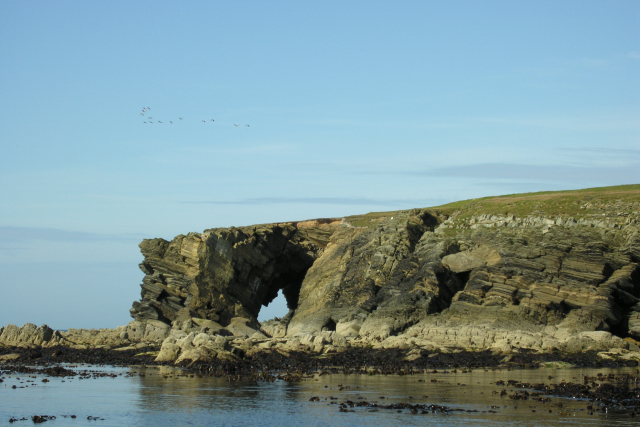
- Natural arch at northern point of Holm of Faray

Location
- Holm of Faray shown within Orkney
- OS grid reference: HY526386
- Coordinates: 59.23°N 2.83°W

Physical geography
- Island group: Orkney

Administration
- Council area: Orkney Islands
- Country: Scotland
- Sovereign state: United Kingdom

Demographics
- Population: 0

The Holm of Faray is a small island in Orkney, Scotland, near Faray and Westray, which it lies between. Together with its neighbour Faray, it is designated a SSSI due to its importance as a haul-out site and breeding area for grey seals.

== Geography and geology ==
Holm of Faray is made up of red sandstone. It is effectively a continuation of Faray, but separated from it by Lavey Sound. It has a "head" and a "torso", which are created by East Bight and West Bight, which almost create a separate islet. It is 16 m (52 ft) at its highest point.

It is on the west side of the Sound of Faray, which separates it from tiny Red Holm, and the North Ayre on Eday which is 1.2 miles (1.9 km) away. It is separated from Westray by Rapness Sound in the west (an extension of Westray Firth) and Weatherness Sound to the north.
