= Humber =

Large tidal estuary in north-east England

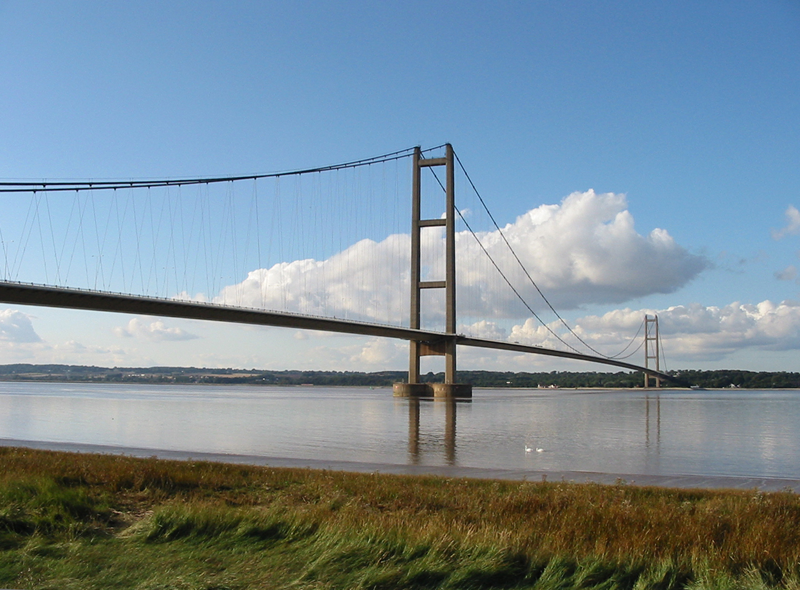
- The Humber Bridge viewed from the south-east

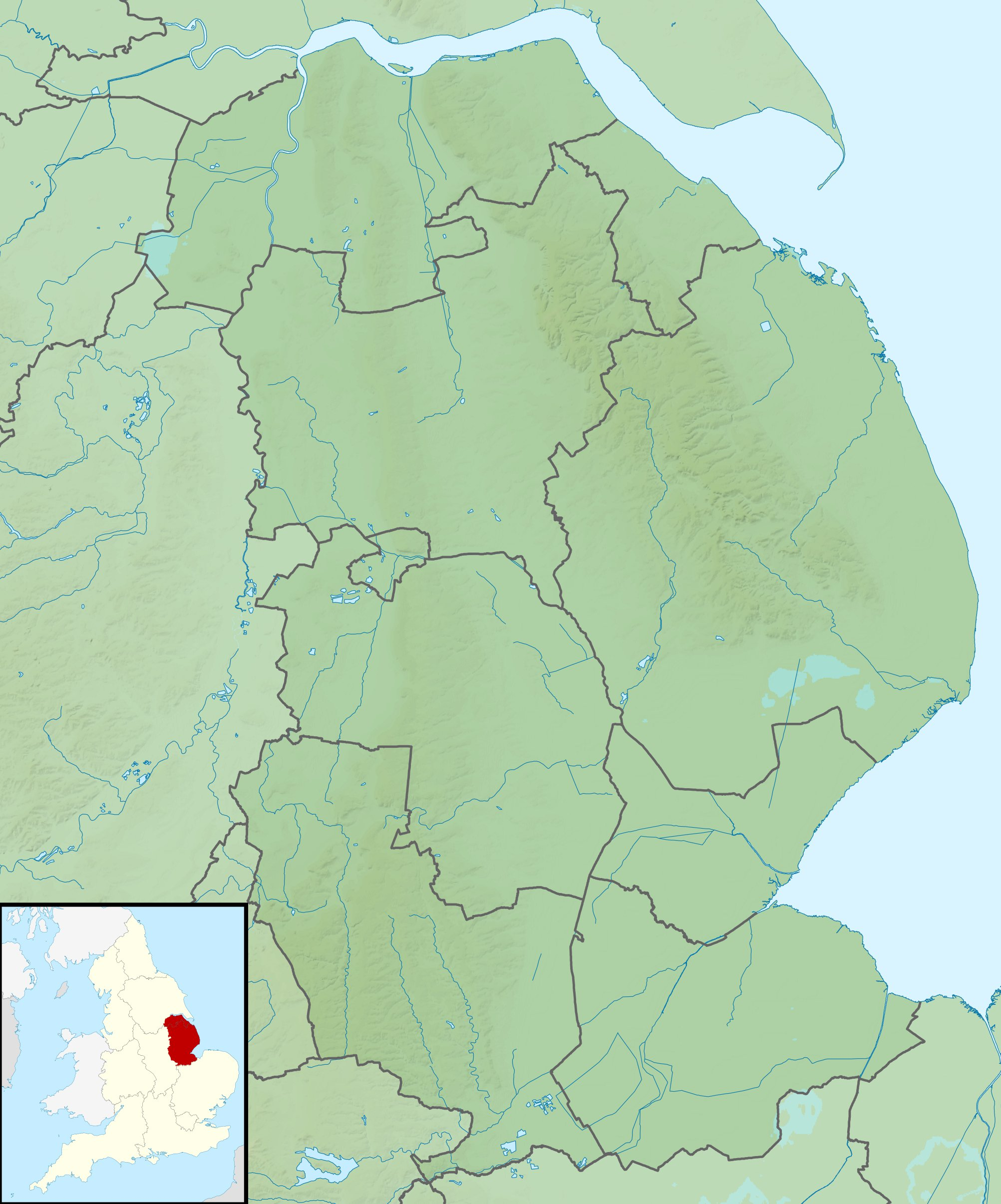
- Mouth of the Humber

Location
- Country: England
- Counties: East Riding of Yorkshire; Lincolnshire
- Cities: Kingston upon Hull
- Towns: Brough, Grimsby, Immingham, Barton upon Humber, Cleethorpes

Physical characteristics
- Source
  - location: Trent Falls
  - coordinates: 53.7008°N 0.6911°W
- Mouth
  - location: North Sea, between Spurn Head
  - coordinates: 53.5427°N 0.0923°E
- Length: 38.5 mi (62.0 km)
- Basin size: 24,240 km^{2} (9,360 sq mi)
- Discharge
  - location: freshwater inflow
  - average: 250 m^{3}/s (8,800 cu ft/s)
  - maximum: 1,500 m^{3}/s (53,000 cu ft/s)

Basin features
- Tributaries
  - left: River Ouse, River Hull
  - right: River Trent, River Ancholme, River Freshney
- Designation

Ramsar Wetland
- Official name: Humber Estuary
- Designated: 28 July 1994
- Reference no.: 663

The Humber /ˈhʌmbər/ is a large tidal estuary on the east coast of Northern England. It is formed at Trent Falls, Faxfleet, by the confluence of the tidal rivers Ouse and Trent. From there to the North Sea, it forms part of the boundary between the East Riding of Yorkshire on the north bank and North Lincolnshire on the south bank. Also known as the River Humber, it is tidal its entire length.

Below Trent Falls, the Humber passes the junction with the Market Weighton Canal on the north shore, the confluence of the River Ancholme on the south shore; between North Ferriby and South Ferriby and under the Humber Bridge; between Barton-upon-Humber on the south bank and Kingston upon Hull on the north bank (where the River Hull joins), then meets the North Sea between Cleethorpes on the Lincolnshire side and the long and thin headland of Spurn Head to the north.

Ports on the Humber include the Port of Hull, the Port of Grimsby and the Port of Immingham; there are lesser ports at New Holland and North Killingholme Haven. The estuary is navigable for the largest of deep-sea vessels. Inland connections for smaller craft are extensive but handle only a quarter of the goods traffic handled in the Thames.

== Names ==
There are numerous theories for how the hydronym of Humber is derived from Celtic or Pre-Celtic languages. For example, it may be a Brittonic formation containing -[a]mb-ṛ, a variant of the element *amb meaning "moisture", with the prefix *hu- meaning "good, well" (cf. Welsh hy-, in Hywel, etc).

The first element may also be *hū-, with connotations of "seethe, boil, soak", of which a variant forms the name of the adjoining River Hull.

The estuary appears in some Latin sources as Abus, and was recorded in the 2nd century AD by Ptolemy as Ábou. This is derived from an early Celtic *ābo-, meaning "moving water". Also suggested is a Latinisation of the Celtic form Aber (Welsh for river mouth or estuary) but is erroneously given as a name for both the Humber and The Ouse as one continuous watercourse.

== Geography ==
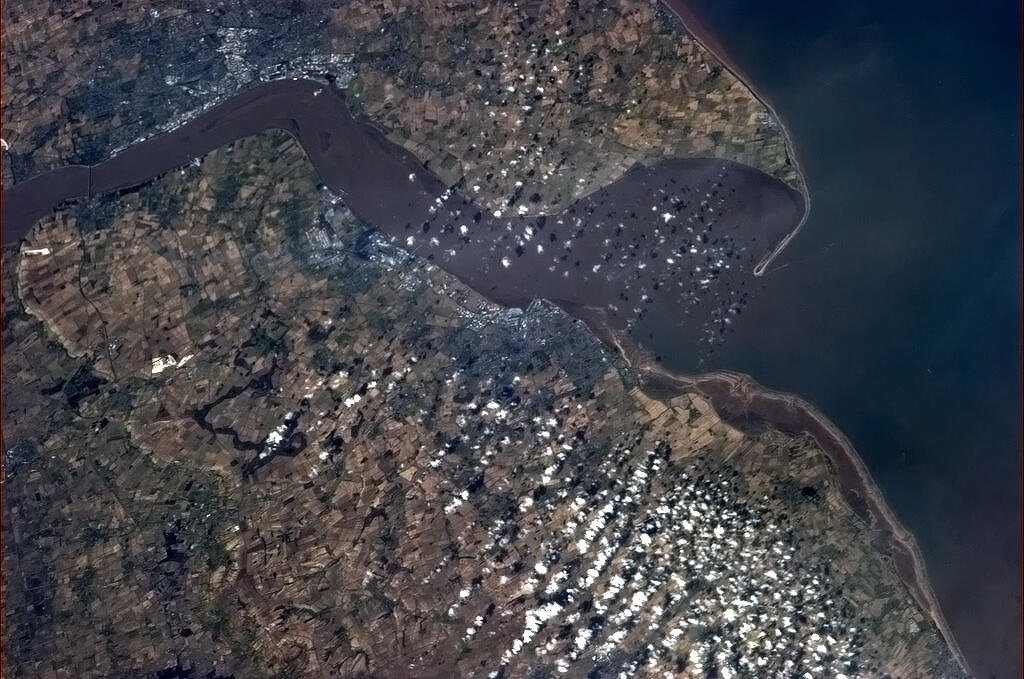
The Humber from the International Space Station

Although it is now an estuary its entire length, the Humber had a much longer freshwater course during the Ice Age, extending across Doggerland, which is now submerged beneath the North Sea.

== History ==
The Humber features regularly in medieval British literature. In the Welsh Triads, the Humber is (together with the Thames and the River Severn) one of the three principal rivers of Britain, and is continually mentioned throughout the Brut y Brenhinedd as a boundary between the southern kingdom (Lloegyr) and various northern kingdoms. In Geoffrey of Monmouth's 12th-century historically unreliable chronicle (Historia Regum Britanniae), the Humber is named for "Humber the Hun", an invader who drowned there during battle in the earliest days of the chronicle.

The Humber remained an important boundary throughout the Anglo-Saxon period, separating Northumbria from the southern kingdoms. The name Northumbria derives from the Anglo-Saxon Norðhymbre (plural) = "the people north of the Humber".

The Humber is recorded with the abbreviation Fl. Abi (The Abus river, Ancient Greek: Ἄβος) in Ptolemy's Geographia, discharging into the German Ocean (the North Sea) south of Ocelum Promontorium (Spurn Head). Ptolemy also gives the Iron Age tribes of the area as the Coritani south of the Humber and the Parisi to the north.

On 23 August 1921, the British airship R38 crashed into the estuary near Hull, killing 44 of the 49 crew on board.

== Governance ==
Until 1974 the Humber formed part of the boundary between the traditional counties of Yorkshire and Lincolnshire, as well as their large subdivisions the East Riding of Yorkshire and Parts of Lindsey (which were administrative counties in their own right from 1889 to 1974, along with the city of Kingston Upon Hull and the county borough of Grimsby). From 1974 to 1996, the areas now known as the East Riding of Yorkshire, North Lincolnshire and North East Lincolnshire constituted the county of Humberside. The Humber, from 1996, forms a boundary between the East Riding of Yorkshire (to the north) and North Lincolnshire and North East Lincolnshire, to the south.

== Fortifications ==
The Humber Forts were built in the mouth of the estuary for the First World War. Planned in 1914, their construction started in 1915 and they were not completed until 1919. A coastal battery at Easington, Fort Goodwin or Kilnsea Battery, faced the Bull Sands Fort. They were also garrisoned during the Second World War, and were finally abandoned for military use in 1956.

Fort Paull is further upstream, a Napoleonic-era emplacement replaced in the early 20th century by Stallingborough Battery opposite Sunk Island.

== Crossings ==
The Humber Bridge was the longest single-span suspension bridge in the world from its construction in 1981 until 1998. As of June 2026, it is the seventeenth longest.

Before the bridge was built, a series of paddle steamers operated from the Corporation Pier railway station at the Victoria Pier in Hull to the railway pier in New Holland. Steam ferries started in 1841, and in 1848 were purchased by the Manchester, Sheffield and Lincolnshire Railway. They, and their successors, ran the ferry until the bridge opened in 1981. Railway passenger and car traffic continued to use the pier until the end of ferry operations.

The line of the bridge is similar to an ancient ferry route from Hessle to Barton upon Humber, which is noted in the Domesday Book and in a charter of 1281. The ferry was recorded as still operating in 1856, into the railway era. The Humber was then one mile (1.6 km) across.

=== Foot ===
Graham Boanas, a Hull man, is believed to be the first man to succeed in wading across the Humber since ancient Roman times. The feat in August 2005 was attempted to raise cash and awareness for the medical research charity, DebRA. He started his trek on the north bank at Brough; four hours later, he emerged on the south bank at Whitton. He is 6 feet 9 inches (2.06 m) tall and took advantage of a very low tide. He replicated this achievement on the television programme Top Gear (Series 10 Episode 6) when he beat James May who drove an Alfa Romeo 159 around the inland part of the estuary in a race without using the Humber Bridge.

=== Swimming ===
On Saturday 26 August 1911, Alice Maud Boyall became the first recorded woman to swim the Humber. Boyall, then aged 19 and living in Hull, was the Yorkshire swimming champion. She crossed the Humber from Hull to New Holland Pier swimming the distance in 50 minutes, 6 minutes slower than the existing men's record.

Since 2011, Warners Health have organised the 'Warners Health Humber Charity Business Swim'. Twelve swimmers from companies across the Yorkshire region train and swim in an ellipse from the south bank to the north bank of the estuary under the Humber Bridge over a total distance of approximately 1 1/2 miles (2.4 km). Since then, an organised group crossing at the Humber Bridge has become an annual event, with a small number of pre-selected swimmers crossing in a 'pod' which remains close together, in aid of Humber Rescue.

In 2019, Hull-based competitive open water swimmer Richard Royal became the first person to attempt and complete a two-way swim across the estuary, beginning and finishing at Hessle foreshore, with Barton on the south bank as the mid-way point, fulfilling the land-to-land criteria, covering a total of 4,085 m (4,467 yd). Royal holds the record for the fastest one-way swim across the Humber (35 minutes 11 seconds) and the fastest two-way swim (1 hour, 13 minutes, 46 seconds), certified by Guinness World Records and the World Open Water Swimming Association. He raised over £900 for Humber Rescue, who provided safety support during the swim.

== Ecology ==
The Humber is home both to resident fish and those returning from the sea to their spawning grounds in Yorkshire, Lincolnshire and Derbyshire. Salmon, sole, cod, eel, flounder, plaice, sprat, lamprey and sand goby have all been caught within the estuary. It is also used by over-wintering birds, is a good breeding ground for bitterns, marsh harriers, little terns and avocets, and forms part of the Severn-Trent flyway, a route used by migratory birds to cross Great Britain.

In 2019 the Yorkshire Wildlife Trust and the University of Hull re-introduced the river oyster into the Humber after a sixty-year absence.

== In popular culture ==
Andrew Marvell's 1682 poem To His Coy Mistress refers to the Humber.

In the 1719 novel Robinson Crusoe by Daniel Defoe, Crusoe leaves England on a ship departing from the Humber.

== See also ==
- Industry of the South Humber Bank
- North Wall, Lincolnshire
- Humber, the name of one of the sea areas of the British Shipping Forecast.
- Lagoon Hull

=== Navigable tributaries and connections ===
- River Hull
- River Trent
- River Ouse, Yorkshire
- River Don, South Yorkshire
- Aire and Calder Navigation
- River Ancholme
- Market Weighton Canal
