= North face =

North face or Northface or The North Face may refer to:

- North face (Eiger), in the Bernese Alps in Switzerland
- North Face (Everest), in Himalaya, usually traversed ascending Everest from the north
- North face (Fairview Dome), a climbing route in Yosemite National Park, US
- North face (Grand Teton), a climbing route in Wyoming, US
- North face (Grandes Jorasses), in the Mont Blanc massif
- North Face (film), 2008 German historical fiction film
- Northface University, in Utah, US
- Northface (horse), a Canadian Thoroughbred
- "Northface", a song from the album T2: Kontrakultur by Timbuktu
- The North Face, an American outdoor product company
- North Face (novel), by Mary Renault

== See also ==
- Great north faces of the Alps
- North Wall (disambiguation)
