= North Wall, Lincolnshire =

Coordinates: 53.6004°N 0.1285°W

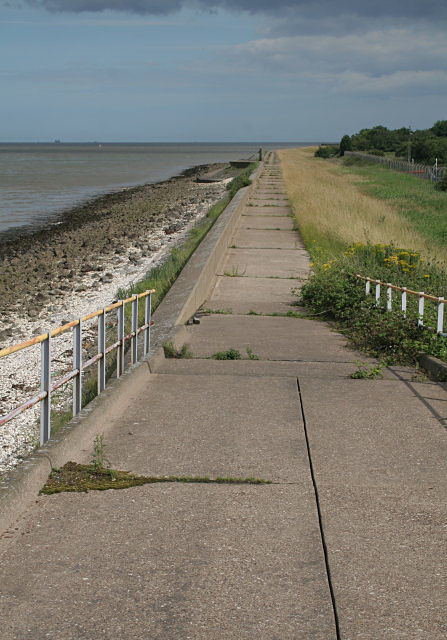
Sea wall walkway at Immingham

The North Wall is a tidal defence wall which runs for several miles along the banks of the river Humber from Moody Lane in Grimsby along the coast to the offshore oil depot at Immingham. It has factories along one side.

In June 2023, the site was the scene of public discord owing to access rights for the public along the wall.
