= Calf of Eday =

Island in Orkney, Scotland

Cauf o Aidee (Scots)
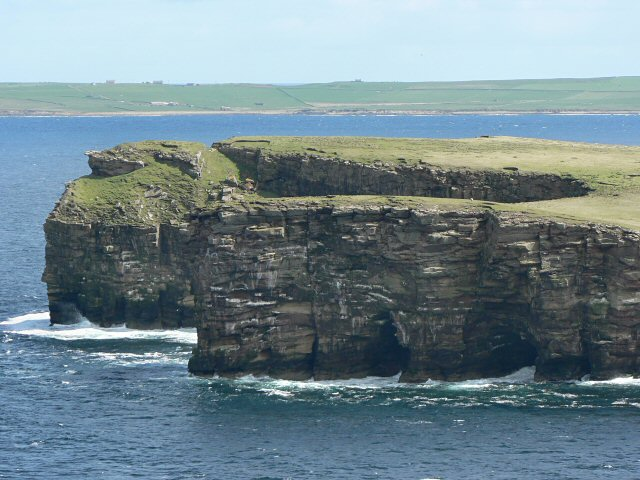
- Grey Head, the northern tip of the Calf. Sea caves, and the beginning of an arch can be seen in the cliff.

Location
- Calf of Eday shown within the Orkney Islands
- OS grid reference: HY580393
- Coordinates: 59.23°N 02.73°W

Name
- Old Norse name: Kalfr

Physical geography
- Island group: Orkney
- Area: 243 hectares (0.94 sq mi)
- Area rank: 98
- Highest elevation: The Graand 54 metres (177 ft)

Administration
- Council area: Orkney Islands
- Country: Scotland
- Sovereign state: United Kingdom

Demographics
- Population: 0

The Calf of Eday (Scots: Cauf o Aidee; Old Norse: Kalfr) is an uninhabited island in Orkney, Scotland, lying north east of Eday. It is known for its wildlife and its prehistoric ruins.

== History ==
There is a Neolithic chambered cairn in the southwest overlooking Calf Sound, which separates the island from Eday. Rectangular in shape, the cairn was excavated in 1936–37 and contains a small chamber with two compartments and a larger one with four stalls that has a separate entrance and was probably added at a later date. Two similar structures have been identified nearby along with various other ancient ruins.

From the 17th to the 19th centuries, the Calf of Eday was home to a salt works, the remains of which can still be seen to the north of cairns.

The pirate John Gow and his men successfully raided the Hall of Clestrain on 10 February 1725, but when they attempted to attack Carrick House on Eday, they ran aground on the Calf of Eday, where they were captured.

== Etymology ==
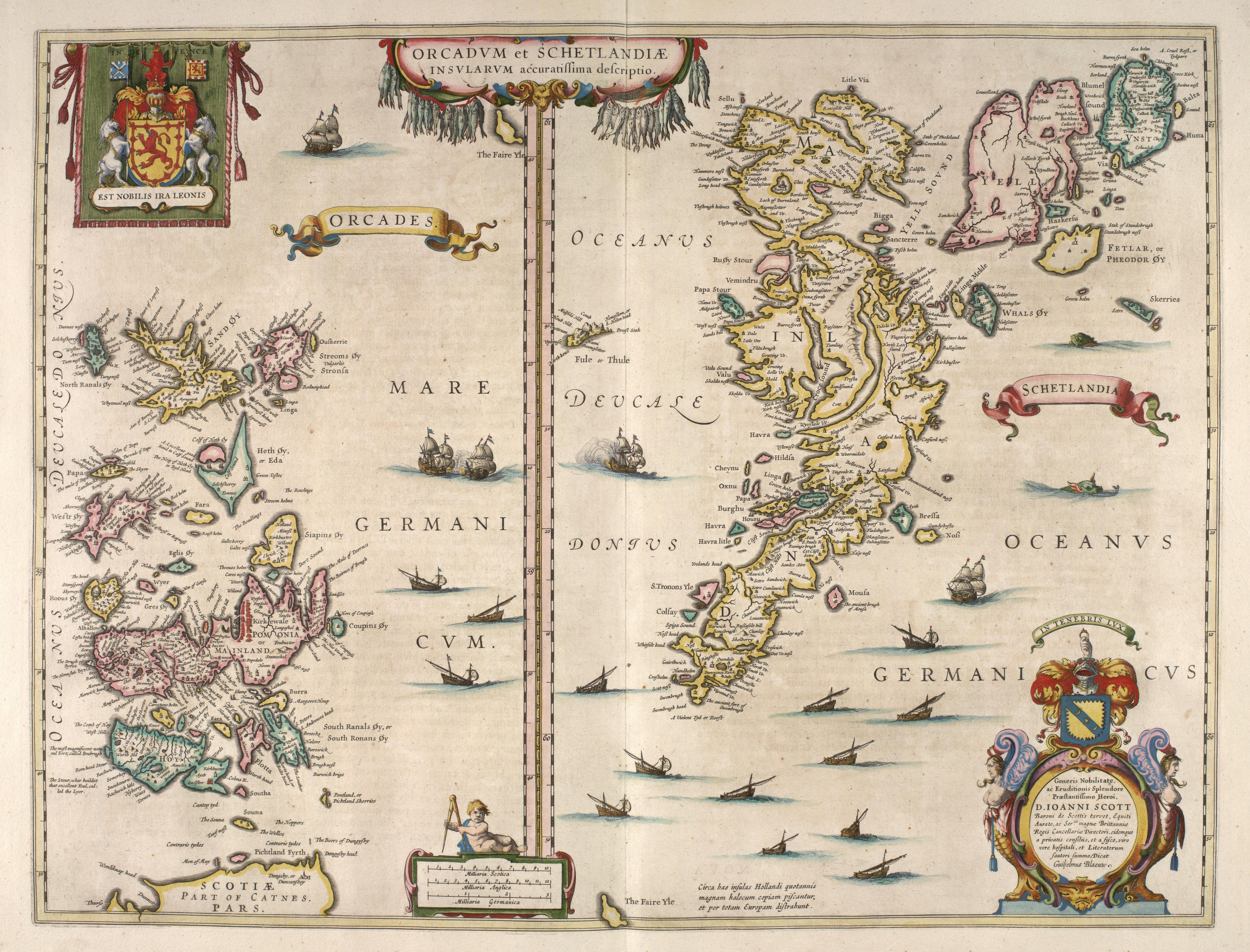
Johan Blaeu's 1654 map of Orkney and Shetland. Note that the "Calf of Heth Øy" has been transposed from its true position north east of Eday to the west.

The Norse gave animal names to some islands, especially to small islands alongside a larger one, other examples being the Calf of Man and the Horse of Copinsay. The islands name in Norse times was thus Kalfr. "Eday" is a name derived from the Old Norse eið and means "isthmus island".

In the 17th century Eday was also known as "Heth Øy" and the Calf's name is recorded by Blaeu as "Calf of Heth Øy".

== Wildlife ==
The dominant vegetation on the island is dry dwarf-shrub heath dominated by heather (Calluna vulgaris), with smaller areas of wet heath, semi-improved grassland and coastal grassland. The Calf of Eday supports 32 species of breeding birds and is designated as a Special Protection Area (SPA) for its importance as a nesting area. Gulls and cormorants (Phalacrocorax carbo) nest in the dry heath and grassland areas, whilst fulmars (Fulmarus glacialis), kittiwakes (Rissa tridactyla) and auks nest on the cliffs. The island has been designated an Important Bird Area (IBA) by BirdLife International because it supports breeding seabirds.

== See also ==
- Calf of Flotta
