= Faray =

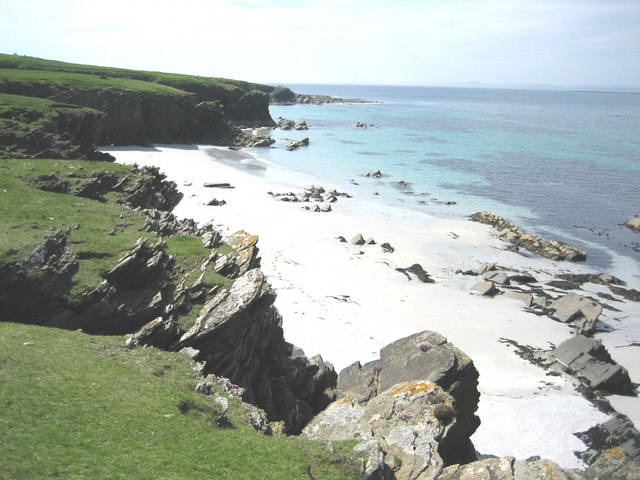
- Long Sand, situated on the western side of the island, facing Rapness Sound

Location
- Faray shown within Orkney
- OS grid reference: HY531364
- Coordinates: 59.2142°N 2.8231°W

Name
- Name meaning: Old Norse sheep island
- Old Norse name: Færey

Physical geography
- Island group: Orkney
- Area: 180 ha (0.69 sq mi)
- Area rank: 115=
- Highest elevation: 32 m (105 ft)

Administration
- Council area: Orkney Islands
- Country: Scotland
- Sovereign state: United Kingdom

Demographics
- Population: 0

Faray (Old Norse: Færey) is a small island in Orkney, Scotland, lying between Eday and Westray. Previously inhabited, the low-lying island is now a successful grey seal breeding colony.

== Geography ==
Faray and Holm of Faray are formed of a ridge of Old Red Sandstone which extends southwards from Weather Ness at the southern tip of the island of Westray and almost connects Westray to Eday. The two islands are separated by the Lavey Sound.

== History ==
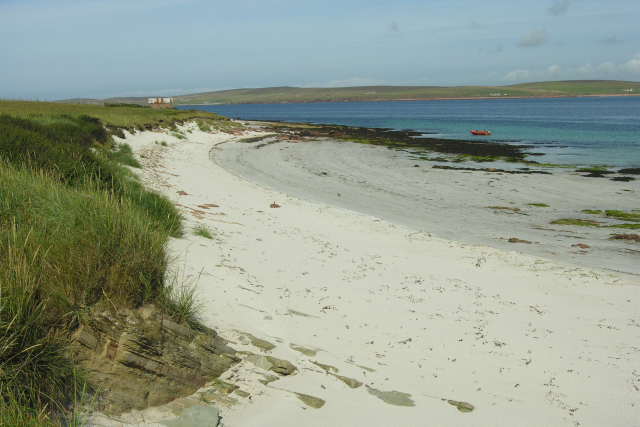
Scammalin Bay, near the south east corner of Faray with Eday in the distance

Faray was known as Pharay (or North Pharay to distinguish it from South Pharay, now called Fara). Both names are derived from the Old Norse 'faerey', "sheep island".

The only man-made relic of note is a chambered cairn beside Lavey Sound. Faray had a population of eighty-two in 1861, falling to fifty-eight by 1891. By the late 1930s there were eight families living on the island. They had crofts and supplemented their income by lobster fishing. World War II led to many departures. By 1947 the last islander had left Faray and, apart from occasional summer occupation, the island was deserted. A road still runs up the central spine of the island serving the scattered empty houses.

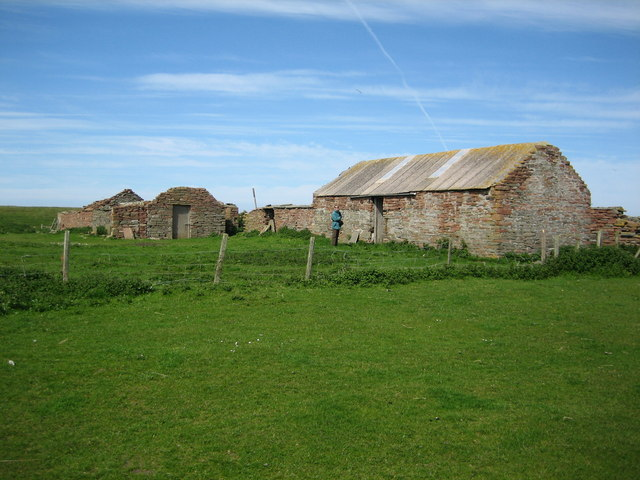
Hamar Farmhouse. In 1881 Faray had nine named houses with eight people living at Hamar.

In December 1908 the Hope, a fishing vessel from Peterhead, ran aground on the Holm of Faray during a storm. The 'Five Men of Faray' braved the storm to row across the Lavey Sound and rescue the crew stranded on the rocks. They were rewarded with a trip to the Scottish mainland to meet Edward VII at Balmoral, where they each received a medal, together with "a good pipe and some tobacco".

== Conservation ==
The island is now populated by sheep, seabirds, and grey seals. Faray and neighbouring Holm of Faray are designated a Special Area of Conservation for a well-established grey seal (Halichoerus grypus) breeding colony. The islands support the second-largest breeding colony in the UK, contributing around 9% of the annual UK pup production.
