= Toab, Orkney =

Coordinates: 58.923°N 2.835°W

Toab
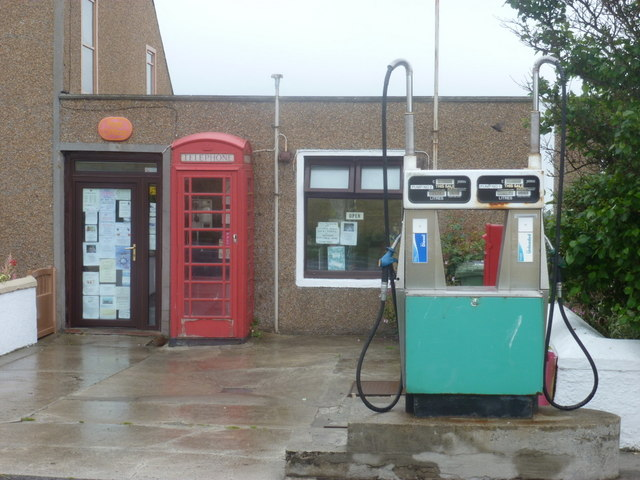
- The former Toab shop and petrol station in 2011

- Location within Orkney
- OS grid reference: HY510069
- Civil parish: St Andrews
- Council area: Orkney
- Lieutenancy area: Orkney
- Country: Scotland
- Sovereign state: United Kingdom
- Post town: ORKNEY
- Postcode district: KW17
- Dialling code: 01856
- Police: Scotland
- Fire: Scottish
- Ambulance: Scottish
- UK Parliament: Orkney and Shetland
- Scottish Parliament: Orkney

Toab is a village on the Orkney Mainland, situated in the East Mainland, off the A960 road, at the head of Deer Sound.

St Andrews Primary School is located in Toab, and serves the parishes of Holm, St Andrews, and Deerness. It is believed the name derives from the Norse word Tollhóp, meaning a place where visiting ships had to pay a toll.

People from Toab are known as ‘Toaboggans’, although this term is rarely used.

The districts of Toab and nearby Tankerness are often mistakenly referred to as parishes, though they both come under the civil parish of St Andrews.

== See also ==
- Mine Howe
