= The Gloup =

Coordinates: 58°57′21″N 2°42′42″W

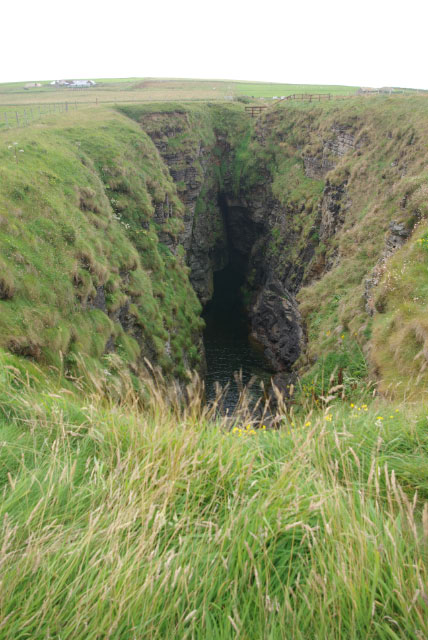
The Gloup

The Gloup (/ɡluːp/) is a collapsed sea cave in the Mull Head Nature Reserve in the islands of Orkney, Scotland.

The name derives from the Old Norse "gluppa", meaning a chasm. The cave is separated from the sea by a land bridge about 80 metres (262 ft) wide. It is approximately 40 metres (131 ft) long and 25 metres (82 ft) deep.

It is said that during the 19th and early 20th Centuries that old horses that were no longer fit to work on farms were led over the edge of The Gloup as a cheap and easy way to dispose of them.

It is on the east coast of the Deerness peninsula in the parish of St Andrews on the Orkney Mainland.
