= Black Holm =

Small tidal island in the Orkney Islands, near Copinsay to the west of Corn Hol

Coordinates: 58°54′12″N 2°42′21″W

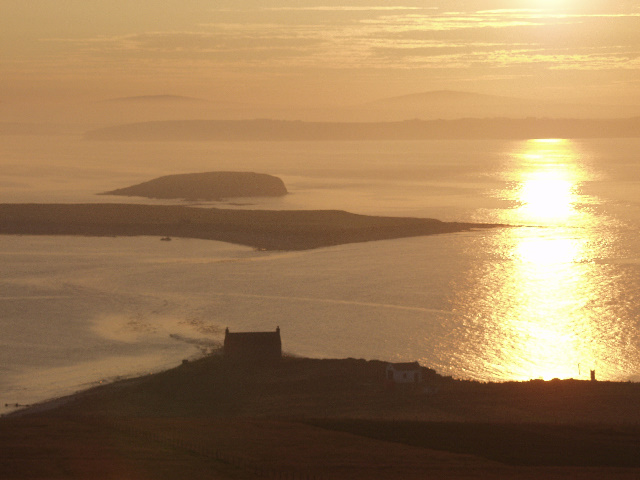
Corn Holm seen from Copinsay. Black Holm can be seen beyond it, and in the distance the parish of Deerness on Mainland, Orkney

Black Holm is a small tidal island in the Orkney Islands, near Copinsay to the west of Corn Holm off the north-eastern coast of Scotland.

== Geography and geology ==
Corn Holm is made up of red sandstone.

At low tide it is connected to Corn Holm which is in turn connected to Copinsay by a stretch called "Isle Rough".
