= Jacqui Wood =

British archaeologist

Jacqui Wood (born 4 January 1950) is a British experimental archaeologist and writer, specialising in the daily life of prehistoric Europeans.

As of 2001, she is director of Saveock Water Archaeology, and also the director and founder of Cornwall Celtic Village, a reconstructed Bronze to Iron Age settlement, at Saveock.

Wood was a member of the National Education Committee of the Council for British Archaeology (CBA) for three years, and secretary of the CBA for the south west region for another three years. As of 1995, she was a member of the General Committee of the Cornwall Archaeological Society and consultant to the Eden Project in Cornwall.

Wood has published papers in archaeology journals and conferences, and given lectures. She has also appeared on TV programmes about prehistoric dwellings and cooking, including episode 9 of series 11 of Time Team, and the Great British Baking Show season 1 episode 3. She has also given demonstrations of Bronze Age technology for English Heritage, researched the grass cloak of Ötzi the Iceman, as well as his shoes (which she believes are actually snowshoes), and made replicas of them for the Bolzano museum devoted to the mummy. She also made a replica of the Orkney Hood (Britain's oldest textile) for the Orkney Council, and replicas of various prehistoric dwellings. She has published on food history.

Wood has excavated a site at Saveock Water which she has interpreted as evidence of early modern witchcraft.

She has written two fantasy novels set in prehistory, Cliff Dreamers and Return to the Temple of the Mother.

== Bibliography ==
- Prehistoric Cooking. Stroud, Tempus, 2001.
- Cliff Dreamers, e-book.
- Tasting the Past: Recipes from the Stone Age to the Present. History Press.
- A new perspective on West Cornwall courtyard houses, Cornish Archaeology, 1997, number 36.
- Return to the Temple of the Mother, e-book, 2020.
