= Copinsay =

Island of the Orkney Islands, Scotland

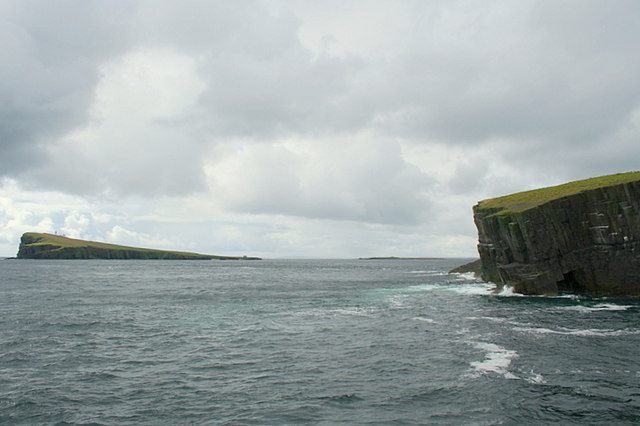
- Southwards from the eastern edge of the Horse of Copinsay. Copinsay lighthouse is on the high ground in the distance.

Location
- Copinsay shown within Orkney
- OS grid reference: HY607015
- Coordinates: 58.9°N 2.67°W

Name
- Name meaning: "Kobeinn's Island"
- Old Norse name: Kolbeinsey

Physical geography
- Island group: Orkney
- Area: 73 hectares (0.28 sq mi)
- Area rank: 170
- Highest elevation: 64 metres (210 ft)

Administration
- Council area: Orkney Islands
- Country: Scotland
- Sovereign state: United Kingdom

Demographics
- Population: 0
- Copinsay Lighthouse
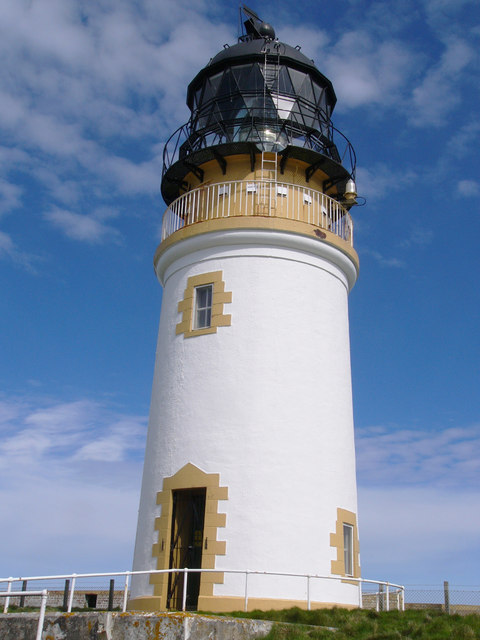
- Copinsay Lighthouse in 2005
- Coordinates: 58.896432°N 2.672027°W
- Constructed: 1915
- Built by: David Alan Stevenson
- Construction: stone tower
- Automated: 1991
- Height: 16 metres (52 ft)
- Shape: cylindrical tower with balcony and lantern
- Markings: white tower, black lantern, ochre trim
- Power source: solar power
- Operator: Royal Society for the Protection of Birds
- Heritage: category B listed building
- Focal height: 39 metres (128 ft)
- Range: 21 nautical miles (39 km; 24 mi)
- Characteristic: Fl(5) W 30s

Copinsay (Old Norse: Kolbeinsey) is one of the Orkney Islands in Scotland, lying off the east coast of the Orkney Mainland. The smaller companion island to Copinsay, Horse of Copinsay lies to the northeast. The Horse is uninhabited, and is managed as a bird reserve. Copinsay is also home to a lighthouse.

== History ==
For many generations, prior to the final inhabitants moving to the Mainland in 1958, Copinsay was full of life. This is evidenced by the large two storey farmhouse, the Steading (or farm buildings) behind it for the farm tenants, a school with a schoolteacher, and up to three lighthouse keepers' families. There is also an ancient burial site on the island.

In the earlier part of the 20th century, a weekly postal service provided contact with the Mainland, and there were fortnightly shopping trips to Deerness, allowing for weather. The farm had working horses, cattle and sheep - all of which had to be transported on the "coo" or "cow" boat. Bird's eggs provided a good supplement to the islanders' diet, and men were lowered over the cliffs on a special rope, or were rowed out to the Horse to bring back this addition. Pigs were loosed in the Spring on the Horse for many years, and they fed on the bird's eggs.

Many interesting facts and accounts of life on Copinsay are still retold in the Deerness Community, with many members still remembering when the island was still home to loved ones. Myths about the island include the story of the Copinsay Brownie.

The island was bought by the ornithology charity RSPB in 1972 in memory of the naturalist James Fisher.

== Ecology ==
Although Copinsay today is uninhabited, some fields are still farmed at the behest of the RSPB, to try provide suitable conditions for Corncrake. As a result, a patchwork of yesteryear is returning to the island, even though the people have not. Together with the three adjacent islets (Corn Holm, Ward Holm and Black Holm), it is designated a Special Protection Area (SPA) under the European Union directive on the Conservation of Wild Birds due to the unimproved grassland vegetation and sheer sandstone cliffs providing ideal breeding ledges for seabirds. There is a large colony of grey seals on the island. They usually pup in November each year. Puffins can be seen during July on the adjacent holms.

The island has been designated an Important Bird Area (IBA) by BirdLife International because it supports significant breeding populations of seabirds.

== See also ==
- List of lighthouses in Scotland
- List of Northern Lighthouse Board lighthouses
