= Orkney Hood =

Iron Age woollen cloak

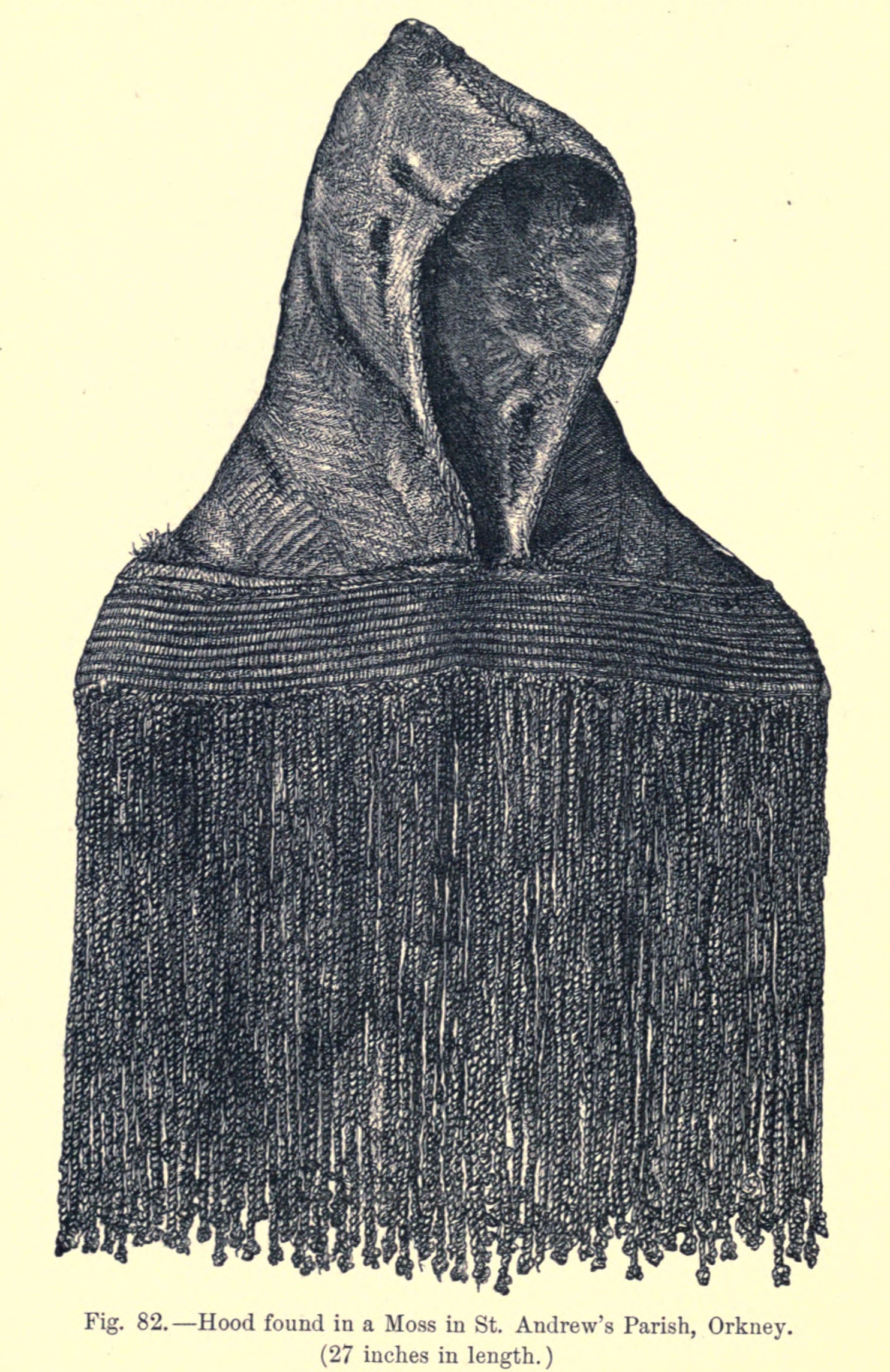
Orkney Hood

The Orkney Hood is an Iron Age garment, now in the collection of National Museums Scotland. It is in the form of a woollen hood with tablet-woven trim and fringe. The hood was found in 1867, in a peat bog in Tankerness, within the parish of St. Andrews in the Orkney Islands.

== Dating ==
The Orkney hood was taken to the National Museum of Scotland in Edinburgh for display, and it remained on display there for approximately 83 years, until A. S. Henshall studied it in the 1950s. Henshall came to the conclusion that the hood was likely from the Iron Age or Viking Age, as the weaving techniques shared similarities with Scandinavian textile production in the period.

In 1991 a sample of the wool from the hood was tested at the Oxford University Radiocarbon Accelerator Unit. Radiocarbon testing dated the hood to some point between 250 and 615 CE.

== Construction ==
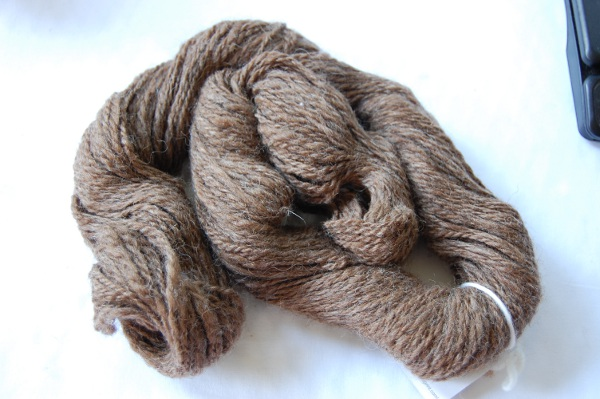
A sample of handspun wool from a blend of Morrit and Shetland wool displaying the natural colour of the wool

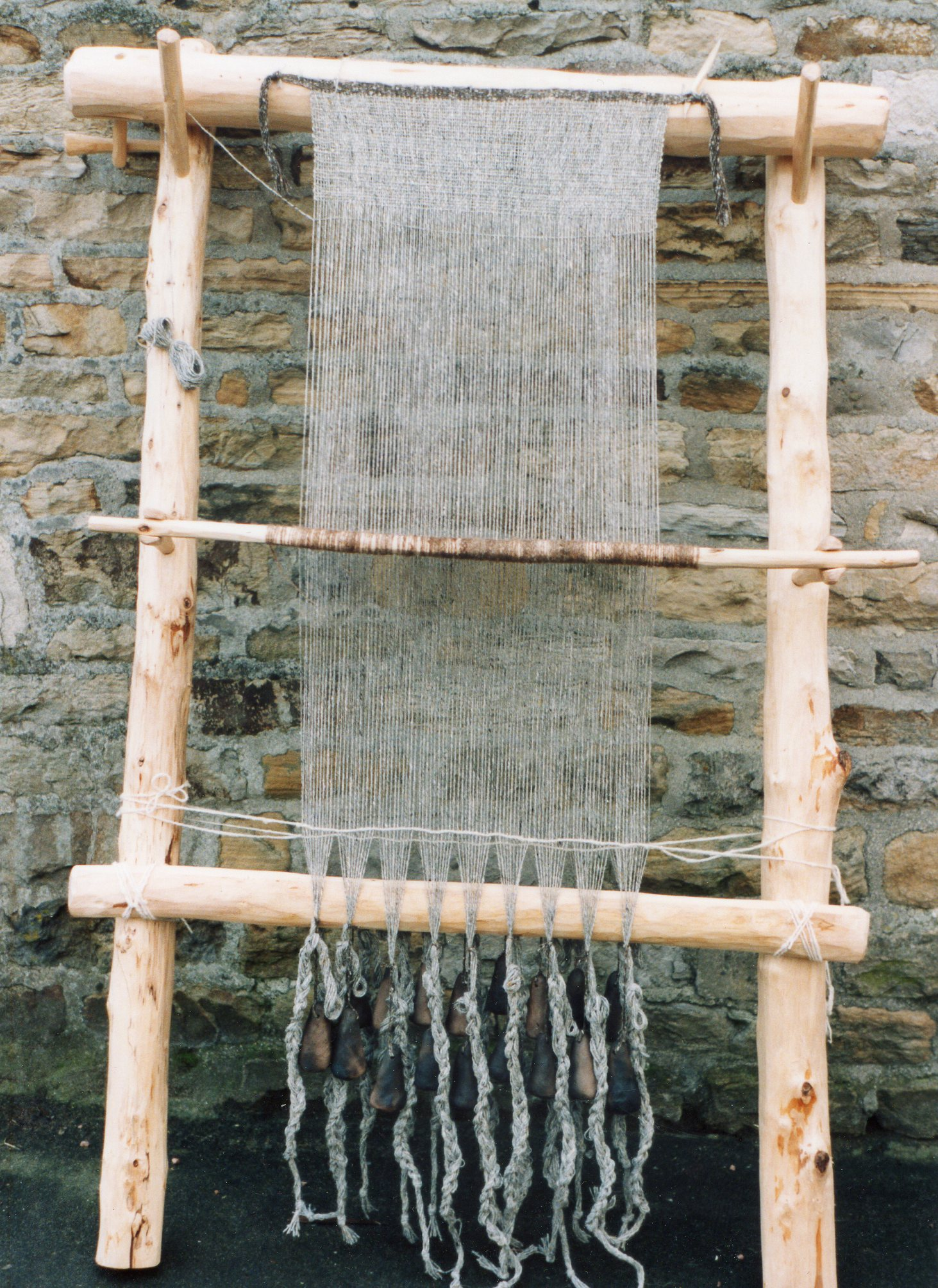
A reproduction of an Iron Age warp weighted loom

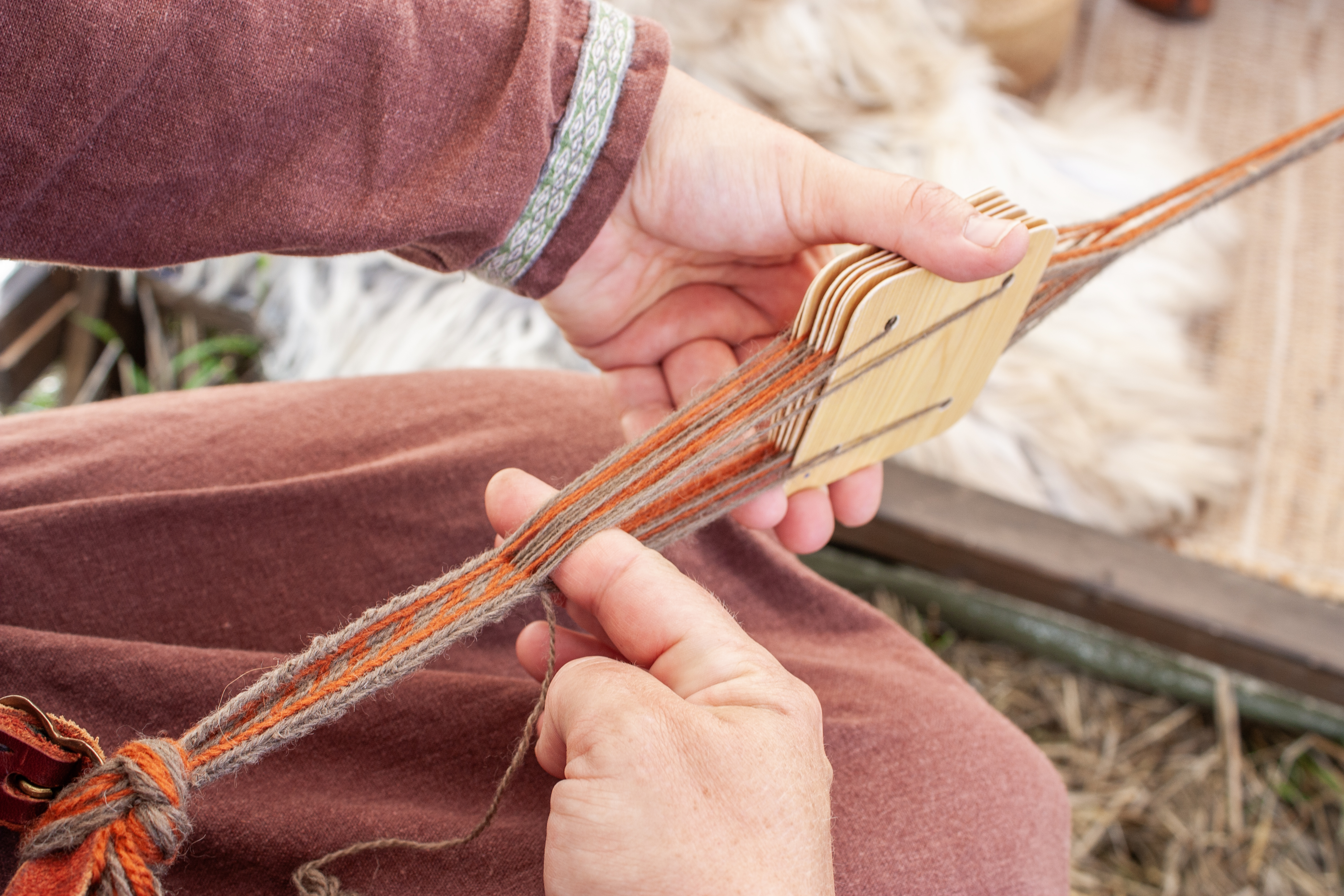
An example of tablet weaving using four hole cards

The Orkney hood is relatively small, indicating that it was likely made for a child of about eight or nine years of age. The hood consists of three separate woven pieces; the fabric that makes up the hood itself and two tablet woven bands that were attached around the circumference of the bottom hem of the hood. The cloth that makes up the hood and the wider fringed tablet woven band seem to have come from other finer garments that were later cut up and reused to create the hood.

In 1981 the hood was taken to the conservation and research laboratories of the National Museum of Antiquaries of Scotland for conservation. An analysis of the wool was undertaken prior to conservation, and it indicated that the wool had not been dyed. Instead, the brown colouration was primarily a result of the color of the wool itself. The wool was found to have come Castlemilk Moorit sheep, which naturally have brown fleeces.

=== Hood body ===
The fabric used to make the main part of the hood would have been woven on a warp weighted loom. According to Henshall's report in the early 1950s, the woven fabric measured at least 49x45 centimetres and the hood was likely cut from a larger piece of cloth, as indicated by the lack of selvedges present in the garment. The cloth that makes up the main part of the hood is a 2/2 herringbone twill with "erratic widths of the chevron stripes." The stripes range from 18 warp threads per stripe to 88 warp threads for stripe. This is unusual, as the chevron stripes in examples of 2/2 twill from the Iron Age are generally quite even. At every point where the direction of the chevron stripes change the number of threads per inch also changed. The cloth was woven with thread that varied in thickness, and the changes in direction may have been used to mask the variation of the thickness of the thread.

=== Narrow tablet woven band ===
There are two tablet woven bands attached to the circumference of the hem of the hood, which would have sat across the wearer's shoulders and chest. The narrower of the two woven bands was attached to the bottom edge of the body of the hood, and the wider tablet woven band with a corded fringe was sewn along the bottom of the thinner band.

The narrow band was made woven using six tablets, resulting in a 2 centimetre wide band. The threads used to weave the narrow band displayed more variation in color and thickness than those used in the woven fabric of the hood and the wide tablet woven band. The narrow band was woven using a combination of 4 and 2 hole tablets. Two weft threads were used, which would have sped up the weaving process significantly. The weft threads each measured approximately 2 millimetres in width.

=== Wide tablet woven band ===
The narrow tablet woven band was sewn along the bottom edge of the body of the hood, and another, wider tablet woven band with a long fringe was sewn along the bottom edge of the narrow band. The lower edge of the wide tablet woven band would have fallen just below the wearer's shoulderand across their chest, with the fringe cascading down.

Another similar textile from the 5th century BCE was found at Haraldskær Møse in Jutland. This textile fragment also features a long cord fringe, similar to that of the Orkney hood. The technique used for these fringed tablet woven bands was in use from Iron Age to the Viking Age, as was herringbone twill wool.

At least eight pairs of regularly spaced holes have been identified on the wide tablet woven band alongside each side of the face opening. Some of the holes have the remains of short leather thongs threaded through them, some of which are knotted. When the hood was worn these would not have been visible. The purpose of the leather thongs is unclear, but they made have been used to attach the hood to another garment or as a way to house a drawstring.

Fifty tablets were used to weave the band, which measured to wider than 66 centimeters when finished. The warp is a mix of light and dark brown threads, resulting in horizontal striped hands that run the length of the band. The weaver used a mix of two and four holed tablets; 26 two holed and 24 four holed. Each group of tablets was threaded in a different way, adding to the pattern of the twists.

The wide tablet woven band may have been taken from another garment and repurposed. This is indicated by the band longer than entire circumference of the hood; it wraps around the hood almost twice, leaving a gap of about 20 cm in the back of the hood with only one layer of the wide band and fringe.
