= Snowshoe =

Footwear for walking easily across snow

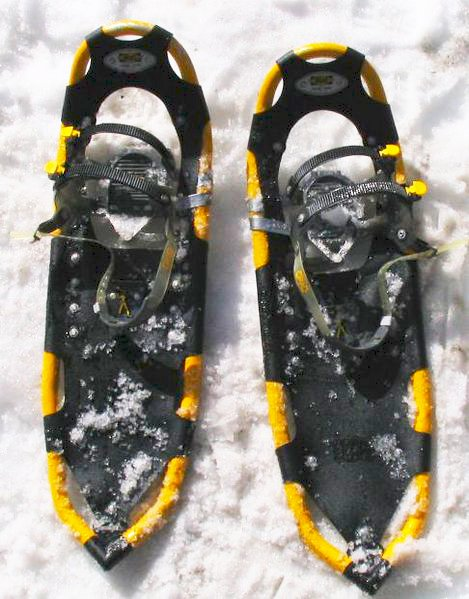
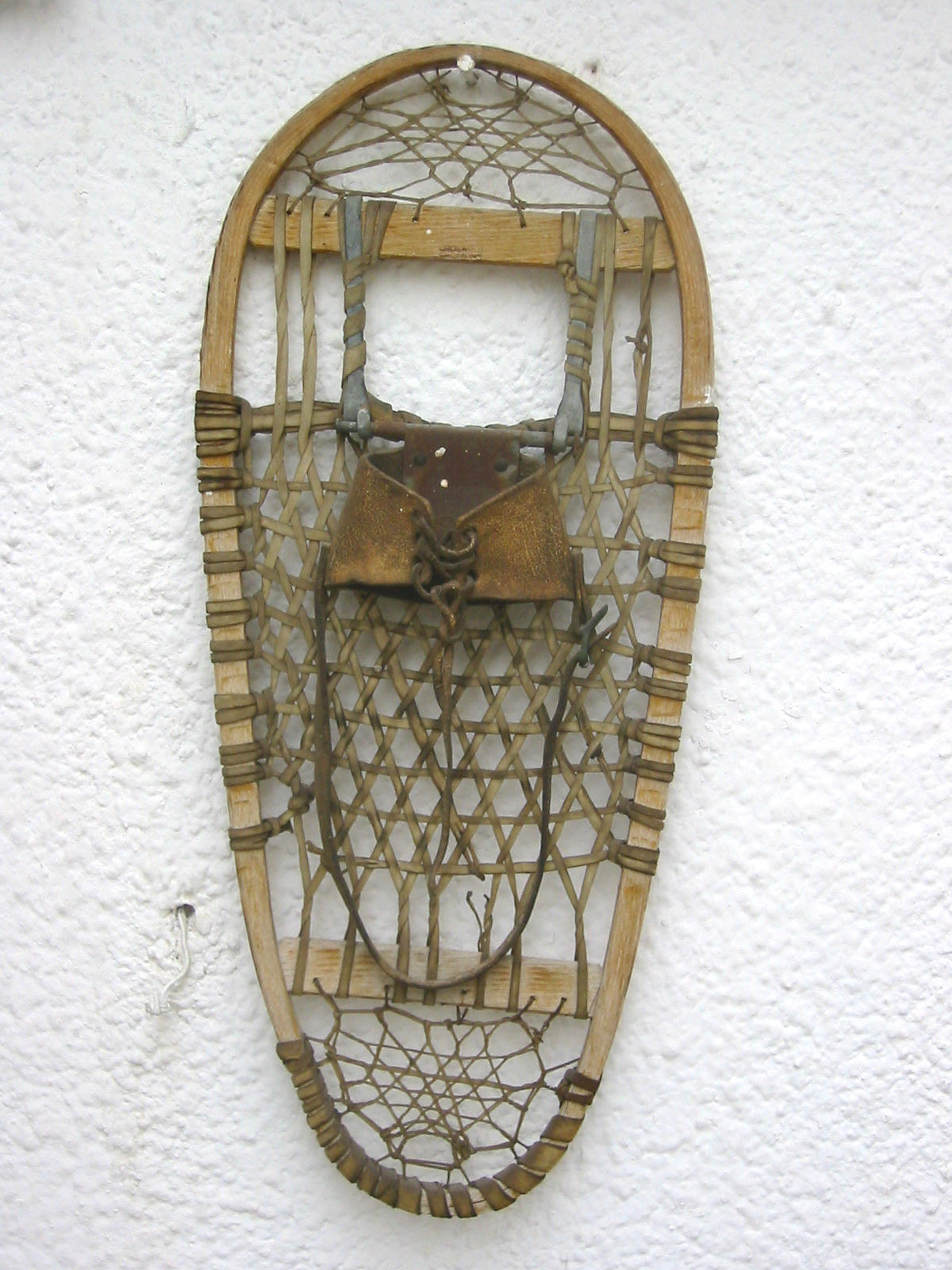
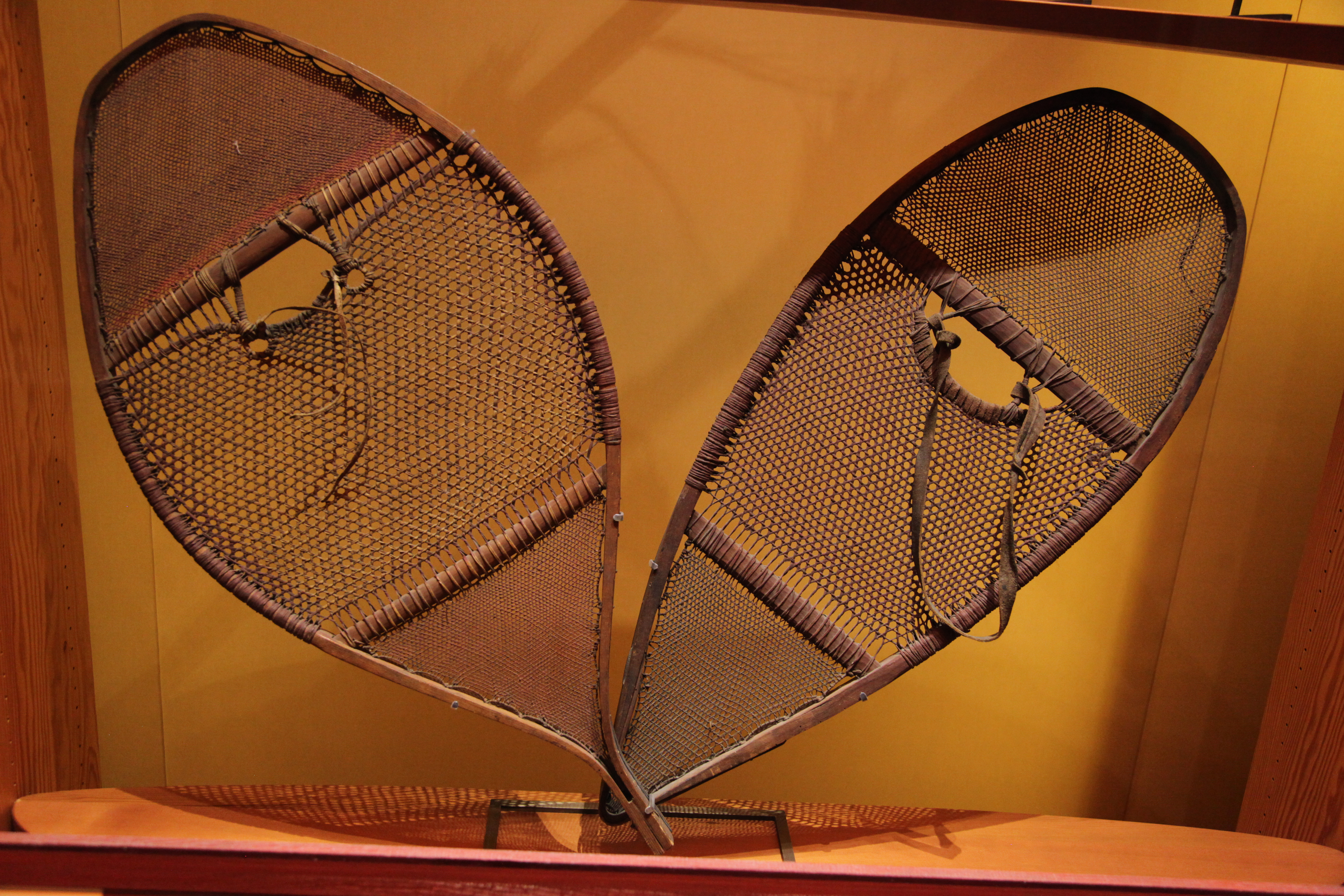
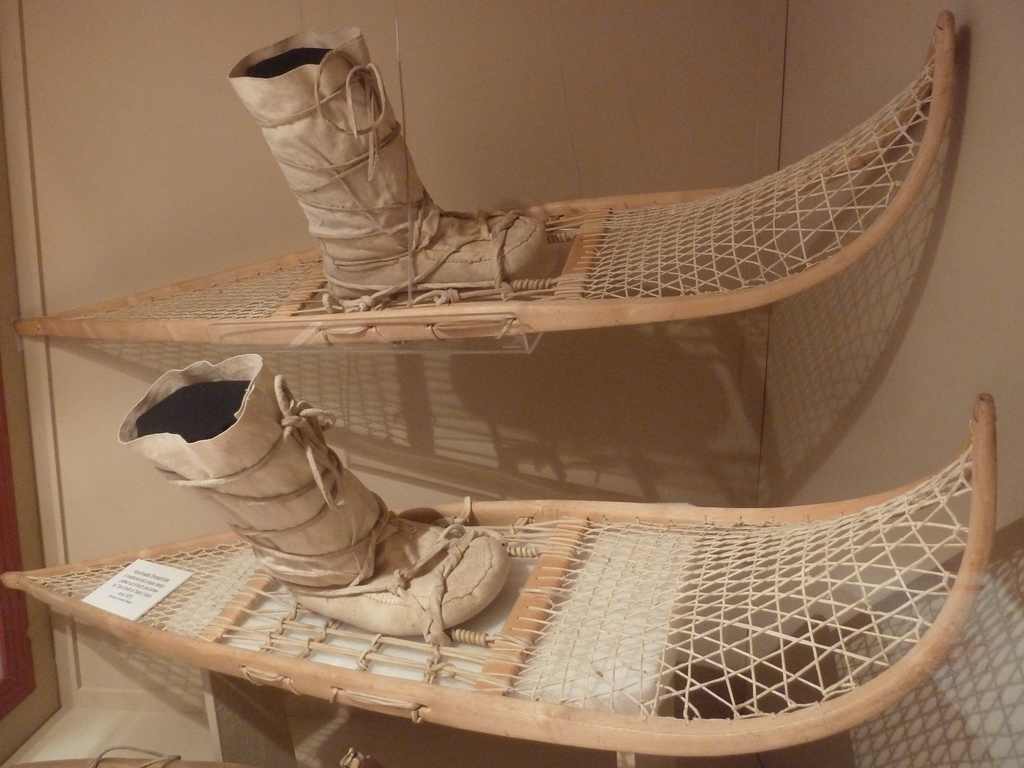
Various examples of snowshoes

Snowshoes are specialized outdoor gear for walking over snow. Their large footprint spreads the user's weight out and allows them to travel largely on top of rather than through snow. Adjustable bindings attach them to appropriate winter footwear.

Traditional snowshoes have a hardwood frame filled in with rawhide latticework. Modern snowshoes are made of lightweight metal, plastic, and other synthetic materials.

In the past, snowshoes were essential equipment for anyone dependent on travel in deep and frequent snowfall, such as fur trappers. They retain that role in areas where motorized vehicles cannot reach or are inconvenient to use. However, their greatest contemporary use is for recreation.

== Development ==
=== Origins ===
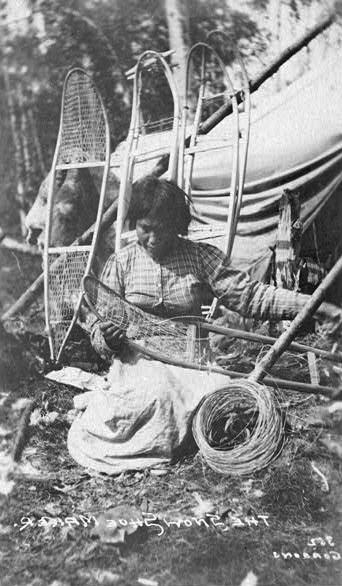
Traditional snowshoe maker, c. 1900–1930

Before people built snowshoes, nature provided examples. Several animals, such as the lynx and most notably the snowshoe hare, had evolved over the years with oversized feet enabling them to move more quickly through deep snow.

The origin and age of snowshoes are not precisely known, although historians believe they were invented from 4,000 to 6,000 years ago, probably starting in Central Asia. British archaeologist Jacqui Wood hypothesized that the equipment interpreted to be the frame of a backpack of the Chalcolithic mummy Ötzi was actually part of a snowshoe. Strabo wrote that the inhabitants of the Caucasus used to attach flat surfaces of leather under their feet and that its inhabitants used round wooden surfaces, something akin to blocks, instead. However, the "traditional" webbed snowshoe as used today had direct origins to North American Indigenous people, e.g., the Huron, Cree, and so forth. Samuel de Champlain wrote, referencing the Huron and Algonquin First Nations, in his travel memoirs (V.III, p. 164), "Winter, when there is much snow, they (the Indians) make a kind of snowshoe that are two to three times larger than those in France, that they tie to their feet, and thus go on the snow, without sinking into it, otherwise they would not be able to hunt or go from one location to the other".

=== North American Indigenous peoples ===
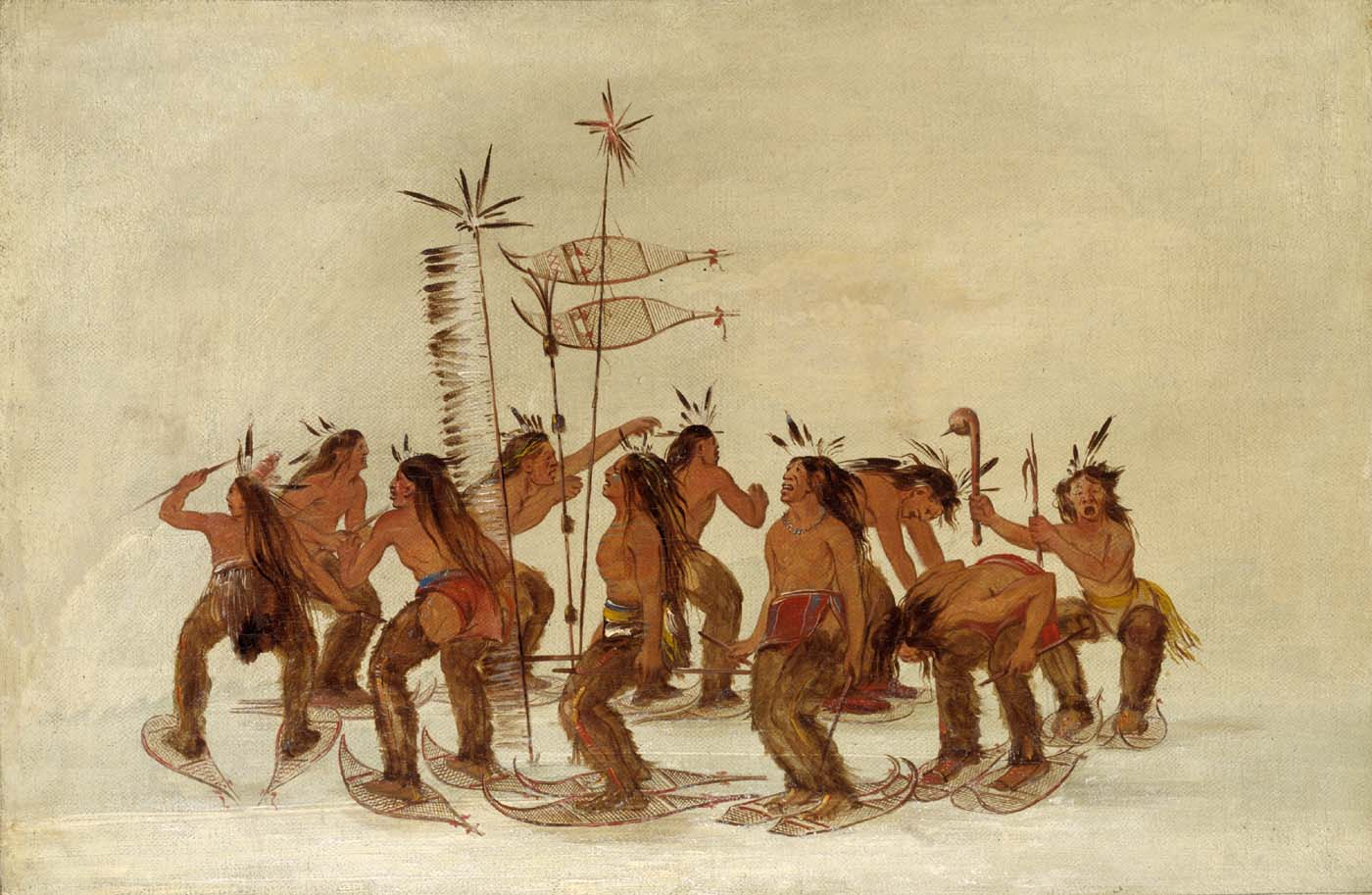
Plains Ojibwe performing a snowshoe dance. Note double-pointed snowshoes. Drawing by George Catlin

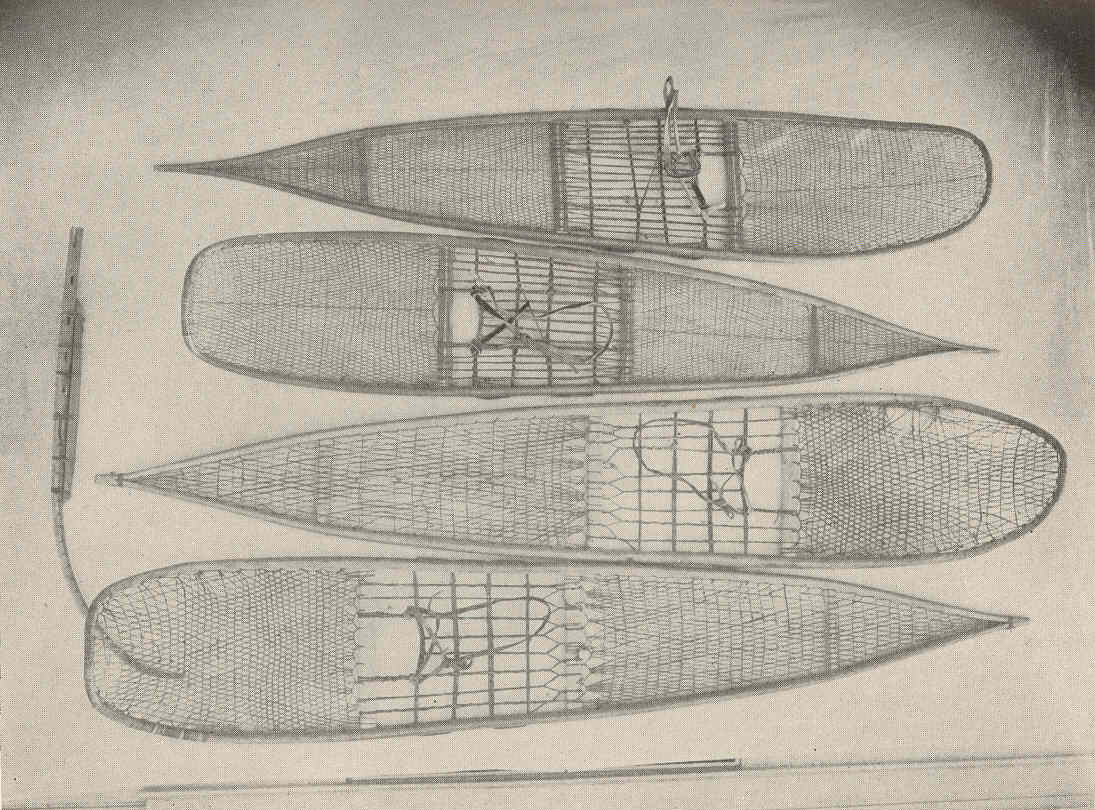
Traditional snowshoes of the Yukon Valley.

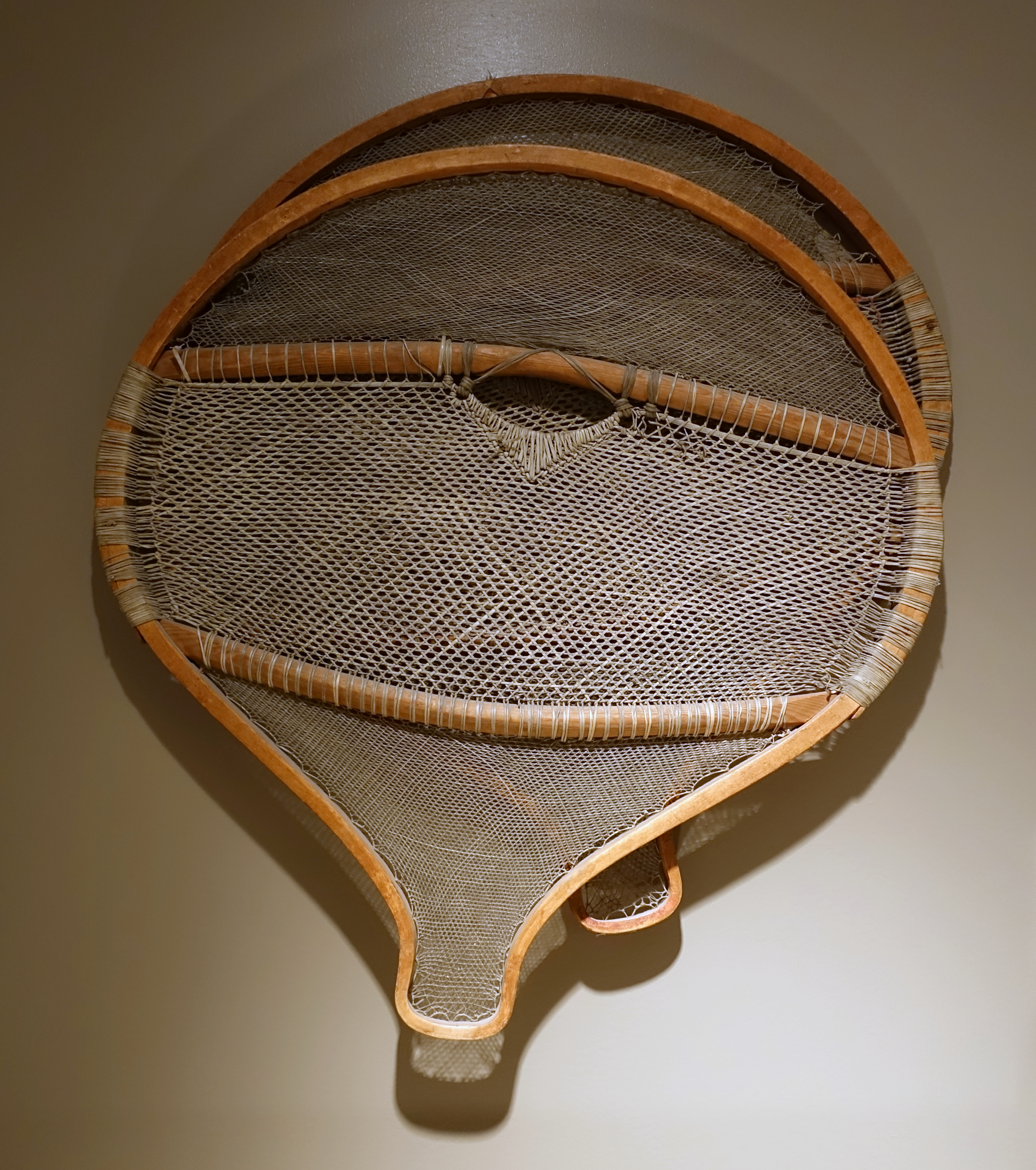
Traditional Montagnais Beaver-tail snowshoes. Note fine weave.

The Indigenous peoples of North America developed the most advanced and diverse snowshoes prior to the 20th century. Different shapes were adapted to the different conditions in each region. Despite their great diversity in form, snowshoes were, in fact, one of the few cultural elements common to all tribes that lived where the winters were snowy, in particular, the Northern regions. Nearly every Indigenous peoples of the Americas culture developed its own particular shape of shoe, the simplest being those of the far north.

The Inuit have two styles, one being triangular in shape and about 18 inches (46 cm) in length, and the other almost circular, both reflecting the need for high flotation in deep, loose and powdery snow. However, contrary to popular perception, the Inuit did not use their snowshoes much since they did most of their foot travel in winter over sea ice or on the tundra, where snow does not pile up deeply.

Southward the shoe becomes gradually narrower and longer, one of the largest being the hunting snowshoe of the Cree, which is nearly 6 ft (1.8 m) long and turned up at the toe.

Athapaskan snowshoes are made for travelling quickly on dry powder over flat, open land in Alaska and the Canadian northwest. They were used for keeping up with dog sleds, and breaking trail for them. They can be over 7 ft (2.1 m) long, and are narrow with an upturned toe.

Ojibwe snowshoes were designed for maneuverability, and are pointed at both ends, making it easier to step backwards. They are also easier to construct, as the outer frame is made in two pieces.

Huron snowshoes are tailheavy, which means they track well but do not turn easily. They are broad enough that the maximum width has to be tucked against the tail of the other snowshoe with each step, or the straddle will be too wide for the wearer. They are also meant for open country, and can carry heavy loads.

Snowshoes developed by the Iroquois are narrower and shorter, reflecting the need for maneuverability in forested areas.

The Bearpaw style was widely used in the dense forests of Quebec and Labrador. It has no tail, and turns easily.

The Plains Indians wore snowshoes on their winter season bison hunts before horses were introduced.

=== Use by Europeans ===
==== Pre-contact Eurasian ski-snowshoes ====
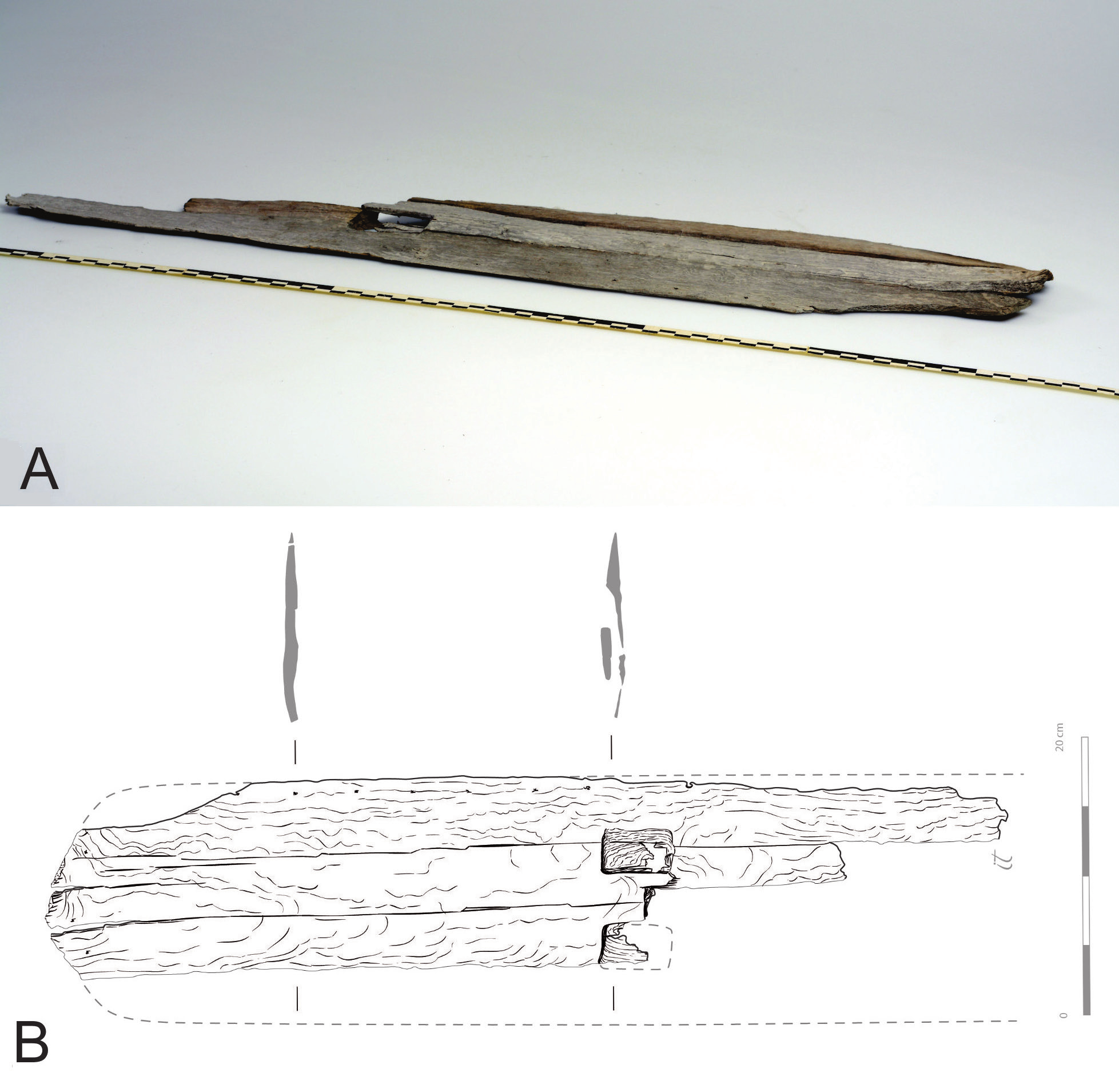
Prehistoric (791–540 BCE) solid-wood "ski-snowshoe" found in the mountain glaciers of Norway. The carved horizontal hole was used to tie it onto the foot, as in traditional European skis (which seem to have been far more common); the bottom is unworn, so it was probably covered in fur for grip.

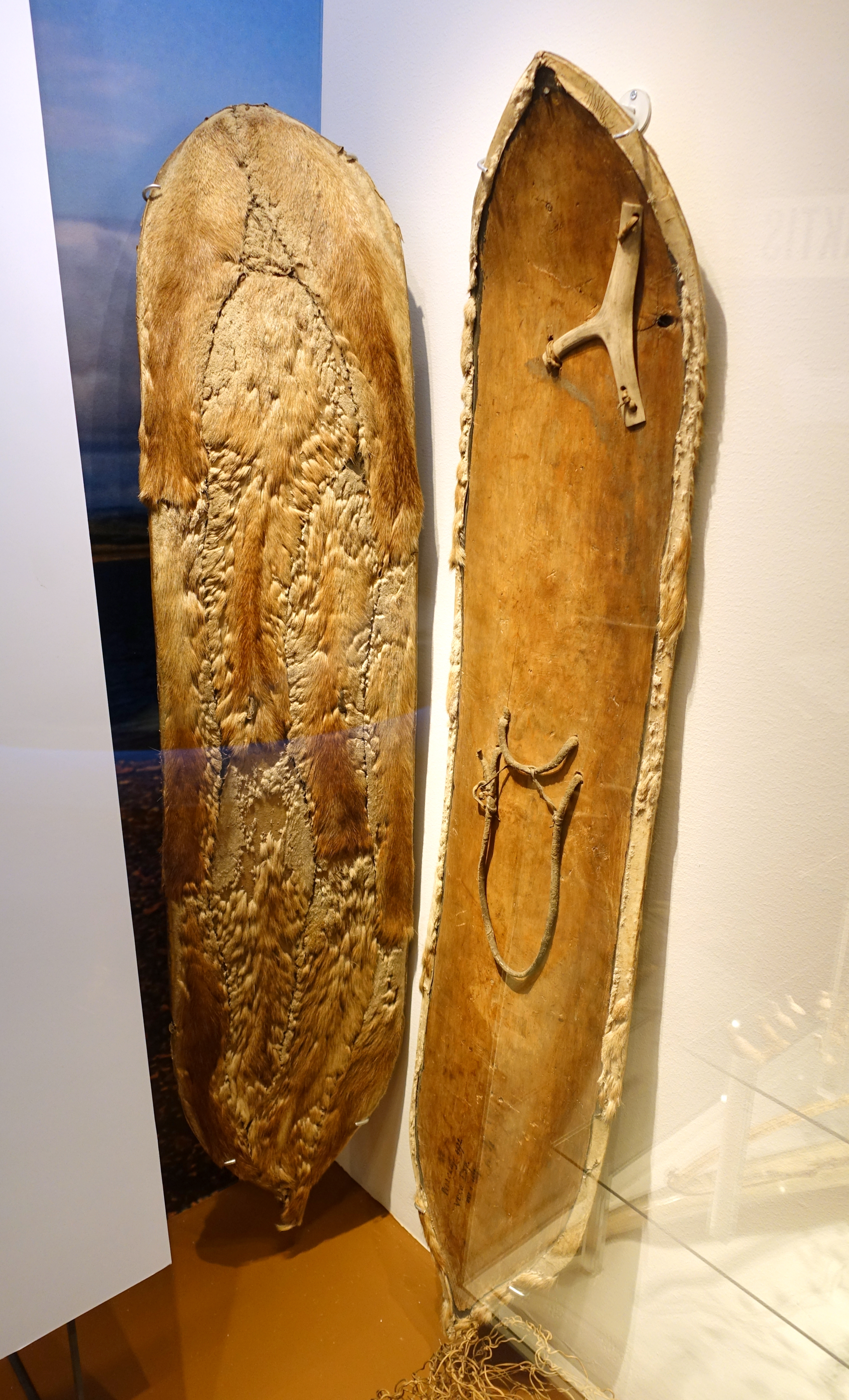
Similar 1800s Eastern-Siberian footwear, Chukchi people. Note fur ski skins.

In 2016, "the oldest [extant] snowshoe in the world", found in a melting glacier in the Dolomites in Italy, was dated to between 3800 and 3700 BCE. It was a crude frame snowshoe.

Solid-wood "ski-snowshoes", essentially short, wide versions of traditional skis, were used in Eurasia. They were made of light woods such as pine. Slender skis seem to have been more popular. Both types of footwear were lined with furs for climbing.

In Northwest North America in the early twentieth century, Roald Amundsen compared the solid-wood Norwegian skis he used with the local snowshoes worn by his travelling companions; he judged the skis faster in some conditions and the snowshoes faster in others.

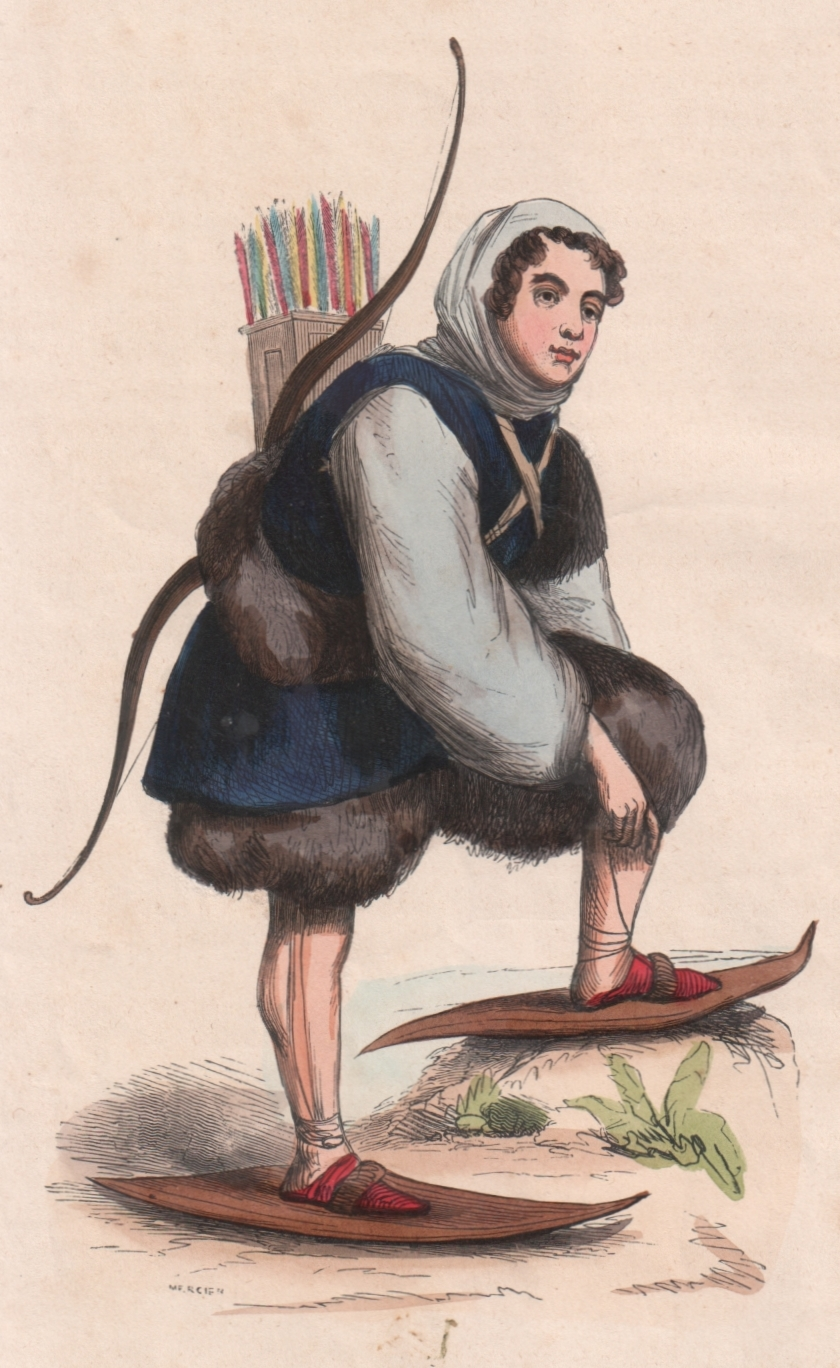
Nenets snowshoes, apparently also solid wood

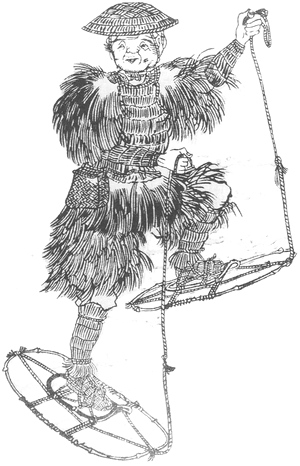
Kanjiki, Japanese snowshoes, 1837

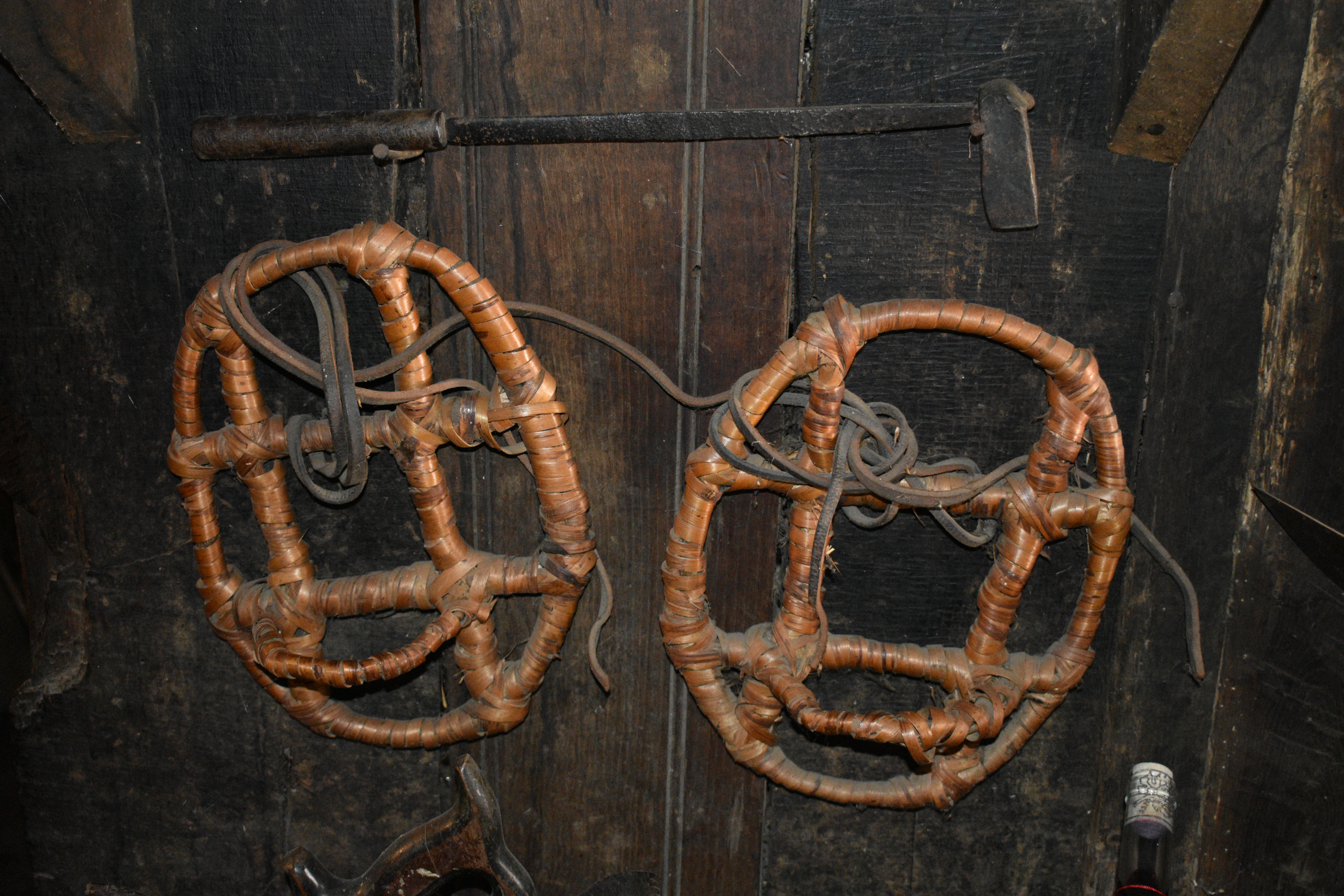
Marañóns, traditional Galician snowshoes (date?)

==== Post-American-contact ====
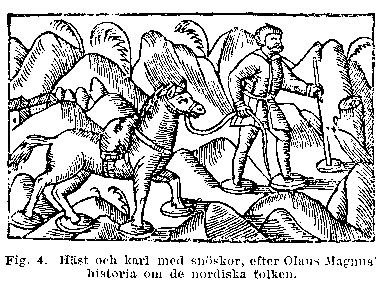
16th-century depiction of Swedish traveler with both horse and man wearing snowshoes

North-American-type snowshoes were slowly adopted by Europeans during early colonialism in what later became Canada and the United States. The French voyageurs and coureurs des bois began to travel throughout the land of the Cree, Huron, and Algonquin nations in the late 17th century to trap animals and trade goods. In order to travel effectively in the terrain and climate, they utilized the tools of the Native populations, such as snowshoes and canoes.

The Oxford English Dictionary reports the term "snowshoe" being used by the English as early as 1674. In 1690, after a French-Indian raiding party attacked a British settlement near what is today Schenectady, New York, the British took to snowshoes and pursued the attackers for almost 50 miles (80 km), ultimately recovering both people and goods taken by their attackers. Snowshoes became popular by the time of the French and Indian Wars, during engagements such as The Battle on Snowshoes, when combatants of both sides wore snowshoes atop a reported four feet (1.22 meters) of snow.

The "teardrop" snowshoes worn by lumberjacks are about 40 inches (1.0 m) long and broad in proportion, while the tracker's shoe is over 5 feet (1.5 m) long and very narrow. This form, the stereotypical snowshoe, resembles a tennis racquet, and indeed the French term is raquette à neige. This form was copied by the Canadian snowshoe clubs of the late 18th century. Founded for military training purposes, they became the earliest recreational users of snowshoes.

The snowshoe clubs such as the Montreal Snow Shoe Club (1840) shortened the teardrop to about 40 inches (100 cm) long and 15 to 18 inches (380 to 460 mm) broad, slightly turned up at the toe and terminating in a kind of tail behind. This is made very light for racing purposes, but much stouter for touring or hunting. The tail keeps the shoe straight while walking.

Teardrop snowshoes and Bearpaw snowshoes in the Gatineau Park

Another variant, the "bearpaw", ends in a curved heel instead of a tail. While many early enthusiasts found this more difficult to learn on, as they were thicker in the middle and rather cumbersome, they did have the advantage of being easier to pack and nimbler in tight spaces. Two forms of traditional bearpaw snowshoes developed: an eastern version used by "spruce gummers" consisting of an oval frame with wooden cross braces, and a western version with a rounded triangular frame and no wooden bracing.

Traditional snowshoes are made of a single strip of some tough wood, usually white ash, curved round and fastened together at the ends and supported in the middle by a light cross-bar. The space within the frame is filled with a close webbing of dressed caribou or neat's-hide strips, leaving a small opening just behind the cross-bar for the toe of the moccasined foot. They are fastened to the moccasin by leather thongs, sometimes by buckles. Such shoes are still made and sold by native peoples.

Compared to modern Indigenous-made snowshoes, wood-and-rawhide snowshoes mass-produced by Europeans tend to have looser, simpler webbing, with wider rawhide strips, as this is cheaper to make. However, this may reduce the floatation and let the shoes sink in powder.

== Modern ==
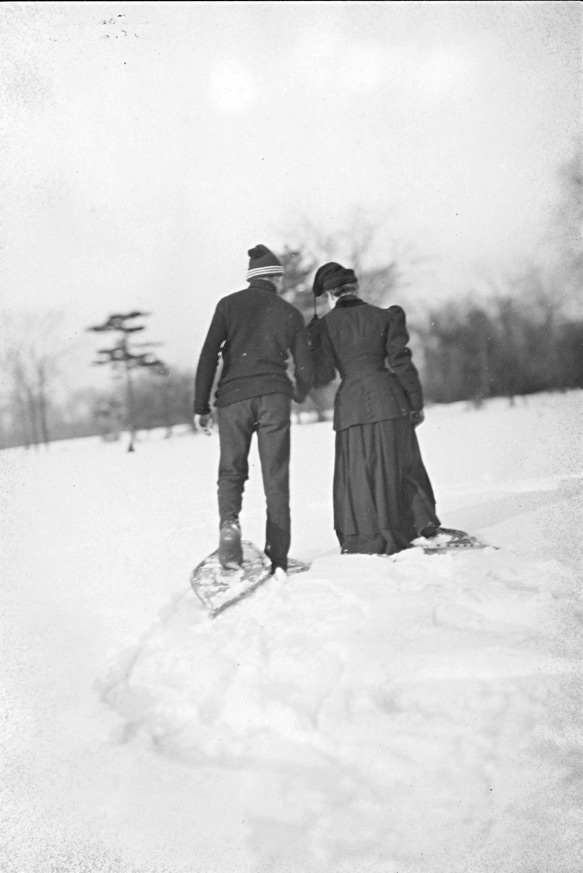
Canadian couple snowshoeing in 1907

Outside of Indigenous populations and some competitions such as the Arctic Winter Games, very few of the old-fashioned snowshoes are actually used by enthusiasts anymore, although some value them for the artisanship involved in their construction. They are sometimes seen as decorations, mounted on walls or on mantels in ski lodges.

Even though many enthusiasts prefer aluminum snowshoes, there is still a large group of snowshoe enthusiasts who prefer wooden snowshoes. Wooden frames do not freeze as readily. Many enthusiasts also prefer wood snowshoes because they are very quiet.

While recreational use of snowshoes began with snowshoe clubs in Quebec, Canada (who held events where races and hikes were combined with fine food and drink), the manufacture of snowshoes for recreational purposes effectively began in the late 19th century, when serious recreational use became more widespread.

In the late 20th century the snowshoe underwent a radical redesign. It started in the 1950s when the Vermont-based Tubbs company created the Green Mountain Bearpaw, which combined the shortness of that style with an even narrower width than had previously been used (Pospisil 1979). This rapidly became one of the most popular snowshoes of its day.

== Selection ==
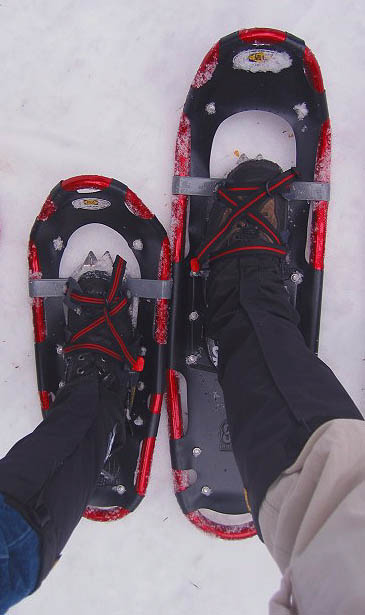
Properly adjusted bindings on two snowshoes of different size. Note use of gaiters.

Snowshoes today are divided into three types:

- aerobic/running (small and light; not intended for backcountry use);
- recreational (a bit larger; meant for use in gentle-to moderate walks of 3–5 miles (4.8–8.0 km)); and
- mountaineering (the largest, meant for serious hill-climbing, long-distance trips and off-trail use).

Sizes are often given in inches, even though snowshoes are nowhere near perfectly rectangular. Mountaineering shoes can be at least 30 inches (76 cm) long by 10 inches (25 cm) wide; a lighter pair of racing shoes can be slightly narrower and 25 inches (64 cm) or shorter.

Regardless of configuration, all wooden shoes are referred to as "traditional" and all shoes made of other materials are called "modern".

=== Bindings ===
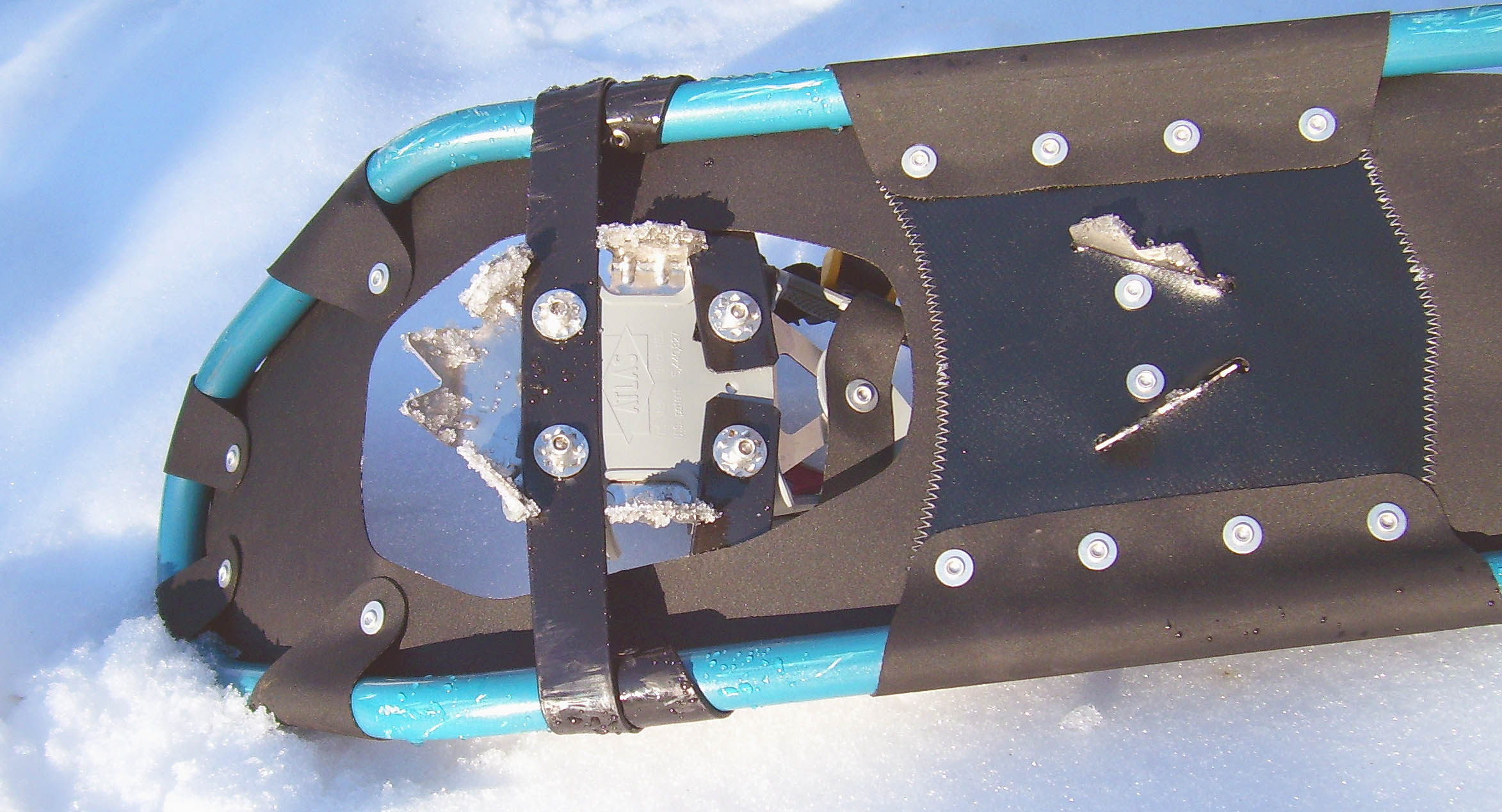
Underside of a modern fixed-rotation binding snowshoe, showing cleats for traction on steep slopes

As is often the case with downhill skis, wood-frame snowshoes and suitable bindings are typically marketed and purchased separately rather than as a single piece. One common style is termed the "H" binding, as it consists of a strap around the heel crossing a strap around the toe and one at the instep, forming a rough version of the eponymous letter.

On modern shoes, there are two styles of binding: fixed-rotation (also known as "limited-rotation") bindings, and full-rotation (also known as "pivot") bindings. With either binding system, the heel is left free, and the difference is in how the ball of the foot is attached to the snowshoe.

In fixed-rotation bindings, the binding is attached to the snowshoe with an elastic strap that brings the tail of the snowshoe up with each step. The snowshoe therefore moves with the foot and the tail does not drag. Fixed-rotation bindings are preferred for racing. Full-rotation bindings allow the user's toes to pivot below the deck of the snowshoe. They allow the crampon cleats that are under the foot to be kicked into a slope for grip in climbing, but are relatively awkward for stepping sideways and backwards as the tail of the snowshoe can drag. Fixed-rotation bindings often cause snow to be kicked up the back of the wearer's legs; this does not tend to happen with full-rotation bindings.

A series of straps, usually three, are used to fasten the foot to the snowshoe. Some styles of binding use a cup for the toe. It is important that a user be able to manipulate these straps easily, as removing or securing the foot often must be done outdoors in cold weather with bare hands, exposing him or her to the possibility of frostbite. When putting on snowshoes, left is distinguished from right by which way the loose ends of the binding straps point: always outward, to avoid stepping on them repeatedly.

In 1994, Bill Torres and a younger associate developed the step-in binding, designed to make it easier for snowshoers wearing hard-shelled plastic boots (serious mountaineers) to change from snowshoes to crampons and back again as needed.

=== Accessories ===
Snowshoers often use trekking poles as an accessory to help them keep their balance on the snow. Some manufacturers have begun making special snowshoeing models of their poles, with larger baskets more like those found on ski poles (which can also be used).

If going into deep snow, snowshoers will often take along gaiters to keep snow from getting into their boots from above. Some manufacturers make their snowshoes with boot or toe covers to provide the same protection.

A carrier of some type is also advisable, particularly if the trip will not take place entirely on snowshoes. Some backpack manufacturers have designed special packs with "daisy chains," strips of looped nylon webbing on which the shoes can be secured. Snowshoe manufacturers, too, have begun including carriers and tote bags for their products, if for no other reason than to prevent the often-sharp cleats on the bottom from damaging surfaces they come in contact with.

== Techniques employed with snowshoes ==
Snowshoeing

Snowshoes function best when there is enough snow beneath them to pack a layer between them and the ground, usually at a depth of 8 inches (20 cm) or more. However, contrary to popular belief, snowshoes perform poorly on very icy and steep terrain. Compared to crampons, entry level modern snowshoes give relatively little grip on ice. It is common for novice snowshoers to climb up a steep slope to a summit and then have difficulty climbing back down, which tends to be more difficult than ascending. In icy conditions mountaineering skills and snowshoes designed for Alpine and glacial travel are required.

=== Walking ===
The method of walking is to lift the shoes slightly and, with wider snowshoes, slide their inner edges over each other, thus avoiding the unnatural and fatiguing "straddle-gait".

==== Turning ====
Walking skills are easily transferable to straightforward snowshoe travel, but this is not always the case with turning around. While a snowshoer with space to do so can, and usually does, simply walk in a small semicircle, on a steep slope or in close quarters such as a boreal forest this may be impractical or impossible. It is thus necessary in such circumstances to execute a "kick turn" similar to the one employed on skis: lifting one foot high enough to keep the entire snowshoe in the air while keeping the other planted, putting the foot at a right angle to the other (or as close as possible for the situation and the snowshoer's physical comfort), then planting it on the snow and quickly repeating the action with the other foot. This is much easier to accomplish with poles.

==== Ascending ====
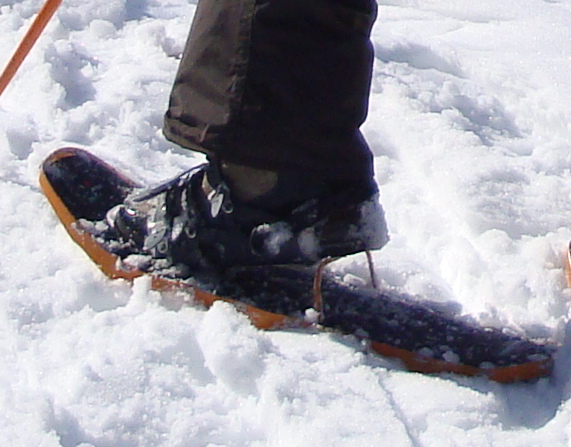
Some modern snowshoes have bars that can be flipped up for ascending steep slopes. The wearer's heel can rest on the bar.

While the cleating and traction improvements to modern snowshoes have greatly enhanced snowshoers' climbing abilities, on very steep slopes it is still beneficial to make "kick steps," kicking the toes of the shoes into the snow to create a kind of snow stairs for the next traveler to use.

Alternatively, snowshoers can use two techniques borrowed from skis: the herringbone (walking uphill with the shoes spread outward at an angle to increase their support) and the sidestep.

For those snowshoers who use poles, it can be easier to rely on the poles to 'pull' oneself with regular stride, up the slope.

==== Descending ====
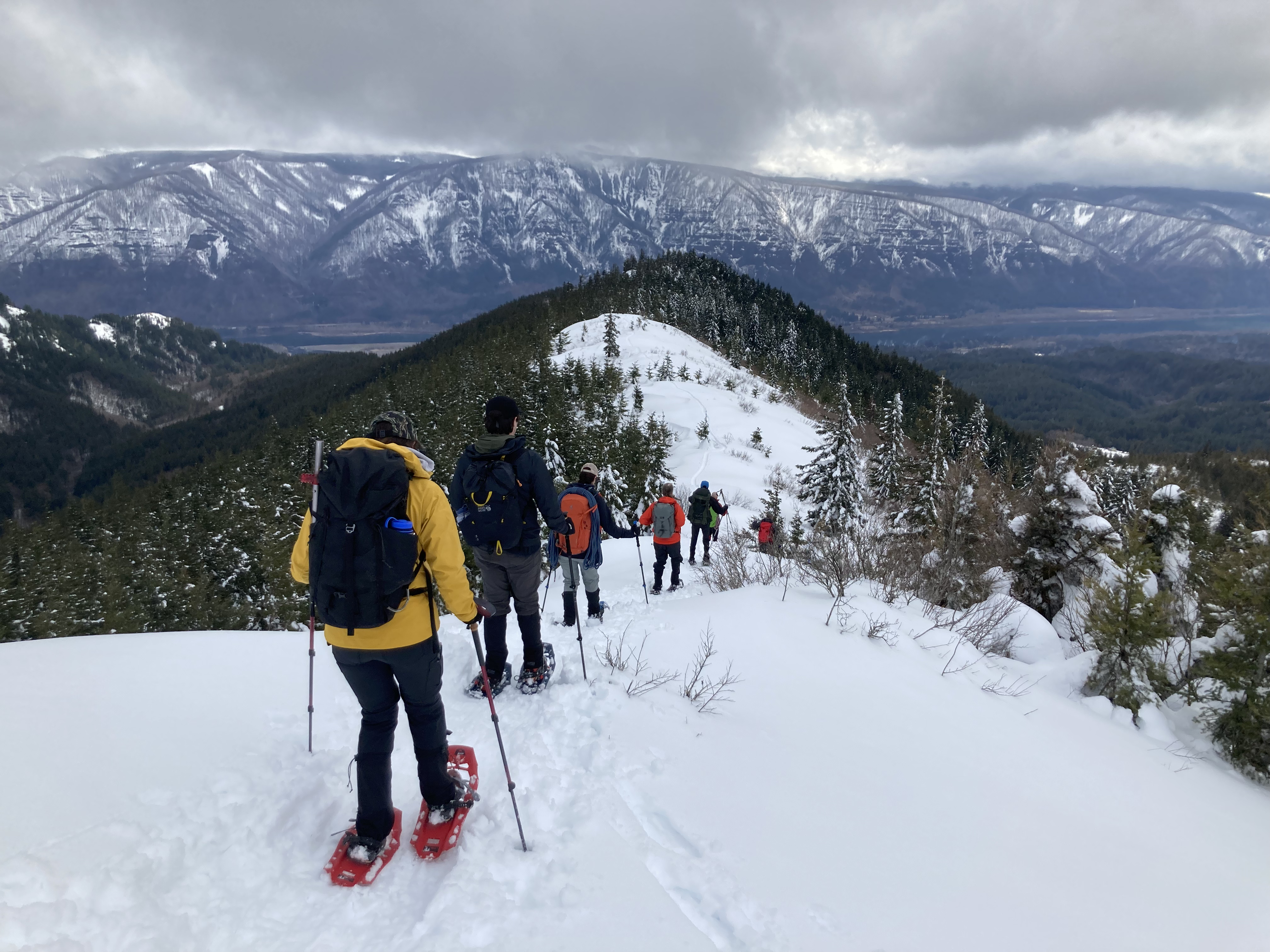
A Mazamas group descends Hardy Ridge in Beacon Rock State Park

Once a trail has been broken up a mountain or hill, snowshoers often find a way to speed up the return trip that manages to also be fun and rests the leg muscles: glissading the trail, or sliding down on their buttocks. This does not damage the trail, and in fact helps pack the snow better for later users.

In situations where they must break trail downhill and thus cannot glissade, snowshoers sometimes run downhill in exaggerated steps, sliding slightly on the snow as they do, an option sometimes called "step sliding". Also effective, are poles placed in front as you descend in a regular stride. If carrying poles and properly experienced, they can also employ skiing techniques such as telemarking.

=== Adverse effects ===
Immoderate snowshoeing may lead to serious lameness of the feet and ankles due to the abnormal gait required to lift the snowshoe over the surface of the snow. Canadian voyageurs called this phenomenon mal de raquette, or "snowshoe sickness". This can potentially be very dangerous for a snowshoer stricken in a remote area. Although modern snowshoes are much lighter and more comfortable, making mal de raquette rarer, it is still a danger for those who use snowshoes extensively. In the past, snowshoers have carried pain relief medications such as tramadol to allow for easier movement of the legs in such an emergency situation.

Nonetheless, many snowshoers find that their legs, particularly their calf muscles, take some time to get used to snowshoeing again at the start of each winter. Frequently the first serious trip leaves them sore for several days afterwards.

In rotten snow, bridging traditional snowshoes (placing them so that they are supported only at the ends) can cause them to break. A lack of snowshoes can be life-threatening if it unexpectedly strands the snowshoer far from help.

=== Winter recreation ===
The resurgence of interest in snowshoeing in the late 20th century was in some part due to snowboarders, who took to them as a way to reach backcountry powder bowls and other areas while they were still banned from most ski areas. Their similarities to snowboards, in shape and binding, led many of them to continue use even after snowboarders were allowed to use most ski slopes. Despite most ski areas now allowing snowboarders, there is a growing interest in backcountry and sidecountry snowboarding in the search for fresh powder. The recent development of splitboards has enabled snowboarders to access backcountry without the need for snowshoes.

Downhill skiers, too, found snowshoes useful in reaching the same areas.

Another popular expedition, particularly among hikers, is the "ski-shoe" trip combining a cross-country ski portion on a level, wide trail with a snowshoe up a less skiable section.

=== Competition ===
Runners have found that using light snowshoes allows them to continue exercising and racing during winter. Like their warm-weather counterparts, events cover all distances, from sprints of 100 m to the 100 km "Iditashoe". There are even hurdle events.

Snowshoe segments have become common in many multi-sport events and adventure races, including a required snowshoe segment in the winter quadrathlon. Some competitors in those events like Sally Edwards and Tom Sobal have emerged as stars.

While snowshoe racing has probably been around as long as there have been snowshoes, as an organized sport it is relatively new. The United States Snowshoe Association was founded in 1977 to serve as a governing body for competitive snowshoeing. It is headquartered in Corinth, New York, which considers itself the "Snowshoe Capital of the World" as a result. Similar organizations, such as the European Snowshoe Committee and Japan's Chikyu Network, exist in other countries and there is an international competitive level as well.

Snowshoe races are part of the Arctic Winter Games and the winter Special Olympics. However, they are not yet an Olympic event.

== Maintenance and repair ==
The rawhide webbing of traditional snowshoes, as noted above, needs regular waterproofing. Spar varnish is the preferred waterproofing for traditional snowshoes. A light sanding is preferred before 3 coats of spar varnish is applied. Modern snowshoes need no regular maintenance save a sharpening of cleats if desired.

Both kinds of snowshoe, however, can and do break. The most common damage suffered is to the frame, which can be splinted with a stick or piece of wood if necessary. Decking rarely gets broken, but if it is punctured and the hole looks as if it might continue to grow, the best solution is the patching kits made for tents.

Cable ties can serve many purposes in repairing snowshoes. They can splint frames in a pinch, replace a broken rivet, secure a tie or lace, and repair winter clothing as well.

== See also ==
- List of shoe styles
- Winter sports
- The Snowshoers (Les Raquetteurs)
