= Corn Holm =

Small tidal island in Orkney, near Copinsay

Coordinates: 58°54′3″N 2°41′55″W

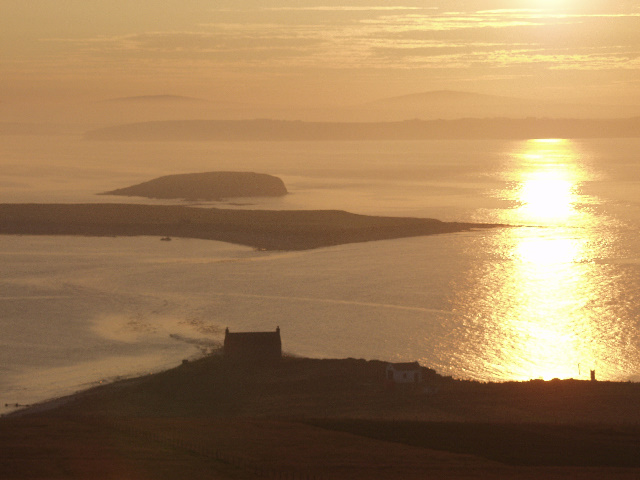
Corn Holm seen from Copinsay. Black Holm can be seen beyond it, and in the distance the parish of Deerness on Mainland, Orkney

Corn Holm is a small tidal island in Orkney, near Copinsay to the west, off the north-eastern coast of Scotland. There was once a small chapel there, and it is covered in birdlife.

== Geography and geology ==
Corn Holm is made up of red sandstone. At low tide it is connected to Black Holm and Ward Holm, and is connected to Copinsay by a stretch called "Isle Rough". The sections north and south of Isle Rough are known as North and South Bay.
