= Tankerness =

Coordinates: 58.95°N 2.85°W

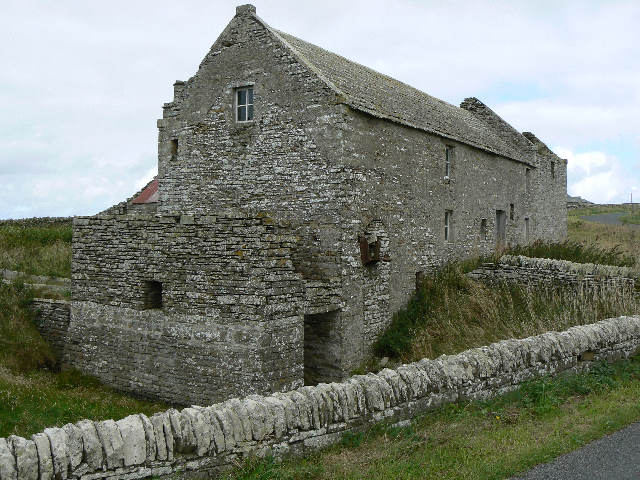
- Disused grain mill at Tankerness

- Location within Orkney
- OS grid reference: HY511072
- Civil parish: St Andrews
- Council area: Orkney
- Lieutenancy area: Orkney
- Country: Scotland
- Sovereign state: United Kingdom
- Post town: ORKNEY
- Postcode district: KW17
- Dialling code: 01856
- Police: Scotland
- Fire: Scottish
- Ambulance: Scottish
- UK Parliament: Orkney and Shetland
- Scottish Parliament: Orkney

Tankerness is a district in the St Andrews parish in Mainland, Orkney, Scotland. Essentially a peninsula, it is about 13 kilometres (8 mi) south-east of Kirkwall and 1 kilometre (0.6 mi) east of Kirkwall Airport. The origin of the place name is uncertain, but it may derive from the Norse personal name "Tannskári". A "ness" is a promontory.

== Geography ==
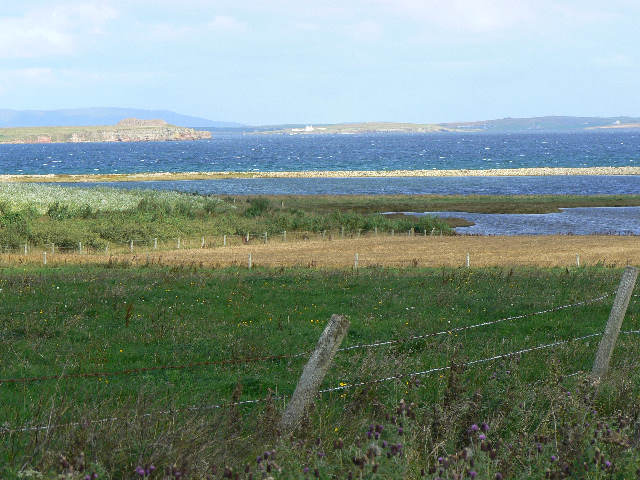
The Long Ayre

Tankerness is bounded to the north and west by Inganess Bay, to the east by Deer Sound, and to the south by the A960. Inganess Bay and Deer Sound meet at the prominent headland of Rerwick Head. Loch of Tankerness, which is just under 1 square kilometre (247 acres) in size, lies in the central area. The landscape is more gentle than the hilly terrain to the west and is fertile farmland. Bordering Inganess Bay is the Long Ayre, a kilometer-long gravel tombolo enclosing a tidal pool.

== Geology ==
The Tankerness peninsula is underlain by Rousay flagstones, an Old Red Sandstone of Middle Devonian age, that were deposited in Lake Orcadie. These lacustrine rocks were laid down when the land that now forms Orkney was 16 degrees south of the equator within the Southern Hemisphere's desert belt. The flagstones show a marked cyclicity in their sedimentation, which is interpreted as representing regular climatically driven changes in lake level caused by Milankovitch cyclicity.

== Prehistory ==
A charred hazelnut shell, recovered during the excavations at Longhowe in 2007, has been dated to 6820–6660 BC. This pushed back the earliest confirmed date of the occupation of Orkney by 3,000 years.

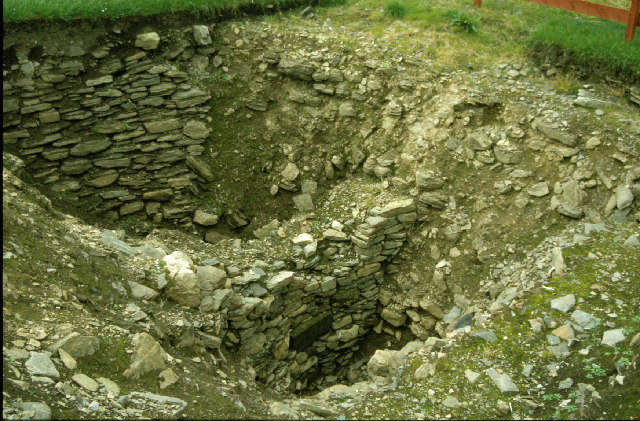
Mine Howe excavations

Mine Howe, at Toab in the south of Tankerness, is a prehistoric subterranean man-made chamber dug into a large mound. Its walls are lined with stones fitted to form an arch over the cavity and 29 steps lead to a rock floor. These steps descend to a half-landing where they turn back on themselves and a further steps descend to a chamber. This chamber is only about 1.3 metres (4.3 ft) in diameter but is over 4 metres (13 ft) high and has a corbelled roof. The mound is surrounded by a substantial causewayed ditch. The origin of the howe (from Old Norse word haugr meaning barrow) is not perfectly understood, although it is thought to date from the Iron Age. There is some similarity to the well inside the Broch of Gurness.

The Howie of the Manse is a ruined broch on the southern shore of Loch of Tankerness. Further east at Taing of Beeman there is a scattered prehistoric settlement, the remains of which are of unknown provenance.

In 1867 at nearby Groatsetter the fringed woollen Orkney Hood was discovered lying in peat. It has thought to date from the late Iron Age and may be the oldest textile ever found in Britain. (Note: A piece of twine made of vegetable fibres found at Etton, Cambridgeshire, may date from the Neolithic.)

== History ==
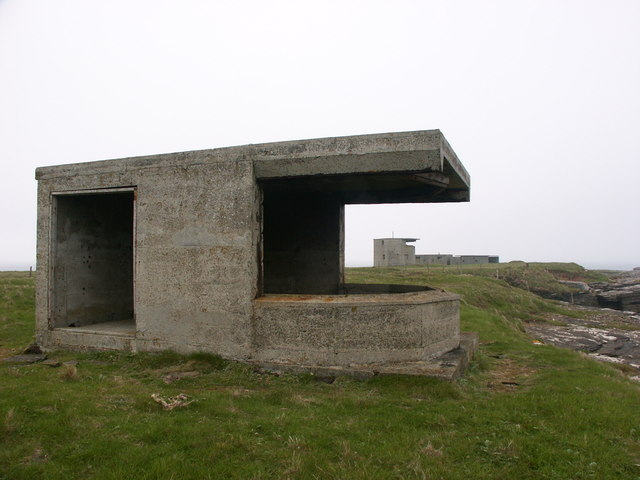
World War II searchlight housing at Rerwick Head

The Orkney Museum is located in Tankerness House, Kirkwall. This town house was acquired by James Baikie of Tankerness in 1641. Baikie was a successful Kirkwall merchant and a descendant of Paul Baikie, navigator to King Håkon IV of Norway.

To the south of Loch of Tankerness, is the Hall of Tankerness. This is a 19th-century farm steading on the site of the 12th-century drinking hall of Erling of Tankerness. Nearby is a pier, once used by the herring fleets.

Rerwick Head is the site of a Second World War battery. A variety of concrete buildings remain, including those that housed two six-inch guns salvaged from the battleship HMS Iron Duke. The guns, supported by powerful searchlights, guarded the approaches to Shapinsay Sound.

== Wildlife ==
The Greenland white-fronted goose is occasionally seen at Loch of Tankerness. In the 1960s, 50–100 geese were regularly found there in the winter but there has been a sharp decline in numbers since 1974/75, probably as a result of reclamation of moorland and an increase in shooting in the area.

The decline at this site matches an increase in the size of the wintering flock on Stronsay.

== See also ==
- Baron Wallace of Tankerness
