= Mine Howe =

Coordinates: 58.938766°N 2.852267°W

Mine Howe is an Iron Age subterranean man-made chamber dug 6 meters (20 feet) deep inside a large mound. It is located in the Tankerness area of Orkney, Scotland, about 5 miles (8 km) southeast of Kirkwall, the capital of Orkney. The origin of the howe (from Old Norse word haugr meaning barrow) is not perfectly understood. Experts believe that it was built roughly 2000 years ago during the Iron Age. There is some similarity to the well inside the Iron Age Broch of Gurness.

== Description ==
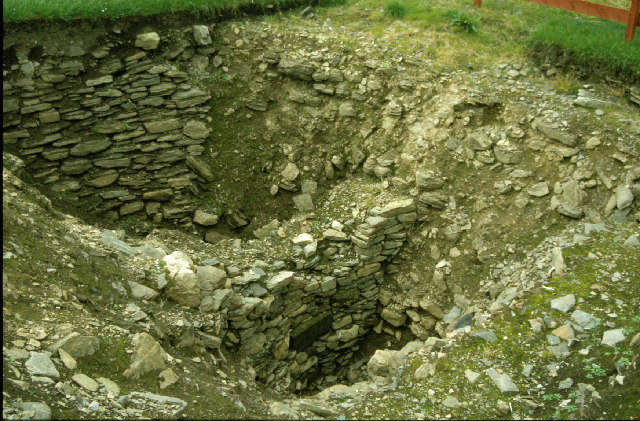
Mine Howe excavations

Its walls are lined with stones fitted to form an arch over the cavity and 29 steps lead to a rock floor. The entrance is at the top of the small hill and there are indications of other Iron Age and earlier activity around the site. A flight of stone steps descend to a half-landing where they turn back on themselves and further steps descend to a chamber. This chamber is only about 1.3 metres (4 ft 3 in) in diameter but is over four metres high with a corbelled roof. The bottom step into this chamber is 0.9 metres (2 ft 11 in) high and gives it a cistern-like appearance. At the half-landing two subsidiary chambers/passages open out, one above the other. Most of the structure is lined with beautifully built dry-stone walling.

== Discovery ==
It was first explored in 1946 and misidentified as an Iron Age broch. After the 1940s excavations were finished, Mine Howe was covered over and left untouched and nearly forgotten for almost 50 years. Douglas Paterson, a farmer who owned the land at the time, rediscovered the site in 1999. He removed material that had filled in during the intervening years and built a small wooden entrance over the opening. He built stairs leading down into the chamber and allowed visitors inside.

In June 2000, the archaeological television programme Time Team came to Mine Howe to help with further excavations and explore the structure. In order to work out how it had been built, Time Team had a small replica built nearby. Sections of a ditch surrounding the mound were also excavated, along with what was apparently an earthen path allowing visitors access to the site. No firm conclusions have been made about the age or the purpose of Mine Howe.

== See also ==
- Broch of Gurness
