= Deerness =

Part of Orkney, Scotland

Coordinates: 58°56′45″N 2°45′15″W

Deerness: Scots: Derness; Dyrnes
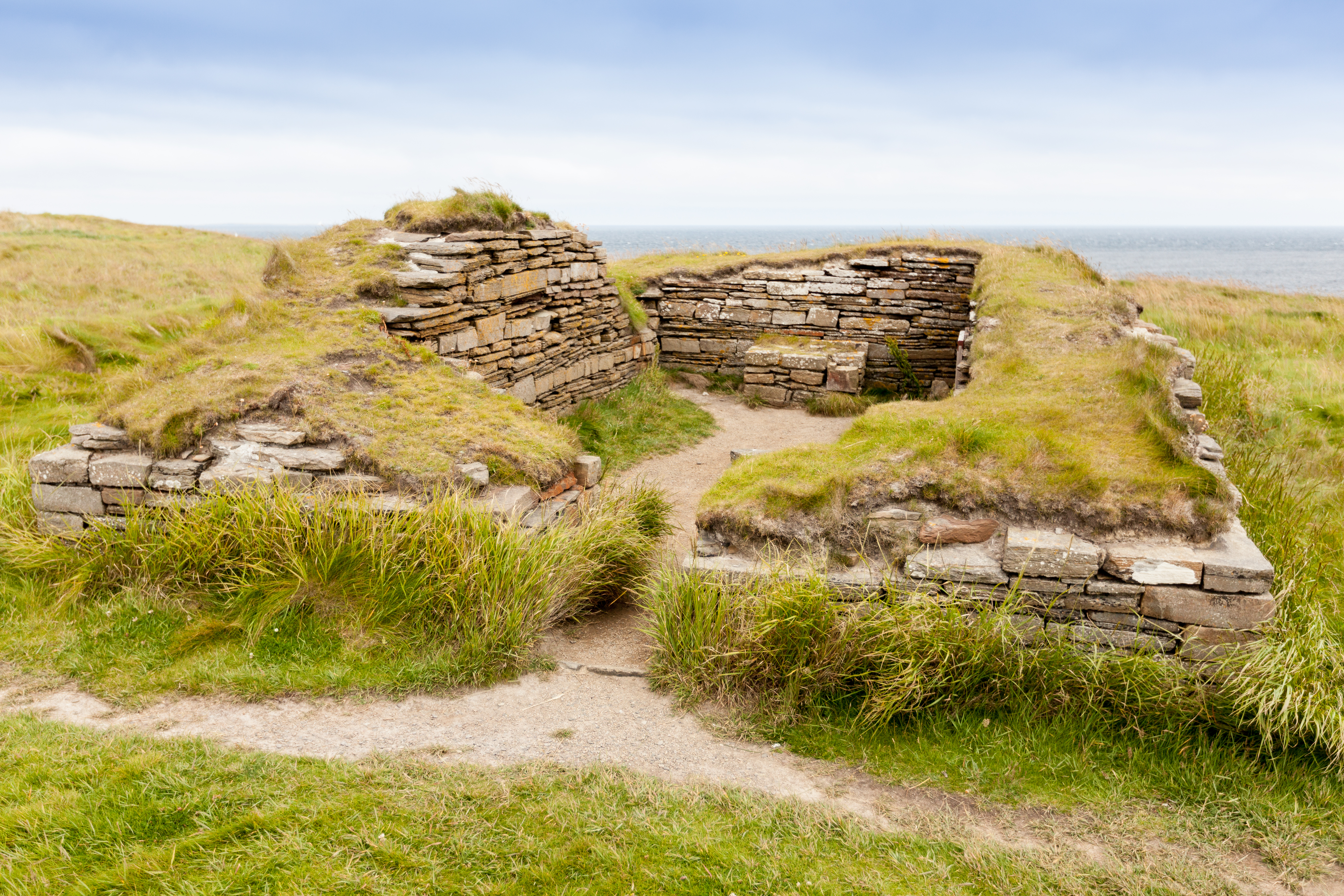
- Brough of Deerness showing the remains of the chapel

- Location within Scotland
- Council area: Orkney Islands Council
- Country: Scotland
- Sovereign state: United Kingdom
- Police: Scotland
- Fire: Scottish
- Ambulance: Scottish

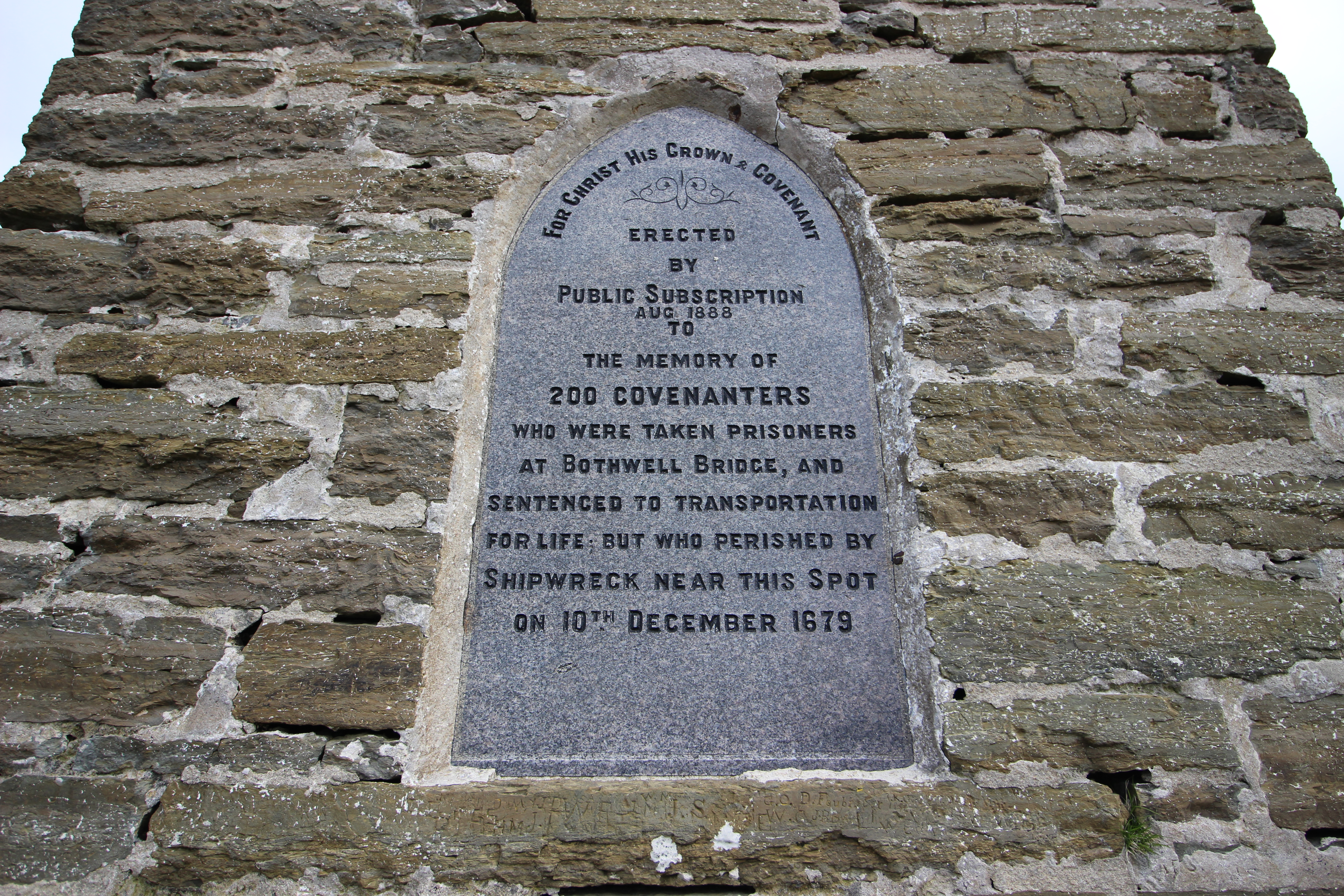
Covenanters' monument detail

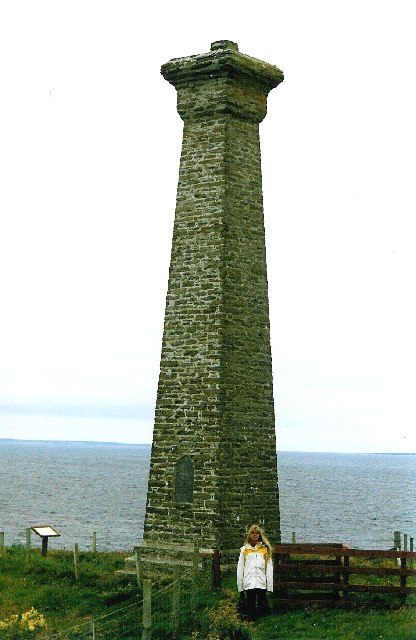
Covenanters' Memorial, Deerness. A memorial to 200 covenanters who drowned when their prison ship foundered in a storm.

Deerness (/ˈdɪərnɪs/, locally /ˈdɛrnɪs/, Old Norse: Dyrnes) is a quoad sacra parish (i.e. one created and functioning for ecclesiastical purposes only) and peninsula in Mainland, Orkney, Scotland. It is about 13.5 kilometres (8.4 mi) south east of Kirkwall. Deerness forms a part of the civil parish of St Andrews and Deerness. There is a shop/post office and a community centre and the Deerness Distillery.

Deerness is connected to the rest of the Orkney Mainland by a narrow isthmus, known as Dingieshowe. Deerness parish consists chiefly of the peninsula, but also takes in its surrounding islets of Copinsay, the Horse of Copinsay and Corn Holm. The Brough of Deerness is the site of an early Christian monastery near the north eastern tip of the peninsula. The Gloup is a sea-cave approximately 40 metres (44 yd) long and 25 metres (82 ft) deep just south of the Brough.

== The Crown of London shipwreck ==
The Covenanter's Memorial at Deerness, commemorating the loss in a shipwreck of 200 covenanters en route to the New World of America (as a punishment), was largely paid for by Robert Halliday Gunning. The inscription on the monument reads "For Christ His Crown Covenant, erected by public subscription Aug. 1888 to the memory of the 200 covenanters who were taken prisoners at Bothwell Bridge, and sentence to transportation for life; but who perished by shipwreck near this spot on 10th December 1679."

John Blackadder recorded that a prisoner related the following:

"The prisoners were all shipped in Leith Roads (15 November) in an English captain's vessel to be carried to America. He was a profane cruel wretch, and used them barbarously, stowing them up between decks, where they could not get up their heads except to sit or lean, and robbing them of many things their friends sent them for their relief. They never were in such strait and pinch, particularly through scorching drought, as they were allowed little or no drink, and pent up together, till many of them fainted, and were almost suffocated. This was in Leith Roads [i.e., before they sailed] besides what straits they would readily endure in the custody of such a cruel wretch. In this grievous plight, these captives were carried away in much anguish of spirit, pinched bodies, and disquieted conscience, (at least those who had taken the bond.) They were tossed at sea with great tempest of weather for three weeks, till at last their ship cast anchor, to ride awhile among the Orkney isles, till the storm might calm. But after casting anchor, the ship did drive with great violence upon a rugged shore about the isles, and struck about ten at night on a rock. The cruel captain saw the hazard all were in, and that they might have escaped, as some did; yet, as I heard, he would not open the hatches to let the poor prisoners fend for themselves. He, with his seamen, made their escape by a mast laid over between the ship and the rock ashore. Some leapt on the rock. The ship being strong, endured several strokes ere she bilged. The captain, and all the rest of the seamen, with about fifty prisoners, some of whom had been above deck before, others had broke out some other way, down to the den, and so up again, so that they wan to land with their life in; one or two died ashore. While these were thus escaping, the rest, who had all been closed up between decks, crying most pitifully, and working, as they could, to break forth of their prison, but to little purpose; and all these, near two hundred, with lamentable shrieks of dying men, (as was related to the writer by one who escaped,) did perish. The most part were cast out on the shore dead, and after buried by the country people. It was found, by some who examined those that escaped, that many of them had refused to take the bond. Yet a few of those who had not taken it were drowned; albeit this is soberly marked because these outward things fall much alike to all. It was, however, a puzzling dispensation like many others."

== Deerness Folklore ==
In the early 1890s an unidentified creature visited Newark Bay on Deerness 'and was seen by hundreds of sightseers'. It came to be known as the Deerness Mermaid. There is also a selkie legend associated with the parish.

== Notable people ==
- Edwin Muir, born in Deerness in 1887.
