= St Andrews, Orkney =

Human settlement in the Orkney Islands, United Kingdom

Coordinates: 58°57′26″N 2°51′45″W

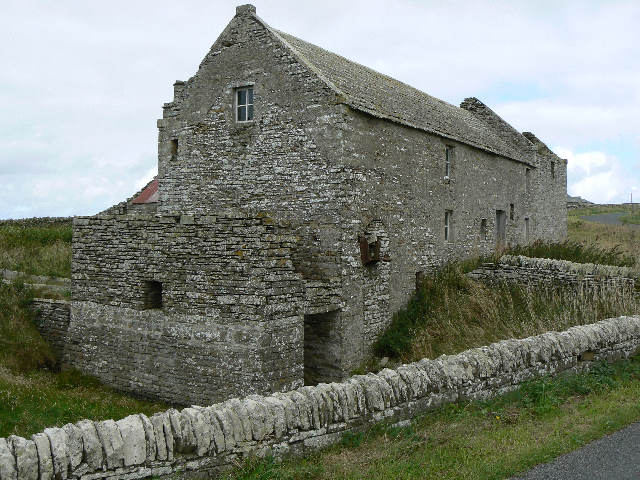
Disused grain mill at Tankerness

St Andrews is a parish on Mainland, Orkney in Scotland. It is located east of the town of Kirkwall and the parish of St Ola and lies north of Holm and west of Deerness. The settlements of Tankerness, Toab and Foubister are in the parish, as is Kirkwall Airport.

Saint Andrews is on the east side of Mainland, and extends from the eastern boundary of Kirkwall parish to the sea, and includes the island of Kirkholm.

The land is mostly flat, but has diversities of surface, and rises nowhere higher than 350 ft. The coast includes both sandy beach and precipitous rock, and has a large sea cavern.
