= Football at the 2025 Island Games – Men's tournament =

Men's Football at the Island Games 2025

Tournament details
- Host country: Orkney
- Teams: 10
- Venue: 7

Final positions
- Champions: Bermuda U23 (2nd title)
- Runners-up: Ynys Môn
- Third place: Isle of Man

Tournament statistics
- Matches played: 19
- Goals scored: 80 (4.21 per match)

The 2025 Island Games in Orkney is the seventeenth edition in which a football tournament was played at the multi-games competition.

== Participants ==
- Åland
- Bermuda U23
- Frøya
- Gozo
- Hitra Municipality
- Isle of Man
- Isle of Wight
- Jersey
- Orkney
- Shetland
- Western Isles
- Ynys Môn

== Venues ==
Ground	Parish
Kirkwall Grammar School	Kirkwall
Firth Primary School	Finstown
Dounby Community Centre	Dounby
Stromness Academy	Stromness
Rendall Community Centre	Rendall
Holm Pitch	Holm

== Group phase ==
The group stage began on 13 July.

=== Group A ===
Pos	Team	Pld	W	D	L	GF	GA	GD	Pts	Qualification
1	Isle of Man	3	3	0	0	20	4	+16	9	Final Stage
2	Orkney (H)	3	2	0	1	7	5	+2	6	
3	Hitra Municipality	3	1	0	2	10	10	0	3	
4	Frøya	3	0	0	3	1	19	−18	0	

Updated to match(es) played on 16 July 2025. Source:
Rules for classification: Group stage tiebreakers
(H) Hosts
13 July 2025
12:00

Hitra Municipality	2–7	Isle of Man
Bjerkan 10' (pen.), 21'	Report	Jones 2'; Simpson 7'; Callister 19'; Doyle 32', 80', 84'; Gale 63'

Firth Primary School, Finstown
13 July 2025
19:00

Orkney	3–0	Frøya
Scott 10'; Ewing 15'; Young 83'	Report

Kirkwall Grammar School, Kirkwall

14 July 2025
15:30

Orkney	3–2	Hitra Municipality
Foubister 21'; Ewing 58'; Delday 66'	Report	Kirkness 11' (o.g.); Bjerkan 31'

Kirkwall Grammar School, Kirkwall
14 July 2025
19:00

Isle of Man	10–1	Frøya
Callister 10', 42'; Nilsen 18' (o.g.); Gelling 29'; Doyle 30', 37'; Bergquist 57'; Jones 62'; Pickering 77'; Gale 81'	Report	Sandvik 64'

Dounby Community Centre, Dounby

15 July 2025
19:00

Orkney	1–3	Isle of Man
Foubister 87' (pen.)	Report	Doyle 41'; Brown 68'; Pickering 75'

Kirkwall Grammar School, Kirkwall
15 July 2025
19:00

Frøya	0–6	Hitra Municipality
	Report	Olsen 1'; Glørstad 2'; Hammerhaug Selvåg 20', 90+5'; Selvåg 82'; Andersen 89'

Firth Primary School, Finstown

=== Group B ===
Pos	Team	Pld	W	D	L	GF	GA	GD	Pts	Qualification
1	Jersey	2	1	1	0	4	2	+2	4	Final Stage
2	Shetland	2	0	2	0	2	2	0	2	
3	Gozo	2	0	1	1	0	2	−2	1	

Updated to match(es) played on 16 July 2025. Source:
Rules for classification: Group stage tiebreakers
13 July 2025
15:30

Gozo	0–0	Shetland
	Report
Penalties
	4-3

Kirkwall Grammar School, Kirkwall

14 July 2025
12:00

Jersey	2–0	Gozo
Martins-Figueira 24'; Moon 35'	Report

Holm Pitch, Holm

15 July 2025
19:00

Jersey	2–2	Shetland
Brodie 29'; Maher 32'	Report	McNiven 39'; Maver 83'

Kirkwall Grammar School, Kirkwall

=== Group C ===
Pos	Team	Pld	W	D	L	GF	GA	GD	Pts	Qualification
1	Bermuda U23	2	1	1	0	4	2	+2	4	Final Stage
2	Ynys Môn	2	1	1	0	3	2	+1	4	Final Stage
3	Western Isles	2	0	0	2	0	3	−3	0	

Updated to match(es) played on 16 July 2025. Source:
Rules for classification: Group stage tiebreakers
13 July 2025
12:00

Western Isles	0–2	Bermuda U23
	Report	Joseph 47'; Mills 69'

Rendall Community Centre, Rendall

14 July 2025
19:00

Ynys Môn	1–0	Western Isles
Smith 90'	Report

Rendall Community Centre, Rendall

15 July 2025
19:00

Ynys Môn	2–2	Bermuda U23
Morris 11', 18'	Report	Christian 22'; Jennings 90+1'

Stromness Academy, Stromness

== Placement Playoff Matches ==
=== 9th Place Match ===
17 July 2025
15:30

Hitra Municipality	3–0	Frøya
	Report

Holm Pitch, Holm

=== 7th Place Match ===
17 July 2025
15:30

Gozo	3–3	Western Isles
Njoku 4'; Nunes Santos 17', 19'	Report	Jones 21'; McDonald 82'; Mutch 86'
Penalties
	3–1

Dounby Community Centre, Dounby

=== 5th Place Match ===
17 July 2025
19:00

Orkney	3–2	Shetland
Scott 9'; Young 44', 45'	Report	Clubb 42'; Regan 82'

Stromness Academy, Stromness

== Final Stage ==
=== Bracket ===
Semi-finals
17 July – Kirkwall Grammar School
Isle of Man	0
Ynys Môn	1
17 July – Kirkwall Grammar School
Jersey	2
Bermuda U23	3

Final
18 July – Kirkwall Grammar School
Ynys Môn	1
Bermuda U23	3
Third place
18 July – Kirkwall Grammar School
Isle of Man	3
Jersey	2

=== Semi-finals ===
17 July 2025
17:00

Isle of Man	0–1	Ynys Môn
	Report	Morris 39' (pen.)

Kirkwall Grammar School, Kirkwall

17 July 2025
17:00

Jersey	2–3 (a.e.t.)	Bermuda U23
Moon 20'; Cassidy 105'	Report	Armstrong 84'; Mills 118'; Donawa 120'

Kirkwall Grammar School, Kirkwall

=== Third place match ===
18 July 2025
14:30

Isle of Man	3–2	Jersey

Kirkwall Grammar School, Kirkwall

=== Final ===
18 July 2025
15:30

Ynys Môn	1–3	Bermuda U23

Kirkwall Grammar School, Kirkwall

2025 Island Games Winners
Bermuda U23

1st Title
