= John M. Mason =

John M. Mason may refer to:

- John Mason (Australian politician) (born 1928), Australian politician
- John M. Mason (musician) (1940–2011), Scottish solicitor, musician, composer and conductor
- John M. Mason (theologian) (1770–1829), American preacher and theologian
- John Monck Mason (1726–1809), Irish politician and literary scholar

== See also ==
- John Mason (disambiguation)
