= John Mason =

John Mason may refer to:

== Arts and entertainment ==
- John Mason (playwright) (fl. 1609), British playwright
- John Mason (poet) (1646–1694), English clergyman, poet, and hymn-writer
- John B. Mason (1858–1919), American stage actor
- John Mason (artist) (1927–2019), American ceramic artist
- Ralph Mason (John Francis Mason, 1938–2016), English tenor
- John M. Mason (musician) (1940–2011), Scottish solicitor, musician, composer and conductor

== Business and industry ==
- John Mason (planter) (1766–1849), American banker and planter, son of George Mason
- John Mason (businessman) (1773–1839), American banker
- John Charles Mason (1798–1881), British East India Company secretary and diplomat
- John Landis Mason (1832–1902), American tinsmith; patented glass-threaded mason jars for food preservation

== Law and politics ==
=== Ireland ===
- Sir John Mason (died 1720), Irish MP for County Waterford
- John Mason (died 1738), Irish MP for the city of Waterford
- John Monck Mason (1726–1809), Irish politician and literary scholar

=== U.K. ===
- John Mason (15th-century MP), Member of Parliament for Lewes and East Grinstead
- Sir John Mason (diplomat, born 1503) (1503–1566), British diplomat and spy
- John Mason (governor) (1586–1635), founder of the Province of New Hampshire and governor of Newfoundland
- Sir John Mason (diplomat, born 1927) (1927–2008), UK High Commissioner to Australia
- John Mason (Scottish politician) (born 1957), Member of Parliament for Glasgow East and Member of the Scottish Parliament for Glasgow Shettleston

=== U.S. ===
- John Thomson Mason (1765–1824), American jurist and Attorney General of Maryland in 1806
- John Thomson Mason (1787–1850), American lawyer, United States marshal
- John Y. Mason (1799–1859), U.S. Representative from Virginia and Secretary of the Navy
- John Calvin Mason (1802–1865), U.S. Representative from Kentucky
- John Thomson Mason Jr. (1815–1873), U.S. Representative from Maryland, son of John Thomson Mason (1765–1824)
- John W. Mason (1842–1917), Commissioner of Internal Revenue and justice of the Supreme Court of Appeals of West Virginia
- John E. Mason (1854–1910), American politician and judge from Virginia

=== Elsewhere ===
- John James Mason (1842–1903), Canadian politician
- John Mason (New Zealand politician) (1880–1975), New Zealand politician
- John Mason (Australian politician) (born 1928), Australian politician

== Military ==
- John Mason (colonist) (1600–1672), Commander of the Connecticut forces in the 1637 Pequot War
- John Mason (master) (fl. 1780s), English master of the Prince of Wales in the First Fleet
- John S. Mason (1824–1897), Union general in the American Civil War

== Science and medicine ==
- John Alden Mason (1885–1967), American archaeological anthropologist and linguist
- John Mason (meteorologist) (1923–2015), British meteorologist
- John Wayne Mason (1924–2014), American physiologist and stress researcher

== Sports ==
- Jack Mason (John Richard Mason, 1874–1958), English cricketer
- John Mason (American football) (fl. 1920s–1950s), American college football player and coach
- John Mason (soccer) (born 1953), Scottish-American soccer defender
- John Mason (cricketer) (born 1984), English cricketer
- John Mason (runner) (born 1987), Canadian long-distance runner
- John Mason (announcer), American sports announcer

== Others ==
- John Mason (minister) (1706–1763), English nonconformist minister and author
- John M. Mason (theologian) (1770–1829), American preacher and theologian
- John Mason (outlaw) (died 1866), American bushwhacker and bandit
- John Mason (historian) (1920–2009), British historian and Oxford academic
- John Mason (schoolmaster) (1945–2023), Indian educationist

== Other uses ==
- John Mason School, a secondary school in Abingdon, UK
- 6092 Johnmason, minor planet named for the British astronomer John Mason

== See also ==
- Mason (surname)
- John Thomson Mason (disambiguation)
- Jonathan Mason (disambiguation)
