= List of listed buildings in Stromness, Orkney =

This is a list of listed buildings in the parish of Stromness in Orkney, Scotland.

== List ==
Name	Location	Date Listed	Grid Ref. (Note: Sometimes known as OSGB36, the grid reference (where provided) is based on the British national grid reference system used by the Ordnance Survey. • "Guide to National Grid". Ordnance Survey. • "Get-a-map". Ordnance Survey.)	Geo-coordinates	Notes	LB Number (Note: Historic Environment Scotland assign a unique alphanumeric identifier to each designated site in Scotland, for listed buildings this always begins with "LB", for example "LB12345".)	Image
24 And 26 John Street				58°57′53″N 3°17′49″W	Category C(S)	45529	Upload Photo
1 Franklin Road, Including Boundary Wall With Entrance, And Outbuilding				58°57′53″N 3°17′57″W	Category C(S)	45364	Upload Photo
12 Franklin Road				58°57′42″N 3°18′03″W	Category C(S)	45367	Upload Photo
14-20 (Even Nos) Franklin Road, Including Boundary Walls, Railings And Outbuilding				58°57′40″N 3°18′03″W	Category C(S)	45377	Upload Photo
20 And 22 Graham Place, Including Boundary Wall And Outbuilding				58°57′40″N 3°17′58″W	Category C(S)	45393	Upload Photo
33 And 35 Graham Place, The Hamnavoe Restaurant				58°57′40″N 3°18′01″W	Category C(S)	45394	Upload Photo
39 Graham Place				58°57′41″N 3°18′02″W	Category C(S)	45395	Upload Photo
30 John Street				58°57′53″N 3°17′47″W	Category C(S)	45402	Upload Photo
87 John Street, Including Outbuilding And Walled Garden				58°57′56″N 3°17′46″W	Category C(S)	45404	Upload Photo
8 North End Road				58°57′59″N 3°17′44″W	Category C(S)	45411	Upload Photo
78-86 (Even Nos) Victoria Street, Including Quay And Slipway				58°57′45″N 3°17′56″W	Category C(S)	45443	Upload Photo
108-110 (Even Nos) Victoria Street				58°57′43″N 3°17′57″W	Category C(S)	45444	Upload Photo
15 And 17 Alfred Street Including Boundary Walls, Gatepiers And Railings				58°57′32″N 3°18′04″W	Category C(S)	45330	Upload Photo
49 And 51 Alfred Street				58°57′31″N 3°18′04″W	Category C(S)	45331	Upload Photo
65 Alfred Street				58°57′29″N 3°18′05″W	Category C(S)	45334	Upload Photo
69 Alfred Street				58°57′28″N 3°18′05″W	Category B	45335	Upload Photo
3, 4 And 5 Alfred Terrace				58°57′29″N 3°18′07″W	Category C(S)	45346	Upload Photo
8 Victoria Street, Orkney Tourist Office				58°57′49″N 3°17′50″W	Category B	41790	Upload another image
36-42 (Even Nos) John Street, Speedings, (The Lieutenant's House), Including Walled Garden				58°57′56″N 3°17′46″W	Category B	41795	Upload another image
3 And 4 Khyber Pass, Including Walled Garden And Outbuilding				58°57′39″N 3°18′01″W	Category C(S)	41798	Upload Photo
2-12 (Even Nos) Ness Road, The Double Houses, Including Quay And Walled Garden				58°57′19″N 3°18′01″W	Category B	41808	Upload another image
46 And 48 Dundas Street, Including Boundary Wall, And Slipway				58°57′37″N 3°18′00″W	Category C(S)	41830	Upload Photo
North Breck, Garth Farm, Including Ancillary Structure And Remnants Of Walled Garden				59°00′06″N 3°19′03″W	Category C(S)	46155	Upload Photo
19 Church Road				58°57′45″N 3°18′00″W	Category C(S)	45352	Upload Photo
40 Dundas Street, Including Walled Garden				58°57′38″N 3°17′59″W	Category C(S)	45361	Upload Photo
22 North End Road, Including Railings, Gatepiers, Outbuilding And Walled Garden				58°58′02″N 3°17′42″W	Category C(S)	45412	Upload Photo
5 Victoria Street, Former Masonic Lodge, Including Railings				58°57′49″N 3°17′52″W	Category C(S)	45429	Upload Photo
49 And 51 Victoria Street, Including Walled Garden				58°57′46″N 3°17′57″W	Category C(S)	45430	Upload Photo
69-73 Victoria Street, Formerly The Commercial Hotel, Including Outbuilding				58°57′45″N 3°17′58″W	Category B	45434	Upload Photo
116 And 118 Victoria Street				58°57′42″N 3°17′57″W	Category B	45446	Upload another image
Victoria Street, Sunderland's Pier, The Bothy, Including Common Quay				58°57′42″N 3°17′56″W	Category C(S)	45447	Upload Photo
124 And 126 Victoria Street, Including Quay				58°57′42″N 3°17′58″W	Category C(S)	45448	Upload Photo
Whitehouse Lane, White House, Outbuildings To Rear				58°57′32″N 3°18′08″W	Category B	45452	Upload Photo
5 And 7 Alfred Street				58°57′33″N 3°18′04″W	Category C(S)	45327	Upload Photo
22 And 24 Alfred Street Including Outbuilding				58°57′30″N 3°18′02″W	Category C(S)	45341	Upload Photo
30-32 (Even Nos) Alfred Street, Former Shellfish Processing Depot, Including Slipway				58°57′29″N 3°18′03″W	Category C(S)	45342	Upload Photo
13 John Street, The Miller's House				58°57′51″N 3°17′52″W	Category B	41791	Upload another image
17 And 18 Hillside Road, Sunnybank, Including Outbuilding And Boundary Wall				58°58′16″N 3°17′39″W	Category C(S)	41796	Upload Photo
6 Melvin Place				58°57′35″N 3°18′04″W	Category B	41803	Upload Photo
81-83 (Odd Nos) Victoria Street				58°57′44″N 3°17′58″W	Category C(S)	41812	Upload Photo
3 Manse Lane, Including Outbuilding And Walled Garden				58°57′43″N 3°17′59″W	Category B	41816	Upload Photo
109, 111 And 113 Victoria Street				58°57′42″N 3°17′59″W	Category C(S)	41820	Upload Photo
2 Alfred Street, The Haven				58°57′34″N 3°18′02″W	Category B	41835	Upload another image
Little Arion, Including Gatepiers, Boundary Walls And Ancillary Structures				59°00′40″N 3°18′02″W	Category C(S)	46157	Upload Photo
Church Road, Town Hall, Former North Kirk, Including Outbuilding, Boundary Walls And Railings				58°57′44″N 3°17′59″W	Category C(S)	45353	Upload Photo
34 Dundas Street, Including Quay And Slipway				58°57′38″N 3°17′59″W	Category C(S)	45359	Upload Photo
3 Franklin Road Including Boundary Walls, Gateway And Garden Railings				58°57′52″N 3°17′58″W	Category C(S)	45365	Upload Photo
12 And 14 Graham Place				58°57′39″N 3°17′59″W	Category C(S)	45392	Upload Photo
5 Hellihole Road, 'Melvin House', Including Boundary Wall Incorporating Outbuilding And Beacon				58°57′38″N 3°18′09″W	Category B	45398	Upload Photo
Victoria Street, The Stromness Hotel, Including Walled Garden				58°57′48″N 3°17′55″W	Category B	45425	Upload another image See more images
132 Victoria Street, Including Quay And Slipway				58°57′41″N 3°17′56″W	Category C(S)	45450	Upload Photo
134 Victoria Street, Including Quay And Slipway				58°57′41″N 3°17′57″W	Category B	45451	Upload Photo
57 And 59 Alfred Street				58°57′30″N 3°18′05″W	Category C(S)	45332	Upload Photo
14 Alfred Street				58°57′31″N 3°18′02″W	Category C(S)	45338	Upload Photo
44 Alfred Street				58°57′29″N 3°18′04″W	Category C(S)	45344	Upload Photo
Back Road, Old North Manse, Including Boundary Walls, Gatepiers And Gates				58°57′46″N 3°18′08″W	Category C(S)	45347	Upload Photo
Back Road, Victoria House Including Boundary Walls And Railings				58°57′54″N 3°17′56″W	Category C(S)	45349	Upload Photo
5 Church Road				58°57′45″N 3°17′59″W	Category C(S)	45350	Upload Photo
84 And 86 Dundas Street				58°57′34″N 3°18′02″W	Category C(S)	41801	Upload Photo
2 Melvin Place, Including Boundary Walls, Gatepiers And Railings				58°57′35″N 3°18′04″W	Category B	41802	Upload another image
38, 40 And 46 Alfred Street, Including Slipways, Quays And Boat Derricks				58°57′28″N 3°18′03″W	Category B	41806	Upload another image
28 Victoria Street, The Pier Arts Centre, Including Quay				58°57′47″N 3°17′53″W	Category B	41809	Upload Photo
1 Manse Lane				58°57′43″N 3°17′58″W	Category B	41815	Upload Photo
78 Dundas Street, Including Outbuilding And Former Quay				58°57′35″N 3°18′03″W	Category B	41831	Upload Photo
1, 3 And 5 Melvin Place				58°57′35″N 3°18′04″W	Category B	41832	Upload Photo
Breckness House				58°57′51″N 3°21′00″W	Category C(S)	18597	Upload Photo
90 Dundas Street				58°57′34″N 3°18′02″W	Category B	45362	Upload Photo
8 Franklin Road And 4 Manse Lane, Including Boundary Wall And Outbuilding				58°57′43″N 3°18′03″W	Category C(S)	45366	Upload Photo
15 Graham Place, 'Alquist', Including Walled Garden And Outbuilding				58°57′42″N 3°18′04″W	Category C(S)	45385	Upload Photo
4 Hellihole Road, Including Outbuildings				58°57′34″N 3°18′05″W	Category C(S)	45400	Upload Photo
5 Hillside Road, Including Boundary Walls And Railings				58°58′11″N 3°17′41″W	Category C(S)	45401	Upload Photo
1 Ness Road, Including Boundary Wall And Gatepiers				58°57′23″N 3°18′04″W	Category C(S)	45407	Upload Photo
Ness Road, Stenigar, Including Boundary Walls And Outbuildings				58°57′11″N 3°17′57″W	Category B	45410	Upload Photo
2 South End, Including Quay				58°57′27″N 3°18′04″W	Category C(S)	45420	Upload Photo
18 And 20 Victoria Street, The Eventide Club And Registrar's Office Respectively				58°57′47″N 3°17′52″W	Category C(S)	45440	Upload Photo
42 Alfred Street				58°57′29″N 3°18′05″W	Category C(S)	45343	Upload Photo
85-91 (Odd Nos) Victoria Street				58°57′43″N 3°17′58″W	Category C(S)	41813	Upload Photo
103, 105 And 107 Victoria Street				58°57′42″N 3°17′59″W	Category C(S)	41819	Upload Photo
17, 19 And 19A Dundas Street				58°57′38″N 3°18′00″W	Category C(S)	41826	Upload Photo
Sule Skerry Lighthouse				59°05′04″N 4°24′24″W	Category A	18598	Upload Photo
1 Dundas Street				58°57′40″N 3°18′00″W	Category C(S)	45355	Upload Photo
13 And 15 Dundas Street				58°57′39″N 3°18′00″W	Category C(S)	45357	Upload Photo
2 And 4 Dundas Street, Including Outbuilding, Slipway And Quay				58°57′39″N 3°17′59″W	Category C(S)	45358	Upload Photo
49 Graham Place				58°57′40″N 3°18′00″W	Category C(S)	45391	Upload Photo
43 Graham Place, 'Ardenlea', Including Boundary Walls				58°57′40″N 3°18′01″W	Category C(S)	45397	Upload Photo
59, 61 And 63 John Street, Including Outbuildings				58°57′53″N 3°17′49″W	Category C(S)	45403	Upload Photo
Ness Road, Fishing Store				58°57′18″N 3°18′02″W	Category C(S)	45409	Upload Photo
34 North End Road				58°58′05″N 3°17′40″W	Category C(S)	45413	Upload Photo
19-23 (Odd Nos) South End				58°57′25″N 3°18′04″W	Category C(S)	45418	Upload Photo
Victoria Street, Alexander Graham Fountain				58°57′48″N 3°17′52″W	Category C(S)	45423	Upload another image See more images
Victoria Street, Stromness Parish Church, Church Of Scotland, Including Church Hall, Gatepiers, Front Garden Wall And Railings				58°57′42″N 3°18′01″W	Category B	45424	Upload Photo
16 Victoria Street, The Harbour Office				58°57′48″N 3°17′51″W	Category C(S)	45439	Upload Photo
9 Alfred Street				58°57′33″N 3°18′04″W	Category C(S)	45329	Upload Photo
61 Alfred Street				58°57′29″N 3°18′05″W	Category C(S)	45333	Upload Photo
16 Alfred Street				58°57′31″N 3°18′02″W	Category C(S)	45339	Upload Photo
17 Church Road				58°57′45″N 3°17′59″W	Category C(S)	45351	Upload Photo
5 Khyber Pass				58°57′39″N 3°18′03″W	Category C(S)	41799	Upload Photo
6 Khyber Pass, Including Outbuilding And Shared Walled Garden				58°57′40″N 3°18′02″W	Category C(S)	41800	Upload Photo
Back Road, Quildon Cottage Including Former Kiln				58°57′38″N 3°18′15″W	Category C(S)	41804	Upload Photo
79 Victoria Street				58°57′44″N 3°17′58″W	Category C(S)	41811	Upload Photo
1-5, (Odd Nos), Graham Place				58°57′41″N 3°17′59″W	Category B	41822	Upload another image
Garson Farm, Including Farm Outbuildings And Horse Mill				58°57′54″N 3°16′56″W	Category B	45380	Upload Photo
41 Graham Place				58°57′40″N 3°18′02″W	Category B	45396	Upload Photo
5 Manse Lane, The Manse, Including Boundary Walls, Gateway And Outbuilding				58°57′43″N 3°18′03″W	Category C(S)	45406	Upload Photo
7 South End				58°57′27″N 3°18′05″W	Category C(S)	45417	Upload Photo
1 And 3 Victoria Street, The Royal Bank Of Scotland, Including Boundary Walls				58°57′50″N 3°17′52″W	Category C(S)	45428	Upload Photo
68 And 70 Victoria Street, Including Quay				58°57′45″N 3°17′53″W	Category C(S)	45442	Upload Photo
108A Victoria Street, Including Quay And Slipway				58°57′43″N 3°17′56″W	Category C(S)	45445	Upload Photo
20 Alfred Street				58°57′31″N 3°18′02″W	Category C(S)	45340	Upload Photo
Back Road, Quildon House Including Outbuildings And Boundary Walls				58°57′37″N 3°18′16″W	Category C(S)	45348	Upload Photo
53 And 55 Alfred Street, Including Garden Wall And Gates				58°57′30″N 3°18′04″W	Category B	41805	Upload Photo
25 Graham Place				58°57′40″N 3°18′00″W	Category C(S)	41824	Upload Photo
23 And 25 Dundas Street				58°57′38″N 3°18′00″W	Category B	41828	Upload Photo
Garson House				58°57′53″N 3°17′02″W	Category B	41834	Upload Photo
Outertown Road, Lingmira Farm, Mill				58°58′39″N 3°21′01″W	Category C(S)	46158	Upload Photo
Citadel Farmhouse, Including Outbuildings				58°57′19″N 3°18′23″W	Category B	45354	Upload Photo
36 And 38 Dundas				58°57′38″N 3°18′00″W	Category C(S)	45360	Upload Photo
7 Graham Place				58°57′41″N 3°18′00″W	Category C(S)	45384	Upload Photo
2 Hellihole Road, Stromness Public Library				58°57′34″N 3°18′04″W	Category C(S)	45399	Upload Photo
15 Ness Road, Former Sule Skerry Lighthouse Station, Including Boundary Walls And Gatepiers				58°57′20″N 3°18′04″W	Category C(S)	45408	Upload Photo
10 And 12 South End, Including Slipway And Quay				58°57′26″N 3°18′03″W	Category C(S)	45421	Upload another image
11 Victoria Street, The Town House, Including Boundary Walls, Gatepiers And Railings				58°57′49″N 3°17′53″W	Category C(S)	45427	Upload Photo
30 Victoria Street, Entrance To The Pier Arts Centre				58°57′47″N 3°17′53″W	Category C(S)	45441	Upload Photo
122 Victoria Street, 'seahaven', Including Common Quay				58°57′41″N 3°17′56″W	Category C(S)	45449	Upload Photo
50-56 (Even Nos) Alfred Street, The Stromness Museum				58°57′28″N 3°18′04″W	Category B	45345	Upload another image
102 Victoria Street, Including Boundary Walls, Gatepiers And Railings				58°57′43″N 3°17′57″W	Category B	41797	Upload another image
3 And 5 South End, Including Boundary Wall				58°57′27″N 3°18′06″W	Category B	41807	Upload Photo
97 Victoria Street, The Bank Of Scotland				58°57′43″N 3°17′59″W	Category B	41817	Upload Photo
8 And 10 Graham Place, 'Lyness House', Including Boundary Walls				58°57′40″N 3°17′59″W	Category C(S)	41825	Upload another image
4 Melvin Place				58°57′35″N 3°18′05″W	Category B	41833	Upload Photo
Kirkwall Road, Millhouse, Including Ancillary Structures And Boundary Walls				58°58′38″N 3°17′19″W	Category C(S)	46156	Upload Photo
5 Dundas Street				58°57′39″N 3°18′00″W	Category C(S)	45356	Upload Photo
25 South End				58°57′25″N 3°18′04″W	Category C(S)	45419	Upload Photo
8 Alfred Street, Including Gatepier				58°57′32″N 3°18′01″W	Category C(S)	45336	Upload another image
10 Alfred Street				58°57′32″N 3°18′01″W	Category C(S)	45337	Upload Photo
45 And 47 John Street				58°57′52″N 3°17′50″W	Category C(S)	41793	Upload Photo
55 John Street				58°57′53″N 3°17′50″W	Category C(S)	41794	Upload Photo
112 Victoria Street, Including Gig House And Quay				58°57′42″N 3°17′57″W	Category B	41810	Upload another image
27 Dundas Street Including Walled Garden And Outbuilding				58°57′38″N 3°18′01″W	Category B	41829	Upload Photo
Outertown Road, Ogalby, Including Gatepiers And Boundary Walls				58°57′44″N 3°18′34″W	Category C(S)	46159	Upload Photo

== Key ==
The scheme for classifying buildings in Scotland is:

- Category A: "buildings of national or international importance, either architectural or historic; or fine, little-altered examples of some particular period, style or building type."
- Category B: "buildings of regional or more than local importance; or major examples of some particular period, style or building type, which may have been altered."
- Category C: "buildings of local importance; lesser examples of any period, style, or building type, as originally constructed or moderately altered; and simple traditional buildings which group well with other listed buildings."

In March 2016 there were 47,288 listed buildings in Scotland. Of these, 8% were Category A, and 50% were Category B, with the remaining 42% being Category C.

== See also ==
- List of listed buildings in Orkney
