= Stromness Museum =

Museum in Orkney Islands, Scotland

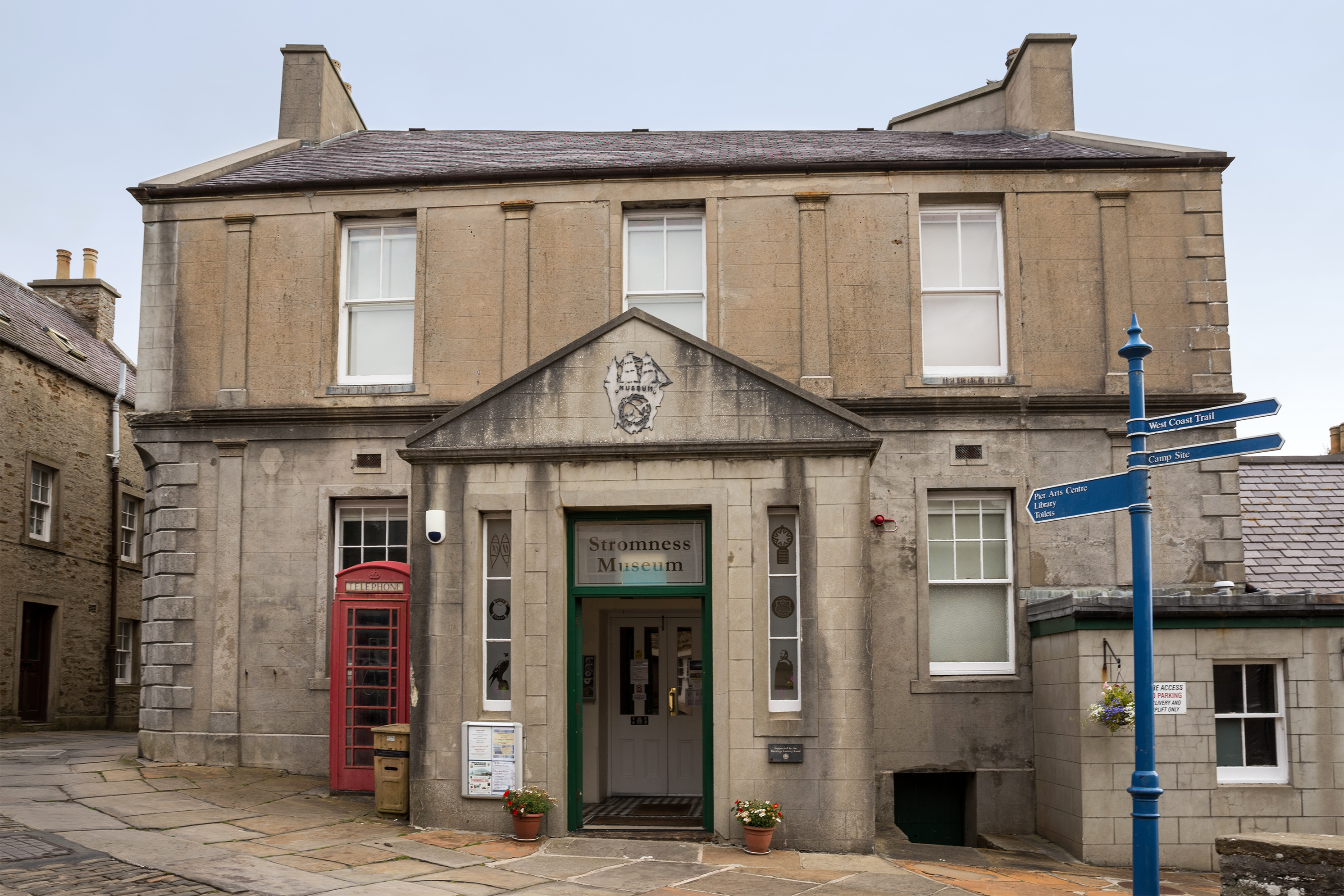
- The museum's building on Alfred Street, Stromness

- Location within Orkney Islands
- Established: 1837
- Location: Stromness, Mainland, Orkney, Scotland
- Coordinates: 58.9577°N 3.30116°W
- Owner: Orkney Natural History Society
- Website: stromnessmuseum.org.uk

Stromness Museum is a small independent museum in the town of Stromness in Orkney, Scotland focusing on the town's connections to maritime and natural history. The building which accommodates the museum was originally constructed as the town hall of Stromness and is a Category B listed building.

== History ==
Following significant population growth, largely associated with the fishing industry, the area became a police burgh in 1856. In this context, the burgh council decided to commission a town hall: the new building was designed in the neoclassical style, built in ashlar stone and was completed in 1858.

The burgh council occupied the ground floor of the building while the Orkney Natural History Society, which had been founded in 1837, established a museum on the first floor of the building in 1858. In the 1920s, the burgh council relocated and the society acquired ownership of the building. The expanded museum was re-opened on the site by Lord Lieutenant of Orkney and Shetland, Alfred Baikie, in February 1931.

The museum is now owned by Orkney Natural History Society Museum, a Scottish Charitable Incorporated Organisation, with members of the society electing a committee of volunteers to manage the museum.

== Collections ==
The museum's Orkney naval history collections include artefacts recovered from the scuttling of the German fleet at Scapa Flow and sunken Royal Navy ships, including a dumaresq from the Dreadnought battleship, HMS Vanguard.

A number of items on display relate to arctic exploration, the 19th-century Orcadian explorer John Rae, and indigenous peoples in Northern Canada. Artefacts include one of the only two Halkett boats known to still exist, and an Arctic medal awarded to the Arctic explorer, John Franklin.

Other exhibits include ethnographic items collected by Orcadians, William Balfour Baikie and Jack Renton, and items from James Cook's third voyage which landed in Stromness on its return home.

The museum's natural history collection includes displays of taxidermied birds, fossils, and molluscs, including items collected by Charles Clouston and Robert Rendall, and the Homosteus milleri fossil discovered by Hugh Miller.

In 2016, the museum discovered a 5,000-year-old neolithic whalebone figurine in its Skara Brae collection that had long been considered lost. In 2020, two Egyptian faience shabti from 1145 to 986 BC were identified in the museum's collection by researchers at the National Museum of Scotland.

== See also ==
- List of listed buildings in Stromness, Orkney
