= Stromness Academy =

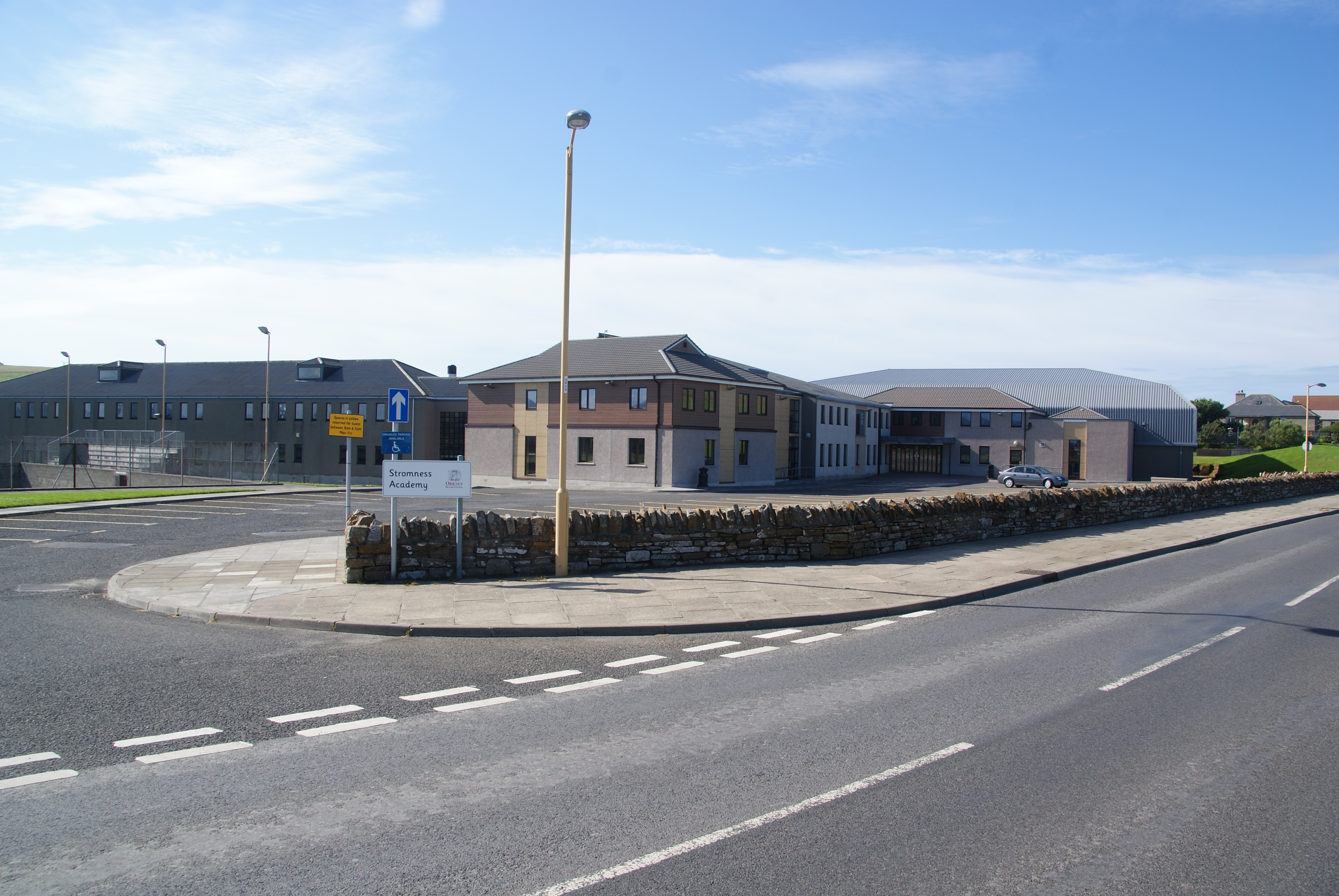
- Stromness Academy in 2013

Location
- Cairston Road; Stromness, Orkney, KW16 3JS; Scotland; 58°58′10″N 3°17′08″W

Information
- Former name: Stromness Higher Grade school
- Motto: Navigate to Success
- Established: 1875
- Local authority: Orkney Islands Council
- Head teacher: Paul Barber
- Staff: 61
- Age: 11 to 18
- Enrolment: 410
- Website: www.stromnessacademy.org.uk

Stromness Academy is a secondary school located in the town of Stromness in the Orkney Islands, established in 1875.

== History ==
Stromness Academy was originally opened in 1875 in the town centre of Stromness. In the 1980s, Stromness Academy was rebuilt in its current location, just outside the Garson Industrial Estate on the east side of Stromness, with the new building officially opening on 11 September 1990. A large extension was added in 2009, which included a music department, and PE and guidance facilities.

== Intake ==
Stromness Academy accepts pupils from Stromness Primary School, Evie Primary School, Firth Primary School, Stenness Community School, and Dounby Primary School. Pupils from North Walls Community School can choose to go to Stromness Academy or Kirkwall Grammar School.

Pupils from the surrounding primary schools attend Stromness Academy for transition days in Primary 7 before they go up to the high school full time.

== Houses ==
The houses in Stromness Academy are:

- Magnus (Green)
- Rognvald (Red)
- Thorfinn (Blue)

There used to be a fourth house (Sigurd), however it was disbanded in 2014 after a falling school role in the early 2010s.

== Notable former pupils ==
- George Mackay Brown, (1921–1996), poet and author
