= Broch of Ayre =

- Location in Orkney, Scotland
- 58.896336°N 2.921019°W
- Type: Broch
- Periods: Iron Age, Roman
- Location: Orkney

Scheduled monument
- Official name: Loch of Ayre, broch at N end of, St Mary's
- Designated: 22 March 1938
- Reference no.: SM1462

Broch of Ayre, also known as St. Mary's Broch, is an Iron Age broch in Orkney, Scotland.

== Location ==
Broch of Ayre is found on the northern shore of Loch Ayre, in the parish of Holm on Orkney Mainland.

== History ==
Broch of Ayre was first excavated in December 1901 and then again in the summer of 1909. Little now survives, though part of the broch wall is still extant. The excavations revealed traces of internal architecture and external, probably later, structures.

== Description ==
The 1901 excavations revealed that the broch wall survived to over a metre in height in parts, with an entrance passage facing to the south-east. The passage contained a broken lintel and architectural features including a guard cell. The interior of the broch contained radial partitions using vertical slabs of stone, and a lintelled well. The broch itself was almost eighteen metres in external diameter, with walls almost five metres thick in places. The 1909 excavation revealed external buildings, likely built later, and the interior of the broch may also have been re-used and partially remodelled in a subsequent phase.

== Archaeological Finds ==
A number of iron objects were discovered, including two spearheads and an axehead. Locational information from the excavation is poor, although one of the spearheads was found associated with the guard cell. Nail heads, bronze pins and a bronze ring were also found. Evidence of metal-working, including a mass of conglomerate with fused pottery and iron, was also found. Bone pins, combs, antler fragments and cetacean bone vessels were found along with several dice. A large quantity of pottery was also found, along with the remains of whale, seal, ox, pig, red deer, sheep, horse, gannet and other birds, and human bone.
