= Leonard Chapman =

Leonard Chapman may refer to:

- Leonard F. Chapman Jr. (1913–2000), Commandant of the Marine Corps
- Leonard George Chapman (1910–1975), inventor, radio engineer and Royal Air Force officer
