= F. Marian McNeill =

British folklorist

F. Marian McNeill MBE
- Born: 26 March 1885; Holm, Orkney
- Died: 22 February 1973 (aged 87); Edinburgh, Scotland
- Education: University of Glasgow
- Occupations: author, suffragist
- Writing career
- Subjects: folklore, cookery
- Notable works: The Silver Bough; The Scots Kitchen
- Literary movement: Scottish Renaissance

Florence Marian McNeill, MBE (26 March 1885 – 22 February 1973) was a Scottish folklorist, author, editor, suffragist and political activist. She is best known for writing The Silver Bough (not to be confused with The Golden Bough), a four-volume study of Scottish folklore; also The Scots Kitchen and Scots Cellar: Its Traditions and Lore with Old-time Recipes.

== Biography ==
McNeill was born in Holm, Orkney on 26 March 1885 to Jessie Janet Dewar and the Reverend Daniel McNeill, a minister of the Free Kirk in Orkney. Dewar was originally from Fochabers, and Rev. McNeill was from Argyll, and was minister of Holm for nearly fifty years. Marian was the eighth of twelve children, and was nicknamed "Floss" by her family and friends. Her sister Mary Lauchline McNeill became a doctor and a suffragist and served in the Scottish Women's Hospitals for Foreign Service during the First World War.

She was educated at Kirkwall Burgh School, where she was friends with poet Edwin Muir.

In 1912 she graduated from the University of Glasgow with an MA. For the next year, she taught English in France and Germany.

She returned to the UK in 1913 and worked initially as an organiser for the Scottish Federation of Women's Suffrage Societies, and later as secretary for the Association for Moral and Social Hygiene in London where she remained until 1917. At the end of the First World War, she lived in Greece for a while. After that, she moved back to Edinburgh and started work as a researcher for the Scottish National Dictionary, and by 1929 she had become principal assistant on the project.

In the years between the First and Second World Wars she became involved in the revival of Scottish literature and culture known as the Scottish Renaissance. She is well known as the author of The Scots Kitchen, published in 1929. This encyclopaedic work covers the essentials and diversity of Scotland's culinary heritage, including many historical and literary references. Recipes include Forfar bridies, cock-a-leekie soup and porridge.

She joined the Scottish National Party, along with her brother Duncan McNeill, and later became its vice president.

A smaller work, equally well researched, is her Iona: A History of the Island. Noting the "much detail" which characterised works on the subject already in existence in 1920, a "modest handbook" was nowhere to be found; a deficiency she set about rectifying.

In 1932, she wrote her only novel, The Road Home.

From 1957 onwards she published a four-volume study of Scottish National Festivals, The Silver Bough, echoing Frazer's title The Golden Bough. This treasury of Scottish folklore and folk belief covers both the principal national festivals as well as many local ones and was the result of a lifetime of research. In 2008 British Youth Music Theatre adapted the work for a stage production at the Aberdeen International Youth Festival. Scottish composer Gerard McBurney collaborated with Scottish poet Iain Finlay Macleod, director Kath Burlinson and choreographer Struan Leslie on the adaptation.

In the 1962 New Year Honours McNeill, "Writer on Scottish cooking", was appointed MBE. She died in Edinburgh on 22 February 1973.

== Bibliography ==
- Iona: A History of the Island. Hardback Blackie & Son. 1st edition 1920, 2nd edition 1935, 3rd edition 1946, Later updates ISBN 9780216893245
- With F J Wakefield An Inquiry in Ten Towns in England and Wales into the Protection of Minor Girls (1916)
- The Road Home (1932)
- An Iona Anthology (1990)

=== Folklore ===
- Relic of Witch Cult (1944)
- Hallowe'en: its origin, rites and ceremonies in the Scottish tradition (1970)
- McNeill, F. Marian (1957–1968). The Silver Bough: a Four Volume Study of the National and Local Festivals of Scotland, Vol. 1–4. William MacLellan, Glasgow. Paperback edition, ISBN 0-86241-231-5
  - Volume I: Scottish Folk-Lore and Folk-Belief
  - Volume II: A Calendar of Scottish National Festivals, Candlemas to Harvest Home
  - Volume III: A Calendar of Scottish National Festivals, Halloween to Yule
  - Volume IV: The Local Festivals of Scotland

=== Cookery books ===
- The Scots Kitchen: Its Traditions and Lore, with Old-time Recipes. Blackie & Son. 1929. ISBN 1-84183-070-4 (2004)
- The Book of Breakfasts (1932)
- Good Fare Christmas: Some Seasonal Recipes from the Independent Grocers of Scotland (1945)
- Recommended Recipes (1948)
- The Scots Cellar, Its Traditions and Lore (1956)
- Recipes from Scotland (1946)
- The Camper's Kitchen (1933)
- Highland Cookery (1971)
- (with Susan Scott) Oat Cuisine: A Celebration of Caledonian Cookery (1985)
