= Seelyhoo =

Scottish folk band

- Origin: Edinburgh, Scotland
- Genres: Traditional Scottish folk
- Years active: 1995–1998
- Label: Greentrax
- Past members: Sandy Brechin (accordion); Jennifer Wrigley (fiddle); Hazel Wrigley (piano, guitar); Niall Muir (bass guitar); Jim Walker (drums); Fiona Mackenzie (vocals); Aaron Jones (bass guitar)

Seelyhoo were a Scottish folk band based in Edinburgh, with band members originally from Orkney and the Isle of Lewis.

Seelyhoo were fronted by songwriter, vocalist and tin whistle player Fiona Mackenzie. Their music has been described as belonging to the traditional side of the progressive Celtic music movement, and Mackenzie's voice has been compared to that of Capercaillie's Karen Matheson. The band toured in Great Britain and continental Europe.

Seelyhoo's played traditional folk songs, as well as new songs written by Mackenzie, Jennifer Wrigley, Hazel Wrigley, and Sandy Brechin.

== Discography ==
- The First Caul (1995) Greentrax Recordings CDTRAX 102
- Leetera (1998) Greentrax Recordings CDTRAX 160

== Lineup ==
- Fiona Mackenzie (vocals, tin whistle)
- Sandy Brechin (accordion)
- Jennifer Wrigley (fiddle, hardanger fiddle)
- Jim Walker (percussion)
- Niall Muir (bass guitar, backing vocals)
- Hazel Wrigley (guitar, piano, fender rhodes, mandolin)
- Aaron Jones (bass guitar)

== Reviews ==
- Musical Discoveries review
