= John Thomson Mason (disambiguation) =

John Thomson Mason may refer to:

- John Thomson Mason (1765–1824), American jurist and Attorney General of Maryland in 1806
- John Thomson Mason (1787–1850), American lawyer, United States marshal, Secretary of Michigan Territory from 1830 through 1831
- John Thomson Mason Jr. (1815–1873), U.S. Representative from Maryland, son of John Thomson Mason (1765–1824)

== See also ==
- John Mason (disambiguation)
