= Stromness Primary School =

Location
- Cairston Road; Stromness, Orkney, KW16 3JS; Scotland; 58°58′6.91″N 3°17′32.3″W

Information
- Type: Primary School
- Established: 1969
- Local authority: Orkney Islands Council
- Department for Education URN: 6002528 Tables
- Age: 5 to 12
- Enrolment: around 125
- Website: www.stromnessps.uk

Stromness Primary School is a primary school in Stromness, Orkney. The school has around 125 students.

== History ==
The school opened in August 1969 with 220 students, in a new building on Franklin Road.

Composer Peter Maxwell Davies wrote a 40-minute childrens' opera, The Rainbow, to be performed by the students of Stromness Primary School at the 1981 St Magnus Festival. The story was set in Stromness and drew on Orcadian traditional music.

In 1996, a pupil had to commute to Stromness School by ferry after the school on Graemsay, of which he was the only pupil, closed. The cost of keeping the school open had been £54,000 per year.

In 2010, Big Brother winner Cameron Stout eschewed a media career to become a teacher at the school.

On 15 January 2013, the school relocated to a new building on Cairston Road. The new school was officially opened by Anne, Princess Royal on 4 July 2013. A copper sculpture by Anne Bevan and funded by the Orkney Islands Council was installed on the school grounds. The newly developed school won the 2014 Society for Construction and Architecture in Local Authorities "Civil Building of the Year" Award.

On 24 September 2015, Orkney Islands Council reported that the roof of the new school building required re-slating after approximately 300 roof slates were blown off. The council said that the building had met UK building standards, and the tiles would be replaced with Welsh slate.

BBC Scotland News reported in 2024 that the incoming P1 class at the school included no girls, with teachers noting that this was very unusual.

== Orkney Research and Innovation Campus ==
In 2017, Highlands and Islands Enterprise and Orkney Islands Council entered into a partnership to establish the Orkney Research and Innovation Campus (ORIC), a centre for commercial and academic research in Stromness, with initial funding of £6.5 million including £1.48 million from the European Regional Development Fund. Ownership of the former Stromness Primary School building on Franklin Road was transferred from the council to the ORIC partnership, along with the nearby Old Academy building. It was expected that around 65 jobs would be created on the campus.

Construction began in 2018, and the two buildings were extensively refurbished, with the former school building being renamed after Orcadian poet and naturalist Robert Rendall. The first phase of construction was completed in 2019. By 2022, around 160 people were working at the campus, and the two partners committed an additional £2.8 million to further upgrade the buildings. A substantial extension to the campus was refused planning permission in 2025.
