= Orkney Natural History Society =

Scottish scientific society

The Orkney Natural History Society was a scientific society established in 1837 on Orkney, Scotland by Rev. William Stobbs, and Rev. William Clouston, L.L.D.

It was one of many provincial naturalist societies to emerge in Victorian Britain. Their role in contributing knowledge, collecting specimens, and fostering cultures of scientific inquiry outside the metropolitan centers is now widely recognized by historians of science.

== Founding ==
The Orkney Natural History Society was established on 28 December 1837 at Stromness, Orkney. Its first Annual Report stated that the society aimed at 'investigating the Natural History and Antiquities' of Orkney county, 'promoting of natural science by the support of a museum', and 'stimulating the inhabitants of these islands to study of the Almighty's works'. It organised public lectures and excursions and founded the Stromness Museum, which is still in existence today.

By 1838, the society's collection of specimens included 100 fossil fish, 400 minerals, 60 specimens of birds, 200 eggs, and 600 land plants.

== People ==
The first President was the Reverend Charles Clouston, a Prebystarian Minister from Stromness. The second president was the Rev. William Clouston, who published widely on Orkney flora and fauna. Members in this early period included marine botanist Dr Pollexfen, Dr Wallace, Dr P. Neill, and Dr Traill. Prominent botanist and astronomer Edward Joseph Lowe was an honorary member. The Society's First Annual Report listed 118 ordinary members.

== The Stromness Museum ==
The Orkney Natural History Society founded the Stromness Museum. The museum was intended to promote the study of the natural sciences. Specimens were sourced from Upper Canada, Norway, France, Italy, Britain and Orkney itself. It held notable collections in Orkney algae and birds.

In 1858, the museum moved into 52 Alfred Street, Stromness, above the Town Hall. In the 1920s, the Society bought up the Old Town Hall building where it remains today. The museum was re-opened on the site in February 1931 by Lord Lieutenant of Orkney.

Today, the museum features collections in natural history, maritime history, ethnography, archaeology and social history.
