= Scottish Federation of Women's Suffrage Societies =

Scottish organisation

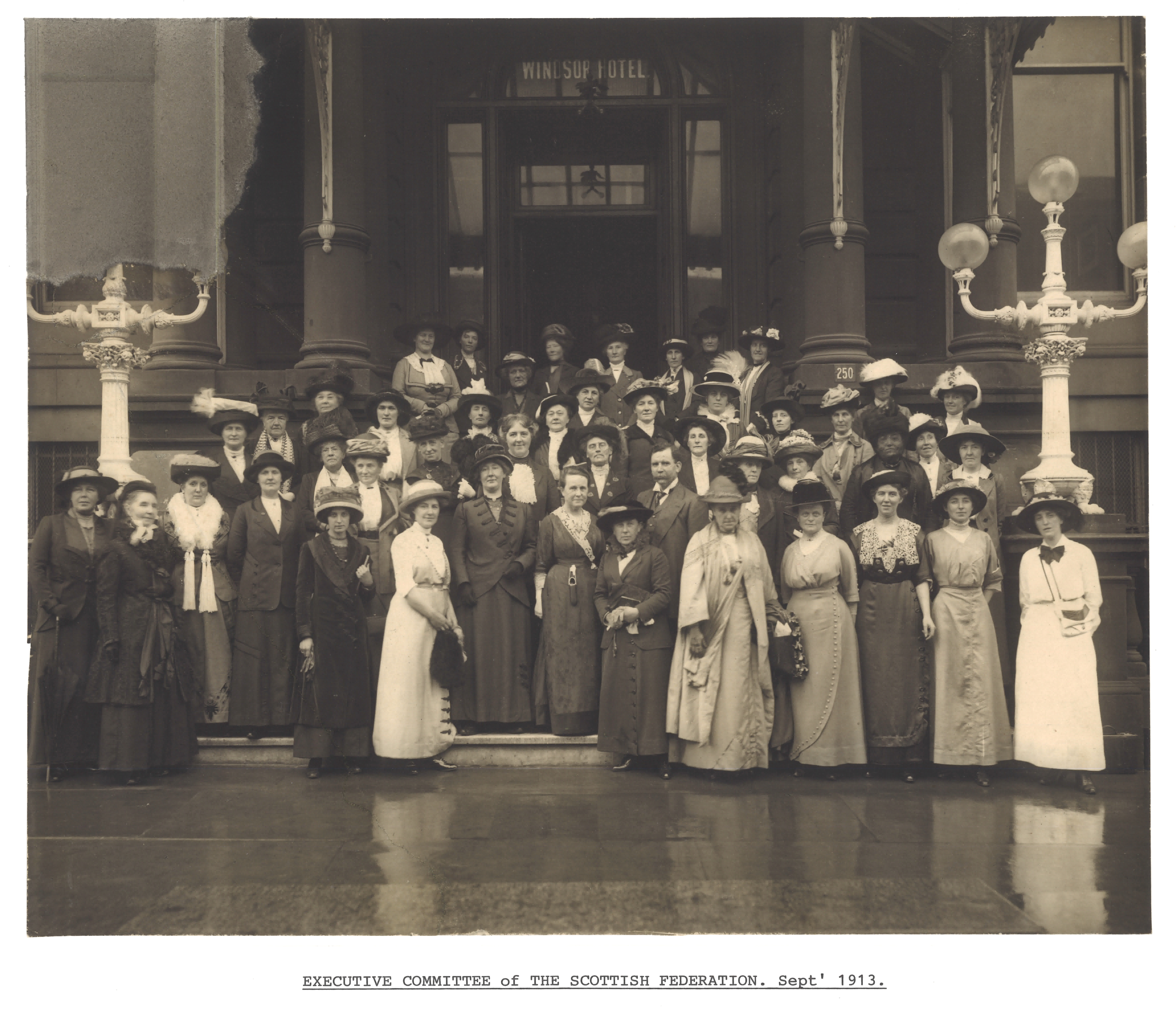
- Executive Committee of the Scottish Federation of the National Union of Women's Suffrage Societies in 1913 at the Windsor Hotel
- Formation: 1910
- Location: Scotland
- Key people: Elsie Inglis; Chrystal Jessie Macmillan; Wilhelmina Hay Abbott; Louisa Innes Lumsden; Florence Marian McNeill
- Affiliations: National Union of Women's Suffrage Societies, London

Scottish Federation of Women's Suffrage Societies is a Scottish organisation for women's suffrage. It was established in 1910 as an affiliate of the National Union of Women's Suffrage Societies in London for the constitutional suffrage campaign in Scotland. Those activists largely following peaceful methods were nicknamed as Suffragists.

The Federation supported the establishment of the Scottish Women's Hospitals proposed by Elsie Maude Inglis.

== Notable Members ==
- Wilhelmina Hay (Elizabeth) Abbott (1884–1957)
- Louisa Innes Lumsden (1840–1935)
- Chrystal Jessie Macmillan (1872–1937)
- Florence Marian McNeill (1885–1973)
- Eliza Maud "Elsie" Inglis (1864–1917)

== See also ==
- Women's suffrage in the United Kingdom
- Women's suffrage in Scotland
- Edinburgh National Society for Women's Suffrage
- Glasgow and West of Scotland Association for Women's Suffrage
