= Kirkwall Grammar School =

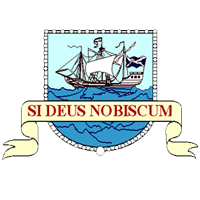
- Badge of Kirkwall Grammar School

Location
- The Meadows; Kirkwall, Orkney, KW15 1QN; Scotland
- Coordinates: 58°58′43″N 2°56′49″W

Information
- Motto: Si Deus Nobiscum
- Established: 1200
- Founder: Bishop Bjarni
- Local authority: Orkney Islands Council
- Head teacher: Ruth McKay
- Staff: 80
- Gender: Mixed
- Age: 11 to 18
- Enrolment: 900-1,000
- Houses: Copinsay; Eynhallow; Fara
- Colours: Navy & white
- Nickname: KGS
- Website: kgsorkney.com

Kirkwall Grammar School is a secondary school in Kirkwall, Orkney, Scotland. It was established in c. 1200. The current school building was opened in 2014. It is the largest school in the Orkney Islands, and one of the oldest schools in the world.

== History ==
=== Earlier schools (1200–1973) ===
Kirkwall Grammar School was established in 1200 when Bishop Bjarni established a cathedral school where his clergy taught singing and Latin.

In 1760, £60 was donated in order to repair and build two schools. These plans resulted in two new schools being built north of St Magnus Cathedral. In 1872 the Education Act led to the amalgamation of the Grammar School, Subscription School and Infant School to form the Burgh School of Kirkwall. Later, in the early part of the 20th century, the name reverted to the Kirkwall Grammar School. The school moved to a new site at Papdale in phases between 1973 and 1975, and in 1978 the 'old' Kirkwall Grammar School was converted to form part of the Orkney Islands Council building.

=== New school at Papdale (1973–2013) ===
The new Kirkwall Grammar School building was located at Papdale in east Kirkwall, and opened in several phases, with the first phase being complete by the summer holidays of 1973, as pupils were accommodated into the new building in groups over time, with eventually all being housed in the building by 1975. This school building housed the city’s swimming pool, which had opened in 1972, before the first phase of the school building. The building was demolished in stages starting with the P.E. department in Autumn 2011, which meant pupils would have to be bussed across town to the Pickaquoy Centre in order to carry out P.E. classes, due to the construction of the new school next door being partially built over the former building's P.E. department. The swimming pool shut on 11 June 2013, and in December 2013 the rest of the building shut its doors to pupils. What was left of the former Kirkwall Grammar School building was demolished in the early months of 2014, and the site it sat on became the playing fields for the new building.

=== Current school building (2013–present) ===
The current Kirkwall Grammar School broke ground in 2011. Its theatre building opened in December 2013, at the same time the school was opened for the public to take tours. Pupils also took tours of their new school not long before they were transferred to the new building. The facility opened for pupils at the start of the new term in January 2014, but was officially opened in June 2014 by then-First Minister, Alex Salmond.

== Intake ==
Kirkwall Grammar School accepts pupils from Papdale Primary School, Glaitness Primary School, St Andrews Primary School, Burray Primary School, Hope Community School, Orphir Community School, Shapinsay Community School, Rousay Community School, Flotta Community School, Eday Community School, North Ronaldsay Primary School and Egilsay Community School. The school also takes in some pupils from North Walls Community School. Some pupils pick Stromness Academy. Pupils from Sanday, Westray and Stronsay Junior High Schools go to Kirkwall Grammar School when they reach S5 or S6.

Pupils from the primary schools in the KGS catchment area attend the school for two transition days in June before the summer holidays where they are assigned their classes and timetable and given a taster of the school. After the summer holidays they attend the school full time.

== Houses ==
The houses in Kirkwall Grammar School are:

- Copinsay (Yellow)
- Eynhallow (Red)
- Fara (Blue)

The houses are named after uninhabited Orkney islands, and were chosen via a school vote in April 2016. They came into effect after the summer holidays of 2016, replacing the six original houses. The old KGS houses were named after Orkney beaches; Berstane, Dingieshowe, Inganess, Newark, Scapa and Waulkmill.

== Notable former pupils ==
- James Aitken, (1613–1687), Church of Scotland bishop
- Malcolm Laing, (1762–1818), historian, advocate and politician
- Sir James David Marwick, (1826–1908), lawyer, historian and town clerk
- William Peddie, (1861–1946), physicist and applied mathematician
- Sir John Flett, (1869–1947), geologist, Director of the Geological Survey of Great Britain (1920–35)
- Robert Charles Wallace CMG, (1881–1955), geologist, President of the University of Alberta (1928–1936)
- James Andrew Gunn, (1882–1958), pharmacologist
- F. Marian McNeill MBE, (1885–1973), folklorist, author, editor, suffragist and political activist
- Stanley Cursiter OBE, CBE, (1887–1976), artist
- Robert Rendall, (1898–1967), poet
- Alexander Burt Taylor CBE, (1904–1972), civil servant
- John M. Mason MBE, (1940–2011), founder, musical director, and conductor of the Scottish Fiddle Orchestra
- Angus Konstam, (b. 1960), historian and author
- Dave Gray, (1961–2024), BBC broadcaster and journalist
- Peter Marshall, (b. 1964), historian of the Reformation
- Liam McArthur, (b. 1967), Member of the Scottish Parliament for Orkney
- Jennifer Wrigley, (b. 1974), folk violinist
- Hazel Wrigley, (b. 1974), folk guitarist and pianist
- Amy Liptrot, (b. 1981), journalist and author
- Neil Gray, (b. 1986), Member of the Scottish Parliament for Airdrie and Shotts
- Eilidh Fisher, (b. 1999), film and television actress

== See also ==
- List of the oldest schools in the United Kingdom
- Education in Scotland
