= Breckness House =

17th-century ruin in Scotland

Coordinates: 58°57′51″N 3°20′59″W

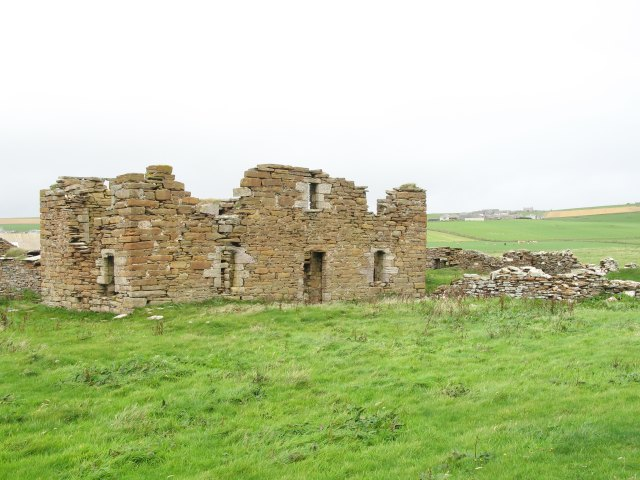
Ruins of Breckness House

Breckness House, sometimes known as Breckness Castle, is the site of the 17th-century mansion, chapel and burial ground, built by George Graham (1565–1643), the Bishop of Orkney. It is located near Stromness, Orkney in Scotland. Historic Environment Scotland established the site as a scheduled monument in 1957.

== Description ==
Breckness House is the ruined two-storey mansion built by the Bishop of Orkney, George Graham in 1633. It can be found on the southwest coast of Mainland, Orkney, about 3 km west of the town of Stromness. The house is a large L-shaped building and was built with rubble and clay. The remaining walls stand two storeys high. The house's central block measures 6.89 m (22.6 ft) by 12.67 m (41.6 ft). A wing to the central structure extends 8.10 m (26.6 ft) north at the east end of the central building and is 7.28 m (23.9 ft) wide. There is an enclosure visible on the south of the house that was most likely a garden.

The entrance to the house originally displayed a panel with the arms and crest of Bishop Graham and the date of 1633. The panel was later removed because of the house's deteriorating condition and is now in Skaill House. Inside the house was a newel staircase that led to the first floor and doorways to the kitchen wing and the ground floor rooms. The first ground floor room has a fireplace and the second, larger room accessed the kitchen. The upper floor of the wing consists of a single room, used as a garderobe. The first floor of the central block contained two rooms. There was probably an attic in the roof.

== History ==
Graham was the last Bishop to build a house on Orkney. He held the bishopric for over thirty years, from 1616 to 1638. Along with all the Scottish bishops at the time, Graham was removed from his see on 18 November 1638. He died in 1643.

Historic Environment Scotland established the site as a scheduled monument in 1957. The monument consists of the 17th century estate and the remains of an earlier chapel and burial ground. A portion of this scheduled area covers a prehistoric settlement. The site of the chapel is visible in a small, elevated area south of Breckness House. East-west lying burials have been identified near the chapel. The broch which lies underneath the site has very little remaining of the original structure. In 2001, a stone was discovered near an old field wall, in an area near the house. The damaged stone contained a portion of a runic inscription, which was too short to translate.

== See also ==
- Earl's Palace, Birsay
- Broch of Gurness
- National Covenant
