= Fiona Mackenzie =

Fiona Mackenzie may refer to:

- Fiona J. Mackenzie, Scottish Gaelic singer, from Dingwall, Scotland
- Fiona Mackenzie, singer-songwriter of Gress, Isle of Lewis, Scotland, former member of Seelyhoo and Cruinn
- Fiona McKenzie, tennis player, see 1967 Federation Cup (tennis)
