= HMS Lavinia =

Royal Navy frigate active during Napoleonic Wars

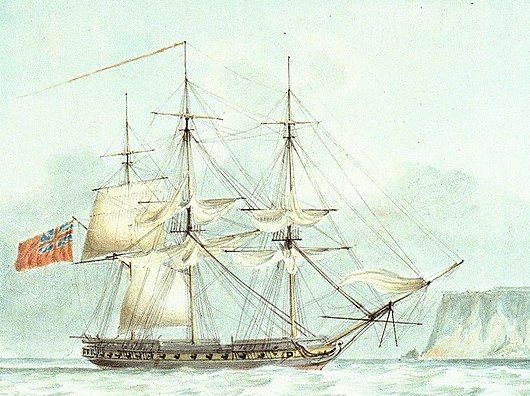
- HMS Lavinia off Berry Head in 1806

History

United Kingdom
- Name: HMS Lavinia
- Ordered: 15 February 1797
- Builder: Jacobs and sons yard at Milford Haven
- Laid down: May 1798
- Launched: 6 March 1806
- Fate: Sunk

General characteristics
- Tons burthen: 1,171 67/94 (bm)
- Length: 158 ft (48 m)
- Beam: 40 ft 8 in (12.40 m)
- Depth of hold: 14 ft (4.3 m)
- Propulsion: Sail
- Complement: 294 later increased to 340
- Armament: UD: 30 × 18-pounder guns; QD: 6 × 9-pounder guns + 8 × 32-pounder carronades; Fc: 2 × 9-pounder guns + 4 × 32-pounder carronades

HMS Lavinia was a 44-gun fifth-rate frigate of the Royal Navy, launched in 1806 at Milford Haven. She was 1,17167/94 tons burthen and carried a main battery of thirty 18-pounder (8.2 kg) guns on the upper deck with a secondary armament of eight 9-pounder (4.1 kg) guns and twelve 32-pounder (15 kg) carronades.

Lavinia served during the Napoleonic Wars, at first in the English Channel and then the Mediterranean, part of a squadron under Vice Admiral Edward Thornbrough, operating in the Tyrrhenian Sea and later blockading the port of Toulon, France. In 1809, she joined the Walcheren Campaign, taking part in a two-day long bombardment of Flushing forcing its capitulation on 15 August and leaving the British in control of Walcheren. The expedition was ultimately a failure and in 1810, Lavinia returned to the Mediterranean.

She was recalled to Plymouth for repair in 1813, then laid up in ordinary. She was serving as a hulk in Plymouth harbour in 1868 where she was later sunk in a collision with a German steamship.

== Design, construction and armament ==
Lavinia was a Royal Navy frigate that was initially proposed as a copy of William Rule's Acasta, but was instead built to a Jean-Louis Barrallier design with an increased hull length. Ordered on 15 February 1797, her keel, of 132 feet 9 1/2 inches (40.5 m) was laid down at Milford Haven in May 1798. When finished, she was 158 feet 1 inch (48.2 m) along the gun deck, had a beam of 40 feet 8 3/4 inches (12.4 m) and a depth in the hold of 14 feet (4.3 m). She was 1,17167/94 tons burthen and drew between 11 ft 6 in (3.51 m) and 13 ft 6 in (4.11 m). She was the only frigate built to her design and was therefore both the first and last of her class.

Lavinia carried a main battery of thirty 18-pounder (8.2 kg) guns on the upper deck with a secondary armament of six 9-pounder (4.1 kg) guns and eight 32-pounder (15 kg) carronades on the quarterdeck and two 9-pounder (4.1 kg) guns and four 32-pounder (15 kg) carronades on the forecastle. When launched on 6 March 1806, she was rated as a 44-gun, fifth-rate frigate.

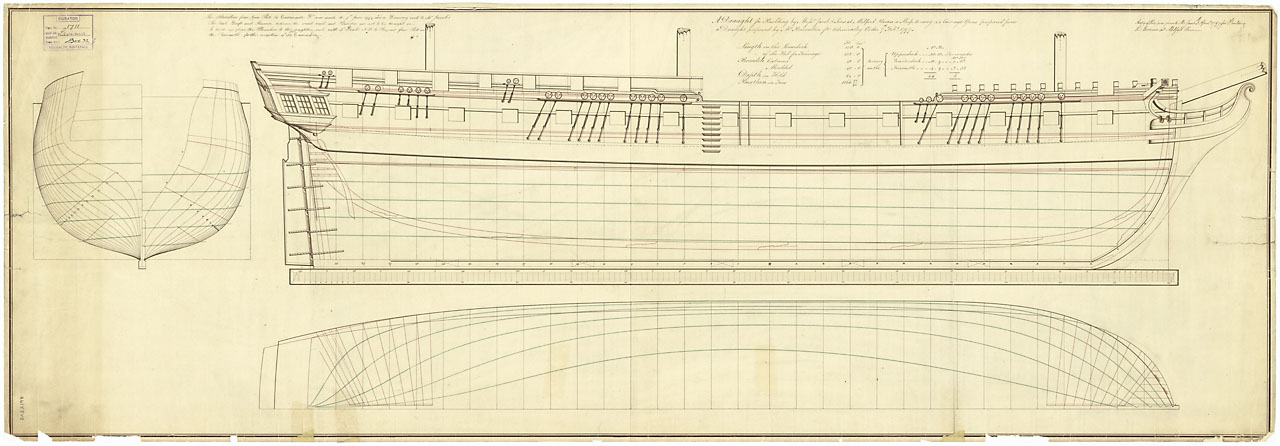
Profile plan of HMS Lavinia

== Service ==
Lavinia was first commissioned in February 1806 under Lord William Stuart and once finished, began her service in the Channel. On 15 August 1807, she arrived in Plymouth from Rochefort with despatches for Admiral Alan Gardner from Rear-Admiral Richard Strachan. She sailed for the Mediterranean on 30 January 1808, where she joined a fleet under Vice Admiral Cuthbert Collingwood.

On 23 February, Lavinia was part of a squadron under Vice Admiral Edward Thornbrough, stationed off Palermo, when word was received that a French Fleet had been seen near Corfu. The ten ships-of-the-line, three frigates, two corvettes, and seven armed transports under Admiral Ganteaume had come from Toulon to relieve the island, which was under a British blockade. Thornbrough immediately dispatched Lavinia and the fifth-rate frigate HMS Spartan to gain intelligence while he and the remaining ships went in search of Collingwood. Lavinia captured three enemy vessels during the following month but was unable to locate her original quarry. Spartan discovered the French on 1 April, between Cape Bon and Sardinia but by the time the two British frigates had rendezvoused with their fleet, Ganteaume was back in Toulon where, on 3 May, Thornbrough began a blockade. In December, Lavinia recaptured a British merchant vessel, Lady Anne, before returning to England.

Lavinia was part of a large expeditionary force in the summer 1809. Comprising more than 600 vessels and nearly 40,000 troops, it left The Downs on 28 July, intent on destroying the dockyards and arsenals at Antwerp, Terneuse and Flushing, and capturing the French fleet stationed in the river Scheldt. On 11 August, Lavinia led a squadron of frigates up the river and forced a passage between the batteries of Flushing and Cadzand. Despite enduring fire for more than two hours, none of Lavinia's crew were either killed or wounded.

The two-day long bombardment of Flushing by Lavinia and her companions, forced its capitulation on 15 August and left the British in control of Walcheren, which they garrisoned with 10,000 troops. Schouwen and Duiveland on the Eastern branch of the Scheldt, were occupied peacefully two days later. The French fleet had already withdrawn to Antwerp however, leaving more than 35,000 French soldiers, garrisoned in heavily armed forts at Lillo, Liefkenshoech, and Antwerp, between them and the British. The deliberate destruction of dykes by the French had led to widespread flooding, and with disease spreading through the British army, it was decided to abandon the expedition in early September.

Lavinia sailed for Portugal in July 1810 and served again in the Mediterranean where on 5 October 1811, she captured a French pink. The United States declared war in June 1812 and on 8 August, Lavinia was part of a small squadron off Gibraltar that captured four American vessels.

== Later service and fate ==
Lavinia was recalled to Plymouth and laid up in ordinary in February 1813. A substantial repair was required in February 1815, which took until September 1816 and cost £44,684, after which Lavinia was laid up once more. She was brought back into service as a Lazaretto and was fitted out for this purpose between April and July 1836 before being taken to Liverpool where she was employed.

Lavinia returned to Plymouth to be refitted as a coal depot between January and April 1852 and was eventually hulked there in 1868. She was saved from being broken up when the order was cancelled in October 1868, but was sunk in a collision with the German steamer Cimbria on 20 February 1870. Lavinia was sold for salvage in March 1870.
