= Jonathan Mason =

Jonathan Mason may refer to:

- Jonathan Mason (politician) (1756–1831), American politician
- Jonathan Mason (actor) (born 1996), English actor
- Jonathan Mason (rugby union) (born 1965), Welsh rugby union player

== See also ==
- John Mason (disambiguation)
