= John Mason (cricketer) =

English cricketer

Personal information
- Full name: John Mason
- Born: 6 March 1984 (age 42)
- Batting: Right-handed
- Bowling: Right-arm slow

Domestic team information
- Years: Team
- 2001–2002: Cumberland

Career statistics
| Competition | List A |
|---|---|
| Matches | 2 |
| Runs scored | 16 |
| Batting average | 16.00 |
| 100s/50s | 0/0 |
| Top score | 14 |
| Balls bowled | 24 |
| Wickets | 1 |
| Bowling average | 39.00 |
| 5 wickets in innings | 0 |
| 10 wickets in match | 0 |
| Best bowling | 1/39 |
| Catches/stumpings | 0/– |
- Source: Cricinfo, 27 March 2011

John Mason (born 6 March 1974) is an English former cricketer. Mason was a right-handed batsman who bowled right-arm slow.

Mason made his debut for Cumberland County Cricket Club in the 2001 Minor Counties Championship against Lincolnshire, scoring 56. He played three further Minor Counties Championship matches for Cumberland in 2002. In his time with Cumberland, Mason played two List A matches against the Warwickshire Cricket Board the 1st round of the 2002 Cheltenham & Gloucester Trophy which was held in 2001, and against the Nottinghamshire Cricket Board in the 1st round of the 2003 Cheltenham & Gloucester Trophy which was held in 2002. In his two List A matches, he scored 16 runs at a batting average of 16.00, with a high score of 14. With the ball, his only List A wicket was Warwickshire Cricket Board captain Naheem Sajjad.
