= Jennifer and Hazel Wrigley =

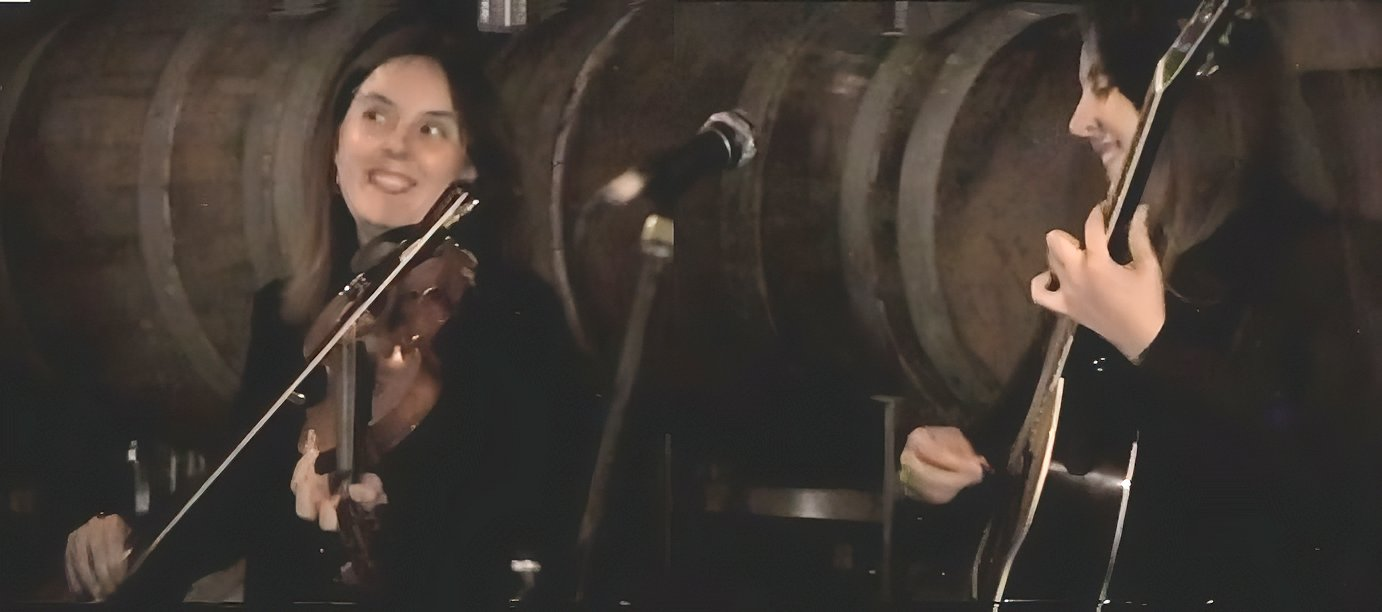
- The Wrigley sisters on stage in Hobart, Tasmania, 2002

Background information
- Born: 16 August 1974 (age 50)
- Origin: Orkney, Scotland
- Genres: Scottish folk music
- Years active: 1980s–present
- Members: Jennifer Wrigley; Hazel Wrigley
- Website: www.wrigleysisters.com

Jennifer and Hazel Wrigley are an international folk music duo playing fiddle (Jennifer) and guitar/piano (Hazel). They are twin sisters, born 16 August 1974, who grew up in Orkney, Scotland. They started to play when given instruments on their 8th birthday and soon joined the Orkney Strathspey and Reel Society in Kirkwall. In their early teens they were playing, often with their older sister Emma on accordion, at local concerts and ceilidhs around Orkney. There they were spotted by Orkney's only recording studio who launched them into Dancing Fingers, their first album, recorded between the ages of 13 and 16 years (i.e. between 1987 and 1990) and released in 1991 when they were 16 years old.

The success of this album moved them into the UK folk circuit, but this proved arduous (Cornwall to Middlesbrough in back-to-back gigs), and eventually they moved to Edinburgh after launching their second album, The Watch Stone, in 1994. In Edinburgh they became part of the city's folk scene and fronted a six-piece band called Seelyhoo, which recorded two albums.

Playing at London's Barbican Centre in 1995, they were spotted by a New Zealand music scout who invited them to play at the Auckland Folk Festival, which prompted the twins to organise a three-month "world tour" in 1997. At about that time Jennifer won the UK's premier accolade for new folk talent (BBC Young Tradition Award) which helped boost the tour and their international reputation. Working without a manager, they organised a second world tour in 1999 and issued a third album Huldreland (in the Folk Roots top ten of 1998). Four transatlantic trips in 1999 cemented their place on the international folk scene. In 2001 they issued an album Skyran.

In 2005 they returned to Orkney and acquired premises in Kirkwall where they launched The Reel, a music/social centre offering an instrument/music shop, lessons to aspiring musicians, and a coffee shop where sessions could often be heard. The Reel was shut down in November 2020 having been closed since March 2020 due to the COVID-19 pandemic.

== Discography ==
=== Jennifer & Hazel Wrigley ===
- Dancing Fingers (1991) – Attic Records ATCD026
- The Watch Stone (1994) – Attic Records ATCD038
- Huldreland (1997) – Greentrax Records CDTRAX148
- Mither o' the Sea (1999) – Greentrax Records CDTRAX182
- Skyran (2001) – GeoSound Records GSCD01
- Idiom (2011) – GeoSound Records GSCD02

=== Collaborations and compilations ===
- The Wrigley Sisters with David Campbell – Orkney After Sunset: Tales and Tunes (2000) – Attic Records ATCD057
- Orkney Folk Festival – The Millennium Concert (2000) – Mariner Music MMCD0001
- The Orkney Sessions from The Reel (2005) – Attic Records ATCD070
- Orkney Folk: traditional music from the islands (2007) – Orkney Folk Festival 25th year – Orkney Folk Festival Records OFFCD025
- Gems from the Attic: Spanning 25 years of recordings from Attic Records (2007) – Attic Records ATCD072

=== Seelyhoo ===
- The First Caul (1995) – Greentrax Records CDTRAX102
- Leetera (1998) – Greentrax Records CDTRAX160
