= Leonard George Chapman =

- Born: 28 March 1910
- Died: 25 July 1975 (aged 65)
- Military career
- Allegiance: United Kingdom
- Branch: Royal Air Force
- Service years: 1937–1964
- Rank: Squadron Leader
- Nickname: Len
- Conflicts: Second World War

Squadron Leader Leonard George Chapman (28 March 1910 – 25 July 1975) was an inventor, radio engineer and Royal Air Force officer.

While serving in the Royal Air Force he invented the 'Chapman Method' in 1937–1938. This method accurately determines the location of an object from the time difference of arrival of a signal (possibly radio echo) emitted from that object to three or more receivers. A method commonly used in civil and military surveillance applications, and also known as Multilateration. Thus it has been suggested that Chapman be nominated as the father of Multilateration.

Chapman was in charge of installing 5 radar stations as part of the Chain Home system. Including the Netherbutton station in the parish of Holm, Orkney Islands, the installation of which Chapman performed while only holding the rank of Corporal.

He had a long and distinguished career holding a variety of commands, rising to the rank of Squadron Leader and receiving a permanent commission.

== Early life ==
Leonard Chapman was born on 28 March 1910 to father George Chapman and mother Ellen Cole. George Chapman was serving at the time in the Queen's Northamptonshire Regiment.

By 1929 the direction of Leonard Chapman's life's work had begun to form when he attended Flowerdown, the Royal Air Force Electrical and Wireless school for training aircraft apprentices.

Subsequently, Chapman attended the Chatham Technical School for 2 years. He was then accepted into the Engineering Department of Woolwich Polytechnic for 3 years, after which he attended the Royal Air Force Electrical and Radio School for 3 years. Finally in 1937 he attended the Ground Radar course under Watson-Watt.

== Royal Air Force Service ==
=== Context of Chapman's work ===
George Chapman

During the late 1920s and the 1930s due to advances in aircraft technology London and other cities were becoming increasingly vulnerable to (theoretical) attack by high altitude aircraft bombers. Such bombers could fly out of reach of ground-based, anti-aircraft guns. Another defensive option was fighter planes, specifically continual high altitude patrolling of the sky by fighters. But the time required for fighters to gain sufficient altitude to engage high altitude aircraft bombers meant this option of continuous 'standing patrols' would have been too expensive in pilot hours, engine wear and fuel consumption to have been effective.

Another option was proposed on 12 February 1935 by Watson-Watt in a memo entitled Detection and location of aircraft by radio methods sent to the Air Ministry. This detection and location method known today as radar, combined with a command and control system would act as a Force multiplier by allowing friendly fighters to know the exact location of enemy bombers and converge on them. On 26 February a successful demonstration of radar was given at Daventry, Northamptonshire. By the end of 1935 a system with a detection and location range of 100 km had been established, and plans were made in December to set up five fixed radar stations covering London airspace. One of these stations was to be located on the coast near Orford Ness, and Bawdsey Manor Research Station was set up there to become the main centre for all radar research.

=== Development of the Chapman Method including Multilateration ===
Leonard Chapman in 1937. Dora's backyard, near Biggin Hill.

During 1937, Chapman attended the Ground Radar course given by Watson-Watt at Bawdsey Manor. During 1937–1938 he devised and proposed a method for obtaining more precise measurements of target locations using differences in time arrival of a signal which became known as the 'Chapman Method' (also known as the 'Chapman System' or Multilateration). In his resume Chapman states "This was the first system to use pulse techniques and hyperbolic intersections for position finding". This proposal was implemented and evaluated by Sir Edward Fennessey, one of the Bawdsey staff. While Chapman's proposal was ultimately not used in Chain Home, the multilateration technique is now commonly used in civil and military surveillance applications to accurately locate aircraft, vehicles and stationary emitters.

=== Chain Home contributions ===
By 1937 three of the five planned radar towers were demonstrably operational and the government gave an order to build additional stations, forming a chain of fixed radar towers known as Chain Home. From 1938–1940 Chapman supervised construction of 5 Chain Home radar stations, including the Netherbutton station in Holm, Orkney Islands.

From 1941–1944 Chapman was a staff member at the Royal Air Force Scottish Headquarters serving as senior installation officer, senior training officer, and operations officer.

=== Chain Home applied ===
The Chain Home system was used in conjunction with intelligence services such as the "Y" Service radio posts, these components formed part of an overall system of integrated air defence system known as the Dowding system. This complex infrastructure of detection, command, and control provided the keystone of the British defence during the Battle of Britain. This battle engaged the German Air Force (Luftwaffe) against the United Kingdom during 1940. The objective of the numerically superior Luftwaffe was to gain air superiority over the Royal Air Force, so that Operation Sea Lion an amphibious and airborne invasion of Britain could be launched.

The outcome of the battle was a decisive British victory, a crucial turning point in the Second World War.

=== Post Second World War work ===
Chapman worked for the Royal Air Force until 1964. From 1944–1953 he was consecutively the commanding officer of a radar convoy unit, the Servicing Wing R.E.U Henlow, RAF Grangemouth, and Skendleby radar station. From 1958–1959 he worked at Scottish Sector Headquarters on radar operations and electronic countermeasures. From 1959–1960 he was the commanding officer of the North German "G" Chain. From 1961–1964 he worked at Fighter Command headquarters on ground radar servicing.

Chapman became a permanently commissioned officer on 19 May 1952.

== Work in the private sector ==
Chapman's work in the private sector included managing airfield radar maintenance at Airwork Services and managing Satellite Tracking equipment at Winkfield, near Windsor.

== Personal life ==
Winifred, Leonard & Dora

When Leonard Chapman was a school boy his mother died while giving birth to his sister, Dora. His father, George Chapman, remarried within a year to an Army Nurse, and within 3 years they had a daughter Winifred. George became a commissioned officer by working his way up from Private to Lieutenant. He did not believe that the relatively recently formed Royal Air Force was a 'real force' that could offer the same opportunities to his son as the Army. Leonard showed independence by attending Flowerdown boys and joining the Royal Air Force.

Whilst supervising construction of a radar station in Netherbutton, Orkney Islands, Leonard meet his wife to be Jemmima Leamonth, who worked in a local radio shop. They were married on 23 June 1940 at Kirkwall, Orkney Islands. Leonard would not even let Jemmima know the secret of radar.

Leonard and Jemmima remained married until Leonard's death in 1975. During their marriage they had a daughter they named Patricia. Patricia assisted Leonard with his work on Satellite Tracking at Winkfield, near Windsor.

Leonard was the second eldest child of George and Ellen. He had 3 siblings, namely a brother Victor who died young, and two sisters Dora, and Winifred. At Winifred's funeral it was said she worked at Bletchley Park with Alan Turing, but sadly no information on her contribution has been officially released.
