= Robert Rendall =

Scottish poet (1898–1967)

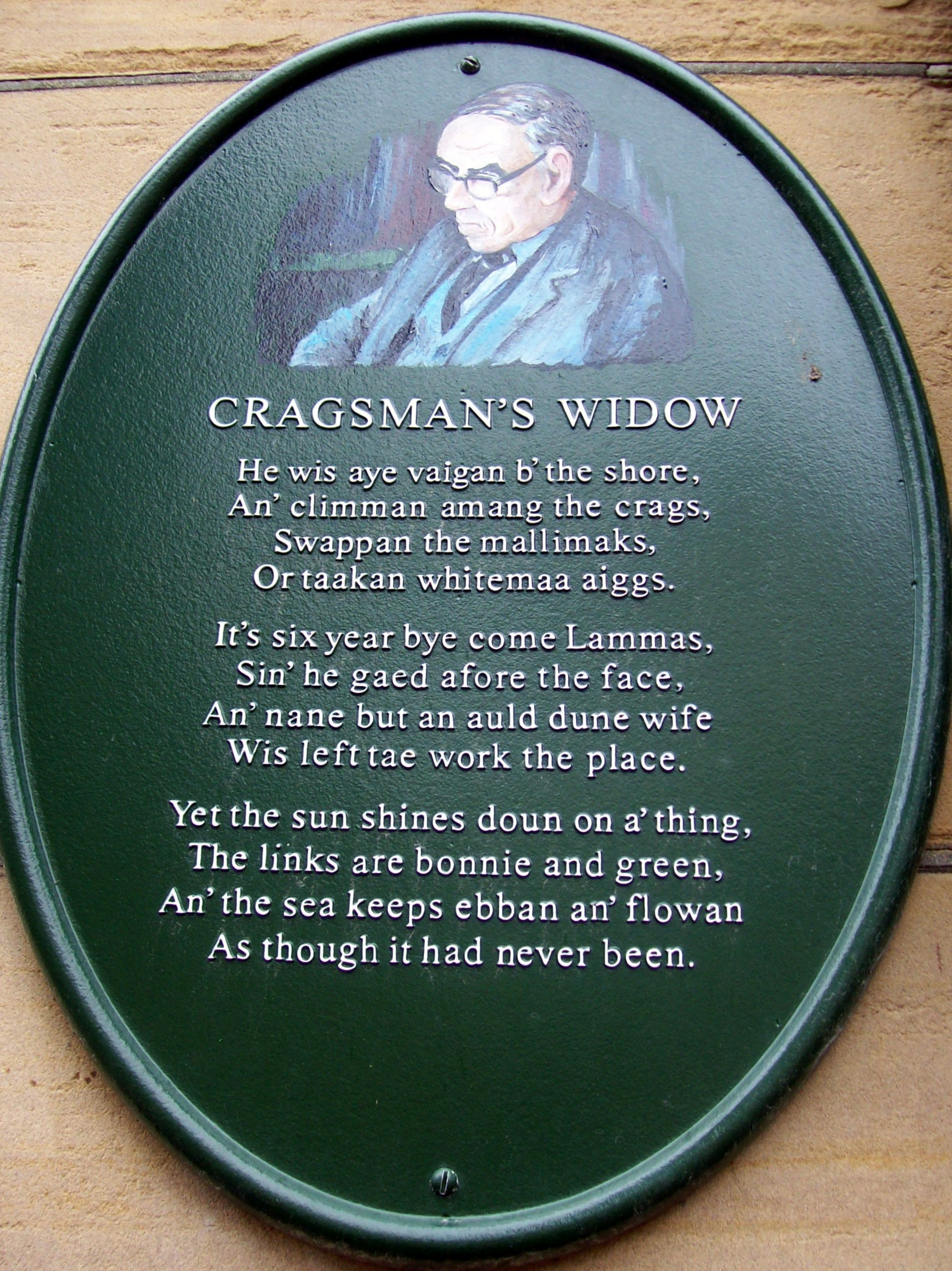
- Born: 1898; Glasgow
- Died: 1967 (aged 68–69)

Robert Rendall (1898–1967) was a Scottish poet, and amateur naturalist who spent most of his life in Kirkwall, Orkney.

== Biography ==
Robert Rendall was born in Glasgow in 1898 but moved to Orkney with his Westray parents when young. When he was seven years old he was so ill that he was not expected to live for another year. He became a converted Christian about this time. He attended Kirkwall Grammar School until he was 13, but was largely self-educated, learning much from Arthur Mee's The Children's Encyclopædia. He worked in the family draper's business in Kirkwall. He joined the Royal Navy in 1916 and served in Scapa Flow during World War I.

Rendall, a man of many talents, known as a poet, and authority on shells, flowers, and marine life, has been described as an "Orcadian Renaissance man". He accidentally discovered the Broch of Gurness in 1929.

In 1946 he semi-retired from business, and devoted his life to his scientific and cultural interests, and fishing. This was the year in which he published Country Sonnets, which included many poems written in the Orkney dialect. Rendall became a friend of the writer George Mackay Brown, whom he encouraged, and who had appreciated the quality of his best poetry, having been introduced to him by Ernest Marwick Brown was encouraged by Rendall's visits when he was confined to Eastbank Sanatorium. In 1956 Rendall published Mollusca Orcadensia, a paper which brings together from all available sources records of marine mollusca indigenous to Orkney, which he had commenced in 1916. He published Orkney Shore, a work on the seashore life of Orkney, in 1960. It has been said, "All his studies – whether scientific, archaeological, theological or literary – were rooted in Orkney, and a love of the islands drove the rigour which he applied to each of his chosen areas".

Rendall was a small, dark, man, profoundly deaf, and a bachelor. He was a member of the Open Brethren.

Rendall died in 1967. A plaque bearing his name is in the presbytery of St Magnus Cathedral. A biography, An Island Shore: the Life and Work of Robert Rendall, by Neil Dickson was published in 1990, while an essay on his work is included in George Mackay Brown's An Orkney Tapestry in 1969.

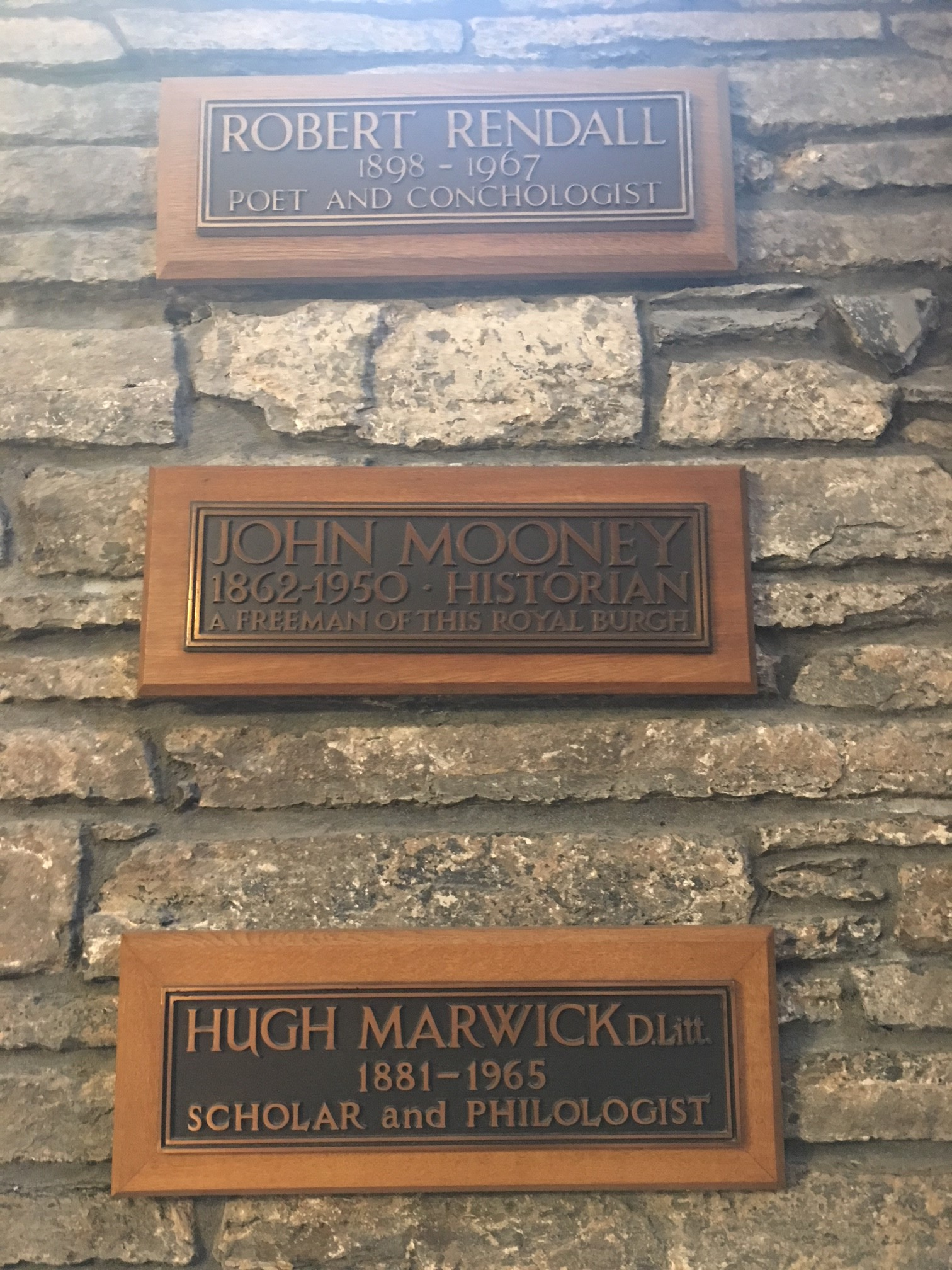
Memorial to Robert Rendall in Kirkwall Cathedral, Orkney

== Critical Opinion ==
It has been said that the poetry of Robert Rendall "represents the eventual regenerative reaction to the transplanted, anglicised expression which had prevented Orkney from producing any significant or lasting poetry during the nineteenth century ... The work represents a cultured fusion of Orcadian vernacular, philosophical Christian content and refined form".

George Mackay Brown's view was that the poetic work of Rendall was patchy, but when good it was very good indeed. And the poem Renewal was one of the most perfect sonnets he knew.

Ron Ferguson, the writer, says that he is a poet of substance, and that his best poems are in the Orcadian dialect.

== Works ==
Poetry:

- Country Sonnets (1946)
- Orkney Variants (1951)
- Shore Poems (1957)

Theology

- History, Prophecy and God (1954)

Scientific

- Mollusca Orcadensia (1956)
- Orkney Shore (1960)
