= John M. Mason (musician) =

Scottish musician

John M. Mason, MBE (21 January 1940 – 22 January 2011) was a Scottish solicitor, musician, composer and conductor. He was the co-founder, musical director, and conductor of the Scottish Fiddle Orchestra from its creation in 1980 until his death in 2011.

== Early life and education ==
John M. Mason, MBE was born in Kirkwall, Scotland in 1940 to James and Tomima (Toza) Mason. He attended Kirkwall Grammar School, before moving to Wigtown with his family after the war. He then attended Douglas Ewert High School in Newton Stewart, and graduated from the University of Edinburgh with a law degree.

Both of Mason's parents were musicians, his father played the fiddle and his mother the piano, and he took up both instruments in childhood. Upon his father's insistence, he left his fiddle at home while attending university so he could focus entirely on his studies, but he picked it up again during the summer holidays. He joined the Mona Stewart Dance Band, and with them played at weddings and bookings all over southwest Scotland.

== Career ==
After his marriage in 1967, Mason moved to Troon, Scotland, where he took a position as a solicitor with Waddell & MacIntosh Solicitors. During his time there, he rose to the position of company director. Following his passing in 2011, his eldest son, Rognvald Mason, assumed the position of Director at Waddell and Mackintosh solicitors, alongside solicitor Darren Murdoch. He was soon invited to join the Kilmarnock Caledonian Strathspey and Reel Society, and in 1972, he helped in the formation of the Ayr and Prestwick Strathspey and Reel Society, for which he served as conductor. Following this success, he co-founded the Scottish Fiddle Orchestra with fellow musician Gerry Crean in 1980 . He served as the musical director and principal conductor of the orchestra from its creation until his death in 2011. Under John's leadership, the orchestra played concerts all over the United Kingdom, as well as a handful of international tours, in order to raise money for various charities. Along with John's arrangements of traditional Scottish fiddle music, the orchestra continues to play many of John's original compositions, which numbered over 600.

In 1987, Mason received an MBE from Her Majesty the Queen for services to music.

== Compositions ==
Over his lifetime, Mason wrote more than 600 original compositions. Below are some of his compositions from recordings.

- The Arran Shepard
- Ceud Mile Failte
- Drumadoon
- The Dunlop Strathspey
- Father Eammon Gilmartin
- Fiddlers to the Fore
- The Flower of Portencross
- Hamish The Boot
- The Hardanger
- Hibiscus Two Step
- Hills of Bardi
- Home to Bon Accord
- John Mason's Compliments To The Rev. James Currie
- Keltic Odyssey
- Lament for the Death of Rev. Archie Beaton
- The Lairds Ferret
- Lord Elgin's Welcome
- The Old Man of Hoy
- The Orcadian
- Our Princess Royal
- Patrol
- The Rose of Galloway
- Scented Fairy Bower
- The Shetlander
- Silent Strings
- The Spirit Of Strathisla
- John Mason's Compliments To The Rev. James Currie
- Sunset Song (Afore the Grimleens)
- Wild Rose Of The Mountains
- Willie Kidd's Welcome to Orkney
