= Dounby =

Coordinates: 59.068°N 3.231°W

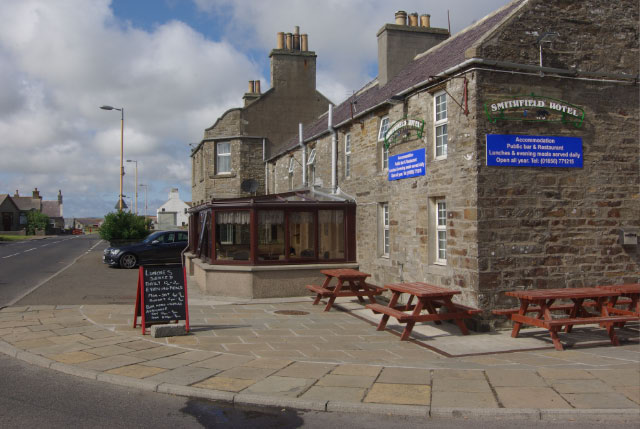
- The Smithfield Hotel stands at the crossroads where the A986 and B9057 meet

- Location within Orkney
- OS grid reference: HY290207
- Civil parish
- Council area: Orkney Islands
- Lieutenancy area: Orkney Islands
- Country: Scotland
- Sovereign state: United Kingdom
- Post town: ORKNEY
- Postcode district: KW17
- Dialling code: 01856
- Police: Scotland
- Fire: Scottish
- Ambulance: Scottish
- UK Parliament: Orkney and Shetland
- Scottish Parliament: Orkney

Dounby (UK: /ˈduːnbiː/) is a village on Mainland in Orkney, in the north of Scotland.

Dounby village is situated at the crossroads of what are now the A986 and B9057, and has grown close to the meeting point of the three parishes of Sandwick, Birsay and Harray (mainly lying in Sandwick). It features an Asda Express petrol station and store, a doctor's surgery, pharmacy, care home, pub, post office, hairdressers, church and a community school that serve the parishes of Birsay, Harray, & Sandwick which until the 1970s each of the three parishes had its own schools.

The West Mainland Agricultural Show (commonly called the Dounby Show) occurs here every August on the Thursday before the Orkney County Show in Kirkwall. The County show is always the 2nd Saturday in August.
