= Stromness =

Coordinates: 58.96°N 3.3°W

Stromness: Scots: Strumnis
- Town
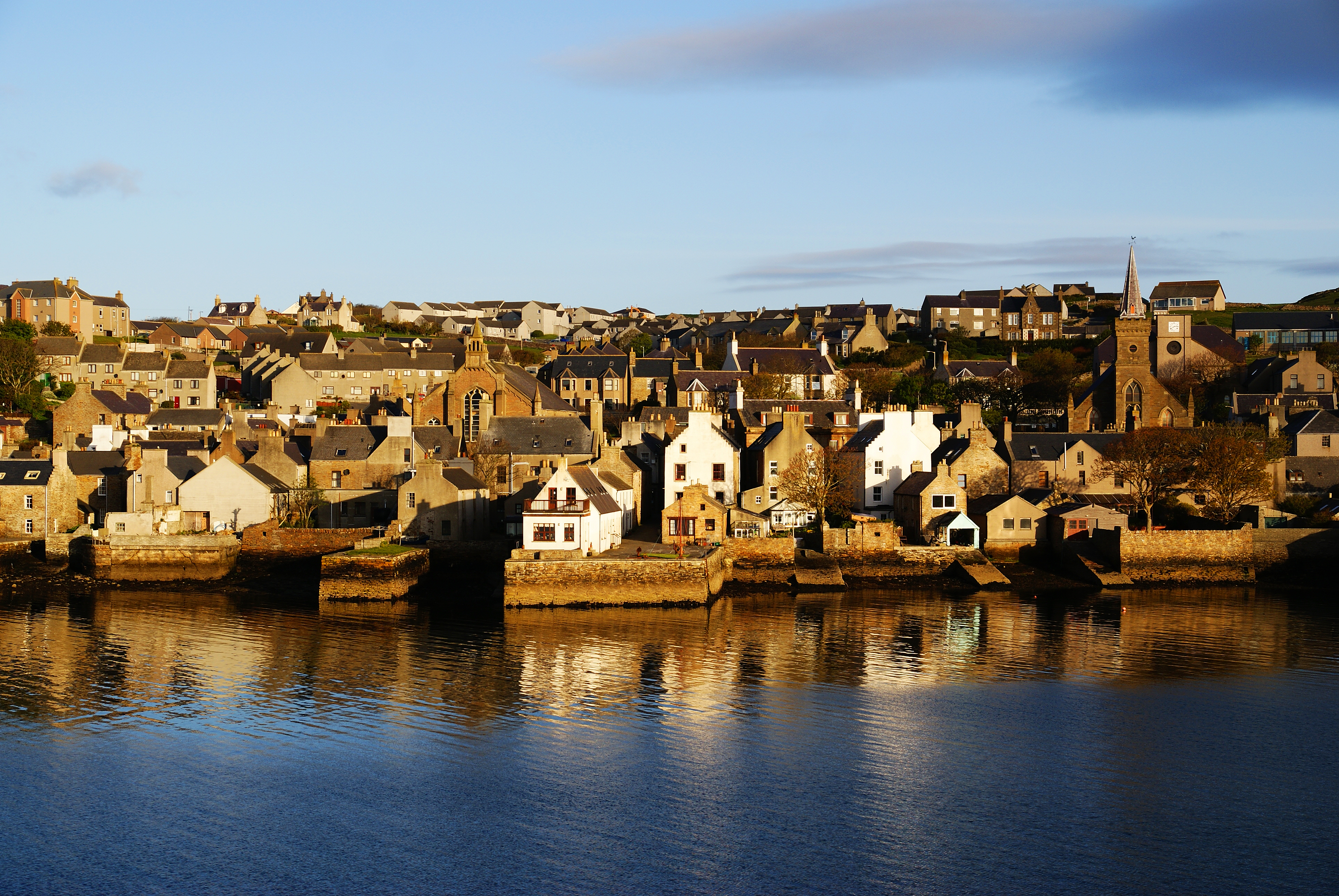
- A view of Stromness

- Location within Orkney
- Area: 0.89 km^{2} (0.34 sq mi)
- Population: 1,700 (2022)
  - Density: 1,910/km^{2} (4,900/sq mi)
- Demonym: Stromnessian
- OS grid reference: HY2509
  - Edinburgh: 208 mi (335 km)
  - London: 530 mi (853 km)
- Council area: Orkney Islands
- Lieutenancy area: Orkney Islands
- Country: Scotland
- Sovereign state: United Kingdom
- Post town: STROMNESS
- Postcode district: KW16
- Dialling code: 01856
- Police: Scotland
- Fire: Scottish
- Ambulance: Scottish
- UK Parliament: Orkney and Shetland
- Scottish Parliament: Orkney

Stromness (locally /ˈstrʌmnɪs/, Old Norse: Straumnes; Norn: Stromnes) is historic seaside town and burgh in Orkney, Scotland. It is in the southwestern part of the Orkney Mainland. It has a parish around the outside with the town of Stromness as its capital.

A long-established seaport, Stromness has a population of 1,700 in 2022, making it the second most-populous settlement in the Orkney archipelago. The old town is clustered along the characterful and winding main street, flanked by houses and shops built from local stone, with narrow lanes and alleys branching off it.

== Etymology ==
The name "Stromness" comes from the Old Norse Straumnes. Straumr refers to the strong tides that rip past the Point of Ness through Hoy Sound to the south of the town. Nes means "headland". Stromness thus means "headland protruding into the tidal stream". In Viking times the anchorage where Stromness now stands was called Hamnavoe.

== History ==
First recorded as the site of an inn in the sixteenth century, Stromness became important during the late seventeenth century, when Great Britain was at war with France and shipping was forced to avoid the English Channel. Ships of the Hudson's Bay Company were regular visitors, as were whaling fleets. Large numbers of Orkneymen, many of whom came from the Stromness area, served as traders, explorers and seamen for both. Captain Cook's ships, Discovery and Resolution, called at the town in 1780 on their return voyage from the Hawaiian Islands, where Captain Cook had been killed.

Stromness Museum reflects these aspects of the town's history (displaying for example important collections of whaling relics, and Inuit artefacts brought back as souvenirs by local men from Greenland and Arctic Canada).

Stromness harbour was rebuilt to the designs of John Barron in 1893.

The statistics for Stromeness show that fishing was in decline in the years before the First World War. The Annual Report of the Fishery Board for 1913 states: "Local fishermen engaged in line and lobster fishing. Herrings all landed by stranger crews."

Fishery Statistics

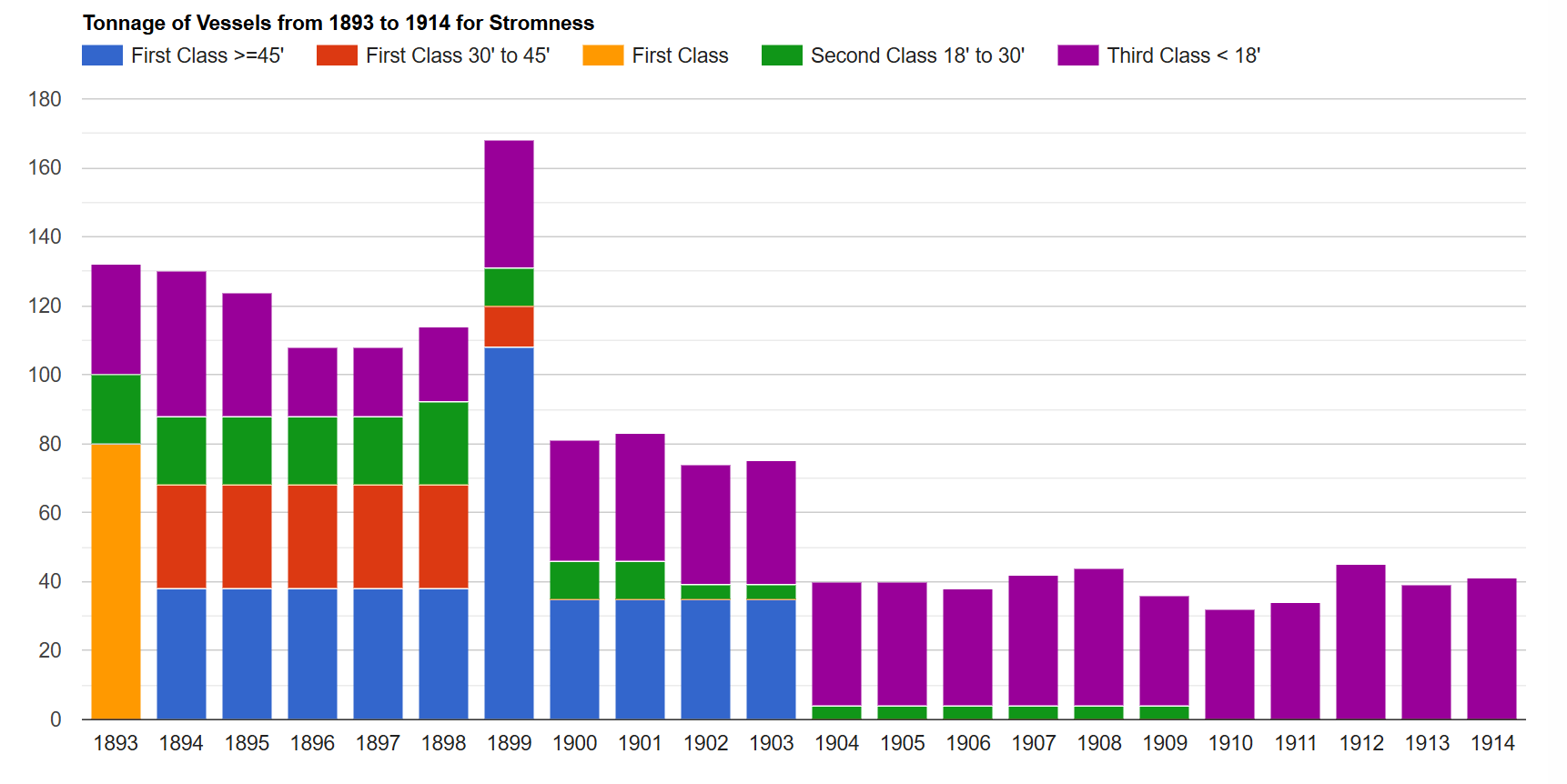
Tonnage of vessels

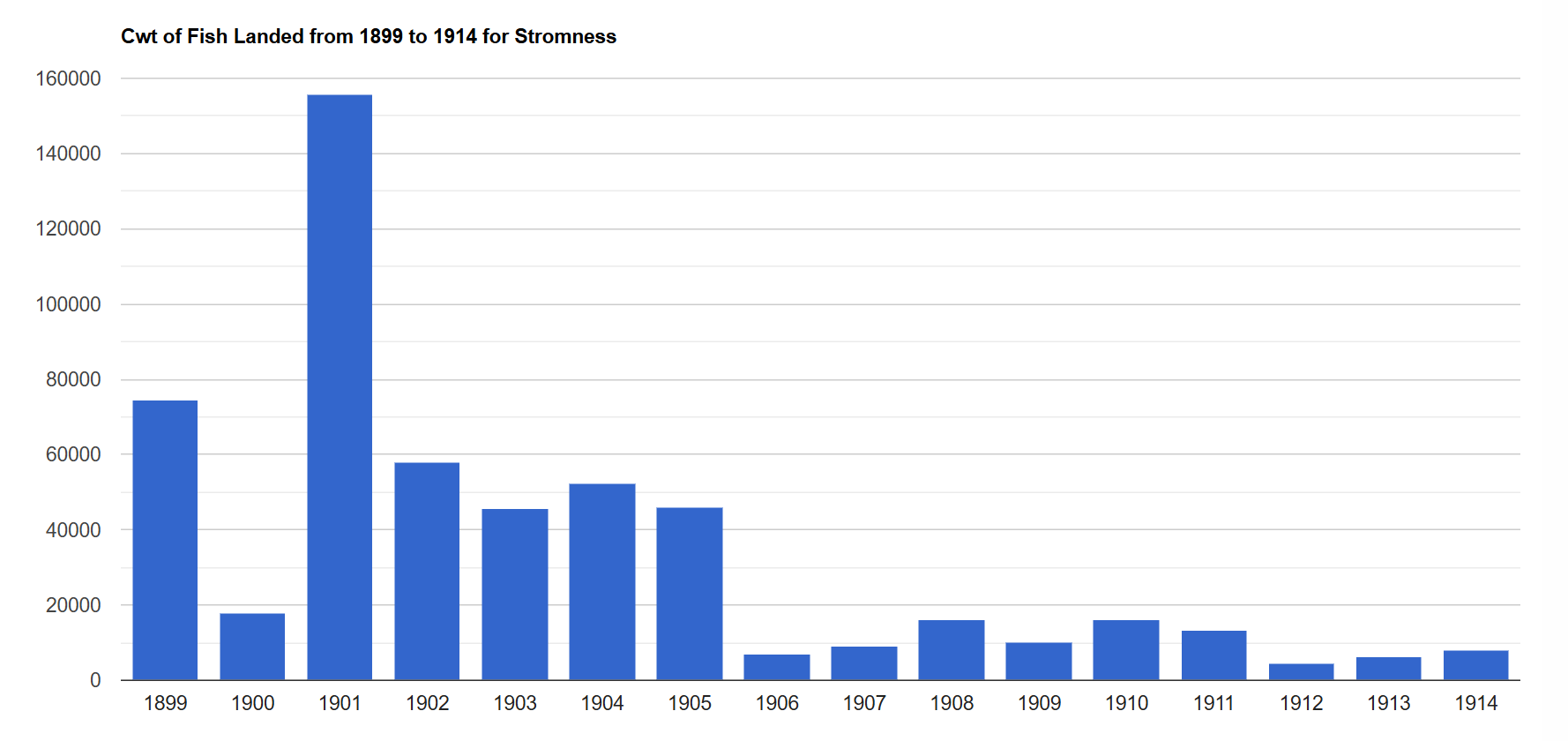
Cwt of fish landed

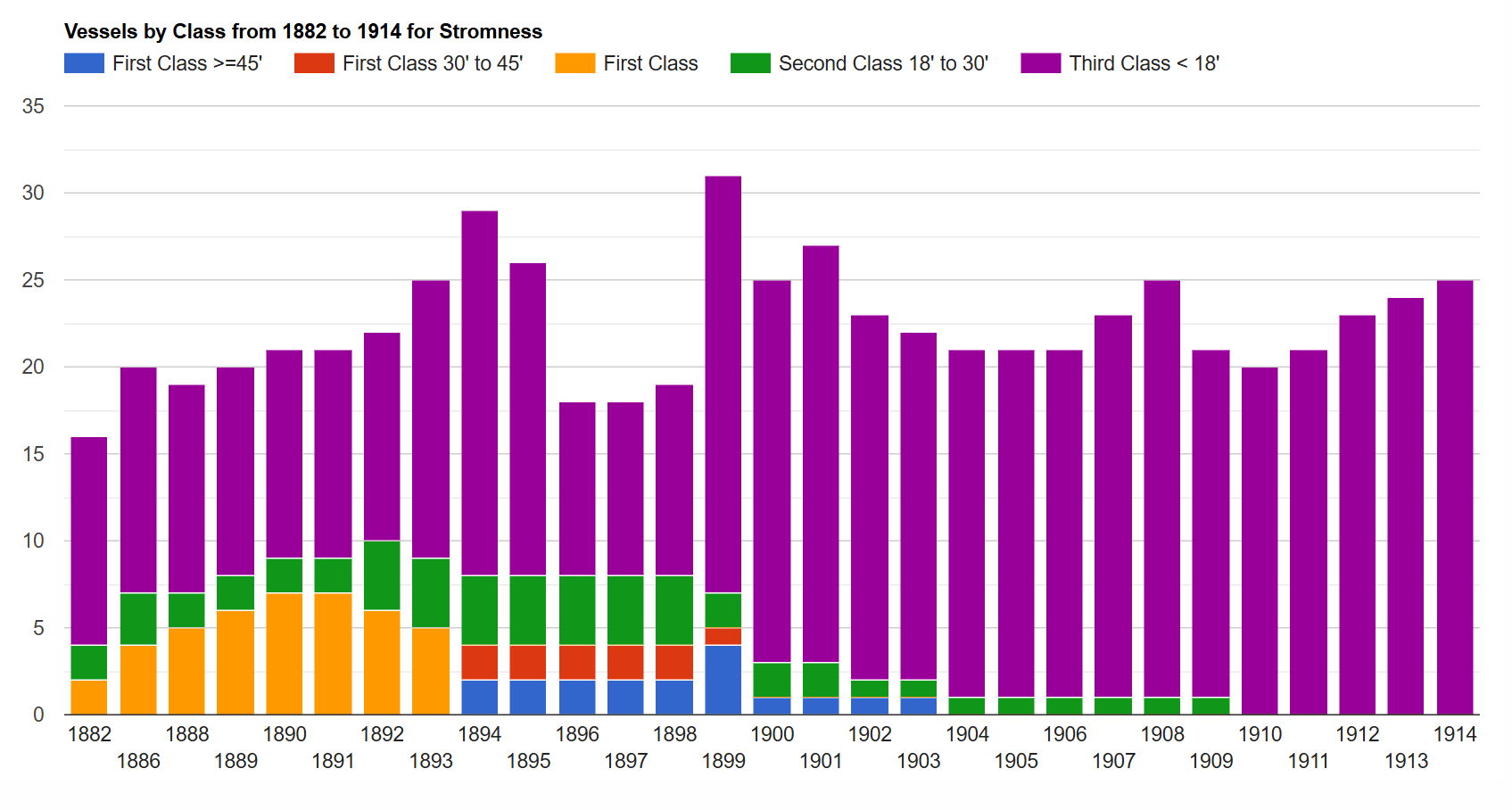
Vessels by class

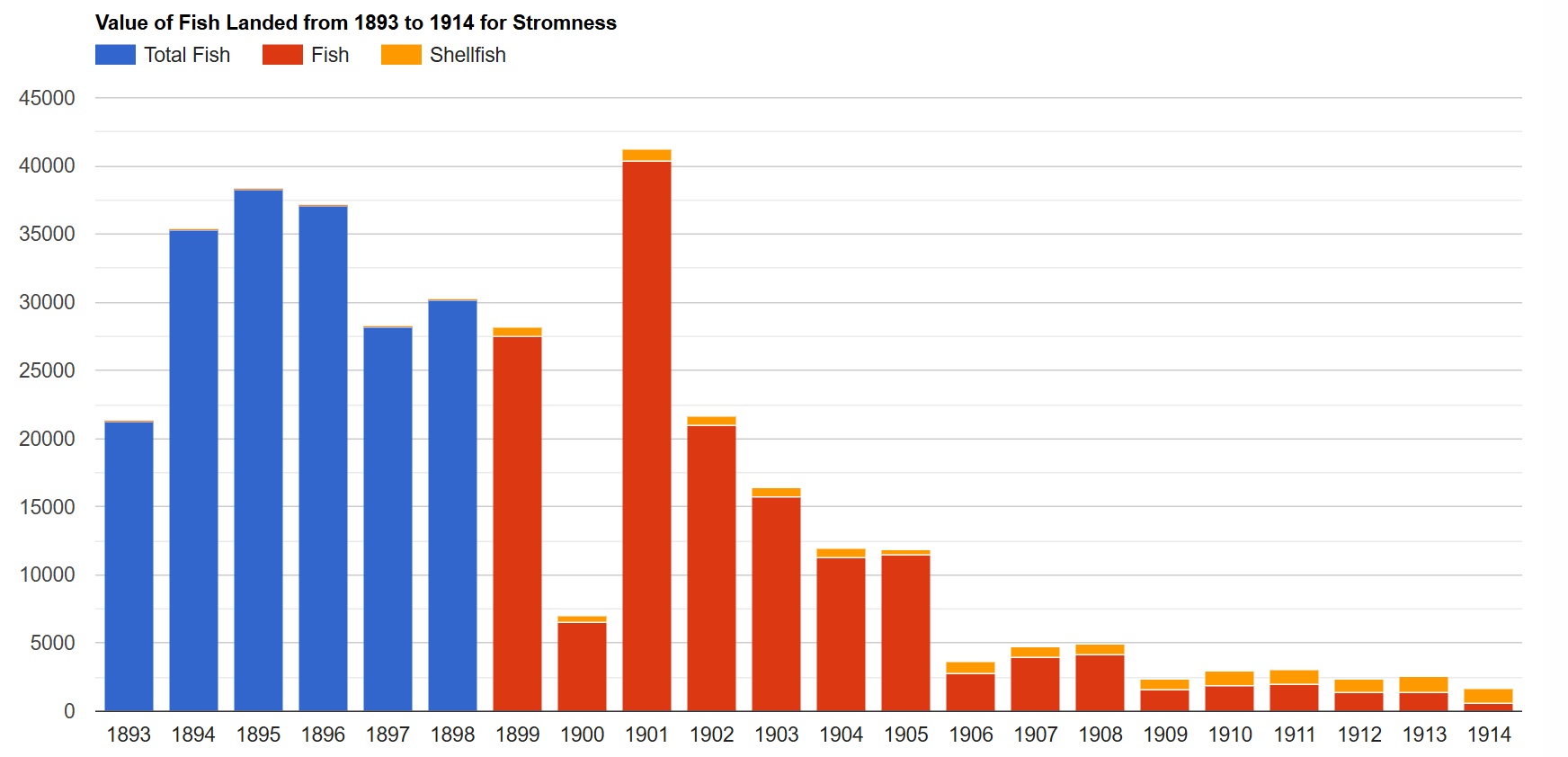
Value (£) of fish landed

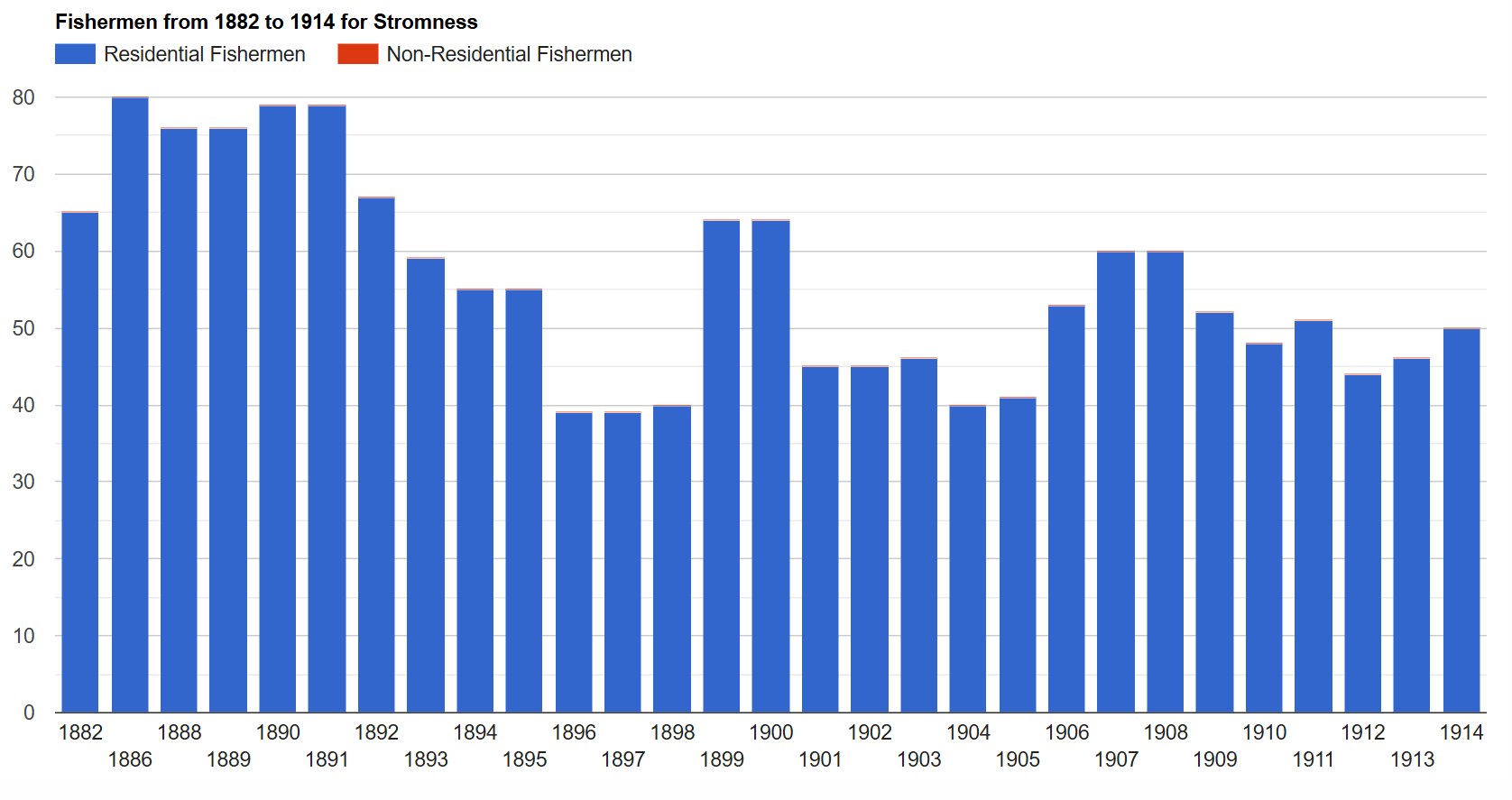
Fishermen

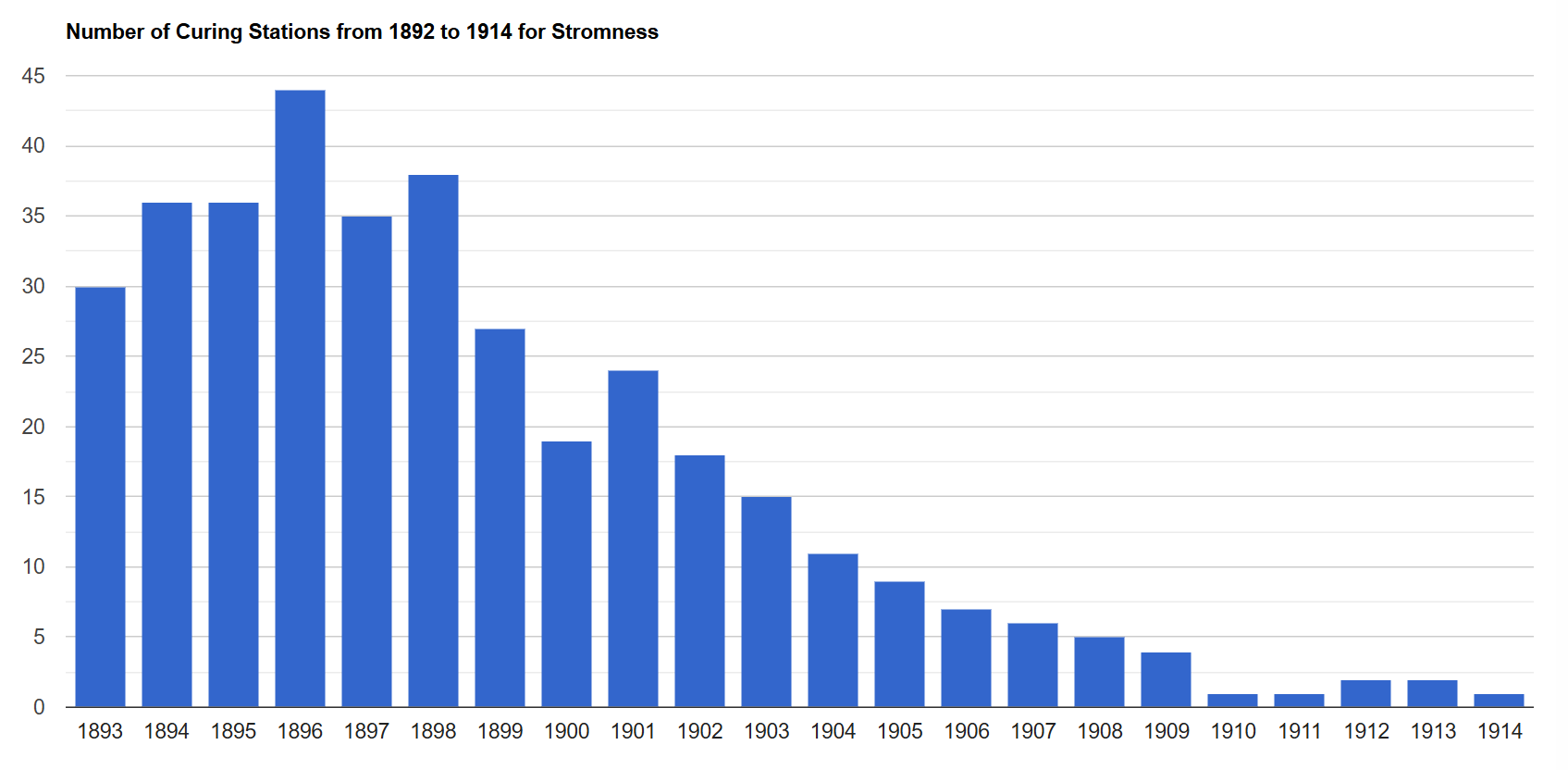
Number of curing stations

At Stromness Pierhead is a statue by North Ronaldsay sculptor Ian Scott, depicting John Rae standing erect with an inscription describing him as "the discoverer of the final link in the first navigable Northwest Passage", which was unveiled in 2013.

Stromness Lifeboat Station is the town’s lifeboat station, one of three lifeboat stations in Orkney (the others being Longhope Lifeboat Station and Kirkwall Lifeboat Station). A lifeboat was first stationed here by the Royal National Lifeboat Institution (RNLI) in 1867. Stromness is served by two passenger ferries: the MV Hamnavoe, run by Northlink Ferries, connects the town to Scrabster, and the MV Graemsay, operated by Orkney Ferries, runs to Graemsay and Hoy, Orkney.

== Education ==
Stromness has two schools, Stromness Academy, a secondary school and Stromness Primary School, a primary school.

== Parish ==
The parish of Stromness includes the islands of Hoy and Graemsay in addition to a tract of land about 5 by 3 3/4 miles (8.0 by 6.0 kilometres) on Mainland, Orkney. The Mainland part is bounded on the west by the Atlantic Ocean, on the south and southeast by Hoy Sound, and on the northeast by the Loch of Stenness.

Antiquities include Breckness House, erected in 1633 by George Graham, Bishop of Orkney, at the west entrance of Hoy Sound.

== Notable people ==
- Thomas Login (1823–1874), civil engineer remembered for his road and canal works in India

== Media and the arts ==
The Stromness branch of the Orkney Library and Archive is housed in a building given to the library service in 1905 by Marjory Skea Corrigall.

Writer George Mackay Brown (1921–1996) was born and lived most of his life in the town, and is buried in the town's cemetery overlooking Hoy Sound. His poem "Hamnavoe" is set in the town, and is in part a memorial to his father John, a local postman.

Stromness is also named in the title of Sir Peter Maxwell Davies's popular piano piece "Farewell to Stromness", a piano interlude from The Yellow Cake Revue, which was written in 1980 to protest against plans to open a uranium mine in the area. The title refers to yellowcake, the powder produced in an early stage of the processing of uranium ore. The Revue was first performed by the composer at the Stromness Hotel on 21 June 1980, as part of the St Magnus Festival; plans for the uranium mine were cancelled later that year.

Stromness is also the title of a 2009 novel by Herbert Wetterauer.

Stromness plays host to the Pier Arts Centre, a collection of twentieth-century British art given to the people of Orkney by artists such as Margaret Gardiner.

== Geology ==
Stromness presents to the Atlantic a range of cliffs between 100 and 500 feet (30 and 150 metres) high, and to Hoy Sound a band of fertile lowlands. The rocks possess great geological interest, and were made well known by the publication of the evangelical geologist Hugh Miller, The Footprints of the Creator or The Asterolepsis of Stromness (1849).

== Gallery ==
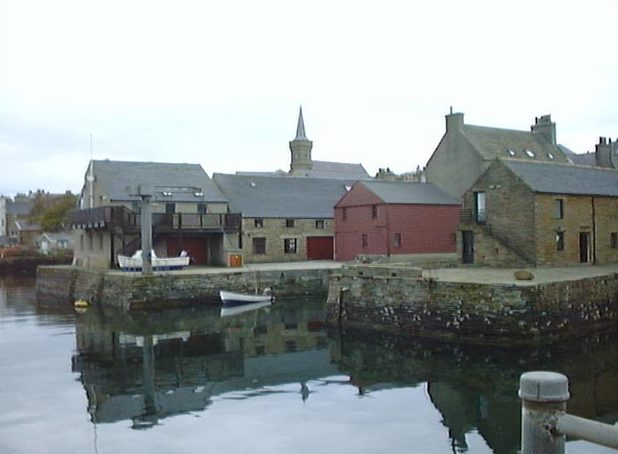
The Pier, Stromness

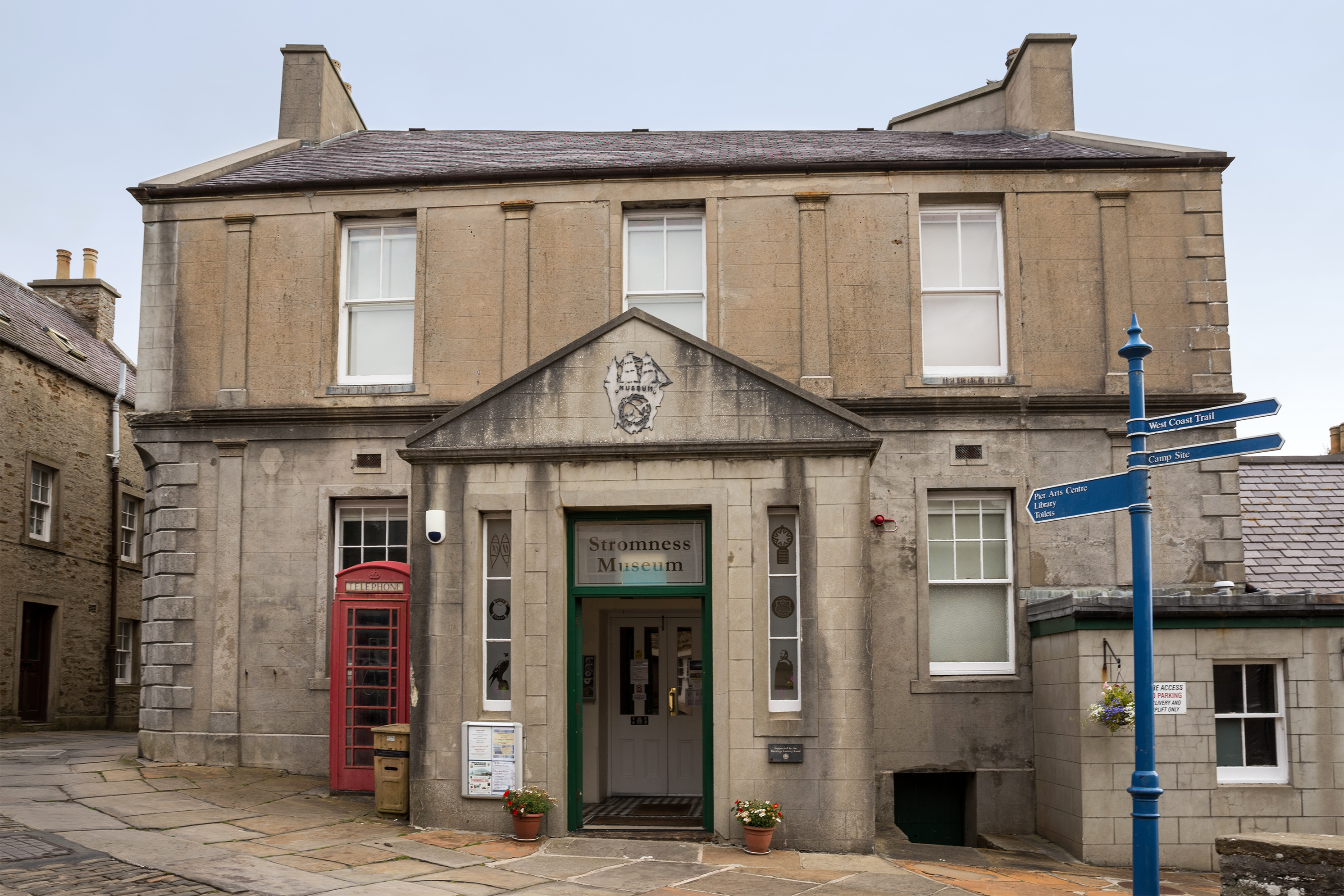
Stromness Museum

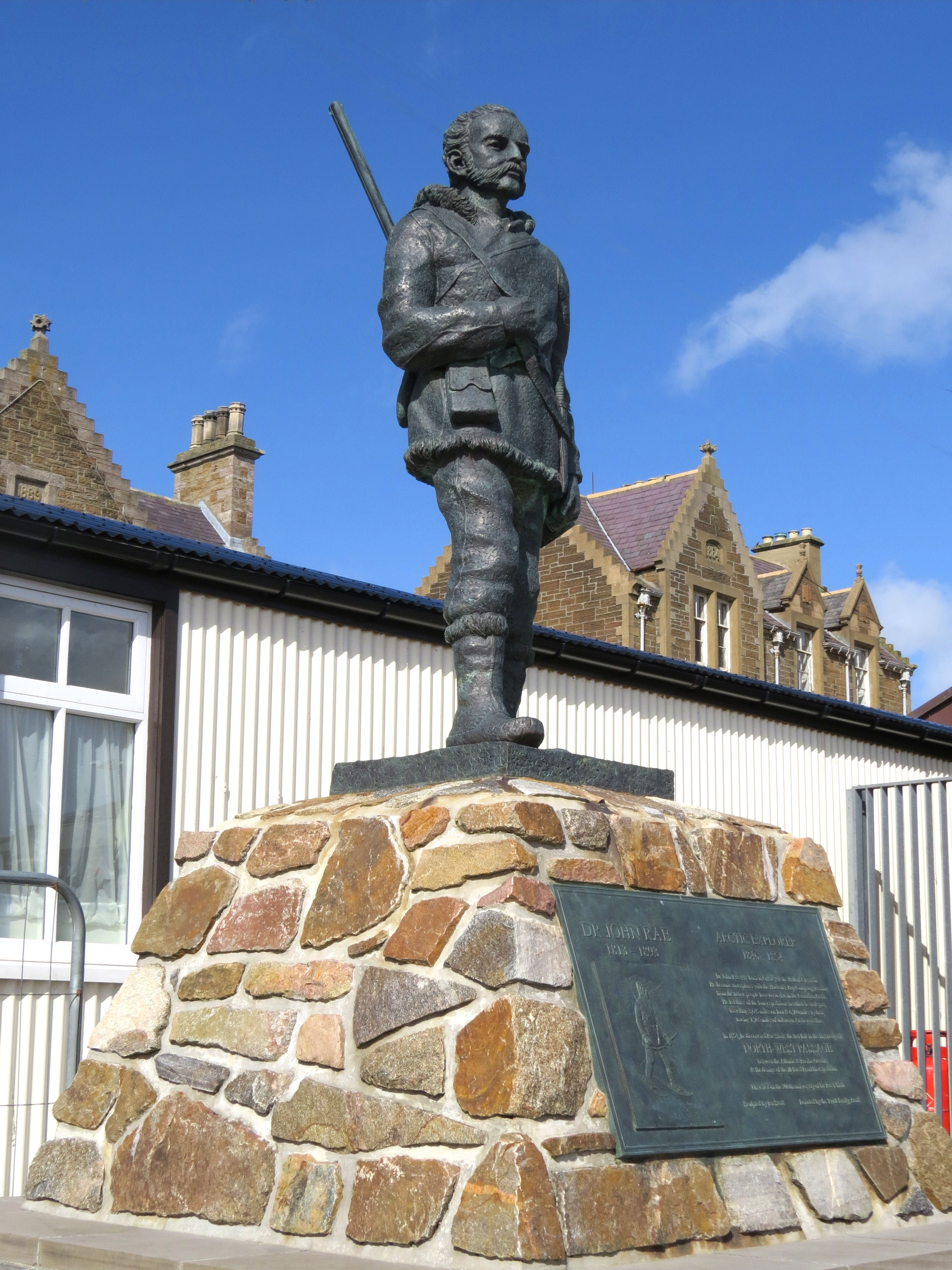
Statue of John Rae

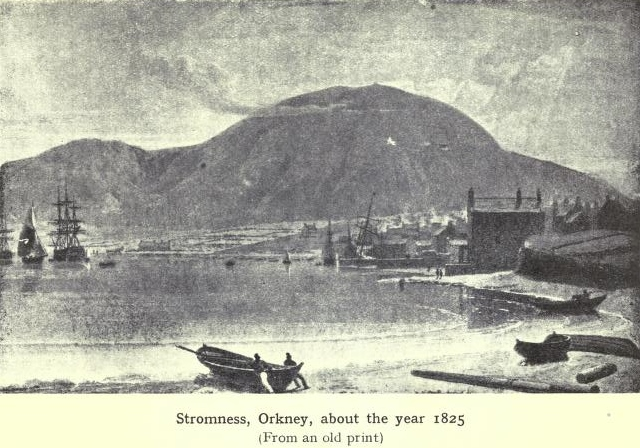
Stromness in 1825

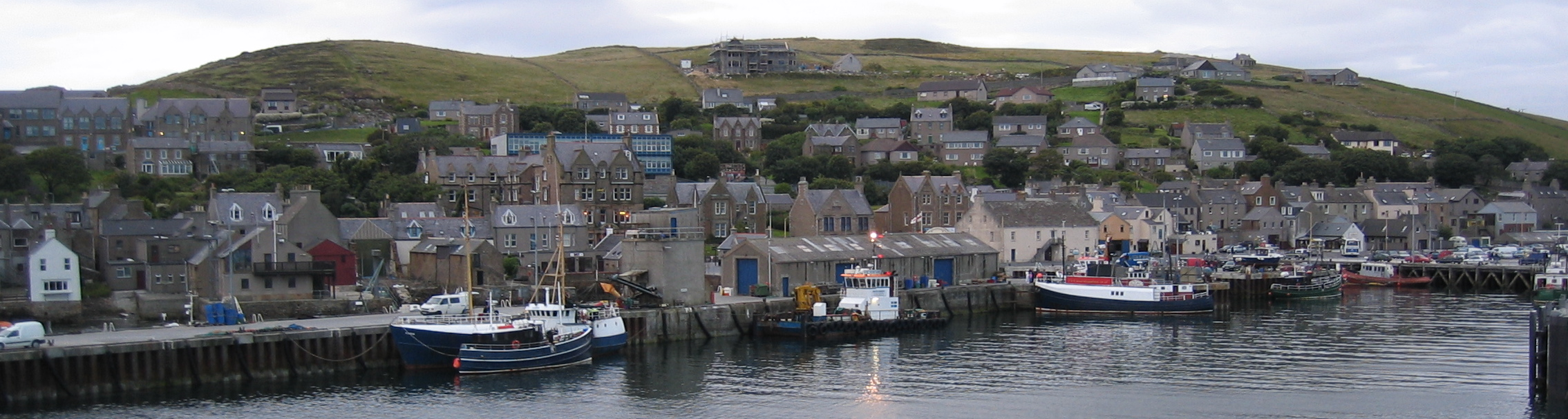
Stromness Harbour
