= Holm, Orkney =

Parish on Mainland, Orkney, Scotland

Coordinates: 58°54′50″N 2°53′0″W

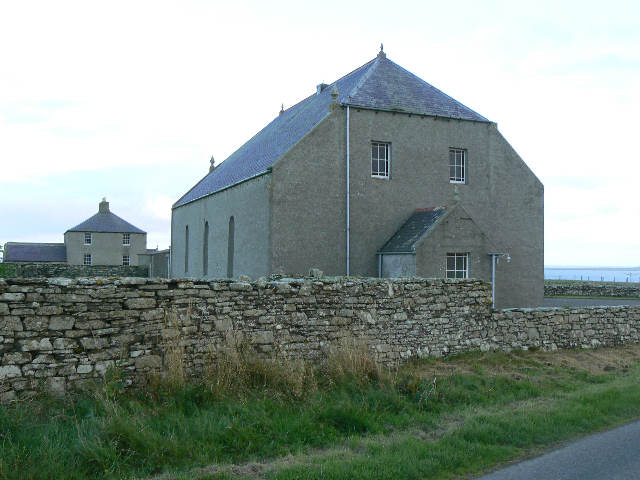
Holm church and manse.

Holm (pronounced /hæm/), also spelled Ham, is a parish on Mainland, Orkney.

An adjacent Sound, running between Mainland, and Burray, is named after Holm. It has since been blocked up by the Churchill Barriers. The parish flanks the north side of the Sound and extends to within 2.5 miles (4.0 km) of Kirkwall, and contains the village of St Mary's Holm, as well as the island of Lamb Holm. The Mainland section is 6 miles (9.7 km) by 2 miles (3.2 km).

The shores are mostly rocky, and the interior consists of light thin, loamy land.

Orkney F.C., the island group's main football club, played its home games at The Rockworks Community ground near St. Mary's Holm until the pitch was wrecked in 2023. The pitch has just been replaced ahead of the 2025 Island Games.

== Church and manse ==
Holm church and manse are both of unusual design. The church has no spire or turret, and the manse is constructed so that all chimneys appear through the centre of a pyramidal roof.

== World War II ==
Netherbutton Radar Station, which was part of the Chain Home system, was situated on both sides of the A961 road, although little now remains except four concrete mast bases. Its construction was supervised by Leonard Chapman, who then held the rank of corporal.

== Notable people ==
- F. Marian McNeill, folklorist, suffragist and a founder of the Scottish National Party. Her father was Free Church minister of Holm for nearly fifty years, and her brother Duncan was also a writer.
