= List of listed buildings in Kirkwall, Orkney =

This is a list of listed buildings in the parish of Kirkwall in Orkney, Scotland.

== List ==
Name	Location	Date Listed	Grid Ref. (Note: Sometimes known as OSGB36, the grid reference (where provided) is based on the British national grid reference system used by the Ordnance Survey. • "Guide to National Grid". Ordnance Survey. • "Get-a-map". Ordnance Survey.)	Geo-coordinates	Notes	LB Number (Note: Historic Environment Scotland assign a unique alphanumeric identifier to each designated site in Scotland, for listed buildings this always begins with "LB", for example "LB12345".)	Image
King Street Church, Church Of Scotland, Including Boundary Walls, Railings And Gates				58°58′57″N 2°57′25″W	Category C(S)	45598	Upload Photo
35 Albert Street				58°58′59″N 2°57′34″W	Category C(S)	36780	Upload Photo
15-18 (Inclusive Numbers) St Catherine's Place				58°59′05″N 2°57′20″W	Category B	36797	Upload Photo
19 And 20 St Catherine's Place, Including Ancillary Building				58°59′04″N 2°57′21″W	Category B	36798	Upload Photo
21 And 22 St Catherine's Place, Including Ancillary Buildings				58°59′04″N 2°57′21″W	Category B	36799	Upload Photo
East Road, Daisybank House, Including Boundary Walls And Gatepiers				58°59′03″N 2°57′04″W	Category B	36806	Upload Photo
Berstane Road, Papdale House, Walled Garden Including Doocot				58°58′52″N 2°56′51″W	Category B	36808	Upload Photo
1-6 (Inclusive Numbers) The Strynd, North Side				58°58′56″N 2°57′33″W	Category B	36670	Upload Photo
3-9, (Odd Numbers) Palace Road				58°58′52″N 2°57′37″W	Category C(S)	36681	Upload Photo
7 Victoria Street, Including Courtyard Walls And Railings				58°58′51″N 2°57′41″W	Category C(S)	36686	Upload Photo
22-26 (Even Numbers) Victoria Street				58°58′50″N 2°57′40″W	Category B	36689	Upload Photo
3, 4, 5, 6 And 7 Spence's Square				58°58′45″N 2°57′40″W	Category B	36707	Upload Photo
18 And 20 Clay Loan				58°58′43″N 2°57′38″W	Category C(S)	36719	Upload Photo
2-4 (Even Numbers) Wellington Street, Including Ancillary Building And Boundary Walls				58°58′40″N 2°57′49″W	Category B	36731	Upload Photo
6 And 8 Wellington Street				58°58′40″N 2°57′50″W	Category B	36732	Upload Photo
26 Wellington Street				58°58′39″N 2°57′55″W	Category C(S)	36736	Upload Photo
2 High Street				58°58′39″N 2°57′58″W	Category C(S)	36740	Upload Photo
20 High Street				58°58′38″N 2°58′02″W	Category C(S)	36748	Upload Photo
Harbour Street, The Ayre Hotel				58°59′04″N 2°57′46″W	Category B	36754	Upload Photo
2 Bridge Street And Shore Street				58°59′05″N 2°57′30″W	Category C(S)	36757	Upload Photo
19 Bridge Street				58°59′03″N 2°57′30″W	Category C(S)	36762	Upload Photo
63 And 65 Albert Street				58°58′57″N 2°57′36″W	Category C(S)	45965	Upload Photo
67 And 69 Albert Street				58°58′57″N 2°57′36″W	Category C(S)	45966	Upload Photo
Bignold Park Pavilion				58°58′36″N 2°57′14″W	Category C(S)	45975	Upload Photo
5 East Road, Including Boundary Walls And Railings				58°59′02″N 2°57′19″W	Category C(S)	45990	Upload Photo
9 And 11 East Road				58°59′02″N 2°57′18″W	Category C(S)	45991	Upload Photo
Glaitness Road, Glaitness House, Including Boundary Walls, Gatepiers And Gates				58°58′42″N 2°58′17″W	Category C(S)	45995	Upload Photo
Harbour Street, Former Fish Processing Plant				58°59′03″N 2°57′42″W	Category B	45996	Upload Photo
Kirkwall Harbour				58°59′07″N 2°57′35″W	Category B	46001	Upload another image
7 Nicolson Street, Including Boundary Walls				58°58′33″N 2°58′03″W	Category C(S)	46008	Upload Photo
10 St Olaf's Wynd				58°59′02″N 2°57′26″W	Category C(S)	46012	Upload Photo
School Place, Paterson Church/East Church, Including Boundary Walls And Railings				58°58′52″N 2°57′22″W	Category B	46013	Upload Photo
Watergate Street And Victoria Road, Colwyn, Including Boundary Walls And Railings				58°58′46″N 2°57′35″W	Category B	46030	Upload Photo
43 Albert Street, (I), Patrick Traill's House, Including Boundary Walls				58°58′59″N 2°57′33″W	Category B	36782	Upload Photo
43 Albert Street (Ii)				58°58′59″N 2°57′34″W	Category B	36783	Upload Photo
16-18 (Even Numbers) Shore Street, 'John Pottinger's House'				58°59′05″N 2°57′28″W	Category B	36790	Upload Photo
9-12 (Inclusive Numbers) St Catherine's Place				58°59′05″N 2°57′21″W	Category B	36795	Upload Photo
The Strynd Walls Including Store House, South Side				58°58′56″N 2°57′34″W	Category B	36669	Upload Photo
4 Broad Street				58°58′56″N 2°57′35″W	Category B	36672	Upload Photo
Palace Road And Watergate Street, The Bishop's Palace				58°58′51″N 2°57′35″W	Category A	36682	Upload another image
62 And 64 Victoria Street				58°58′47″N 2°57′41″W	Category B	36704	Upload Photo
6 Union Street				58°58′44″N 2°57′43″W	Category B	36715	Upload another image
6 High Street				58°58′39″N 2°57′59″W	Category C(S)	36742	Upload Photo
20 Harbour Street, Girnel Keeper's House				58°59′04″N 2°57′35″W	Category B	36756	Upload Photo
1 Bridge Street				58°59′04″N 2°57′32″W	Category C(S)	36758	Upload Photo
31 And 33 Bridge Street				58°59′02″N 2°57′29″W	Category B	36764	Upload Photo
12 And 14 Queen Street, Including Boundary Walls And Railings				58°59′00″N 2°57′23″W	Category B	36770	Upload Photo
6 And 8 King Street, Including Ancillary Building, Boundary Walls And Railings				58°58′56″N 2°57′26″W	Category B	36771	Upload Photo
27 And 29 Albert Street				58°59′00″N 2°57′32″W	Category C(S)	36777	Upload Photo
Ayre Road, Former Ayre Mills				58°59′09″N 2°58′12″W	Category C(S)	45971	Upload Photo
Kirkwall Bowling Green, Bowling Pavilion				58°58′49″N 2°57′31″W	Category C(S)	45977	Upload Photo
13 East Road, Including Boundary Walls				58°59′02″N 2°57′16″W	Category C(S)	45992	Upload Photo
19 And 21 East Road, Including Boundary Walls And Railings				58°59′03″N 2°57′12″W	Category C(S)	45994	Upload Photo
Laing Street, Kirkwall Public Library				58°58′59″N 2°57′28″W	Category B	46003	Upload Photo
Mill Street, Garmisgarth, Including Boundary Wall				58°58′55″N 2°57′22″W	Category B	46006	Upload Photo
3 School Place, Including Boundary Walls				58°58′53″N 2°57′27″W	Category C(S)	46014	Upload Photo
5 School Place, Including Boundary Walls				58°58′52″N 2°57′26″W	Category B	46015	Upload Photo
10 School Place				58°58′52″N 2°57′24″W	Category C(S)	46019	Upload Photo
79 And 81 Victoria Street				58°58′45″N 2°57′42″W	Category B	46026	Upload another image
33 Albert Street, The Old Custom House, Including Boundary Walls And Railings				58°59′00″N 2°57′33″W	Category B	36779	Upload another image
41 Albert Street, Including Boundary Walls				58°58′52″N 2°57′40″W	Category C(S)	36781	Upload Photo
42 Albert Street				58°58′58″N 2°57′32″W	Category C(S)	36786	Upload Photo
1-9 (Odd Numbers) Cromwell Road				58°59′05″N 2°57′21″W	Category B	36794	Upload Photo
6 Watergate Street, The Old Manse, Including Boundary Walls And Railings				58°58′50″N 2°57′36″W	Category B	36683	Upload Photo
47-49 (Odd Numbers) Victoria Street				58°58′47″N 2°57′43″W	Category C(S)	36701	Upload Photo
60 Victoria Street				58°58′47″N 2°57′41″W	Category B	36703	Upload Photo
86 Victoria Street				58°58′44″N 2°57′41″W	Category B	36710	Upload another image
Building In Victoria Street Attached To Rear Of 8 Clay Loan				58°58′43″N 2°57′41″W	Category B	36716	Upload Photo
8 Clay Loan				58°58′43″N 2°57′41″W	Category B	36717	Upload another image
28, 28A And 28B Main Street				58°58′40″N 2°57′45″W	Category B	36728	Upload Photo
3 Wellington Street, Including Ancillary Building And Boundary Walls				58°58′41″N 2°57′50″W	Category C(S)	36730	Upload Photo
22 High Street				58°58′38″N 2°58′03″W	Category C(S)	36749	Upload Photo
24 High Street				58°58′38″N 2°58′03″W	Category C(S)	36750	Upload Photo
15 And 17 Bridge Street				58°59′03″N 2°57′30″W	Category B	36761	Upload another image
20-22 (Even Numbers) Bridge Street				58°59′03″N 2°57′28″W	Category B	36766	Upload Photo
54 Clay Loan, Including Boundary Walls And Railings				58°58′40″N 2°57′22″W	Category B	45984	Upload Photo
6 School Place				58°58′52″N 2°57′24″W	Category C(S)	46016	Upload Photo
Bridge Street, (Rear), Summerhouse				58°59′03″N 2°57′28″W	Category B	36793	Upload Photo
13 And 14 St Catherine's Place				58°59′04″N 2°57′22″W	Category B	36796	Upload Photo
20-26 (Even Numbers) East Road, Including Boundary Walls And Railings				58°59′04″N 2°57′11″W	Category C(S)	36803	Upload Photo
East Road, Eastbank House				58°59′04″N 2°56′56″W	Category C(S)	36805	Upload Photo
6 Broad Street, Orkney Tourist Board				58°58′55″N 2°57′35″W	Category B	36673	Upload another image
8 Broad Street				58°58′55″N 2°57′34″W	Category B	36674	Upload Photo
35-39 (Odd Numbers), And Number 41 Broad Street, The Orkney Museum, Including Garden Walls				58°58′53″N 2°57′40″W	Category A	36677	Upload another image
35 Victoria Street				58°58′49″N 2°57′42″W	Category C(S)	36694	Upload Photo
14 Main Street, The West End Hotel, Including Railings				58°58′41″N 2°57′42″W	Category B	36725	Upload Photo
18 And 20 Wellington Street				58°58′39″N 2°57′53″W	Category B	36735	Upload Photo
7 Bridge Street				58°59′04″N 2°57′31″W	Category B	36759	Upload Photo
1 School Place				58°58′54″N 2°57′28″W	Category C(S)	36773	Upload Photo
45 And 47 Albert Street				58°58′58″N 2°57′34″W	Category C(S)	45964	Upload Photo
8 Albert Street, Former Commercial Bank				58°59′01″N 2°57′28″W	Category B	45968	Upload Photo
Ayre Road, Grainbank House, Including Ancillary Range And Walled Garden				58°59′13″N 2°58′40″W	Category B	45972	Upload Photo
Berstane Road, Park Cottage				58°58′57″N 2°56′36″W	Category C(S)	45973	Upload Photo
Dundas Crescent, St Olaf's Church, (Episcopalian), Including Boundary Walls, Gatepiers And Railings				58°58′45″N 2°57′19″W	Category B	45986	Upload Photo
6 And 8 Dundas Crescent, Including Boundary Walls, Gatepiers And Railings				58°58′47″N 2°57′20″W	Category C(S)	45987	Upload Photo
1 Junction Road, The Orkney Wireless Museum				58°59′04″N 2°57′37″W	Category C(S)	46002	Upload another image
The Strynd, The Strynd Tea Rooms				58°58′56″N 2°57′34″W	Category B	46021	Upload Photo
52 And 54 Albert Street				58°58′57″N 2°57′34″W	Category C(S)	36788	Upload Photo
22 Shore Street, 'Tounigar'				58°59′06″N 2°57′27″W	Category B	36791	Upload Photo
25 And 26 St Catherine's Place, Including Ancillary Building				58°59′03″N 2°57′20″W	Category B	36801	Upload Photo
36 Broad Street, (Former Grammar School)				58°58′52″N 2°57′39″W	Category B	36680	Upload Photo
Palace Road, The Earl's Palace				58°58′50″N 2°57′32″W	Category A	36685	Upload another image
14 Victoria Street				58°58′51″N 2°57′40″W	Category B	36687	Upload Photo
19-23 (Odd Numbers) Victoria Street				58°58′50″N 2°57′41″W	Category B	36688	Upload Photo
27 Victoria Street				58°58′50″N 2°57′42″W	Category B	36690	Upload Photo
29 Victoria Street				58°58′49″N 2°57′43″W	Category B	36691	Upload Photo
54-56 Victoria Street				58°58′47″N 2°57′41″W	Category B	36702	Upload Photo
1 And 2 Spence's Square				58°58′45″N 2°57′41″W	Category B	36706	Upload Photo
24 Main Street				58°58′41″N 2°57′45″W	Category C(S)	36727	Upload Photo
25 Main Street				58°58′41″N 2°57′45″W	Category B	36729	Upload Photo
12 Wellington Street, Including Boundary Walls				58°58′40″N 2°57′52″W	Category B	36733	Upload Photo
Berstane Road, Vorsheed, Including Ancillary Structures, Boundary Walls And Gatepiers				58°58′52″N 2°56′25″W	Category C(S)	45974	Upload Photo
Broad Street, Town Hall				58°58′54″N 2°57′41″W	Category B	45980	Upload another image
Harbour Street, The Kirkwall Hotel				58°59′04″N 2°57′32″W	Category B	45997	Upload another image
Holm Road, The Highland Park Distillery				58°58′08″N 2°57′17″W	Category B	45998	Upload another image See more images
2 King Street, Including Boundary Walls And Gatepiers				58°58′58″N 2°57′25″W	Category B	46000	Upload Photo
1 Nicolson Street, Including Boundary Walls And Gatepiers				58°58′34″N 2°58′05″W	Category C(S)	46007	Upload Photo
11 School Place				58°58′51″N 2°57′25″W	Category C(S)	46017	Upload Photo
8 School Place				58°58′52″N 2°57′24″W	Category C(S)	46018	Upload Photo
12 School Place				58°58′52″N 2°57′23″W	Category C(S)	46020	Upload Photo
58 Victoria Street				58°58′47″N 2°57′41″W	Category C(S)	46027	Upload Photo
6 Old Scapa Road, Including Boundary Walls And Gatepiers				58°58′35″N 2°58′06″W	Category C(S)	45638	Upload Photo
20 Albert Street				58°59′00″N 2°57′30″W	Category B	36784	Upload Photo
59 Albert Street				58°58′57″N 2°57′35″W	Category C(S)	36789	Upload Photo
23 And 24 St Catherine's Place, Including Ancillary Building				58°59′04″N 2°57′20″W	Category B	36800	Upload Photo
18 East Road, Including Boundary Walls				58°59′04″N 2°57′14″W	Category B	36802	Upload Photo
Berstane Road, Papdale House				58°58′56″N 2°56′54″W	Category B	36807	Upload Photo
Broad Street, St Magnus Cathedral, (Cathedral Church Of St Magnus The Martyr), (Church Of Scotland), Including Boundary Walls, Railings, Graveyard And War Memorial				58°58′54″N 2°57′36″W	Category A	36668	Upload another image
32 Broad Street And 1 Palace Road				58°58′52″N 2°57′38″W	Category B	36679	Upload Photo
5 Walls Close, Including Boundary Walls				58°58′49″N 2°57′42″W	Category C(S)	36692	Upload Photo
33 Victoria Street				58°58′49″N 2°57′42″W	Category C(S)	36693	Upload Photo
37-39 (Odd Numbers) Victoria Street				58°58′49″N 2°57′42″W	Category B	36695	Upload Photo
61 Victoria Street And 2-8 (Even Numbers) Gunn's Close				58°58′47″N 2°57′42″W	Category B	36705	Upload Photo
83 Victoria Street				58°58′44″N 2°57′43″W	Category B	36712	Upload Photo
91 Victoria Street, Including Boundary Walls				58°58′44″N 2°57′42″W	Category B	36714	Upload Photo
10 Main Street				58°58′42″N 2°57′42″W	Category C(S)	36723	Upload Photo
14 Wellington Street				58°58′40″N 2°57′52″W	Category B	36734	Upload Photo
18 High Street				58°58′38″N 2°58′02″W	Category C(S)	36747	Upload Photo
13 Bridge Street, The Orcadian Offices				58°59′03″N 2°57′30″W	Category B	36760	Upload Photo
24 Bridge Street, Including Arch From St Olaf's Church				58°59′02″N 2°57′28″W	Category B	36767	Upload Photo
31 Albert Street				58°59′00″N 2°57′34″W	Category C(S)	36778	Upload Photo
9 And 11 Albert Street				58°59′02″N 2°57′30″W	Category C(S)	45963	Upload Photo
11 Bridge Street				58°59′04″N 2°57′30″W	Category C(S)	45978	Upload Photo
12 Clay Loan				58°58′43″N 2°57′41″W	Category B	45985	Upload Photo
East Road, Alton House, Including Boundary Walls				58°59′04″N 2°56′49″W	Category B	45988	Upload Photo
East Road, Lilybank House, Including Garage, Boundary Walls, Gatepiers And Railings				58°59′05″N 2°57′04″W	Category C(S)	45989	Upload Photo
Watergate, Sheriff Court And Police Station, Including Boundary Walls, Gatepiers And Railings				58°58′49″N 2°57′34″W	Category B	46010	Upload another image
Victoria Street, Kirkwall Baptist Church, Including Hall And Boundary Walls				58°58′44″N 2°57′41″W	Category C(S)	46022	Upload another image
School Place, Orkney Islands Council Offices, Formerly Kirkwall Grammar School, Including Boundary Walls				58°58′53″N 2°57′25″W	Category B	36809	Upload Photo
60 Albert Street And 2 Broad Street				58°58′56″N 2°57′35″W	Category B	36671	Upload another image
5 Broad Street, (Formerly Provost Riddoch's House), Including Boundary Walls, Gatepiers And Railings				58°58′55″N 2°57′38″W	Category B	36675	Upload Photo
76 And 78 Victoria Street				58°58′45″N 2°57′41″W	Category C(S)	36708	Upload Photo
3 Main Street				58°58′43″N 2°57′43″W	Category B	36720	Upload Photo
22 Main Street				58°58′41″N 2°57′44″W	Category C(S)	36726	Upload Photo
30 Wellington Street				58°58′39″N 2°57′55″W	Category B	36737	Upload Photo
34 Wellington Street				58°58′39″N 2°57′57″W	Category B	36739	Upload Photo
21 And 23 Bridge Street, Including Boundary Walls And Railings				58°59′03″N 2°57′30″W	Category B	36763	Upload Photo
10 King Street, Including Boundary Walls				58°58′56″N 2°57′26″W	Category B	36772	Upload Photo
6 Albert Street, Including Boundary Walls				58°59′01″N 2°57′27″W	Category C(S)	45967	Upload Photo
17 East Road, Including Boundary Walls And Railings				58°59′03″N 2°57′13″W	Category C(S)	45993	Upload Photo
23 Main Street				58°58′41″N 2°57′45″W	Category B	46005	Upload Photo
25 Victoria Street				58°58′50″N 2°57′42″W	Category B	46024	Upload Photo
17-21 (Odd Nos) Broad Street				58°58′55″N 2°57′39″W	Category C(S)	36676	Upload another image
41 Victoria Street				58°58′48″N 2°57′42″W	Category C(S)	36696	Upload Photo
51 Victoria Street				58°58′47″N 2°57′42″W	Category B	36700	Upload Photo
80 Victoria Street				58°58′44″N 2°57′41″W	Category C(S)	36709	Upload Photo
87 Victoria Street				58°58′44″N 2°57′42″W	Category B	36711	Upload Photo
10 Clay Loan				58°58′43″N 2°57′41″W	Category C(S)	36718	Upload Photo
5 Main Street				58°58′42″N 2°57′42″W	Category B	36721	Upload Photo
8 Main Street				58°58′42″N 2°57′42″W	Category C(S)	36722	Upload Photo
12 High Street				58°58′38″N 2°58′00″W	Category B	36744	Upload Photo
30 High Street, Including Boundary Walls				58°58′37″N 2°58′04″W	Category C(S)	36751	Upload Photo
6 Nicolson Street, Including Boundary Walls				58°58′34″N 2°58′03″W	Category B	36753	Upload Photo
22 Harbour Street, The Girnel House				58°59′04″N 2°57′36″W	Category B	36755	Upload Photo
26 Bridge Street				58°59′02″N 2°57′28″W	Category C(S)	36768	Upload Photo
8 St Olaf's Wynd				58°59′02″N 2°57′26″W	Category C(S)	36769	Upload Photo
9 Albert Square, (Off Mounthoolie Place), Including Boundary Walls And Railings				58°59′01″N 2°57′34″W	Category C(S)	36775	Upload Photo
34 Albert Street				58°58′59″N 2°57′32″W	Category B	45969	Upload Photo
56 Albert Street, Bank Of Scotland				58°58′57″N 2°57′34″W	Category B	45970	Upload Photo
Bignold Park Road, Mandras Villa, Including Boundary Walls And Piers				58°58′34″N 2°57′14″W	Category C(S)	45976	Upload Photo
St Magnus Cathedral Green, Drinking Fountain				58°58′53″N 2°57′38″W	Category C(S)	45979	Upload Photo
9 King Street, Including Ancillary Building, Boundary Walls, Gatepiers And Railings				58°58′56″N 2°57′29″W	Category B	45999	Upload Photo
10 Laing Street				58°58′58″N 2°57′26″W	Category C(S)	46004	Upload Photo
8 Old Scapa Road, Including Boundary Walls, Railings And Former Doocot				58°58′35″N 2°58′07″W	Category B	46009	Upload Photo
Queen Street And Bridge Street Wynd, Former Storehouse				58°59′00″N 2°57′25″W	Category B	46011	Upload Photo
1 Victoria Street, Royal Bank Of Scotland, Including Boundary Walls, Railings And Gatepiers				58°58′52″N 2°57′41″W	Category C(S)	46023	Upload Photo
59 Victoria Street				58°58′47″N 2°57′42″W	Category C(S)	46025	Upload Photo
66 Victoria Street				58°58′47″N 2°57′40″W	Category C(S)	46028	Upload Photo
66A And 66B Victoria Street				58°58′46″N 2°57′40″W	Category C(S)	46029	Upload Photo
10 Queen Street				58°59′00″N 2°57′22″W	Category C(S)	48570	Upload Photo

== Key ==
The scheme for classifying buildings in Scotland is:

- Category A: "buildings of national or international importance, either architectural or historic; or fine, little-altered examples of some particular period, style or building type."
- Category B: "buildings of regional or more than local importance; or major examples of some particular period, style or building type, which may have been altered."
- Category C: "buildings of local importance; lesser examples of any period, style, or building type, as originally constructed or moderately altered; and simple traditional buildings which group well with other listed buildings."

In March 2016 there were 47,288 listed buildings in Scotland. Of these, 8% were Category A, and 50% were Category B, with the remaining 42% being Category C.

== See also ==
- List of listed buildings in Orkney
