= Kirkwall Town Hall =

Municipal building in Kirkwall, Scotland

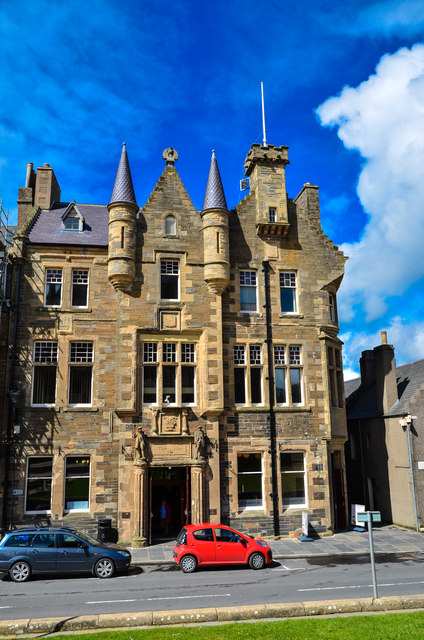
- Kirkwall Town Hall

- Shown in the Orkney Islands
- 58.9817°N 2.9608°W
- Location: Broad Street, Kirkwall

History
- Built: 1886

Site notes
- Architect: Thomas Smith Peace
- Architectural style: Scottish baronial style

Listed Building – Category B
- Official name: Broad Street, Town Hall
- Designated: 15 March 1999
- Reference no.: LB45980

Kirkwall Town Hall is a municipal building in Broad Street, Kirkwall, Orkney, Scotland. The structure, which is currently used as a community events venue, is a Category B listed building.

== History ==
The first municipal building in Kirkwall was the old town hall in the grounds of the St Magnus Cathedral which was erected with a grant from James Douglas, 14th Earl of Morton in 1745. The walls were built with stones from Kirkwall Castle and the roof was constructed with slate from the Bishop's Palace. The building accommodated the burgh council offices as well as the county offices and courtroom.

However, by the early 1880s, the building was very dilapidated, and the burgh council acquired a site on the west side of Broad Street which was occupied by the Commercial Hotel. The foundation stone for the new building was laid by Walter Erskine, 13th Earl of Kellie on 20 August 1884. It was designed by a local architect, Thomas Smith Peace, in the Scottish baronial style, built in coursed rubble masonry and was completed in 1886.

The design involved an asymmetrical main frontage of five bays facing onto Broad Street. The second bay on the left, which was slightly projected forward, featured a doorway in the form of an aedicula flanked by fluted columns supporting two statues and an entablature inscribed with the words "Town Hall" and the year, "1884". Above the entablature there was a coat of arms. There was a tri-partite window surmounted by a blank shield on the first floor, a single window on the second floor and a small round headed window in the stepped gable above. The bay was flanked by full-height pilasters supporting bartizans. The left-hand bay was fenestrated by bi-partite windows on the ground, first and second floors and by a dormer window at attic level, while the right-hand-bays were fenestrated by single windows on the ground floor, by bi-partite windows on the first floor and by single windows on the second floor; the right-hand bays were surmounted by a small corbeled and castellated tower. Internally, the principal room was the main assembly hall on the first floor: it featured a tri-partite stained glass window, made by Ballantine and Gardiner and depicting Henry Sinclair, Earl of Orkney, King James III and King Haakon IV of Norway.

The Scottish suffragist, Mary Anne Baikie, who established the Orcadian Women's Suffrage Society, chaired the meeting at which the formation of the society was proposed in the town hall on 25 October 1909. During the First World War, the Mission to Seafarers operated a rest centre and canteen there and, in May 1942, during the Second World War, the building hosted fund-raising events for Warship Week. The Leader of the Liberal Party, Sir Archibald Sinclair, spoke to a large audience in the town hall during the 1945 general election.

The building continued to serve as the meeting place of the burgh council for much of the 20th century but ceased to be the local seat of government when the Orkney Islands Council was formed at the council offices in School Place in 1975. The ground floor was subsequently converted for use as a café, while the assembly room on the first floor continued to be used as a community events venue.

In 1991, the public inquiry into the Orkney child abuse scandal was held under the chairmanship of Lord Clyde in the town hall: the inquiry found that the allegations were entirely false. The Duke and Duchess of Rothesay attended a reception in the town hall to meet owners of businesses supported by The Prince's Scottish Youth Business Trust in June 2009, and Crown Prince Haakon and Crown Princess Mette-Marit of Norway had lunch with council leaders in the town hall in June 2017.

Works of art in the town hall include two paintings by Stanley Cursiter, one of which depicts Queen Elizabeth II, accompanied by the Duke of Edinburgh, visiting St Magnus Cathedral on 12 August 1960, and the other one depicts a view of Kirkwall from the Peedie Sea.

== See also ==
- List of listed buildings in Kirkwall, Orkney
