= Bina Cursiter =

Scottish suffragist (1854-1934)

- Born: Jacobina Watt; Edinburgh, Scotland
- Baptised: 15 November 1854
- Died: 24 November 1934 (aged 80); Edinburgh, Scotland
- Resting place: Dean Cemetery
- Occupation: Suffragist
- Organization: Orcadian Women's Suffrage Society
- Relatives: Stanley Cursiter (nephew)

Bina Cursiter (15 November 1854 – 24 November 1934) was a Scottish suffragist, who played a leading role in Orcadian Women's Suffrage Society, and helped to galvanise the organised women's movement in Orkney.

== Life ==
Bina Cursiter was born Jacobina Watt in Edinburgh on 15 November 1854, the daughter of Philip Butler and Elizabeth Watt (née Patterson). She was educated in Surrey and Nottingham before being recommended, aged 18, to work as a governess in Hungary. Bina subsequently spent three years employed by Count Lajos Benyovszky, caring for his daughter Marietta.

The Watt family returned to Scotland in the 1880s, settling in Glasgow. In 1885, while visiting Kirkwall, Orkney, she met James Walls Cursiter, whom she married in Glasgow on 29 June 1892 at the age of 37. James Cursiter was a grocer and general merchant, as well as an archaeologist and antiquarian. The couple's daughter, Lizzie Watt, was born in 1893.

The meeting to form the Orcadian Women's Suffrage Society (OWSS) was held in the Cursiters' home in Kirkwall, Daisybank, on 25 September 1909. Bina Cursiter became its Honorary Secretary. Its President was Mary Anne Baikie. The OWSS, who by the end of their first year had 55 members, was non-militant, and Cursiter devoted much of her time to its methods - including writing to the press, staging debates, and speaking at meetings. At the group's 1913 AGM, Cursiter's 'arduous and self-sacrificing services in the Cause' were noted.

When Cursiter moved to Edinburgh in 1916, then aged 61, she was presented with a gold watch in appreciation of her service to the Orcadian Women's Suffrage Society. Once in Edinburgh, she became a member of the Scottish Women's Hospitals for Foreign Service, and supported the Elsie Inglis hospitals for women and children.

== Death and legacy ==
Bina Cursiter died in an Edinburgh nursing home aged 80, on 24 November 1934. She was buried in Dean Cemetery, Edinburgh.

In 2021, Bina Cursiter was featured on a pack of 'Scotland's Suffragette Trumps’ playing cards, which were sent to 100 Scottish schools by the group Protests and Suffragettes.
