= Kirkwall Sheriff Court =

Courthouse in Kirkwall, Scotland

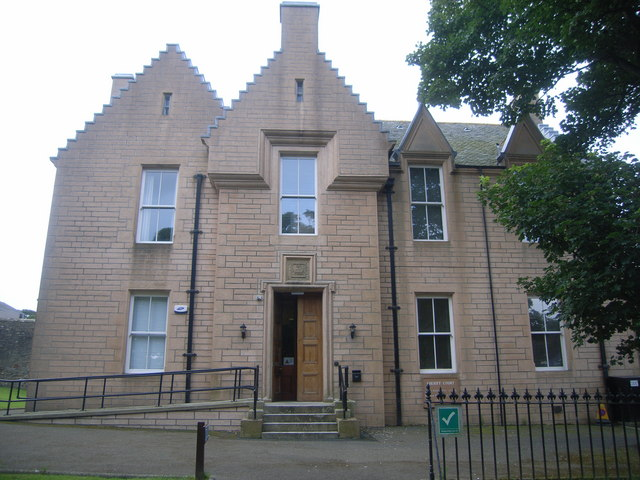
- Kirkwall Sheriff Court

- Shown in Orkney
- 58.9804°N 2.9595°W
- Location: Watergate, Kirkwall

History
- Built: 1877

Site notes
- Architect: David Bryce
- Architectural style: Scottish baronial style

Listed Building – Category C(S)
- Official name: Kirkwall Sheriff Court and Justice of the Peace Court and former Prison/Police Station, including boundary walls, gatepiers and railings, and excluding flat-roofed garage addition to south, Watergate, Kirkwall
- Designated: 15 March 1999
- Reference no.: LB46010

Kirkwall Sheriff Court is a judicial structure in Watergate, Kirkwall, Orkney, Scotland. The structure, which was the headquarters of Orkney County Council and is currently used as a courthouse, is a Category C listed building.

== History ==
The first judicial building in Kirkwall was the old town hall in the grounds of the St Magnus Cathedral which was erected with a grant from James Douglas, 14th Earl of Morton in 1745. The building accommodated the county offices and courtroom as well as the burgh council offices. However, by the early 1870s, the building was very dilapidated, and it was decided to establish a dedicated courthouse. The site the sheriff selected was in the grounds of the Earl's Palace.

The foundation stone for the new building was laid on 22 June 1876. It was designed by David Bryce in the Scottish baronial style, built in coursed sandstone at a cost of £3,900 and was officially opened on 27 August 1877. David Bryce died in 1876 and execution of the design was overseen by his nephew, John, who worked with him in later life.

The design involved an asymmetrical main frontage of four bays facing north towards Palace Road. The second bay on the left, which was slightly projected forward, featured a doorway with a moulded surround and a panel above; there was sash window on the first floor with a corbeled and crow stepped gable above. The outer bays were fenestrated with sash windows; the left hand bay was surmounted by a stepped gable while the first floor windows in the right hand bays were surmounted by gablets. The east and west gables contained tablets depicting the arms of Bishop Robert Reid and Bishop Edward Stewart. Internally, the principal room was the courtroom which featured the royal arms of Scotland carved in wood and mounted on a navy blue oblong panel.

Following the implementation of the Local Government (Scotland) Act 1889, which established county councils in every county, the new county leaders needed to identify offices for Orkney County Council. The new county council established its offices in the building which became known as "County Buildings". After the abolition of Orkney County Council in 1975, the building was used solely for judicial purposes. (Note: The new Orkney Islands Council established offices in the old Kirkwall Grammar School in School Lane in 1980.) The building continues to serve as the venue for sheriff court hearings in the area, although, due to staffing issues with the escort services, hearings involving juries were moved to the mainland in July 2023.

== See also ==
- List of listed buildings in Kirkwall, Orkney
