= Mary McNeill (doctor) =

Scottish suffragist and Orcadian doctor (1874–1928)

Mary Lauchline McNeill MB ChB
- Born: 27 September 1874; Orkney
- Died: 10 June 1928 (aged 53); Jinja, Uganda
- Education: University of Glasgow
- Organization: Scottish Women's Hospitals for Foreign Service
- Known for: Suffragist, Doctor of medicine
- Awards: French medal Médaille des Épidémies (en vermeil) and the Serbian Order of St Sava

Mary Lauchline McNeill (27 September 1874 – 10 June 1928) was an Orcadian suffragist and doctor. She served with the Scottish Women's Hospitals in the First World War, and was awarded medals from Britain, France and Serbia, then worked in medicine in Palestine, India and Uganda, where she died of typhoid.

== Family and education ==
McNeill was born in Orkney on 27 September 1874. Her parents were Jessie Janet Dewar and the Reverend Daniel McNeill, a minister of the Free Kirk in Orkney. Dewar was originally from Fochabers, and Rev. McNeill was from Argyll, and was minister of Holm, Orkney for nearly fifty years. Mary was the second oldest of twelve children. A sister was F. Marian McNeill, author of The Silver Bough.

She graduated in medicine from Glasgow University in 1905. A brother David also became a doctor. Before returning to Orkney to work as a general practitioner, McNeill worked as an assistant doctor in London.

The first mention of her in the press was in 1908, when one of the local newspapers highlighted her organ playing. McNeill was also a singer and a harmonium player in the Holm United Free Church; The Orkney Herald described McNeill as an "accomplished musician."

According to the newsletter of the Orkney Family History Society, McNeill was also talented at learning foreign languages, and in literature and art.

== Role in women's suffrage ==
McNeill was one of those present in 1909 when the formation of an Orcadian Women's Suffrage Society was proposed.

In The Orcadian newspaper in January 1910, her speech to the local suffrage society is quoted at length; its title was "Co-operation". In the course of it, McNeill cited the differences between oriental and western civilisations' views on women. She also looked at countries such as Finland and Norway where women had already gained the franchise. McNeill also read out a resolution passed by the Wyoming House of Representatives, which acknowledged the many positive contributions women had made since being enfranchised in that American state.

In June 1910, McNeill chaired a meeting of the Orcadian Women's Suffrage Society where Wilhelmina Lamond (later Abbott) was the guest speaker. In February 1911, she again read a paper at the Society along with its chair, Mary Anne Baikie and Miss Flett. “A pageant of great women” was the title. Starting with the Biblical figure of Deborah, she proceeded to talk about women in modern times, concluding that if the “worst evils of our time” are to be overcome, then the “heart, the instinct and the intellect of women must be felt in the councils of the nations.”

McNeill often led the discussions at the meetings of the Orcadian Women's Suffrage Society; its discussions were not confined to suffrage issues, but also encompassed parity of pay between men and women as well as social reform.

== Medical service ==
In 1912, McNeill was one of the local medical practitioners called to give evidence to a public committee, the membership of which included Sir John Dewar MP and the Marchioness of Tullibardine, which had been convened to look into the medical services in Orkney.

In 1914, McNeill moved to Leicester to take over the medical practice of her brother David, in order for him to join the Royal Army Medical Corps. She remained there, working for part of the time in the Fever Hospital, until 1916 when she joined the Scottish Women's Hospitals for Foreign Service.

Her manuscript diaries, which are in the possession of the Imperial War Museum, note that her service was in Ostrovo and Salonika, where she met Prince Alexander of Serbia, President Venizelos, Flora Sandes and King Constantine of Greece. McNeill worked there from October 1916 until May 1919, when she was transferred to Belgrade.

For her service in the Balkans, McNeill was awarded the French medal Médaille des Épidémies (en vermeil) and the Serbian Order of St Sava. Elsie Inglis, founder of the Scottish Women's Hospitals, also received this medal. McNeill was also awarded the British War and Victory Medals.

McNeill continued working in medicine abroad after the end of the First World War; firstly, in the Scottish Mission Hospital in Tiberias in what was then Palestine, then in India and finally Uganda, where she was the first doctor at the hospital outpost in Kamuli, Busogaland, established by the Little Sisters of St Francis in 1914. During this period, she also travelled in Europe with her sister Margaret, and the pair had a private audience with Pope Pius XI in 1925, and shortly after converted to Catholicism.

On 10 June 1928, McNeill died of typhoid fever at a remote mission station in Uganda.. Her obituary in the British Medical Journal summarised her life and career, and included a tribute from a former colleague "Those who knew Dr Mary McNeil loved her for her upright character, her upright life, her devotion to her family and her loyalty as a colleague."

== Legacy ==
MacNeill featured in the award-winning animation produced about the Orcadian suffragists A Gude Cause Maks A Strong Erm.
