= Mary Anne Baikie =

Scottish suffragist (1861–1950)

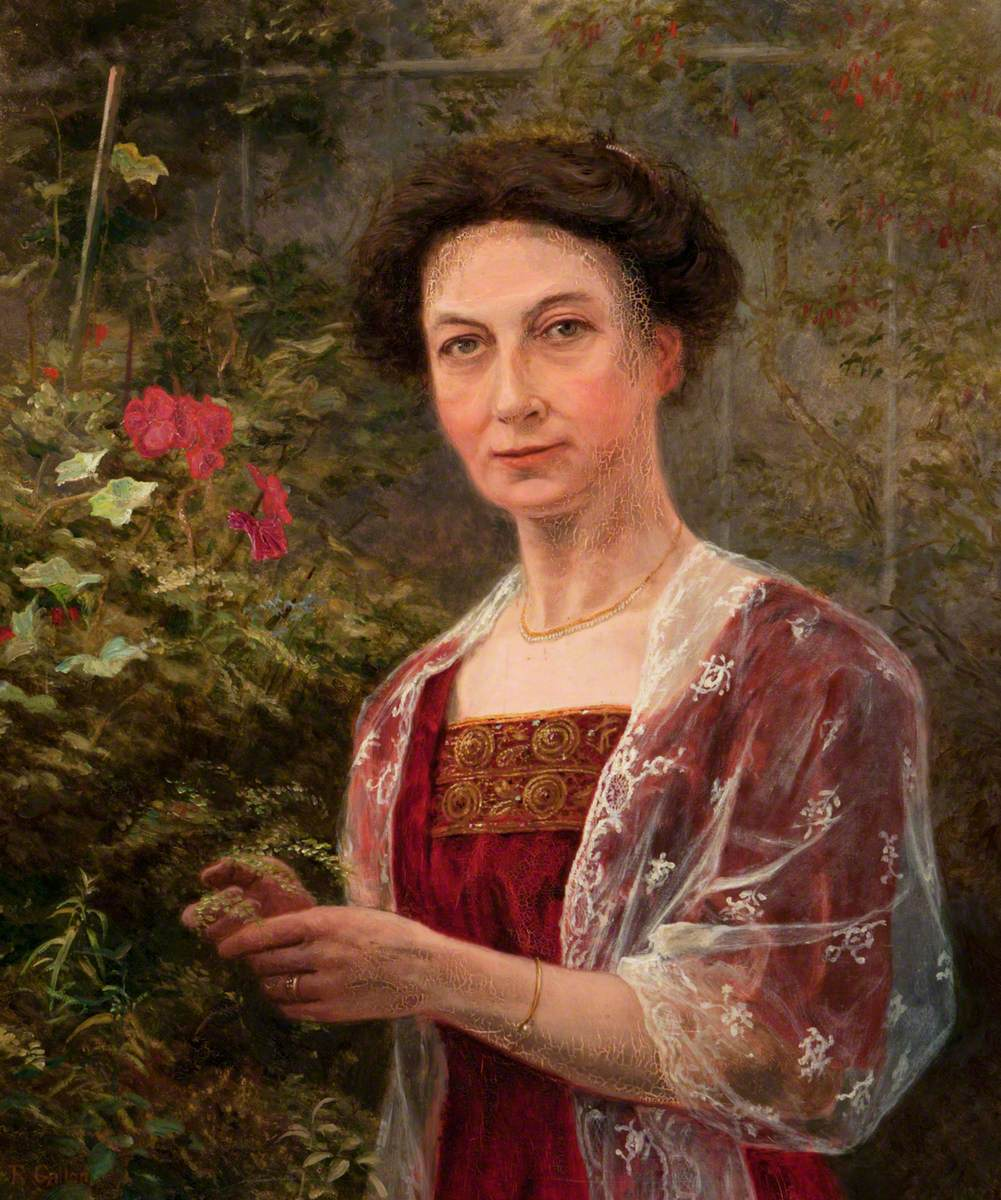
- Portrait (1911) by Robert Gallon, now in The Orkney Museum
- Born: 29 June 1861; Kirkwall, Orkney, Scotland
- Died: 16 October 1950 (aged 89); Kirkwall, Orkney, Scotland
- Organization: Orcadian Women's Suffrage Society
- Known for: Suffrage leadership and oratory
- Movement: Suffragist
- Spouse: Provost Alfred Baikie (married 1902–1947)

Mary Anne Baikie (née Traill, 29 June 1861 – 16 October 1950) a Scottish suffragist who established the Orcadian Women's Suffrage Society (OWSS) and grew the membership and public interest in the debate, in the Orkney Isles, during the campaigns for Votes for Women.

== Early life ==
Mary Anne 'Milanne' Traill was the youngest daughter of Thomas Traill of Holland House, Papa Westray. In 1902 in Edinburgh, she married Alfred Baikie of Tankerness.

== Suffragist leadership ==
Baikie chaired the first official public meeting in Orkney to form a society for women's suffrage, on 25 October 1909. This followed a preliminary meeting at the home of James and Bina Cursiter, when Chrystal Macmillan, the suffragist champion of women's rights to a university education, had visited Orkney, a month before.

Baikie spoke at the launch in Kirkwall Town Hall, saying:

I do not come as a political woman, but I have come as a friend of the cause of women, because of my sincere conviction, held since my early youth, that the suffrage will raise the status, and improve the condition of all women – particularly the women workers.

She proceeded to argue that from Magna Carta and the British constitution women were not precluded from voting, but that legal reforms in 1832 deprived women of these rights. Baikie referred to thirty debates in Parliament from private members' bills to pledges from election candidates, none of which had prevailed. Her logic was that this outcome was because women did not have the vote, therefore any political promises could be made then broken with impunity. Baikie suggested that the "Orcadian's high intelligence will recognise the justice of the claim of women for political recognition, and will heartily support the cause". She also refuted the key points put by anti-suffragists about women's "inability" to fight, and that their suffrage would change men's attitude to women. Baikie felt it had taken courage for her to speak in public and bravery (and risk of alienation) if supporting the more militant suffragettes. Not all present agreed on this point but the meeting heard that New Zealand women already had the vote. Mr Cursiter commended Baikie's speech as the best he had ever heard on this topic.

The Orcadian Women's Suffrage Society's membership grew significantly. By March 1910, one hundred and sixteen signatures were collected in favour of women's suffrage, including 50% of the town councillors, and sent to the MP for Wick Burghs constituency (which included Kirkwall (Burgh)). In 1911, the Stromness WSPU branch merged with OWSS.

== Link to national suffrage movement ==
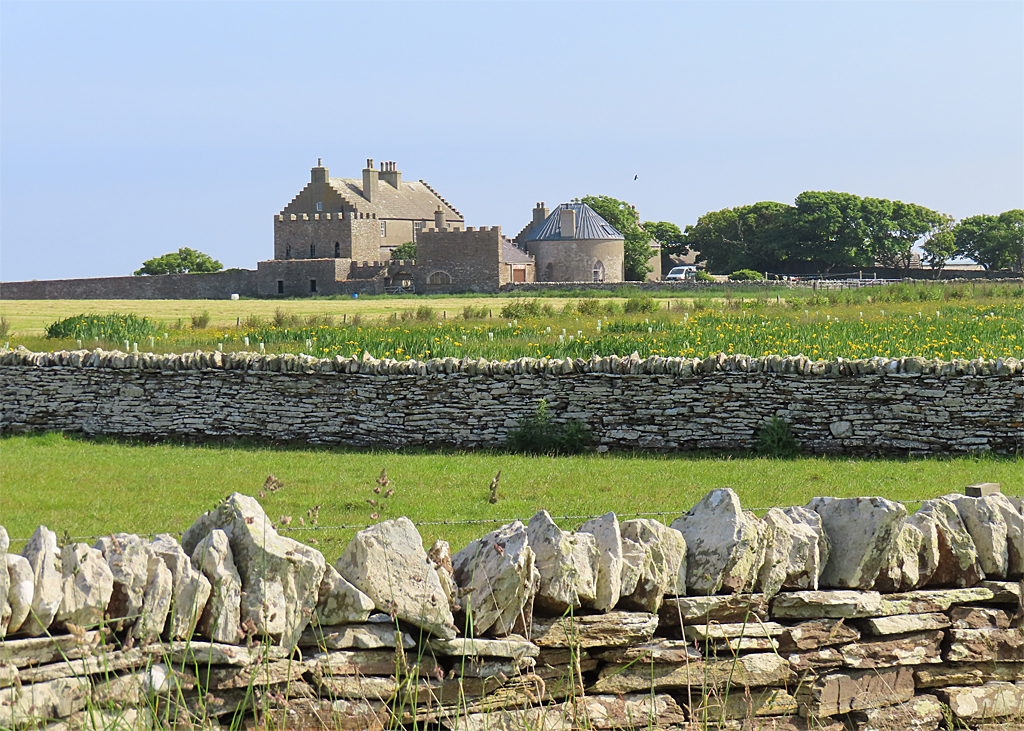
The Hall of Tankerness, the Baikie family home

Under Baikie's chairmanship, the society could host a debate for both sides of the argument without acrimony. By June 1910, Baikie was also developing a local Tankerness group, and an onerous 10-day tour by Wilhemina Hay Lamond (later known as Elizabeth Abbott) from the Edinburgh National Society for Women's Suffrage, with meetings with fishermen at the pier, and in drawing-room groups, in Holm, Westray, Stronsay, Sanday (and North Ronaldsay), Kirkwall, Shapinsay, Rousay, Deerness, and Stromness); Lamond also aimed to visit remote Fair Isle.

In December 1911, Baikie convened another public meeting (including a social soirée) where she explained the Conciliation Bill and suffragist position, reported as "a brilliant speech, characterised by a sweet spirit of reasonableness, which was as convincing as it was enjoyable."

Orcadian members grew eventually to 100 by 1916, and in 1912, there were already 60 members on four of the Orkney islands, holding regular public meetings and having keynote visits from leading speakers. A visit was arranged for Elsie Inglis from the Edinburgh leadership on 24 April 1912, when she described the Orkney society as having "the most enthusiastic officers". A special "Orcadian Banner" designed by local artist, Stanley Cursiter and Shetlander Christina Jamieson was carried at the Women's Coronation Procession in London by Baikie's niece, Miss Courtenay, with the other representative groups of the National Union of Women's Suffrage Societies. The Orkney group was the only Scottish group who also contributed to the Women's March from Edinburgh to London.

In November 1912, local paper The Orcadian dedicated a large section of its news to Baikie's explanation, at a crowded meeting in the Albert Temperance Hotel, Kirkwall, of the various Parliamentary mechanics of the draft Reform Bill (an Act to extend the male electorate but not to include women). Baikie characterised this as coming from anti-suffragists in the Cabinet, who saw danger in giving "unstable women" the vote, but are enfranchising "every irresponsible boy of 21". She explained amendment proposals (being debated) e.g. to simply delete the word "male" from the Clause 1(1) "every male person" to achieve equal franchise for women, by MPs Grey, Lyttleton, Runciman, Cecil, Dickinson, Henderson and Snowden. And the Labour Party amendment which was also to add after the word "person" the phrase "of either sex". Baikie's speech also outlined the various options on age, and property and the differences this would make to the eligible women voters in England, compared to Scotland & Ireland, who had different positions regarding women's property ownership. Her conclusion was this Act would be unlikely to calm the anger among women who had campaigned for so many years.

Baikie went on to say: "Sex antagonism and bitterness won't win our cause for us, and we will win it"; and "in the name of common sense it is time to put an end to this unfair and unseemly struggle in a country world famous for its justice." Other speakers mentioned the Scandinavian "blood" of Orcadians as Denmark or Norway, women already had the vote, and could soon stand for public office on the same conditions as men. Convinced of the case, the meeting unanimously endorsed Baikie's proposal that women's suffrage should be included in the Act.

In 1914, the Orcadian group asked the Kirkwall Burgh council to send a senior representative to the National Suffrage Societies event at the Albert Hall, London as other Scottish cities were sending their Lord Provost and office bearers to meet the Prime Minister, H. H. Asquith.

== Legacy ==
In 1911, Robert Gallon painted an oil portrait of Baikie entitled Mary Anne Baikie (Milanne), née Traill. The portrait hangs in The Orkney Museum, which is in Kirkwall's Tankerness House, the former home of the Baikies of Tankerness. Gallon also painted her daughter, Margaret Traill Baikie, on a pony at the Hall of Tankerness; this too is in The Orkney Museum.

In 2018, to mark International Women's Day and the centenary of (some) women's right to vote, the Northlight Gallery in Stromness presented an animated short film called A Gude Cause Maks a Strong Erm. The film was written by Orkney-based journalist Fiona Grahame, painted and animated by Martin Laird, with a musical score by James Watson and narration by Kim Foden. The film had an advertising poster in the form of a Cubist-style graphic abstract of Baikie's portrait, painted by Laird. After touring film festivals it won the Most Creative/Original award at the Scottish Short Film Festival in Glasgow.

== See also ==
- Feminism in the United Kingdom
- List of suffragists and suffragettes
- List of women's rights activists
- List of women's rights organizations
- Timeline of women's suffrage
- Women's suffrage organizations
- 'A Gude Cause Maks a Strong Erm' animated short film
