= Orkney Wireless Museum =

Museum in Orkney, Scotland

Coordinates: 58°59′4″N 2°57′37″W

The Orkney Wireless Museum in Kirkwall, Orkney, Scotland, houses a collection of domestic and military wireless equipment. It developed from the private collection of the late Jim MacDonald from St Margaret's Hope and marks the importance of wireless communications in Orkney during World War II.

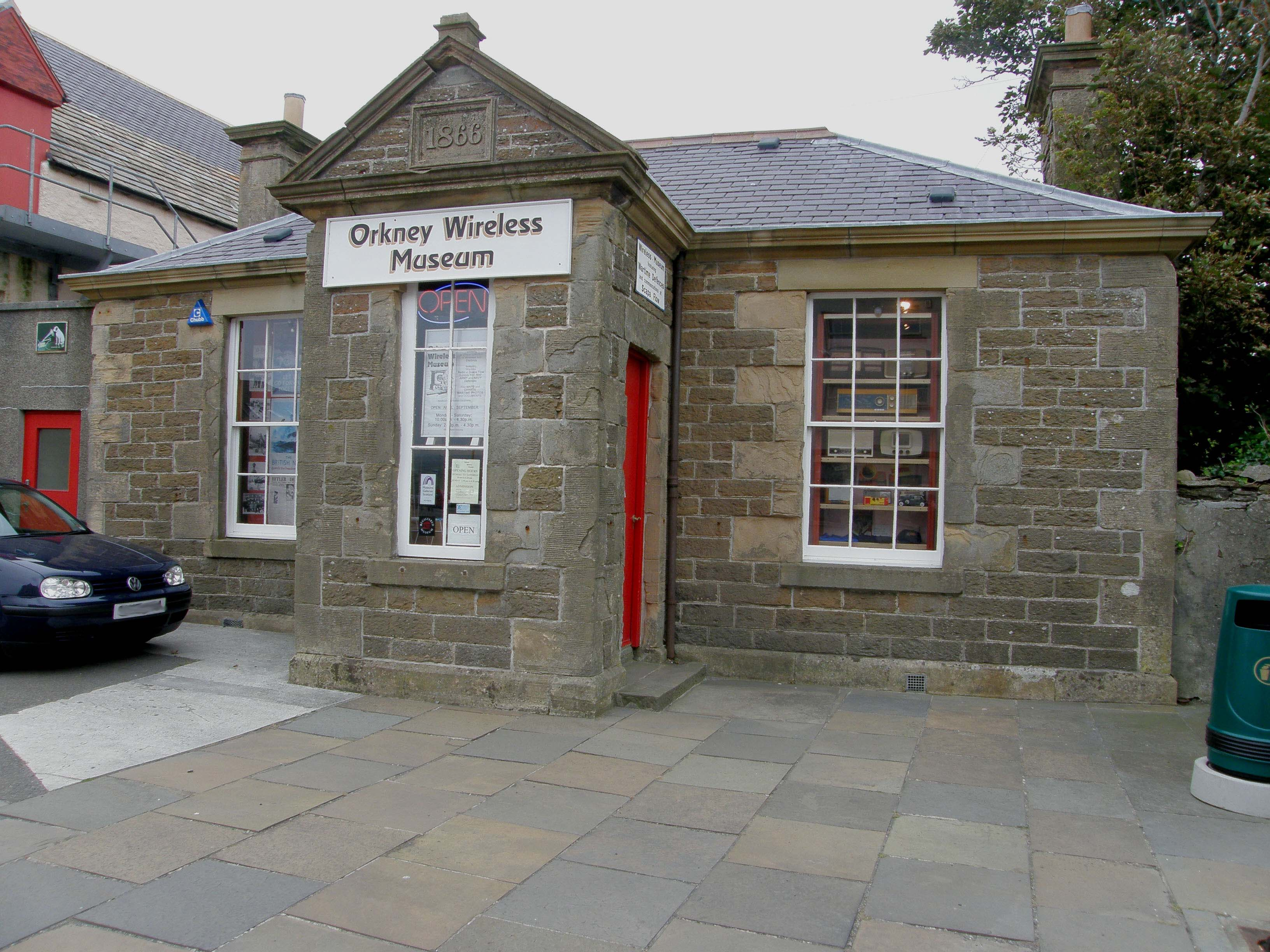
Orkney Wireless Museum

== Museum ==
The Orkney Wireless Museum is located at Kiln Corner, Kirkwall in Orkney and is run on an entirely voluntary basis. It is registered as a Charitable Company. The Friends of the museum, from all over the world, help raise funds for the museum. The local branch of the society organises volunteers to man the Museum every day of the season, from April to September.

The displays and photographic archive bear testament to the strategic and military importance of Orkney during World War II. In the collection there is much reference to the Home Fleet in Scapa Flow, Orkney. The museum demonstrates the importance of wireless communications and radar to the civilian and military populations.

The Amateur Radio call sign GB2OWM is frequently activated at the museum. During the Orkney Science Festival every September, worldwide contacts are made and QSL cards are subsequently exchanged with the stations contacted.

== Exhibits ==
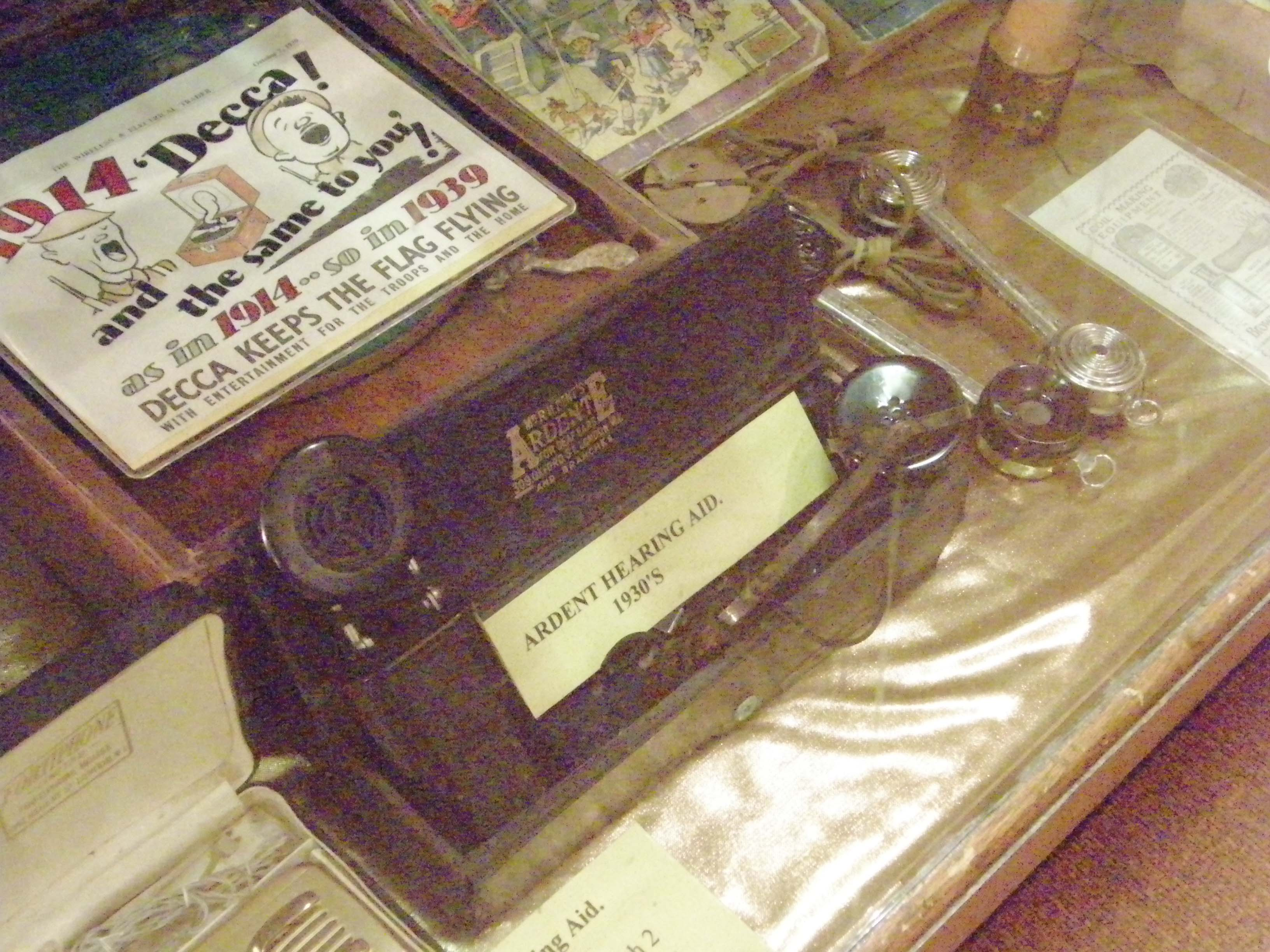
Ardent hearing aid

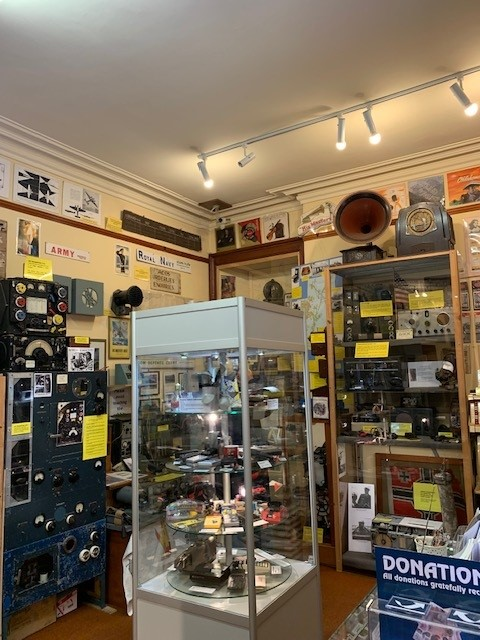
Orkney Wireless Museum interior

The museum has an extensive collection of early domestic radio and wartime communications equipment. Most of the equipment was built in the UK and US. The museum also houses early advertising and posters. An archive of photographs depicts wartime forces and includes coverage of the building of the Churchill Barriers which were built primarily as naval defences to protect the anchorage at Scapa Flow.

Some examples of exhibits:

- No. 19 Tank Set
- early recording equipment e.g. The Recordon dictating machine made by Thermionic Products Ltd of England – features a flat, magnetically coated paper disk.
- example of 1930s Ardent hearing aid
- a working crystal set (made about 1912) with the crystal/cat's whisker detector clearly visible. Visitors may put the headphones on and listen to BBC Radio Scotland.
- original Scapa Flow boom defence chart
- U-boat radio
- spy Suitcase Radio
- radios used as Y-stations by Y-service operators
- photographic archive of life in "Fortress Orkney"
- domestic wireless receivers made in the US by companies such as Emerson Radio, Weston, Philco
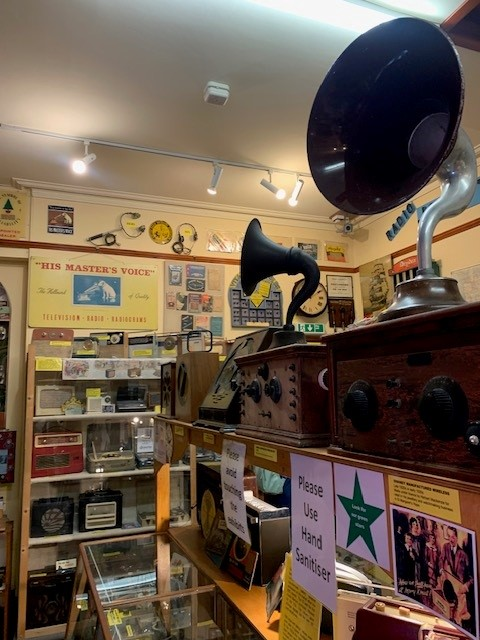
- Orkney Wireless Museum collections
  wireless receivers made in the UK by companies such as EKCO.

== Museum history ==
Jim MacDonald had a love of wireless sets and gathered an extensive and varied collection of domestic and military wireless equipment. The Museum was founded in 1983 when he was persuaded to display his collection in what he called "An Orkney Wireless Museum" in the family home in St Margaret's Hope, South Ronaldsay. After he died of cancer in 1988, his family carried out his wishes to develop the museum.

In June 1990 a registered family Trust was set up to run the museum. In 1994, the Museum was admitted as a member of the Museums and Galleries Commission of Great Britain. The Museum was awarded a Certificate from the Royal Naval Amateur Radio Society "For work in collecting, preserving and displaying the radio and electronic heritage of Scapa Flow and the Orkney Isles"

In 1997, the collection moved to Kiln Corner, Kirkwall which allowed a greater number of exhibits to be displayed. The Museum has received many financial donations.

== Founder ==
James "Jim" MacDonald (1927–1988) was born and brought up on South Ronaldsay. He was locally educated and served his apprenticeship as an electrician and radio repairman. During his boyhood, wireless was rapidly developing and he started to gather old, interesting sets which were becoming redundant. This became the nucleus for his collection which includes such rare and interesting examples as "Kit Sets" and the very, very expensive models by such famous names as Marconi, Cossor, MacMichael, K.B., Lowe and Amplion.

With the outbreak of war in 1939, he was listed as in a reserved occupation, and worked for the War Office as a civilian in the great Naval Base at Lyness. He was also employed at other RAF sites such as Netherbutton, with one of the world's first active operational radar installations. (This was actually the prototype, modified, which was shipped from England, as the one being built for Orkney was not nearly ready. When Orkney's was finished, it was sent to Dover where it was to play such a vital role in the Battle of Britain).

After the war, Jim collected as many examples of relevant equipment as he could; many operations were still classified as Top Secret. Another problem to collection was that equipment was deliberately destroyed in order to prevent flooding the market with surplus goods (as had happened after the First World War). The collected equipment had played a vital part in the Battle of the Atlantic and North Sea, and has all seen active service.
