= Orkney International Science Festival =

Scottish science festival

- Genre: Science festival
- Frequency: Annual
- Locations: Kirkwall, Orkney Islands, Scotland
- Inaugurated: 1991

The Orkney International Science Festival is a science festival which takes place every September in Kirkwall, Orkney Islands, Scotland and has been running since 1991.

== History ==
The first Orkney International Science Festival took place in 1991, the world's second science festival. It takes place in September each year, generally at Kirkwall.

=== 2013 Festival ===
The 2014 Orkney International Science Festival was opened by documentary film-maker Alan Ereira, and featured over 50 events on topics of astronomy, archaeology, the Arctic, the science of a lost city, Vikings, the search for a lost undersea world, ancient catastrophes on Earth, and supermassive black holes. Speakers included astronomer and author Prof. Bill Napier of Buckingham University, Prof. Bonnie A. Steves of Glasgow Caledonian University, and archaeologist Dr. Cathy Batt from Bradford University.

=== 2014 Festival ===
The 2014 festival was opened by the former chief scientist of the Discovery Channel, Professor Steve ‘Jake’ Jacobs. Topics of the festival ranged from the origin of life in space, to clues from genetics to the people of the Viking Age.

=== 2015 Festival ===
2015 marks the 25th festival. In 2015, the "International Year of Light" will be a theme of the festival, featuring a conversation with Nobel Prizewinner Peter Higgs, and with highlights including the Higgs boson, Einstein's universe, Maxwell's waves, exploring Mars and Venus, our changing weather, and cracking the cancer code.

=== 2017 Festival ===
The 2017 festival took place in Ophir church, opened by Christopher Somerville, a travel writer.

=== 2018 Festival ===
The 28th festival included Paul Nurse and Peter Higgs as key speakers. It covered hydrogen fuel technology for transport, the Shackleton–Rowett Expedition of Antarctic's seas and topics such as particle physics and black holes.
