= Northern Burghs =

Northern Burghs may refer to:

- Tain Burghs (UK Parliament constituency), a constituency of the Parliament of Great Britain 1708–1801 and of the Parliament of the United Kingdom 1801–1832
- Wick Burghs (UK Parliament constituency), a constituency of the Parliament of the United Kingdom 1832–1918
