= Stanley Cursiter =

- Born: 29 April 1887; Kirkwall, Orkney, Scotland
- Died: 22 April 1976 (aged 88); Stromness, Orkney, Scotland
- Education: Edinburgh College of Art
- Known for: Painting, Drawing, author
- Movement: Futurism
- Spouse: Phyllis Hourston
- Relatives: Bina Cursiter (aunt)

The Regatta, 1913, National Gallery of Scotland.

Stanley Cursiter CBE FRSE FRIAS FEIS RSA RSW (29 April 1887 – 22 April 1976) was an Orcadian artist who played an important role in introducing Post-Impressionism and Futurism to Scotland. He served as the keeper (1919–1930), then director (1930–1948), of the National Galleries of Scotland, and as HM Limner and Painter in Scotland (1948–1976).

== Biography ==
He was born on 29 April 1887 at 15 East Road in Kirkwall, Orkney, the son of John Scott Cursiter and Mary Joan Thomson.

He was educated at Kirkwall Grammar School before moving to Edinburgh, where he studied at Edinburgh College of Art. His early paintings were influenced by cubism, futurism and vorticism. From an early age, he clearly had access to great wealth as his accommodation from 1910 is listed as 28 Queen Street, one of the most prestigious addresses in Edinburgh, and not affordable to the average art student.

A banner he designed for the Orcadian Women's Suffrage Society was carried at the Coronation Procession in 1911, and his family in Orkney were keen supporters of the cause for women's rights and local convenor Margaret Baikie, whose portrait he painted in 1946.

During First World War he served as an officer in 1st Battalion, the Cameronians and served in The Battle of the Somme, Amiens and Abbeville. The conditions in the trenches brought on bronchitis and asthma, and he was invalided out to convalesce in the South of France. After recuperating, he returned to the Battalion's base, but was once again hospitalised and in danger of becoming 'unfit for service'. However he managed to continue service by transferring to the 4th Field Ordnance Survey Battalion at 4th Army Headquarters and developed new and faster methods for processing aerial photographs. In particular, he devised a clever method of projecting the photographic negative taken from a spotter plane which replicated the tilt present when the photograph was taken – the technique of single photo-optical rectification. This greatly speeded up the process of rapid fixing of enemy gun emplacements. During the War, he also learned to use radio (becoming President of the Edinburgh Radio Society). He was Mentioned in Dispatches twice and received a military OBE. During the Second World War he initially worked at the Ordnance Survey Department in Southampton (1939–40) and then moved to the same organisation in Edinburgh (1940–1945). He received a military CBE in 1948.

After the First World War he adopted a more realist style.

Cursiter became an Associate of the Royal Scottish Academy in 1927, a full Academician in 1937 and served as Secretary to the academy from 1953 to 1955. He was the first Secretary of the Royal Fine Art Commission for Scotland and was appointed Keeper of the National Galleries of Scotland in 1930, a post he held until 1948. That same year, he was granted the Freedom of Kirkwall and was appointed as the King's (later to be Queen's) Painter and Limner for Scotland, a position he held until his death.

He painted watercolour landscapes of East Lothian, Orkney and Shetland, and designed Saint Rognvald Chapel in St Magnus Cathedral in Kirkwall. He is particularly renowned for his portraits and is considered amongst the finest Scottish portraitists of the 20th Century. He painted 'Her Majesty The Queen receiving the Honours of Scotland' in the High Kirk of St Giles in 1953, this painting hangs on the Great Stair, Palace of Holyroodhouse, Edinburgh.

Aberdeen University awarded him an honorary doctorate (LLD) in 1959. He was elected a Fellow of the Royal Society of Edinburgh in 1938, a rare accolade for an artist. His proposers were James Pickering Kendall, Leonard Dobbin, James Watt, and Sir Ernest Wedderburn.

Cursiter was influential in the campaign to create a Scottish National Gallery of Modern Art.

He died in Stromness on 22 April 1976.

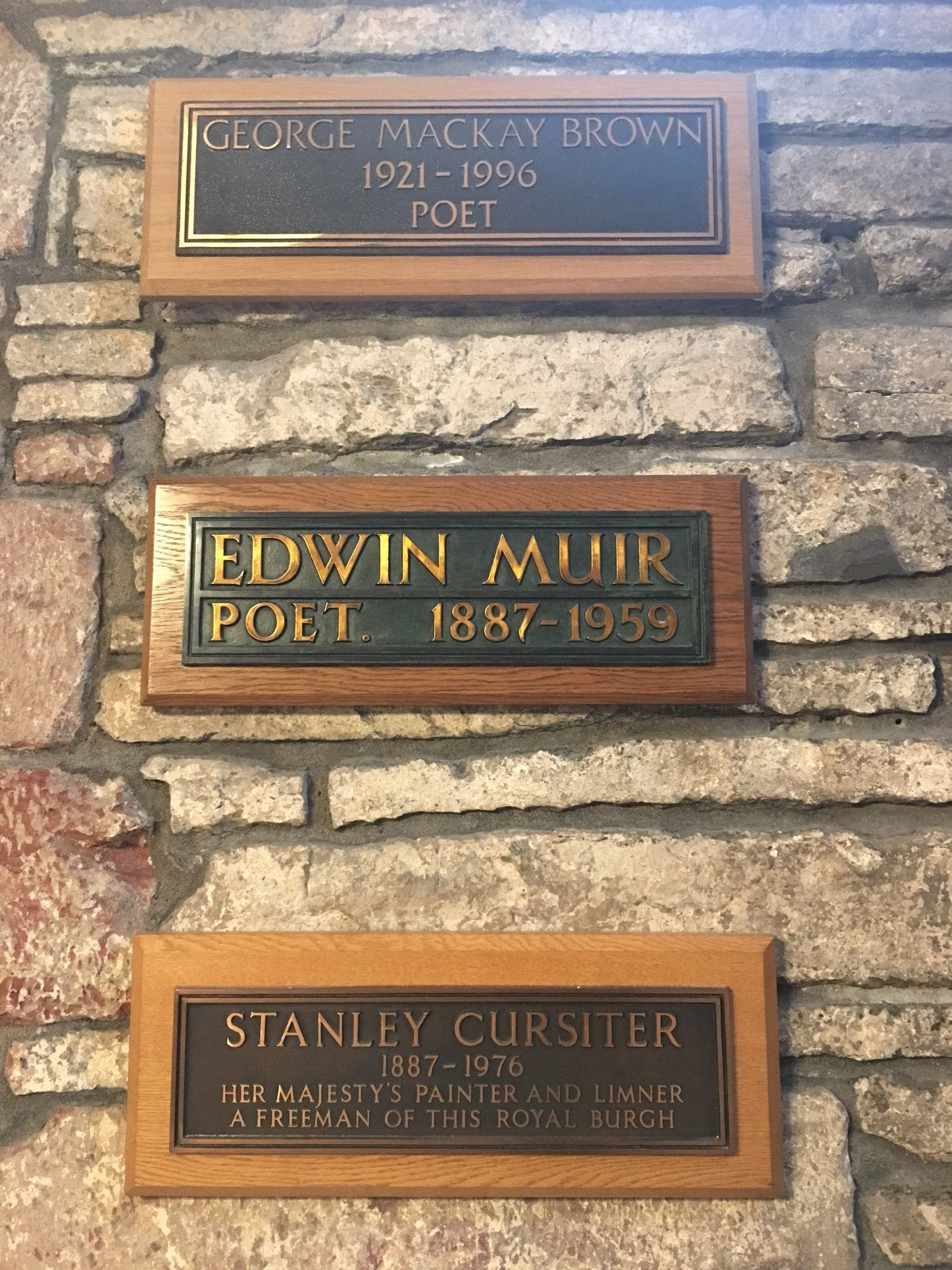
Memorial to Stanley Cursiter in Kirkwall Cathedral, Orkney

Landscape in the Orkneys, 1954.

== Family ==
He married Phylliss Hourston on 14 October 1916.

His older sister Jessie Cursiter (1881–1916) is buried in Dean Cemetery in Edinburgh.

== Selected works ==
- Rain on Princes Street, 1913
- The Regatta, 1913
- Villefranche, circa 1920
- The Fair Isle Jumper, 1923
- Geo at Yesnaby and Brough of Bigging, 1929
- Window – Burnstane House, circa 1935
- The Old Store, Stromness, 1950
- The Honours of Scotland, 1954
- Landscape in the Orkney Islands, 1954
