= Orcadian Women's Suffrage Society =

Women's suffrage organisation in Scotland

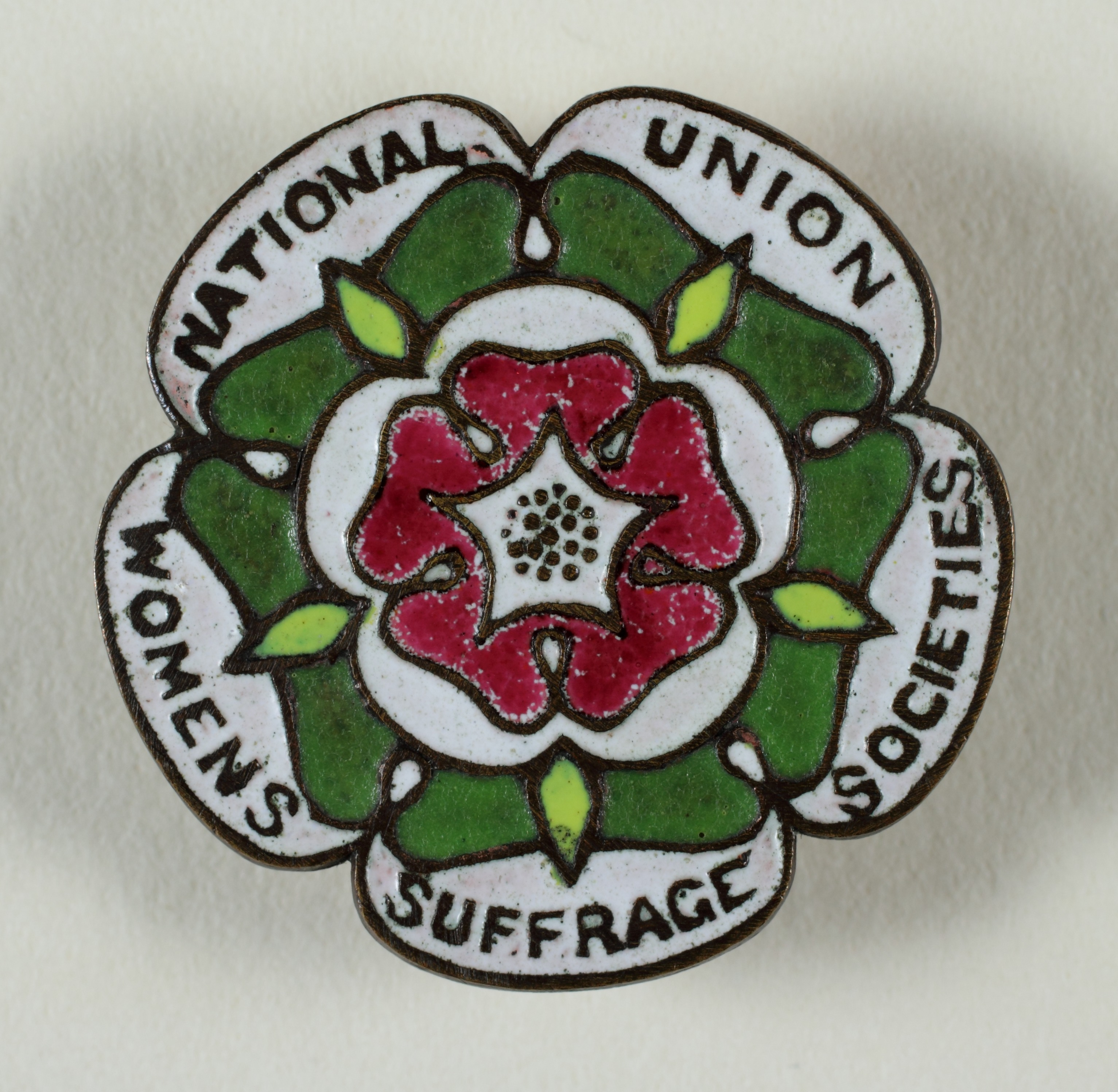
Badge of the National Union of Women's Suffrage Societies, 1908-1918

The Orcadian Women's Suffrage Association was an organisation involved in campaigning for women’s suffrage, based in Orkney, Scotland.

== Formation ==
The first meeting of the society was held in the house of James and Bina Cursiter on September 25, 1909. It was formed a month after a visit to Orkney by Chrystal Macmillan, by the chair Mary Anne Baikie of Tankerness, who led the group to expand rapidly and to bring together men and women, to debate the political developments and to host leaders from national groups.

== Activities ==
The organisation was affiliated to the National Union of Women's Suffrage Societies. As such, their activities mirrored those of many other suffragist groups. They conveyed their message by addressing public meetings, distributing leaflets, and writing to the local press to promote the cause of women's suffrage.

In 1911, a banner, created by Stanley Cursiter and Christina Jamieson, of the Shetland Women's Suffrage Society, was taken to London for the Suffrage Coronation Procession.

== Links to Scottish Women's Hospitals ==
In 1912, Dr Elsie Inglis spoke at a meeting of the OWSS in her capacity as Honorary Secretary of the Scottish Federation of Women's Suffrage Societies. After the outbreak of the First World War and the foundation of the Scottish Women's Hospitals for Foreign Service in 1914, the women of the OWSS raised a sum of £30 8s 6d which entitled them to name a bed for 6 months. The society chose to call the bed "Orcadian". Further donations followed and letters were received from soldiers who spent time in the bed.

== Notable members ==
- Dr Mary McNeill
- Bina Cursiter
- James Cursiter, uncle of Stanley Cursiter

== See also ==
In 2019, a short film about the society won an award at the Scottish Short Film Festival.

- Feminism in the United Kingdom
- List of suffragists and suffragettes
- List of women's rights activists
- List of women's rights organizations
- Timeline of women's suffrage
- Women's suffrage organizations
