= Kirkwall =

Town on Orkney, Scotland

Coordinates: 58.981°N 2.960°W

Kirkwall: Scots: Kirkwa / Kirkwaa / Kirkwal
- Town
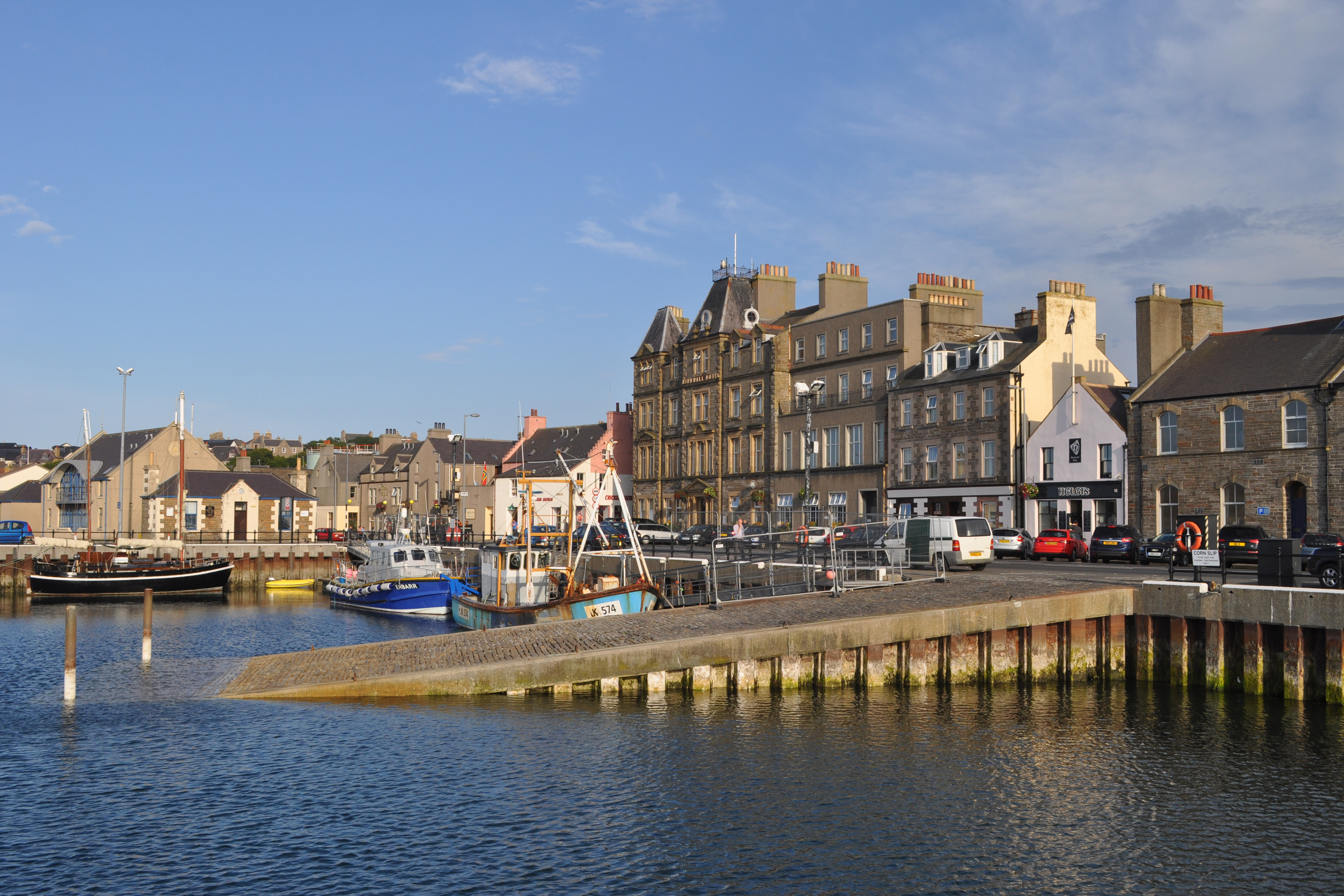
- Kirkwall Harbour in August 2014

- Location within Orkney
- Area: 4.00 km^{2} (1.54 sq mi)
- Population: 10,020 (2022)
  - Density: 2,505/km^{2} (6,490/sq mi)
- Demonym: Kirkwallian
- OS grid reference: HY449109
  - Edinburgh: 210 mi (340 km)
  - London: 528 mi (850 km)
- Council area: Orkney
- Lieutenancy area: Orkney
- Country: Scotland
- Sovereign state: United Kingdom
- Post town: KIRKWALL
- Postcode district: KW15
- Dialling code: 01856
- Police: Scotland
- Fire: Scottish
- Ambulance: Scottish
- UK Parliament: Orkney and Shetland
- Scottish Parliament: Orkney

Kirkwall (Scots: Kirkwa, Kirkwaa, or Kirkwal; Norn: Kirkavå; Scottish Gaelic: Bàgh na h-Eaglaise) is a port town and historic royal burgh in Orkney, an archipelago to the north of mainland Scotland. It is approximately 210 miles (340 km) north of Edinburgh, 221 miles (356 km) north-northeast of Glasgow, and 124 miles (200 km) north-northwest of Aberdeen. It had a population of 9,293 in 2011, making it the largest town in Orkney, and the Northern Isles.

First mentioned in the Orkneyinga saga, it is today the location of the headquarters of the Orkney Islands Council and a transport hub with ferries to many locations. It is the centre of the St Magnus International Festival and is also a popular stopping off point for cruise ships. St Magnus Cathedral stands at the heart of the town.

== Etymology ==
The name Kirkwall comes from the Norse name Kirkjuvágr meaning "church bay", the settlement having been established by the Norsemen in the 11th century. As late as 1525 the name is recorded as Kirkevaag. This became in time "Kirkwaa" and then eventually Kirkwall - but how the second syllable came to be spelled "wall" is not certain. MacBain quotes F. W. L. Thomas: "How, I ask, could vágr come to be represented by wall? Whence came the ll? Was it that Scottish immigrants finding the sound of vá represented it in writing by 'wall,' the ll at first being silent?" (Note: Jakobsen writes that the name is "erroneously spelt 'Kirkwall' ".)

== History ==
The town was first mentioned in the Orkneyinga saga in the year 1046, when it was recorded as the residence of Rögnvald Brusason, the Earl of Orkney, who was killed by his uncle Thorfinn the Mighty.

In 1486, King James III of Scotland elevated Kirkwall to the status of a royal burgh, and in time it would return a Burgh commissioner to the Parliament of Scotland.

After Union with England it combined with other towns to form the Northern Burghs, sending a single MP to Parliament. In 1918, the Parliamentary Burgh of Kirkwall merged into Orkney and Shetland.

=== Earth houses ===
On the western edge of the town, surrounded by Hatston Industrial Estate, there is a prehistoric monument, known as the "Grain Earth House" (see Historic Scotland). It is a short, low, stone-walled passage, deep underground, leading to a small pillared chamber.

This kind of earth house (or "souterrain") is characteristic of the Northern Isles (although the Grain Earth House is unusually deep below ground). It was originally connected to a surface dwelling, which has since disappeared. The purpose of these Iron Age structures remains unknown. Further west, towards Grimbister, there is a similar structure, known as Rennibister Earth House.

== Fishing ==
The Annual Report of the Fishery Board for 1913 provides an insight into the fishing industry at Stornoway at that time: "Local fishermen employed at line fishing throughout the year. Considerable quantities of cod landed by trawlers and Faroe smacks for curing purposes. Herrings all landed by stranger fishermen".

Fishery Statistics

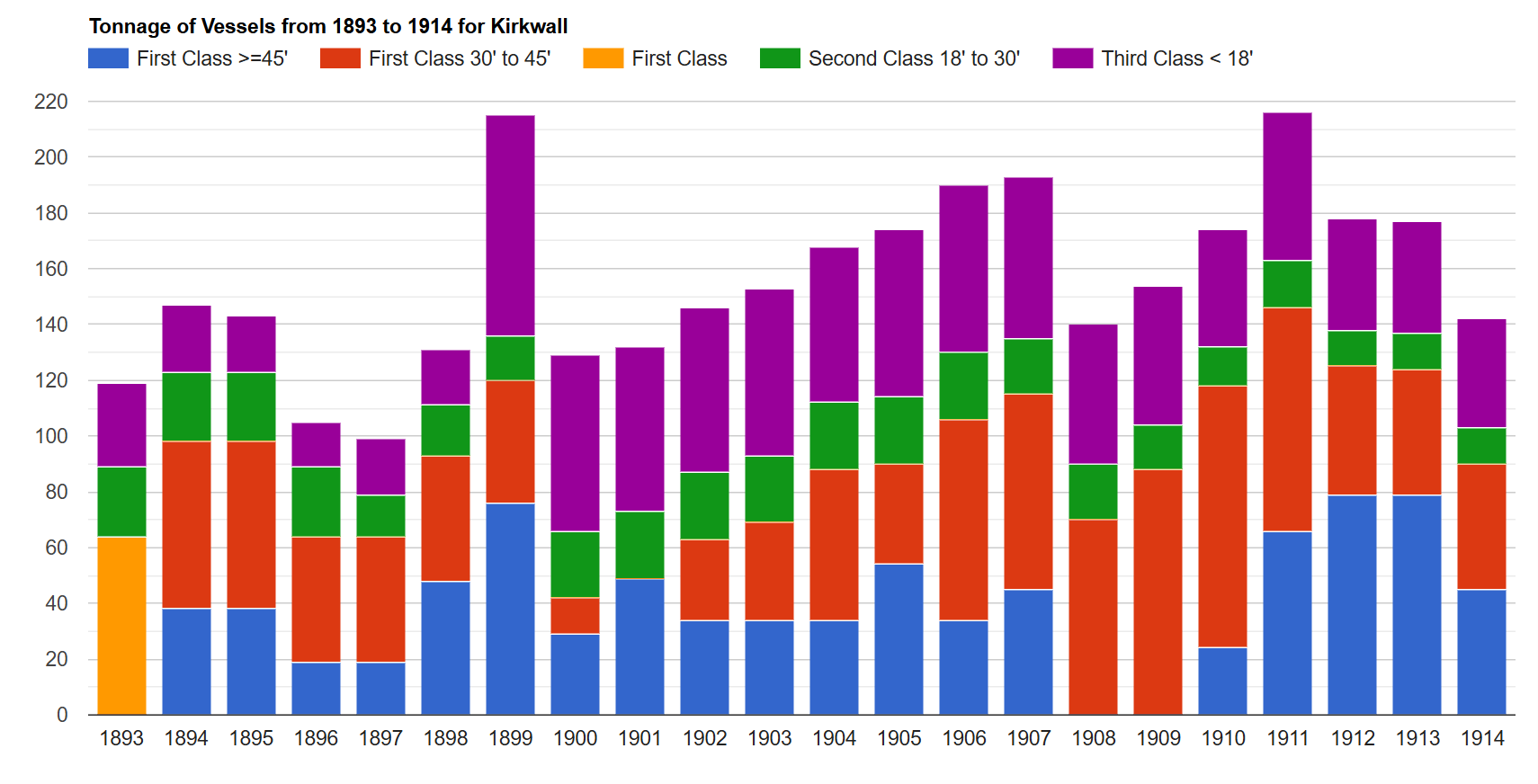
Tonnage of vessels

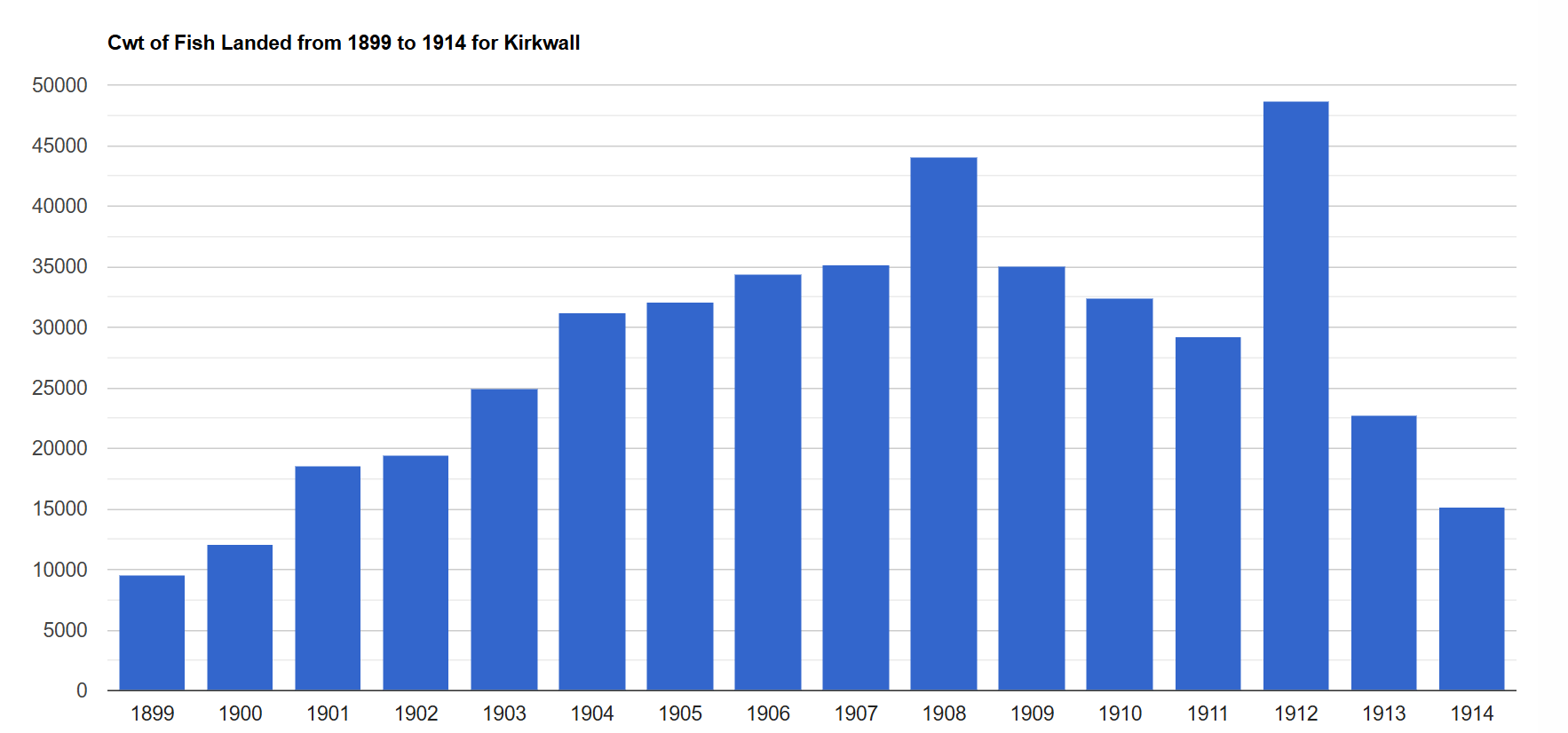
Cwt of fish landed (excluding shellfish)

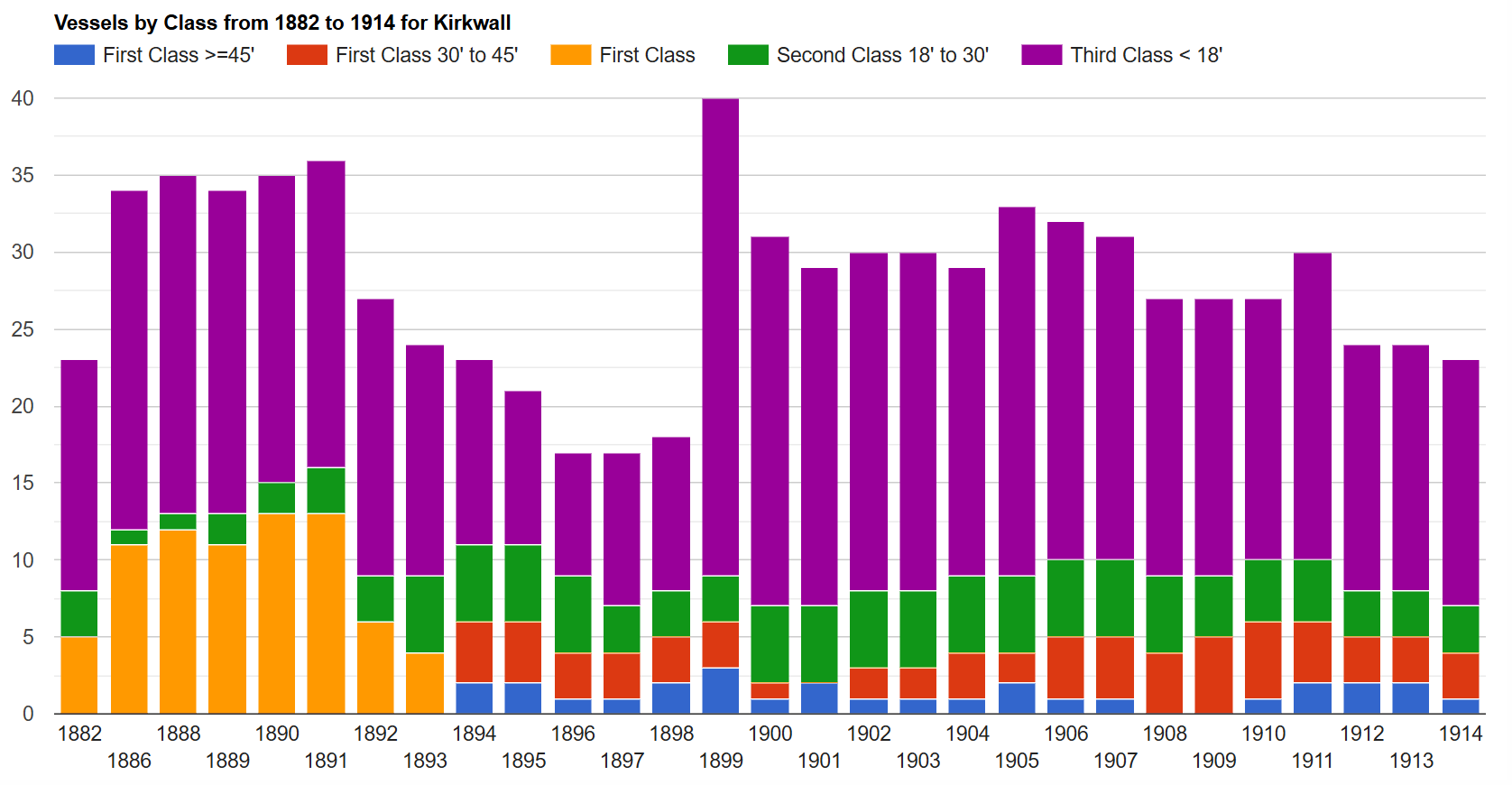
Vessels by class

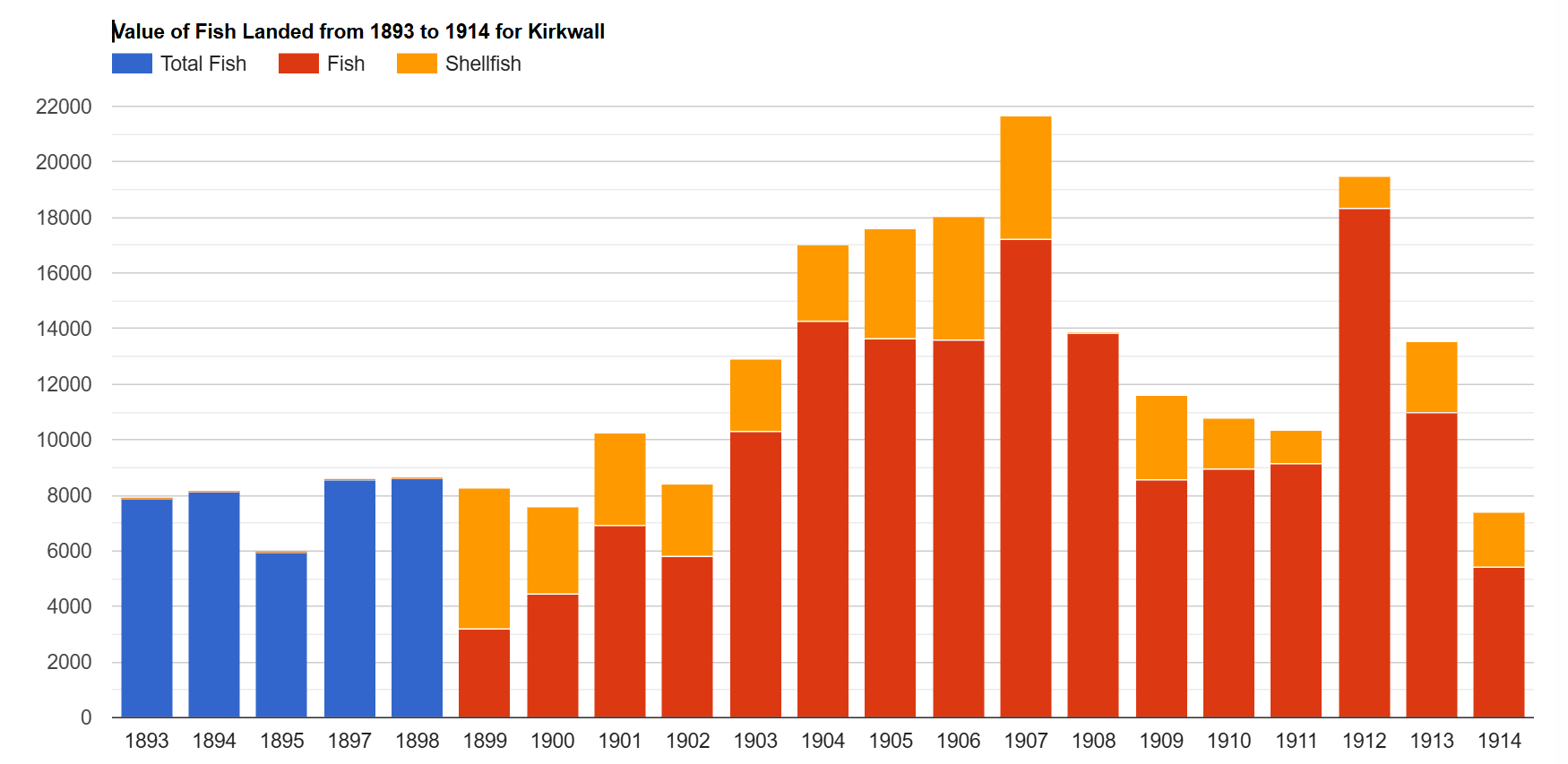
Value (£) of fish landed

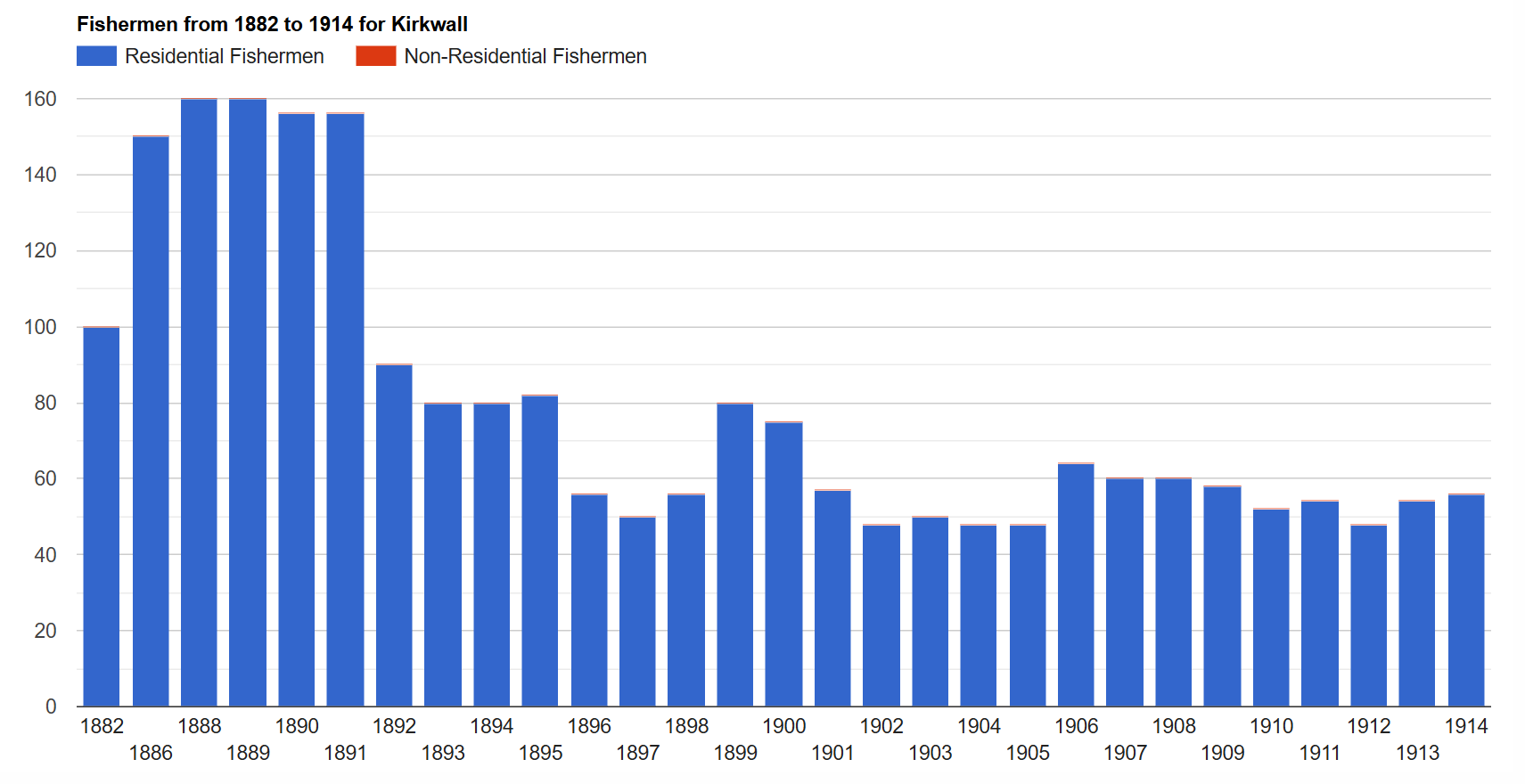
Fishermen

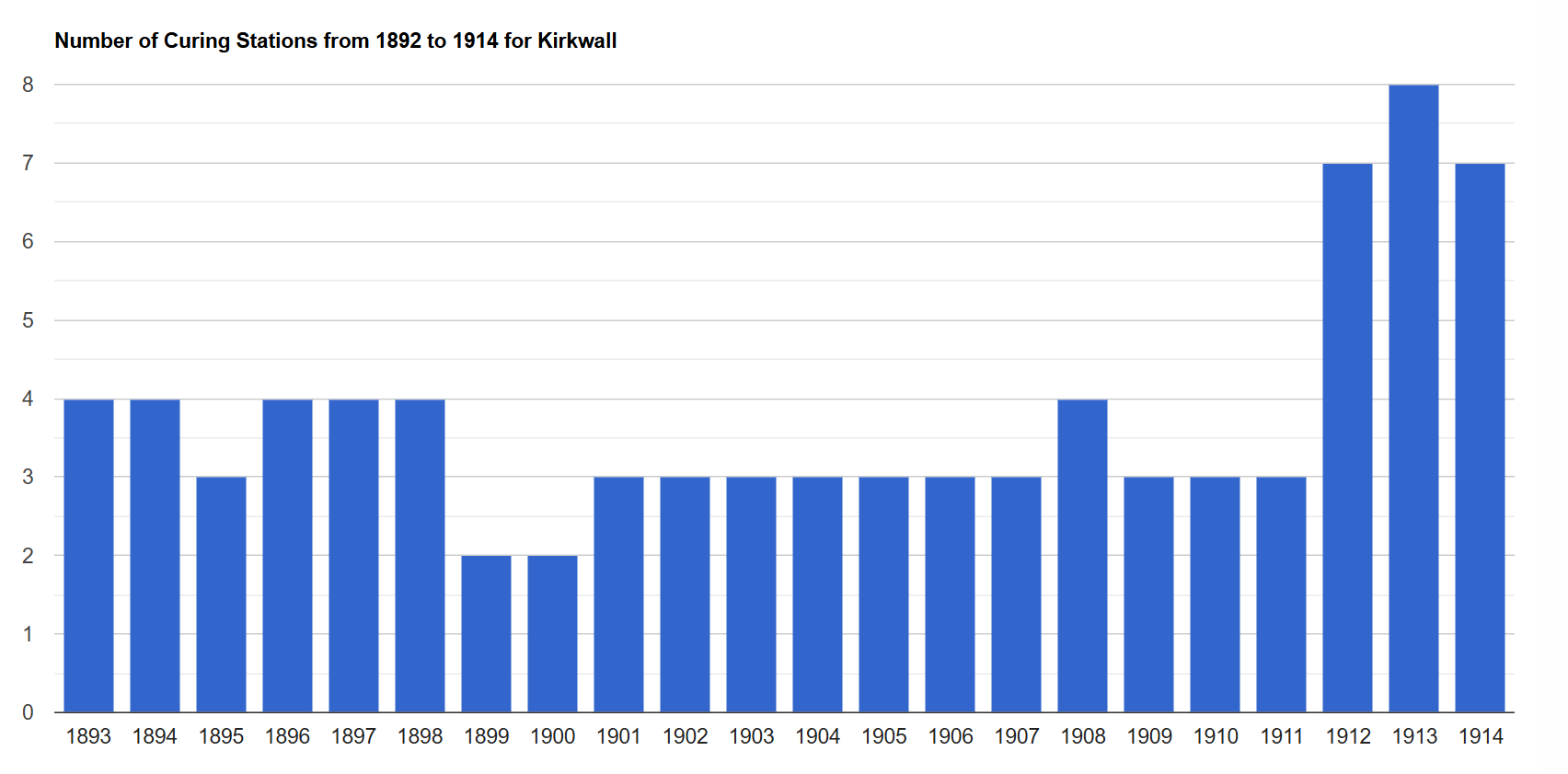
Number of curing stations

== Governance ==
Kirkwall is the administrative centre of Orkney, and the site of the headquarters of both Orkney Islands Council and NHS Orkney.

Although sometimes referred to as "The City and Royal Burgh of Kirkwall" Kirkwall is technically recognised as a cathedral city. (Note: See city status in the United Kingdom. Aberdeen, Dundee, Edinburgh, Elgin, Glasgow and Perth were the only burghs listed as cities in 1972.)

== Geography ==
Kirkwall is 130 miles (210 kilometres) north of Aberdeen and 528 mi (850 km) north of London. It is situated on the northern coast of Mainland, Orkney, with its harbours in the bay of Kirkwall to the north, and with Scapa Flow 1.4 mi (2.3 km) to the south. Its parish, St Ola, forms the isthmus between Firth and Holm. It is the most populous island settlement in Scotland.

=== Climate ===
Kirkwall has an oceanic climate (Cfb), with a strong maritime influence on its temperature. As a result, it is generally cooler than the rest of the UK in the summer. The exception is that Kirkwall tends to be warmer than Shetland, being closer to mainland Scotland and thus further south.

Climate data for Kirkwall, 26m asl, 1991–2020 normals, Extremes 1951–
Month	Jan	Feb	Mar	Apr	May	Jun	Jul	Aug	Sep	Oct	Nov	Dec	Year
Record high °C (°F)	12.2 (54.0)	12.8 (55.0)	18.9 (66.0)	21.0 (69.8)	22.0 (71.6)	22.8 (73.0)	25.6 (78.1)	24.8 (76.6)	22.8 (73.0)	19.4 (66.9)	14.5 (58.1)	12.9 (55.2)	25.6 (78.1)
Mean maximum °C (°F)	9.9 (49.8)	10.4 (50.7)	12.3 (54.1)	14.5 (58.1)	17.4 (63.3)	19.1 (66.4)	20.6 (69.1)	20.1 (68.2)	18.7 (65.7)	15.1 (59.2)	12.4 (54.3)	11.0 (51.8)	21.5 (70.7)
Mean daily maximum °C (°F)	6.6 (43.9)	6.8 (44.2)	8.0 (46.4)	9.9 (49.8)	12.2 (54.0)	14.2 (57.6)	16.1 (61.0)	16.2 (61.2)	14.4 (57.9)	11.6 (52.9)	8.9 (48.0)	7.0 (44.6)	11.0 (51.8)
Daily mean °C (°F)	4.5 (40.1)	4.5 (40.1)	5.4 (41.7)	7.0 (44.6)	8.5 (47.3)	11.3 (52.3)	13.2 (55.8)	13.4 (56.1)	11.8 (53.2)	9.3 (48.7)	6.7 (44.1)	4.8 (40.6)	8.4 (47.1)
Mean daily minimum °C (°F)	2.3 (36.1)	2.1 (35.8)	2.7 (36.9)	4.1 (39.4)	5.8 (42.4)	8.4 (47.1)	10.3 (50.5)	10.5 (50.9)	9.2 (48.6)	7.0 (44.6)	4.5 (40.1)	2.6 (36.7)	5.8 (42.4)
Mean minimum °C (°F)	−1.6 (29.1)	−1.9 (28.6)	−1.7 (28.9)	−0.3 (31.5)	1.1 (34.0)	4.3 (39.7)	6.3 (43.3)	6.3 (43.3)	4.4 (39.9)	2.2 (36.0)	0.3 (32.5)	−1.7 (28.9)	−3.2 (26.2)
Record low °C (°F)	−7.8 (18.0)	−7 (19)	−6.8 (19.8)	−4.9 (23.2)	−2.1 (28.2)	1.0 (33.8)	0.0 (32.0)	3.7 (38.7)	0.5 (32.9)	−1.6 (29.1)	−5.5 (22.1)	−7.6 (18.3)	−7.8 (18.0)
Average precipitation mm (inches)	114.7 (4.52)	96.2 (3.79)	86.7 (3.41)	59.2 (2.33)	53.8 (2.12)	55.9 (2.20)	58.2 (2.29)	73.0 (2.87)	90.7 (3.57)	119.8 (4.72)	126.1 (4.96)	114.3 (4.50)	1,048.6 (41.28)
Average precipitation days (≥ 1.0 mm)	20.4	17.6	16.9	14.1	11.9	10.8	12.1	12.6	15.2	19.1	20.5	19.9	191.1
Mean monthly sunshine hours	34.1	64.0	102.0	144.3	193.5	145.0	138.8	134.6	107.8	76.3	44.0	26.1	1,210.4
Source 1: Met Office
Source 2: Royal Dutch Meteorological Institute/KMNI Infoclimat

== Demography ==
The population of Kirkwall is continuously on the rise. The population rose from 6,205 in 2001 to 9,293 in 2011.. It had previously been estimated to have 10,020 in mid-2020.

== Economy ==
Kirkwall harbour with nearly 1 kilometre (0.6 mi) of quay edge is the second commercial hub for Orkney after Hatston. There is a Marina, and support for fishing and dive vessels. After extensive work on harbour facilities, the town has become a popular cruise ship stop, with several ships arriving each week in the season. This has added to the prosperity of the town and allowed a thriving sector of independently owned shops. Each year now, approx 140 cruise ships visit Kirkwall and Stromness.

Weaving in Orkney took place from Viking times, with John Sclater & Co involved in Tweed production in Kirkwall in the 1970s. They used the brand names Norsaga and Jarltex.

== Culture and community ==
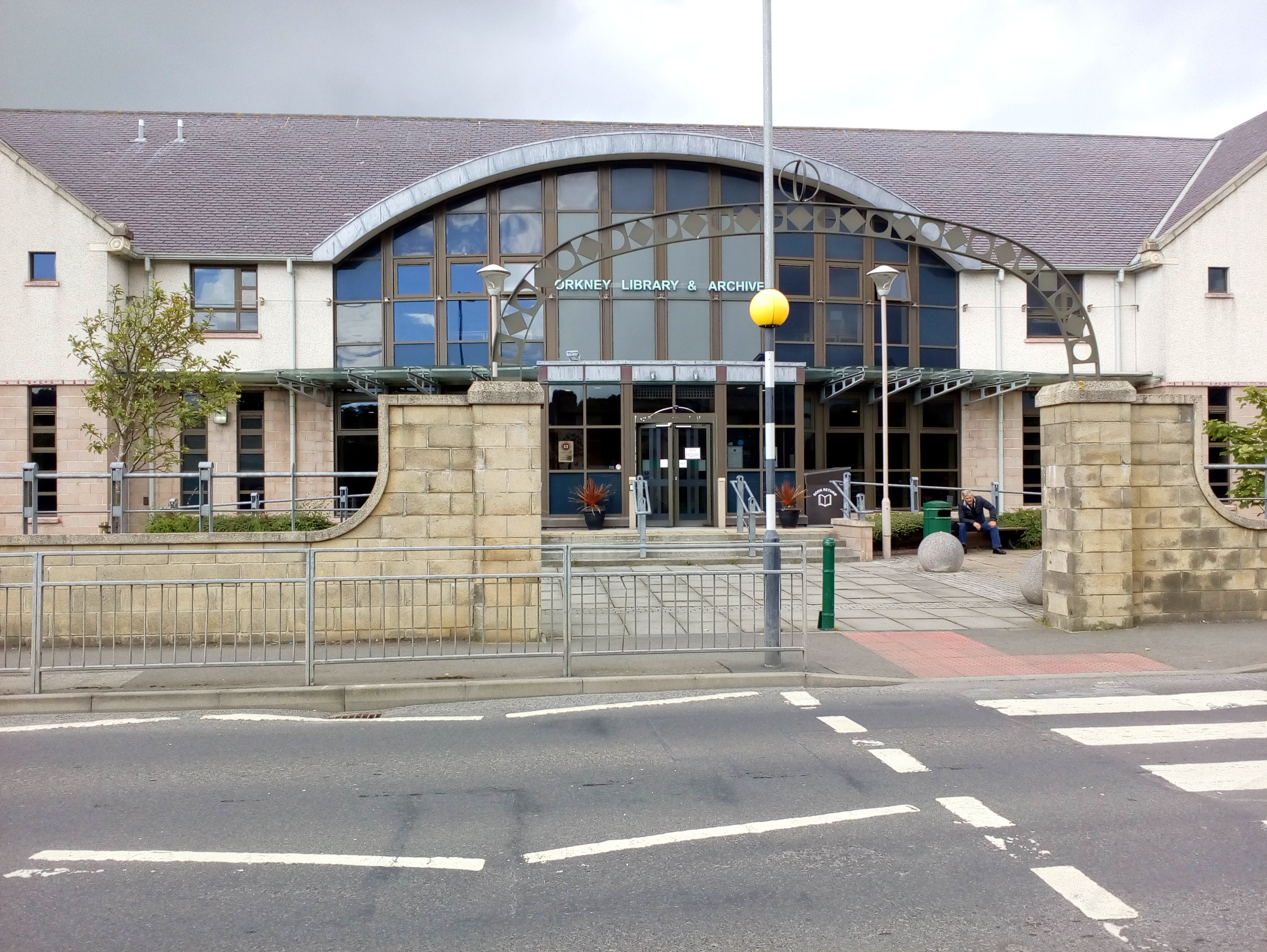
Orkney Library and Archive, Kirkwall

The Orkney Library and Archive is in Kirkwall. Kirkwall also has the most northerly of the world's Carnegie libraries, which was opened by Andrew Carnegie and his wife in 1909. The building survives, although the library has since moved to a larger building on Junction Road which opened in August 2003.

The town has two museums, the larger being The Orkney Museum in Tankerness House, which contains items of local historical interest within one of Scotland's best-preserved 16th-century town-houses. It is a Category A listed building Scotland. The prehistoric, Pictish and Viking collections are of international importance. The other museum is the Orkney Wireless Museum, dealing with the history of radio and recorded sound. It is located in a Category C listed building, possibly the former harbour master's office, on Junction Road. Orkney Tourist Board is located in an 18th-century Category B listed building on Broad Street.

There is a Royal National Lifeboat Institution lifeboat station.

One of the major annual events in the town is the Ba Game, held each Christmas Day and New Year's Day between the Uppies and the Doonies, each team representing one half of the town.

=== Media and the arts ===
The composer Peter Maxwell Davies was among a group which founded the annual St Magnus International Festival which is centred on Kirkwall each midsummer. Notable music acts such as the Wrigley Sisters and Bryttania formed in Kirkwall.

Orkney Theatre, a 384-seat venue, was opened in 2014 next to Kirkwall Grammar School in The Meadows. It has an orchestra pit which can be made available for use by removing two rows of seats.

Kirkwall Harbour can be seen in The Highlands and Islands – A Royal Tour, a 1973 documentary about Prince Charles' visit to the Highlands and Islands, directed by Oscar Marzaroli. Scottish film-maker Margaret Tait was born in Kirkwall, and many of her films (in particular the Aspects of Kirkwall series) are set there.

Long-running The Simpsons character Groundskeeper Willie was born in Kirkwall.

== Landmarks ==
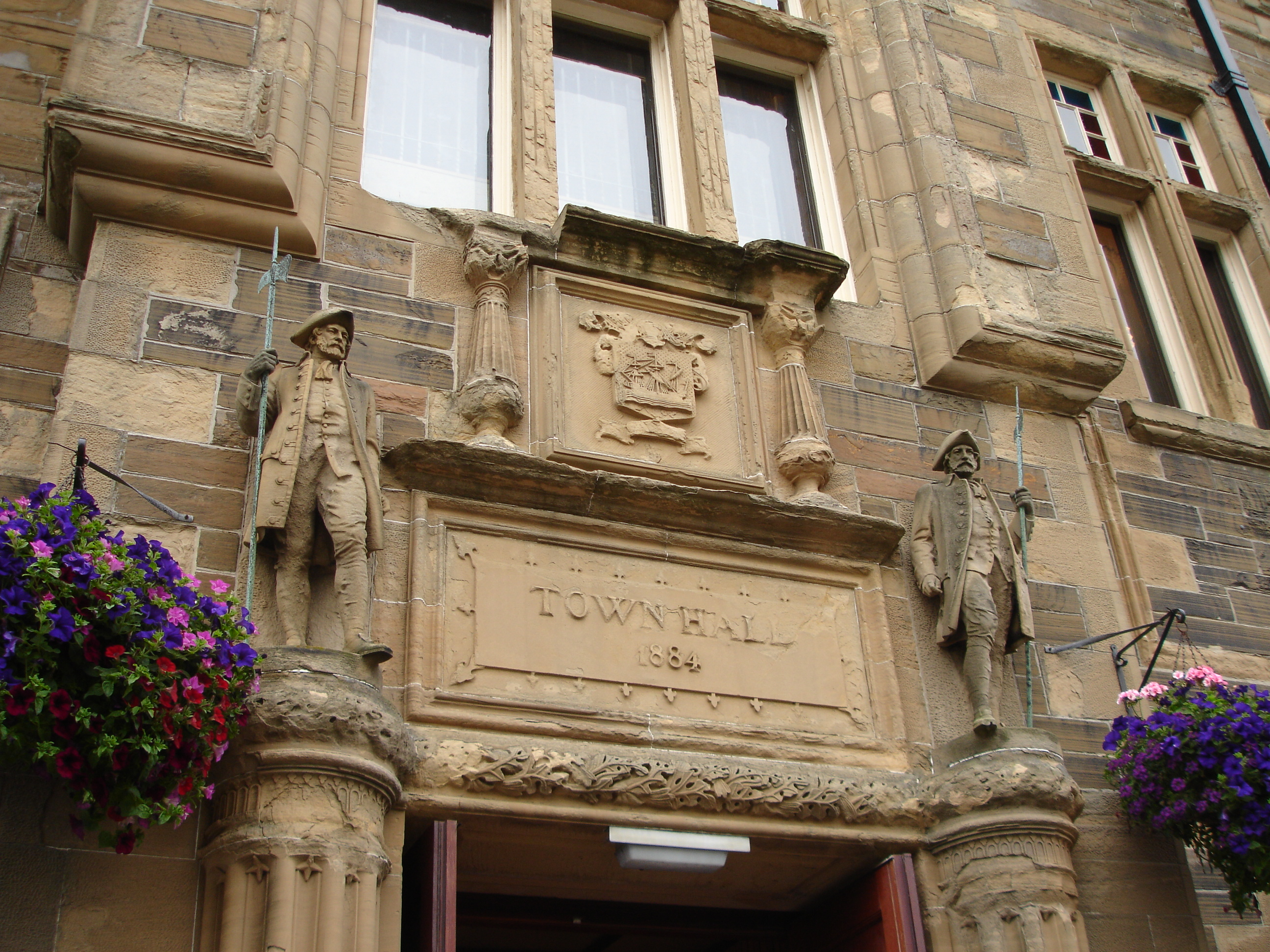
Kirkwall Town Hall exterior

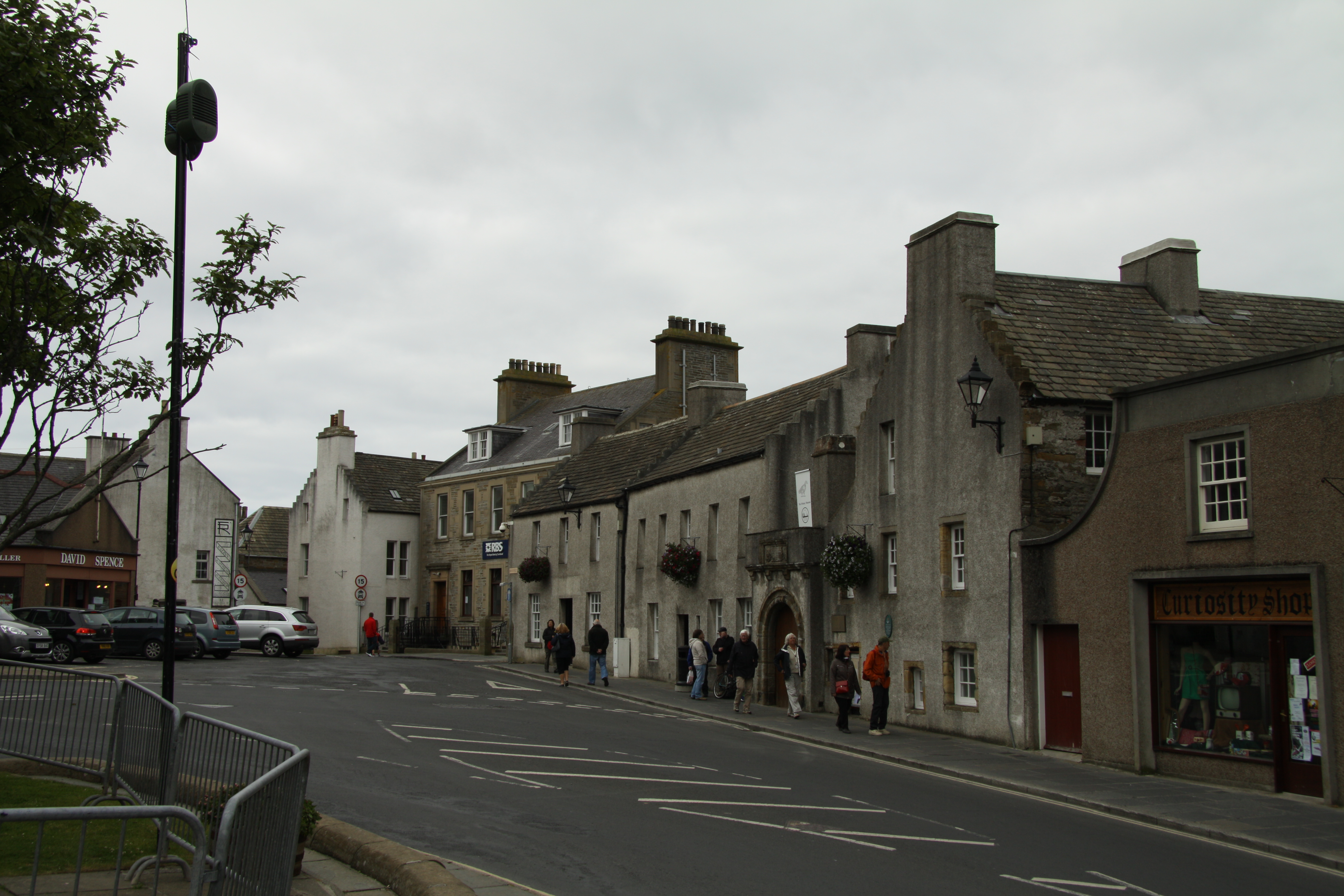
Broad Street in Kirkwall

Kirkwall has many 17th–18th-century houses and other structures in the local vernacular style. Kirkwall Town Hall was completed in 1884.

== Transport ==
Kirkwall is a port with ferry services to Aberdeen and Lerwick, as well as the principal north islands in the group. Hatson pier, the main ferry terminal, is some 2 mi (3 km) outside the town centre.

The Aberdeen, Leith, Clyde & Tay Shipping Company operated steamer services to Kirkwall from 1836, with successor companies operating until 2002.

Kirkwall Airport, the main airport for Orkney, is 2 1/2 mi (4 km) southeast of the town. There are no passenger rail services in Kirkwall, the nearby railways having been industrial or military.

== Education ==
=== Nursery schools ===
- Glaitness Nursery
- Papdale Nursery
- Peedie Breeks Nursery (closed 2020)
- Strynd Nursery
- Willow Tree Nursery

=== Primary schools ===
- Aurrida School
- Glaitness Primary School
- Papdale Primary School

=== Secondary schools ===
- Kirkwall Grammar School
- Stromness Academy

=== Colleges and universities ===
- Orkney College UHI
- Institute of Northern Studies

The oldest school in Kirkwall, Kirkwall Grammar School, has been established since circa 1200. The current school building was opened in 2014.

The Orkney College main campus is situated in Kirkwall, in a purpose-built building that opened in 2000.

== Religious sites ==
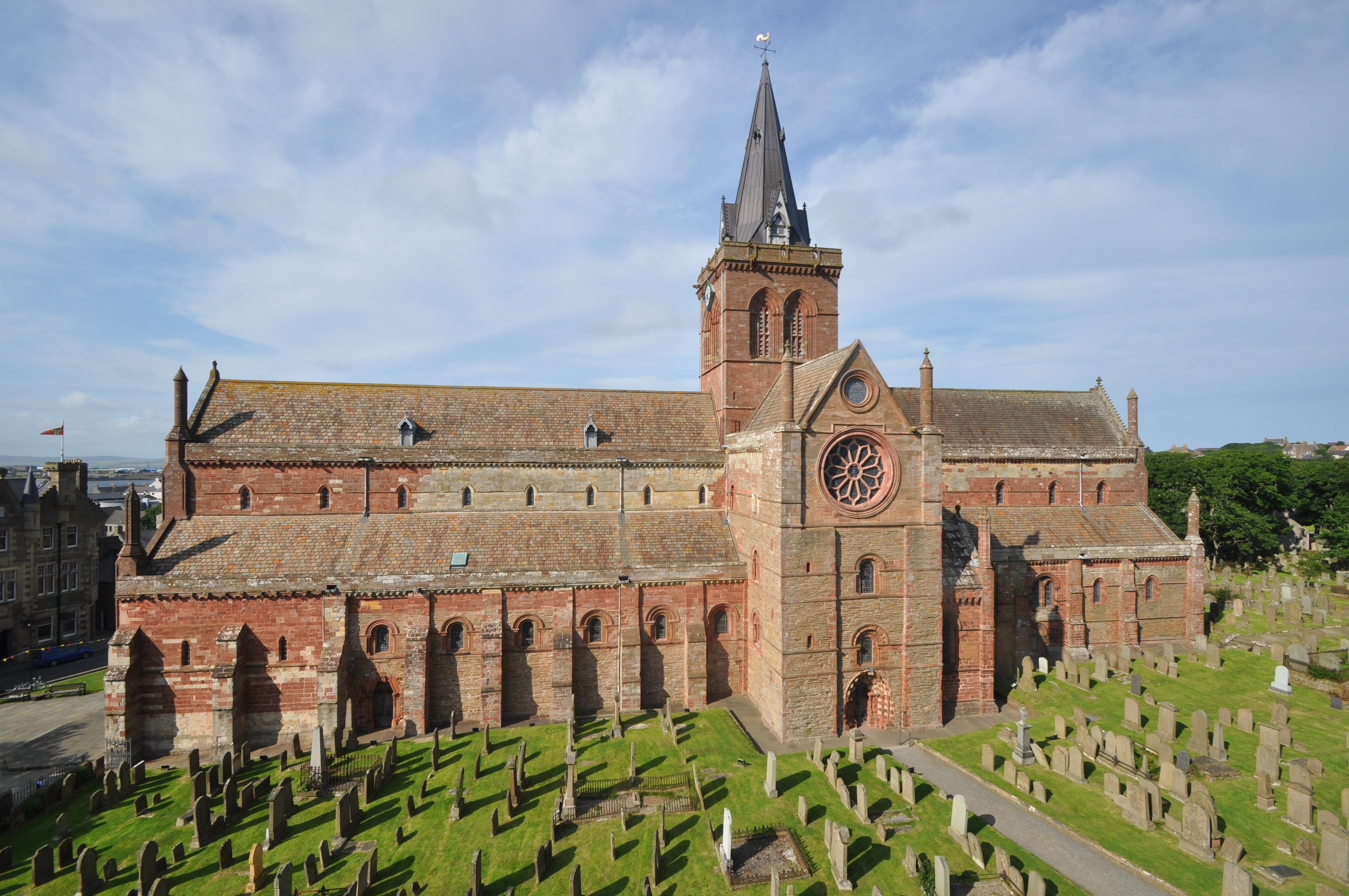
St Magnus Cathedral dominates the Kirkwall skyline

The 'Kirk' of Kirkwall was not the cathedral (which was originally at Birsay), but the 11th-century church of Saint Olaf of Norway. One late medieval doorway survives from this church, and an aumbry from the original church survives within the late 19th-century structure of the present-day Saint Olaf's Church (Episcopal) in the town's Dundas Crescent.

At the heart of the town stands St Magnus Cathedral, which was founded in memory of Saint Magnus Erlendsson, Earl of Orkney 1108–1117 by Earl (later Saint) Rögnvald Kali. Next to the cathedral are the ruins of the former Bishop's Palace and Earl's Palace.

== Sport ==
The Pickaquoy Centre, Orkney's largest leisure centre, is located in Kirkwall, which opened in 1999.

Kirkwall Grammar School Sports Centre has indoor sports facilities, and grass and synthetic pitches, available to the public.

== Twin town – sister city ==
Kirkwall is twinned with:

- Moena, Trentino-Alto Adige/Südtirol (since 1996)

== Notable people ==
- Conran of Orkney, 7th-century Bishop of the Orkneys
- David Scollay, merchant burgess and 16th-century Provost of Kirkwall.
- Mary Anne Baikie, suffragist who established the Orcadian Women's Suffrage Society (OWSS)
- Stanley Cursiter, Painter and Limner, born in East Road
- Ola Gorie, jewellery designer
- Peter Marshall (born 1964), historian, educated in Kirkwall.
- Clara Anne Williams (née Rendall) (Kirkwall, 24 July 1887), missionary, teacher, wife of Rev. Aeneas Francon Williams, was awarded the Kaisar-i-Hind medal in 1946 for her work during WWII being in-charge of Red Cross work in Dooars, Bengal, India.
- Ann Scott-Moncrieff (1914–1943), author and writer
- Thomas Stewart Traill (1781–1862), physician, chemist, meteorologist, zoologist, born in Kirkwall
