= The Orkney Museum =

Museum in the Orkney Islands, Scotland

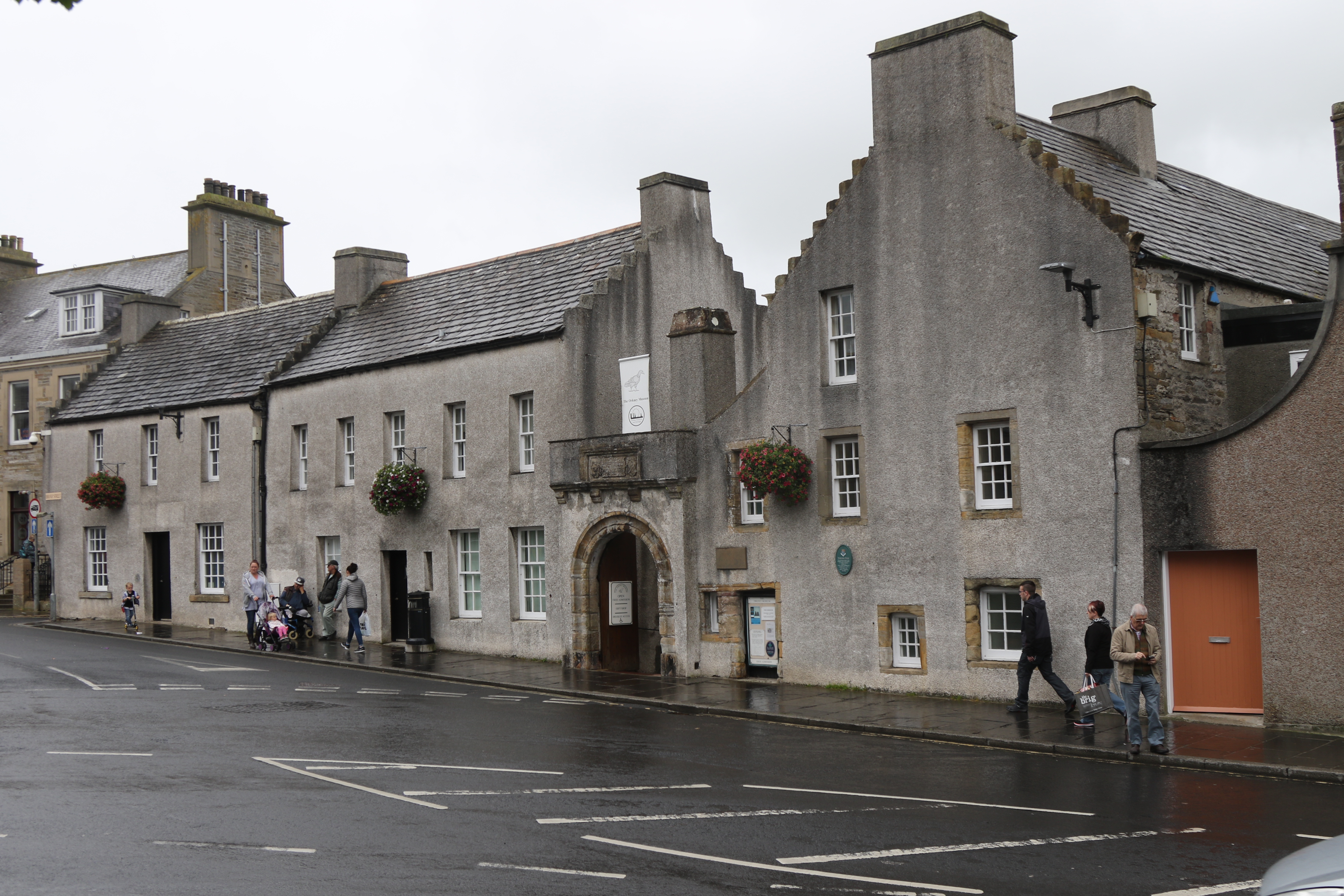
- Tankerness House on Broad Street, Kirkwall

- Location within Orkney Islands
- Former name: Tankerness House Museum
- Established: 1968
- Location: Kirkwall, Orkney, Scotland
- Coordinates: 58.9815°N 2.9608°W
- Owner: Orkney Islands Council
- Website: www.orkneymuseums.co.uk

The Orkney Museum, formerly Tankerness House Museum, is a history museum in Kirkwall, Orkney, Scotland. Run by Orkney Islands Council, the museum covers the history of the Orkney Islands from the Stone Age through the Picts and Vikings to the present day.

The museum was founded in 1968 as Tankerness House Museum and in 1999 changed its name to The Orkney Museum.

Items in the collection include the Viking whalebone plaque from the Scar boat burial, a Pictish symbol stone from the Knowe of Burrian, and the wooden box in which the remains of Saint Magnus Erlendsson were kept.

== Tankerness House ==
The museum is housed within Tankerness House, a Category A listed former townhouse complex centred around a courtyard and sited opposite St Magnus Cathedral in central Kirkwall. The house is considered one of the most important early townhouses in Scotland.

The earliest parts of the building (the north and south wings) were constructed in the 1530s as two separate houses that served as manses for the cathedral. Following the Scottish Reformation the houses were purchased from the church by the archdeacon Gilbert Foulzie, who in 1574 built an additional wing (the east wing) and the entrance archway facing onto Broad Street which bears his coat of arms and Latin inscriptions. He also had a large bench built in the courtyard, the 'dole's seat', where beggars would wait to receive alms from Foulzie.

In 1642 the buildings were sold by Foulzie's descendants to John Baikie of Tankerness, with the properties becoming known as Tankerness House and remaining part of the Baikie family estate for three centuries. The Baikies later built an additional wing, the west wing, in 1680 and the south-west gable in 1722.

In 1951 the Baikies sold the house to the local council, and in 1968 the building was restored and opened as the new Tankerness House Museum. The preserved Baikie library and drawing room remain on display.

== Gallery ==
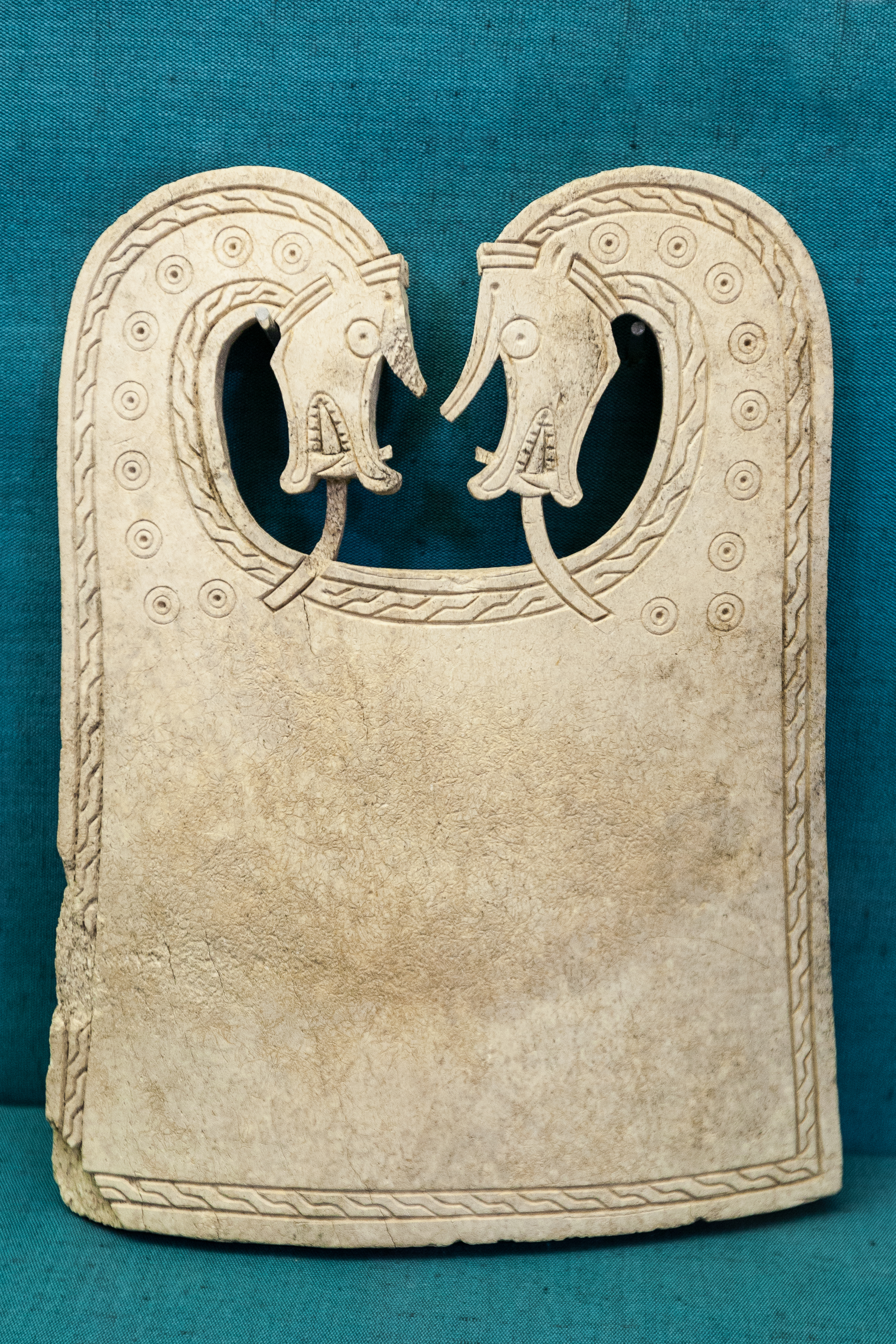
whalebone 'dragon' plaque from the Viking Scar boat burial

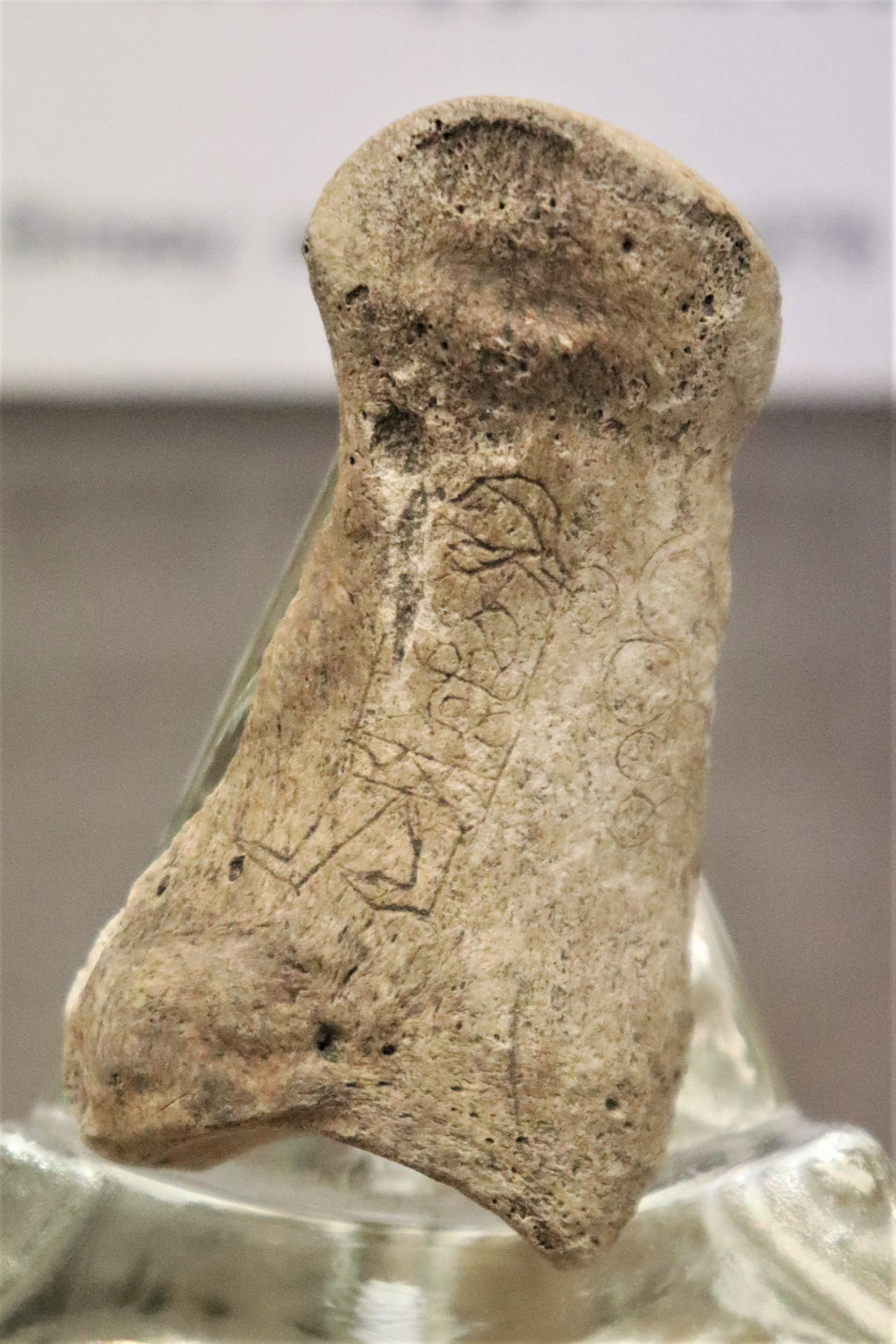
'Peedie Pict' Pictish carved figure on ox bone

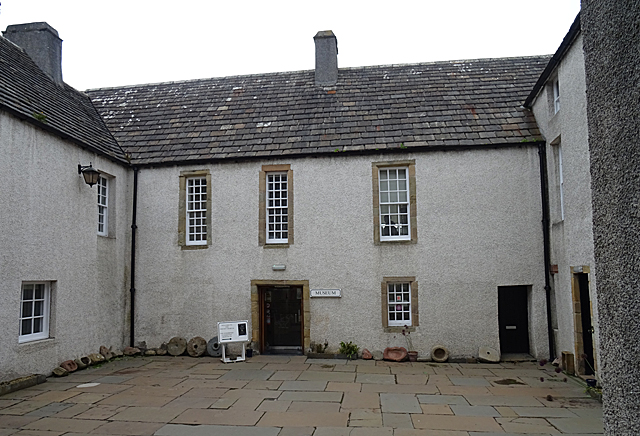
The central courtyard of Tankerness House
