= Women's suffrage in Scotland =

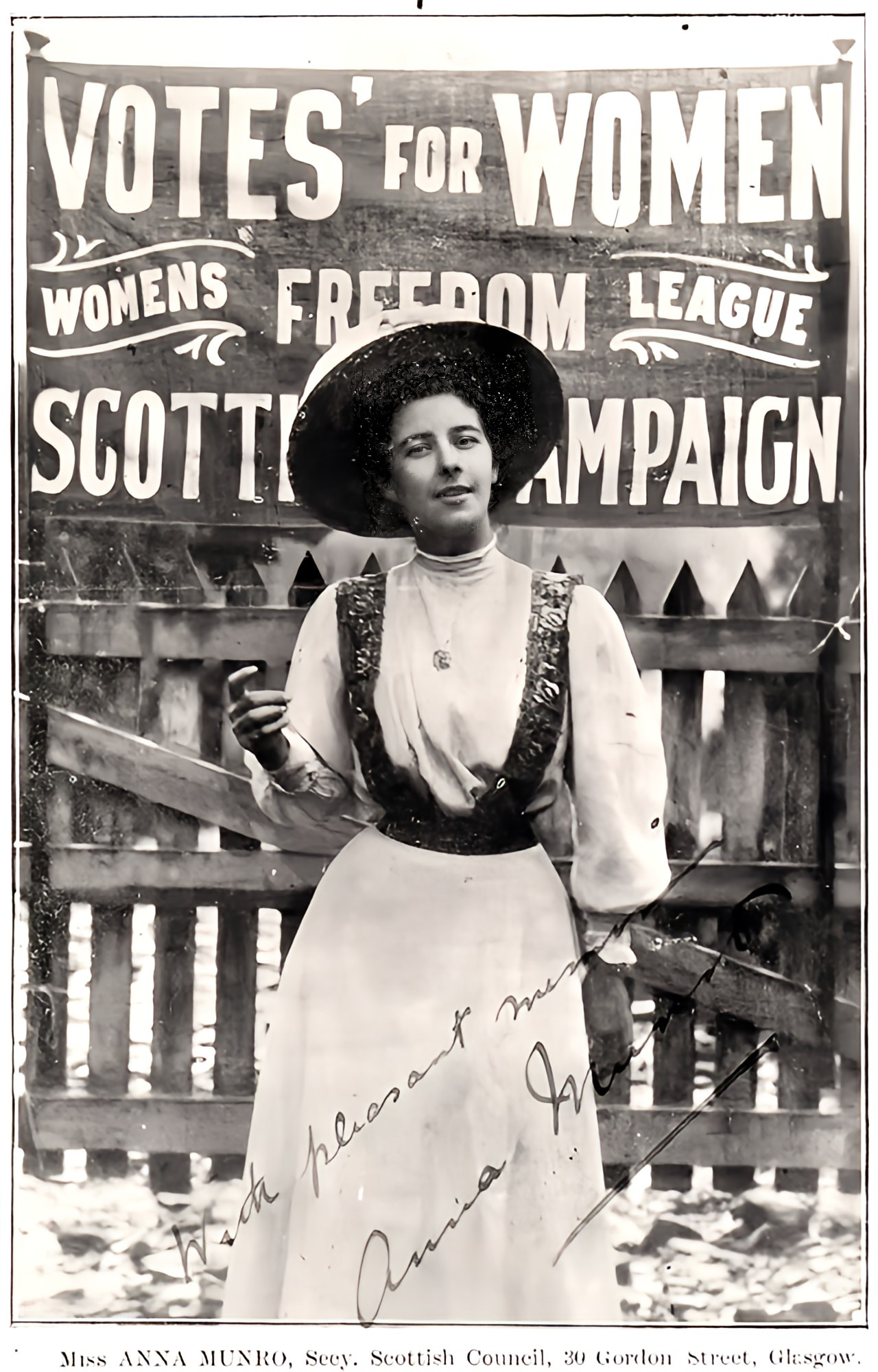
Anna Munro advertising the Scottish Women's Freedom League

The campaign for women's suffrage sought to secure the right of women to vote in elections. It was carried out by both men and women; it was a very prolonged and gruelling campaign that went on for 86 years before the Representation of the People Act 1918 was introduced on 6 February 1918, which gave some women the right to vote.

One of the first three UK societies supporting women's rights to vote was established in 1867, in Scotland's capital, the Edinburgh National Society for Women's Suffrage.

== Role of different groups ==
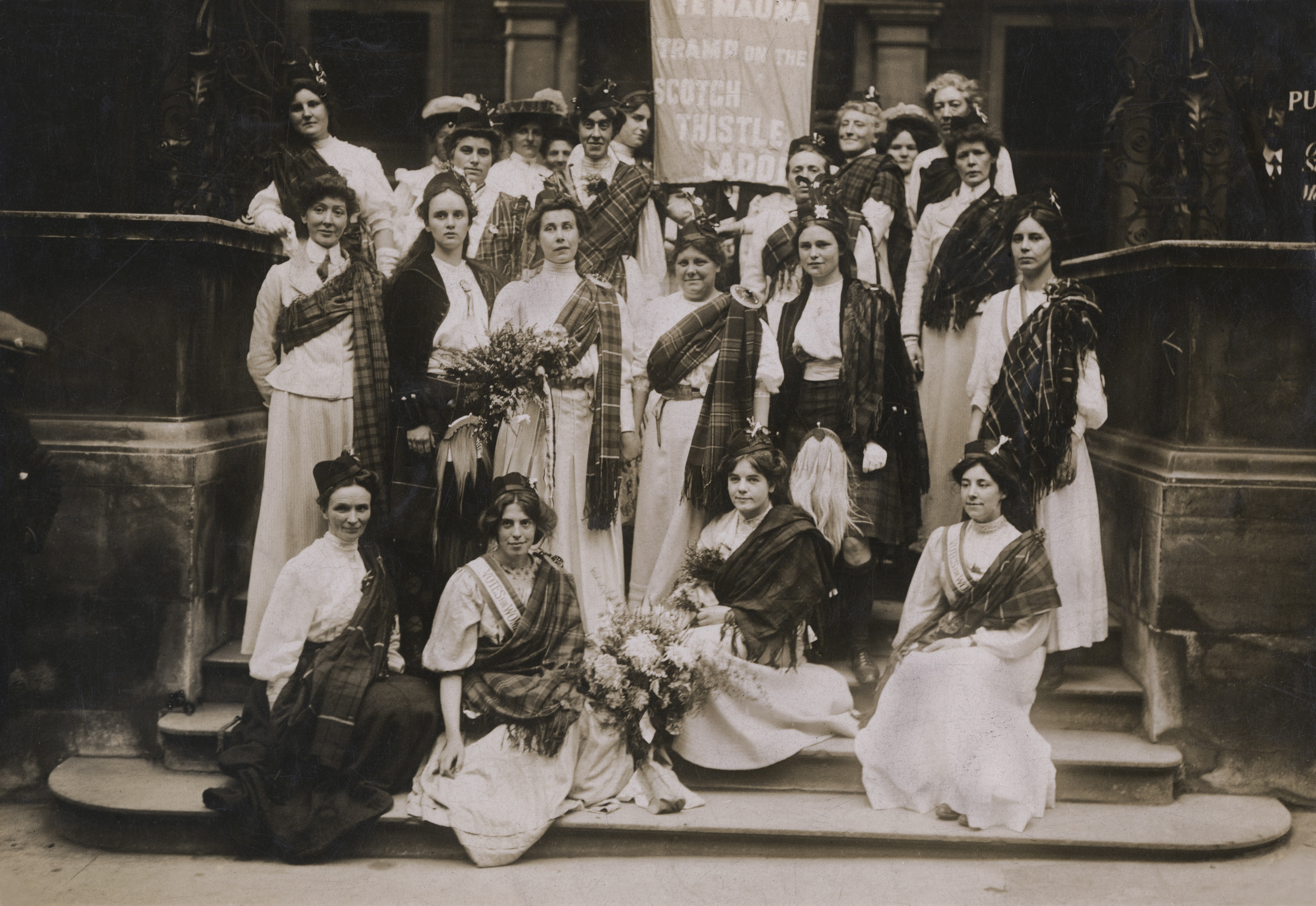
Scottish suffragettes released from prison with Flora Drummond

Later Scotland's suffragettes were part of the British Women's Social and Political Union militant movement and took part in campaigns locally and in London; for example when Winston Churchill arrived to stand for election as M.P. in Dundee in 1908 he was followed by 27 of the national leaders of the women's suffrage movements. At one point he even hid in a shed and tried to host a meeting there.

Scottish women like Flora Drummond had leadership roles with the Pankhursts, in the London WSPU headquarters, and celebrated the Scottish community of activists on their release from prison. Others like Frances Parker from New Zealand, were organising the West of Scotland WSPU and like others was infamously subjected to force feeding orally and rectally in Scottish and British prisons. Parker was also arrested when trying to disrupt David Lloyd George from giving a speech in the Music Hall in Aberdeen, and allegedly set fire to Burns Cottage in Alloway, Ayrshire.

There were many Scottish women across all classes who took an active role in the movement to draw attention to the growing demands for equal right to Votes for Women.

Scottish branches of the National Union of Women's Suffrage Societies were active in the main cities and even in the rural and remote areas such as Dornoch, in the Highlands, Stornoway with 27 women forming a suffrage association, from the remote Western Isles (the Hebrides), as well as NUWSS Orcadian group in Orkney and a Shetland suffrage society.

== Awareness raising educational resources and creative works ==
In 2024, only one accessible image of a (known) black Scottish suffragist Jessie M. Soga, who was also a soprano singer, has been identified, and is it unclear if there were other Scottish women of colour campaigning for the vote. Dr. TS Beall said Scotland's suffragists' and suffragettes' activities were 'not taught much' in Scottish schools, and their names were not generally known.

Soga was included in a new educational game (Top Trumps-style) called Scotland's Suffragettes Trumps cards, created by Protests & Suffragettes (an organisation led by artists, activists and local historians including Dr. Beall). This was created by crowdfunding to send 700 sets to schools across Scotland. One hundred Scotland's Suffrage History Education Packs, explaining the movement, and including the cards were sent to Scottish schools. Women's History Scotland's Dr. Yvonne McFadden called it 'a fun and important tool to make sure these women and their stories' are included in the Scottish school curriculum, as women's history is often limited in a school's history teaching. The impact of these materials was discussed on Borders TV, including the recognition by primary school children that 'change makers' were based in their own communities in Kelso and Stranraer.

An interactive map of the specific places associated with the women's suffrage movement in Aberdeen and area, is available which shows how connected the women in this area were with the wider suffrage movement and in leadership roles. This was included into Wikipedia articles at a CodeTheCity, civic open data event called #CTC28 connections editathon in March 2023. And further details on activists for suffrage for women in Scotland were added through monthly Women in Red editathons at Edinburgh University since the centenary of women's right to vote.

Scottish Suffragettes Jessie Soga and Helen Crawfurd were memorialised in 2024 in stained glass window by Artist Keira McLean in Glasgow's Woodside Library. The window was co-designed with young people from SiMY Community Development in Townhead. McLean said "there are so many forgotten histories of people who made a real difference', and that the window is "restoring the neglected histories of communities often marginalised or dismissed.” The unveiling of the window took place at an event hosted by Glasgow Life on 5 September 2024 and featured new musical arrangements by Musician Lorna Morgan of the Holloway Jingles, poems written by imprisoned suffragettes. Historical information about Jessie Soga and Helen Crawfurd was shared by Clare Thompson from Protests & Suffragettes.

In 2025, an exhibition in Glasgow, marks the influence of suffragette, politician and local councillor, Jessie Stephen. The materials displayed include items loaned by her great-niece and local history shared at Maryhill Burgh Halls by women's historian, Anabel Marsh.

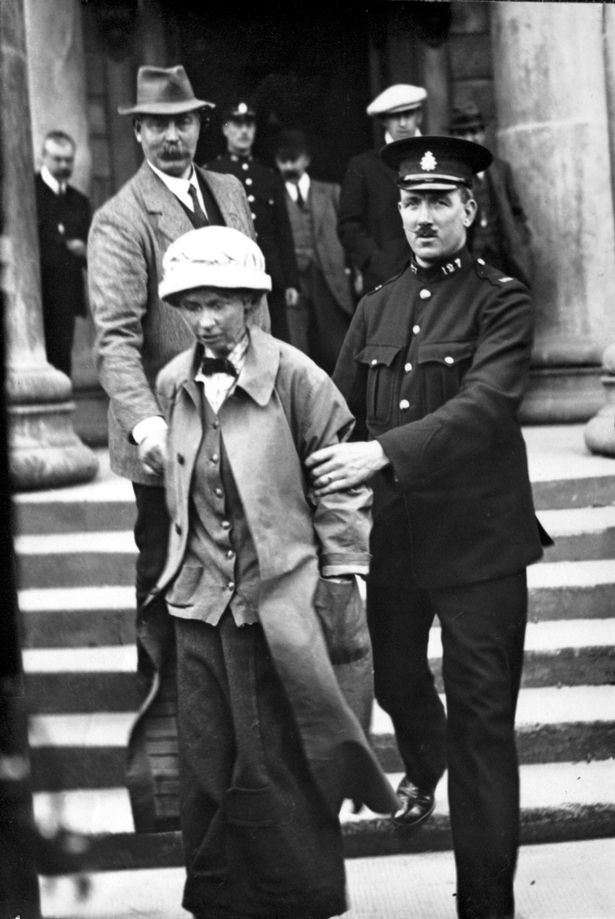
Fanny Parker being escorted out from Ayr Sheriff Court

== See also ==
- Bessie Watson
- Feminism in the United Kingdom
- List of suffragists and suffragettes
- List of women's rights activists
- List of women's rights organizations
- Timeline of women's suffrage
- Women's suffrage in the United Kingdom
- Women's suffrage in Wales
- Women's suffrage organizations
