= Holm of Melby =

Island in western Shetland, Scotland

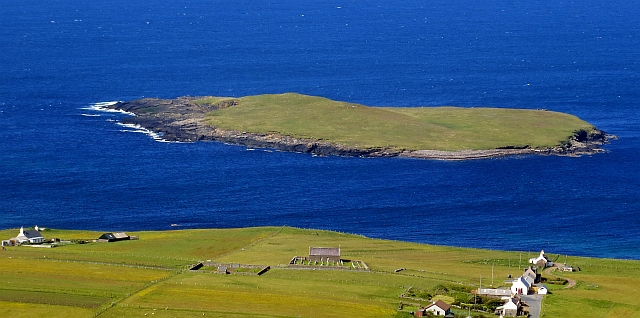
- View of the islet from Sandness

Location
- Location within Shetland
- OS grid reference: HU 19375 58350
- Coordinates: 60°18′32″N 1°39′04″W

Name
- Name meaning: small, rounded islet of Melby

Physical geography
- Island group: Shetland
- Area: c. 9 hectares (22.2 acres)
- Area rank: na
- Highest elevation: 20 metres (66 ft)

Administration
- Council area: Shetland
- Country: Scotland
- Sovereign state: United Kingdom

Demographics
- Population: 0

Holm of Melby is a small uninhabited island off Mainland, Shetland in Scotland. It lies in the Sound of Papa just offshore from the settlement of Melby in the district of Sandness.

It is less than a mile offshore from Melby and south-east of the nearby islands of Forewick Holm and Papa Stour. There is a natural arch on the north-west tip of the coastline. It is part of the Sandness Coast SSSI, the main feature of which is its rocky shoreline.

== Cairns ==
There are three ancient cairns in ruins on the island. At the site of the south cairn a few large stone slabs are visible protruding through the turf. There is no sign of an internal chamber. The north-western most cairn, which has no "discernible features" is about 10 metres (33 ft) in diameter.

The cairn to the north-east is 19.5 metres (64 ft) in diameter and about 1.2 metres (4 ft) high. A group of three large stones suggest the presence of a chamber.

== Gallery ==
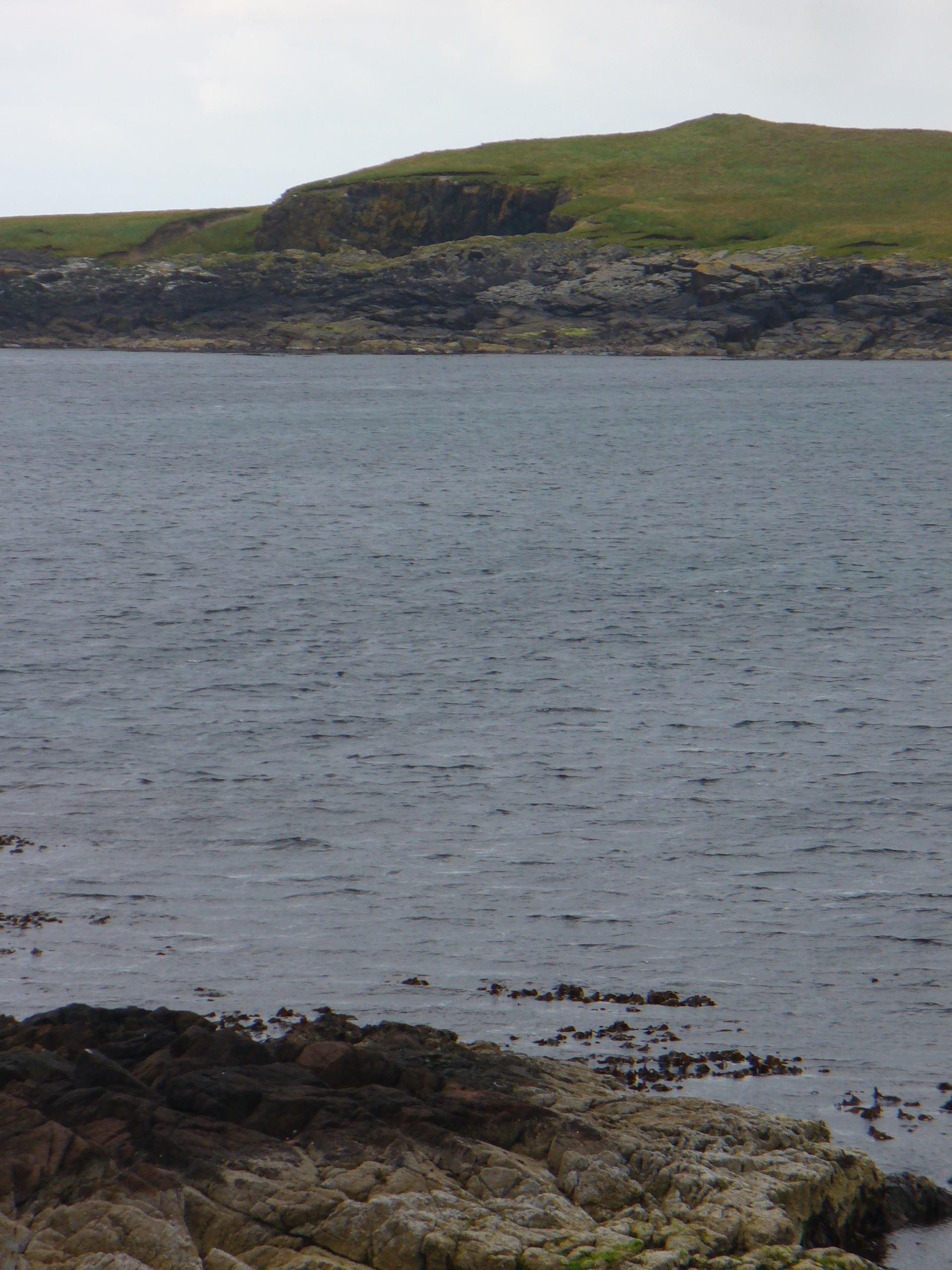
The cliffs of the Holm from the village of Melby, with the southern cairn visible at the summit

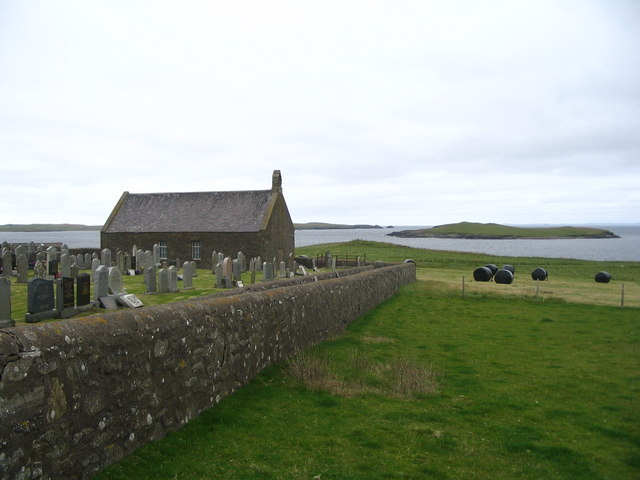
View from Melby churchyard
