= Papa Stour =

Island in the Shetland archipelago

Location
- Papa Stour shown within Shetland
- OS grid reference: HU169607
- Coordinates: 60.33°N 1.68°W

Name
- Name meaning: Norse for "big island of the papar (priests)"
- Old Norse name: Papey Stóra

Physical geography
- Island group: Shetland
- Area: 828 hectares (3.20 sq mi)
- Area rank: 59
- Highest elevation: Virda Field 87 metres (285 ft)

Administration
- Council area: Shetland Islands
- Country: Scotland
- Sovereign state: United Kingdom

Demographics
- Population: 7
- Population rank: 72=
- Population density: 0.85 people/km^{2}
- Largest settlement: Biggings

Papa Stour (Shaetlan pronunciation: [ˌpapəˈstuər] PA-pə-STOOR) is one of the Shetland Islands in Scotland, with a population of fifteen people, some of whom immigrated after an appeal for residents in the 1970s. Located to the west of mainland Shetland and with an area of 828 hectares (3.2 square miles), Papa Stour is the ninth largest island in Shetland. Erosion of the soft volcanic rocks by the sea has created an extraordinary variety of caves, stacks, arches, blowholes, and cliffs. The island and its surrounding seas harbour diverse populations of wildlife. The west side of the island is a Site of Special Scientific Interest and the seas around the island are a Special Area of Conservation.

The island has several Neolithic burial chamber sites, as well as the remains of Duke Hakon's 13th-century house dating from the Norse occupation of the island. The population reached 380 or more in the 19th century, when a fishing station was opened at Crabbaberry in West Voe. Subsequently, there was a steady decline in population.

Today the main settlement on the island is Biggings, just to the east of which is Housa Voe from where the Snolda ferry arrives from its base at West Burrafirth on the Shetland Mainland. Crofting, especially sheep rearing, is the mainstay of island life.

Numerous shipwrecks have occurred around the coast, and the celebrated poem Da Sang o da Papa Men by Vagaland recalls the drama of the days when Papa Stour was a centre for deep-sea fishing.

== Geography ==
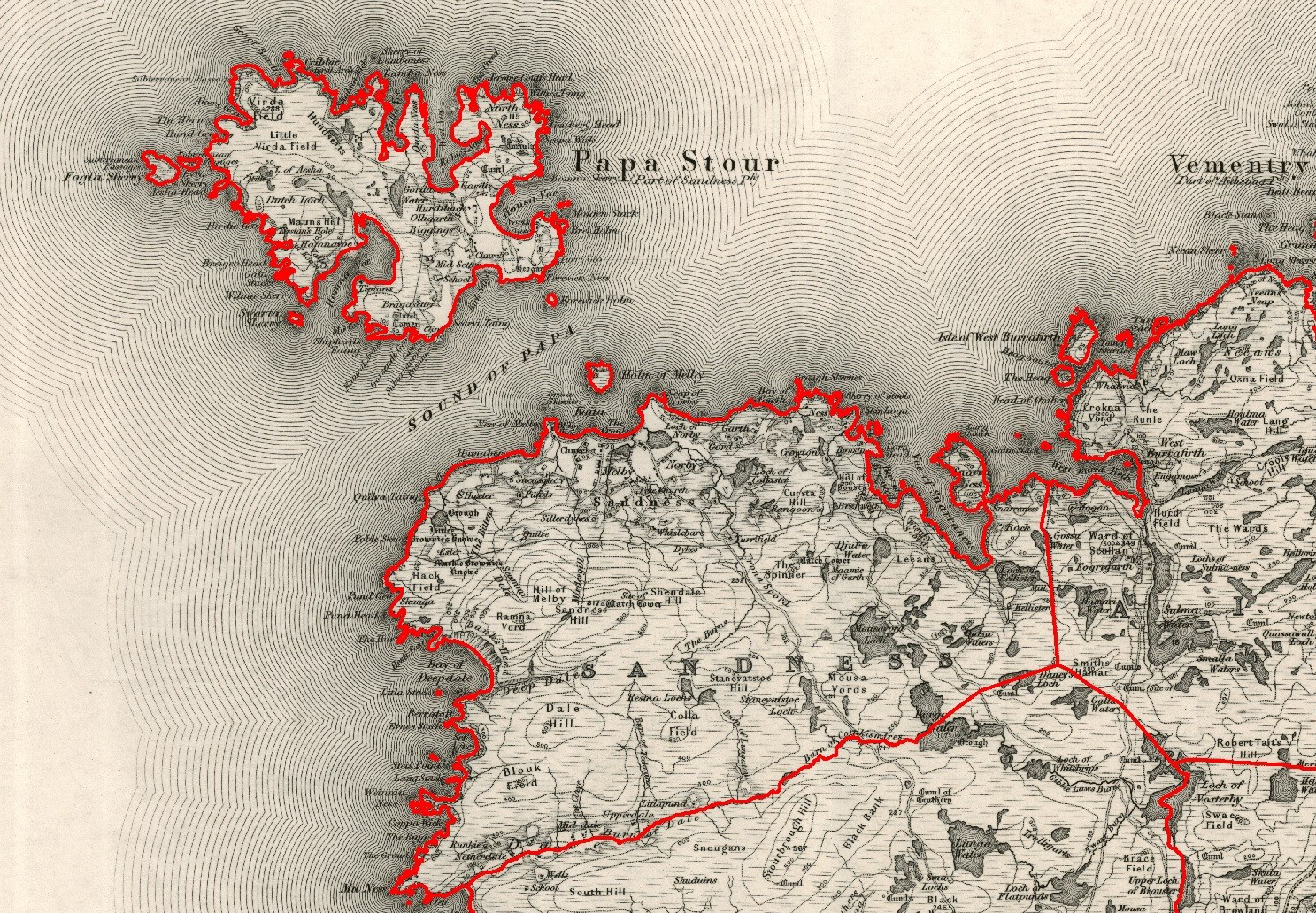
1878 Ordnance Survey map of Sandness Parish showing Papa Stour as part of the civil parish

Papa Stour is located at the south western end of St Magnus Bay. 34 kilometres (21 mi) of rugged coastline is indented by numerous small embayments and four larger 'voes'. Hamna Voe (Old Norse: 'harbour bay') in the south is the most sheltered anchorage and the surrounding cliffs contain a natural rock arch. Housa Voe to the east (Old Norse: 'house bay') is less secluded but is the main harbour for the island and the ferry's embarkation point.

Brei Holm and Maiden Stack guard the harbour entrance to the south. The former is a tidal island and was a leper colony until the 18th century (although it has been suggested that many of the "lepers" there were suffering from a vitamin deficiency rather than leprosy). The latter's name relates to a story from the 14th century. Lord Thorvald Thoresson is said to have constructed the tiny house at its top, whose ruins are still visible, to "preserve" his daughter from men. Unfortunately for his plans, when she left she was found to be pregnant; in another version of the story, she and her fisherman sweetheart successfully eloped. West Voe, the inner part of which is called 'Robies Noust' is the main voe in the north coast, the smaller Culla Voe lying immediately to the west.

The main settlement on the island today is Biggings, which overlooks Housa Voe and is surrounded by in-bye land to the east of the hill dyke (which runs south from West Voe). To the west the island is bisected by a belt of glacial moraine about 1.5 kilometres (0.93 mi) in length. Much of the rest of the area consists of a shallow stony soil that may be derived from glacial till. There is an almost complete absence of peat on the island and due to the volcanic rocks the soils are relatively fertile. The lack of peat led to 'turf scalping' for fuel and the bare areas of rock in the interior.

The highest point on the island is in the north west at Virda Field, which rises to 87 metres (285 feet). Virda is possibly from the Old Norse for 'heap of stones'.

=== List of outliers ===
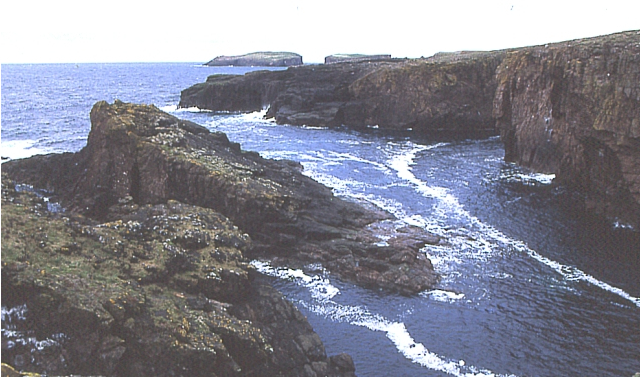
Galti Stacks on the west coast with Fogla Skerry (Old Norse: 'bird skerry') in the background

In addition to the larger islets mentioned above there are various other isles and skerries around the coast of Papa Stour. They include: Aesha Stack, Boinna Skerry, Borse Skerry, Fogla Skerry, Forewick Holm, Galti Stacks, Holm of Melby, Koda Skerry, Lyra Skerry, Skerries of Quidaness, Skerry of Lambaness, Sula Stack, Swat Skerry, The Horn, Tiptans Skerry and Wilma Skerry. The Ve Skerries lie 5 kilometres (3.1 mi) to the north west. They include: Helliogoblo, North Skerry, Ormal, Reaverack and The Clubb. In between Papa Stour and Ve Skerries lies the shallow bank of Papa-rof.

On 21 June 2008, Stuart Hill (AKA Captain Calamity) made a claim to the 1 hectare (2.5 acres) island of Forewick Holm (which he calls "Forvik Island"). On the basis of a marriage arrangement between King Christian of Norway and King James III of Scotland that dates to 1468, Hill argued that the island should be considered a British crown dependency, and thus not a part of the United Kingdom or of the European Union. This claim was not recognised by the United Kingdom.

== Geology ==
The island is composed of a variety of volcanic and sedimentary rock formations from the Devonian period. At that time the Scottish landmass formed part of the Old Red Sandstone Continent and lay some 10–25 degrees south of the equator. The accumulations of Old Red Sandstone, laid down from 408 to 370 million years ago, were created as earlier Silurian rocks, uplifted by the formation of Pangaea, eroded and then were deposited into river deltas. The freshwater Lake Orcadie existed on the edges of the eroding mountains, stretching from Shetland to the southern Moray Firth. The structure of Papa Stour is largely made up of ashes and lavas from volcanic activity associated with this period, including bands of solidified volcanic ash and lava (rhyolite), but there is also a Devonian fish bed at Lamba Banks. There are numerous large boulders deposited by Pleistocene glaciation.

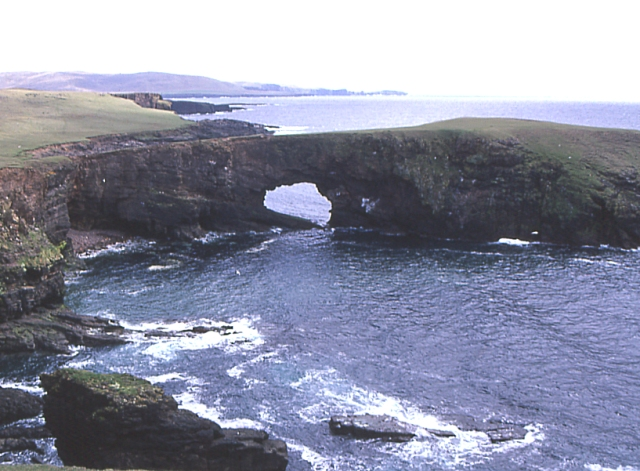
Aesha Head in the west

Erosion of the soft volcanic rocks by the sea has created an extraordinary variety of caves, stacks, arches, blowholes, cliffs, voes and geos that are among the finest in Britain. The 'Hol o' Bordie' is a cave that passes right through the north-west tip of the island. It is 300 metres (980 ft) long and wide enough to row through. Kirstan (or Christie's) Hole in the south west is another spectacular cave, part of the roof of which collapsed in 1981. Yet another is 'Francie's Hole' close to Hamna Voe in the west. This was the favourite of John Tudor who wrote of the island in his Victorian memoirs and described the cave as:

...in fairyland, so exquisite is the colouring of the roof and sides and so pellucid is the water... [with] alcoves or recesses like stalls in a church.

In 1953 the spectacular headland, 'Da Horn o Papa' fell into the sea during a storm. The nearby islet of Brei Holm also has caves that can be accessed by small boats when conditions permit.

== Ecology ==
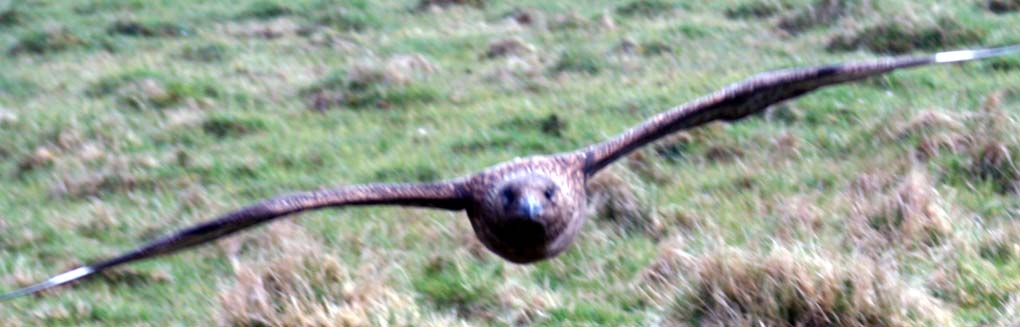
A bonxie or great skua, (Stercorarius skua) in flight

There is a profusion of wild flowers, including mountain everlasting, spring squill and eyebright as well as the ubiquitous heather. The west side of the island is a Site of Special Scientific Interest and the seas around Papa Stour are a Special Area of Conservation. The traditional Shetland Pony is still bred.

Otters, grey seals, killer whales and harbour porpoises are frequently seen on and around Papa Stour. Atlantic puffin, Arctic and common tern, bonxie and Arctic skua, northern fulmar, common guillemot, razorbill, curlew, wheatear, ringed plover and great black-backed gull all breed on the island, and numerous migratory species have been recorded. The northern and western parts of the island have been designated an Important Bird Area (IBA) by BirdLife International.

== History and archaeology ==
Human settlement of the island dates from circa 3000 BC and there are remains of several Neolithic burial chambers known as 'heel-shaped cairns'. Little is known of the pre-Celtic and Celtic eras, but when the Norse arrived it is likely they found a religious settlement as the name of the island derives from Papey Stóra meaning "Big island of the Papar" (Celtic monks), in distinction to Papa Little some 12 kilometres (7.5 mi) to the west.

=== Norse period ===
Papa Stour is the subject of a 1299 manuscript written in Old Norse, which is the oldest surviving document from Shetland. It deals with a dramatic incident in the house of Duke Hakon Magnusson, who was later to become King Hakon V of Norway. There is a circle of stones near the beach at Housa Voe, which are the remains of a 'ting', or local assembly. This was the scene of a duel, fought and won by Lord Thorvald Thoresson, who was accused of corruption in the 1299 document and was later called 'dominus de Papay'. (The story of his unfortunate daughter is referred to above.) The remains of Duke Hakon's 13th-century house are still visible near Housa Voe.

=== Scots rule and fishing ===
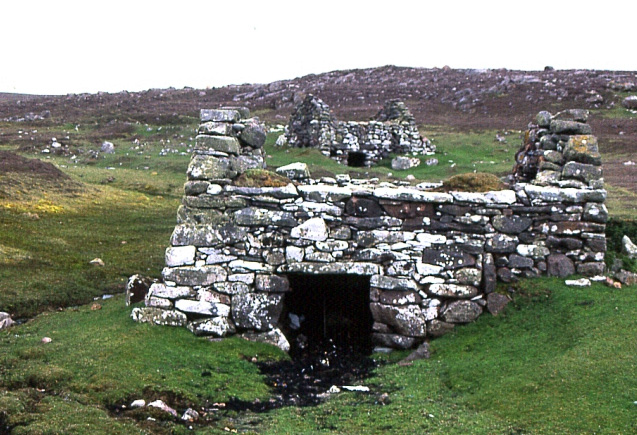
Water mills near Dutch Loch

In 1469 Shetland came under nominal Scottish control, although the Norse 'Lairds of Norway' kept their Papa Stour estates until the 17th century. In the 16th century merchants from Bremen and Hamburg were operating a summer trading booth to buy fish from the local fleet. By the 18th century, two Scottish lairds, Thomas Gifford of Busta, and Arthur Nicolson of Lerwick, owned the island. They maintained a prosperous Haaf (Old Norse: 'deep sea') fishing industry, undertaken in the summer months using six-oared boats known as sixareens.

In addition to the leper colony on Brei Holm there may have been another at Hilla Fielle overlooking Hamna Voe. A recent archaeological survey was inconclusive but suggests the site may be much older than the supposed 18th-century colony.

The island church, which overlooks Kirk Sand in the bay of Fore Wick, was founded in 1806. 300 metres (980 ft) from the present church there may be an older chapel site of Sneeans or Snøyans on the headland between the west end of Kirk Sand and the bay of Tusselby. It is called the 'ald kirk' by locals and referred to by the Ordnance Survey as "the site of a Romish chapel belonging to about the twelfth century". There is a tradition that the work there was interfered with by supernatural powers and that each day's work on the building was destroyed during the night. Eventually the cornerstones were moved overnight by these unearthly agencies to the present site of the church and work was re-commenced there successfully. Excavations in 2004 found little besides large blocks of rhyolite and a piece of whalebone rib, suggesting that the oral tradition may have some truth to it.

In the 19th century the Crabbaberry fishing station in West Voe was opened and the island had a population of 360 people or more. However, fuel shortages and a decline in fishing due to the introduction of steam drifters saw a fall in population from the 1870s on. At this time another duel entered the history of Papa Stour. Edwin Lindsay, an Indian army officer and the son of the 6th Earl of Balcarres, was declared insane and sent to the island in disgrace after refusing to fight in one. He spent 26 years as a prisoner before the Quaker preacher Catherine Watson arranged for his release in 1835. Lindsay's Well is a spring at the south of the island where he was allowed to bathe.

There are good examples of horizontal water mills, also known as Norse or Clack Mills, around Dutch Loch. Originally these were two-storey buildings with turf roofs, built into banks to give access to the upper floor where the millstone was sited. Inside the building there was a fixed lower millstone, and a rotating upper millstone driven by the water falling onto the paddles below. Some were still in use on Papa Stour in the early years of the 20th century, and there is still a working example of one of these mills on the Burn of Clumlie, at Troswick in the south Mainland of Shetland.

=== 20th and 21st centuries ===
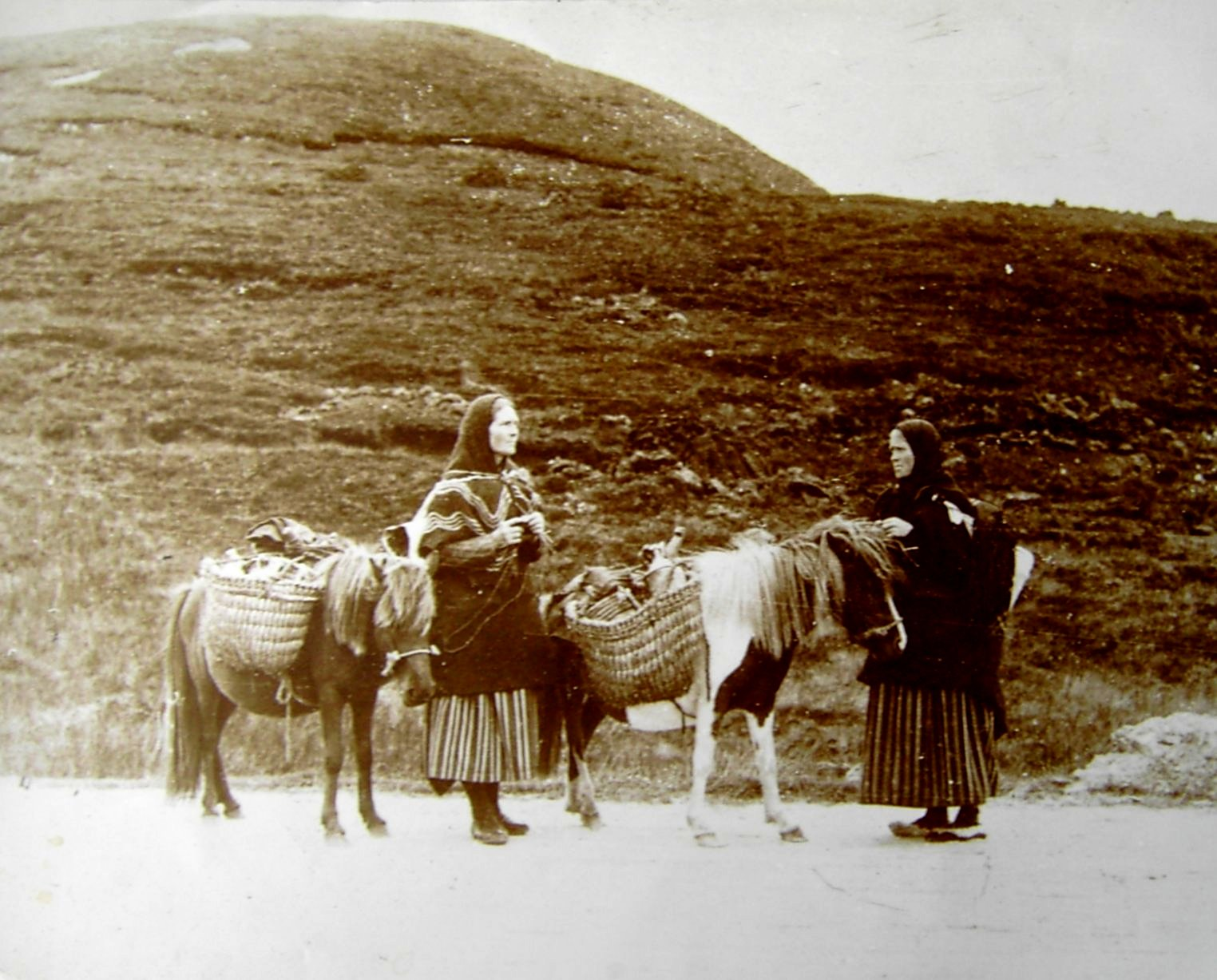
Shetland women and ponies circa 1900

In common with many small Scottish islands, Papa Stour's population peaked in the 19th century and has experienced a significant decline since then (see e.g. Mingulay). By 1970 the island school had closed and the population had declined to sixteen 'fairly elderly' residents, but an advertisement in Exchange and Mart reversed the decline. A croft and five sheep were offered free of charge to incomers which brought a flood of applicants. By 1981 the census recorded a population of 33. However, by 2005 the population had fallen to 20 after serious discord between islanders led to several court cases. A number of people left the island and the school closed. By early 2008 the population had dropped to just nine after a family of seven left. The 2011 census recorded a usually resident population of 15 – during the decade 2001–2011 Scottish island populations as a whole grew by 4% to 103,702.

Overview of population trends

1841	1871	1881	1891	1931	1961	1981	1991	2001	2011	2022
382	351	254	244	100	55	33	33	23	15	7

=== Shipwrecks ===
The coasts around Papa Stour have claimed numerous wrecks. In Hamnavoe, Tiptans Skerry alone has sunk Dutch, French, German and Norwegian ships.

The Aberdeen trawler Ben Doran A178, foundered on the Ve Skerries 3 miles northwest of Papa Stour, on the evening of 28 March 1930 while on her way to the village of Scalloway to land her catch. When she grounded weather conditions were fairly good but it was not until the following day that a passing trawler saw, and reported the wreck. By the time that various rescue attempts were launched by the coastguard and local volunteers (there being no lifeboat in Shetland at that time), weather conditions had deteriorated to the point where it was impossible to approach the skerries. A request had been made for the Stromness lifeboat from Orkney, only 120 miles away, to launch, but the request was made too late to be of help. All 9 crew perished in the wreck. Only 3 bodies were recovered, that of James Mitchell, which was returned to Aberdeen, and the bodies of J. Cormack and J.R. Insh, which were buried in Scalloway.

The cargo ship SS Highcliffe ran aground in fog on Forewick Holm in February 1940. On this occasion the conditions were clement and only the ship and cargo were lost. In 1967 the Aberdeen trawler Juniper ran aground in Lyra Sound at the bottom of the 60 metres (200 feet) cliffs. The 12-man crew were rescued by the Aith lifeboat, the coxswain being awarded the RNLI silver medal for this rescue.

Another shipwreck occurred on 9 December 1977 when the Aberdeen trawler Elinor Viking A278, skipper Alec Flett, foundered on the Ve Skerries. The Aith Lifeboat came to the scene but was unable to get near enough to rescue the crew because of the sea conditions. At the request of Alec Webster, Coastguard Station Officer, Lerwick, a volunteer crew in a British Airways Sikorsky S61N helicopter from Sumburgh Airport was scrambled. They managed to winch all the boat's crew to safety within hours of the grounding, despite the storm force winds. The helicopter crew later received a number of awards for bravery. There was no loss of life, but this incident prompted the building of a lighthouse on the skerries in 1979, and may also have been the example required for the formation of the present Search and Rescue helicopter unit, based at Sumburgh Airport.

== Economy and transport ==
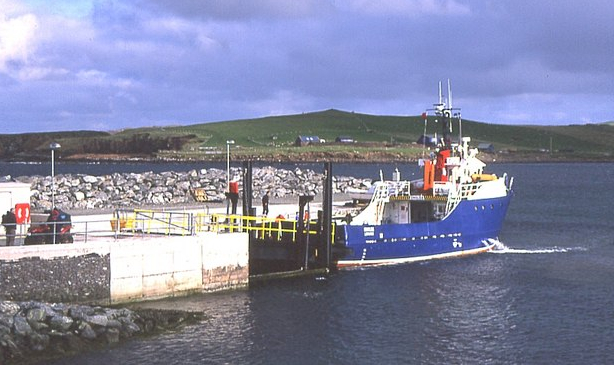
Papa Stour pier and ferry

Crofting is the mainstay of island life. Sheep form the backbone of the agricultural economy but a diversity livestock are kept, including cattle, pigs, goats, chickens, ducks and geese. Vegetable are grown too, often in the shelter of circular walls, such plots being known as 'planti crubs' – these were originally used to propagate kale (cabbage) seedlings and were built well away from other buildings where they would be safe from mice. The seedlings would then be transplanted to kaleyards (gardens) near the houses. Fishing is still conducted but on a relatively small scale. There is a post office at the pier, but no shop. Mains electricity only came to the island at the close of the 20th century. The Papa Stour Project is a Christian supported housing service offering accommodation to men with drug and alcohol issues. Ferries now sail across the Sound of Papa to West Burrafirth on the Shetland Mainland. The crossing takes 45 minutes, and although the Snolda carries cars, there is only one short road on the island. For visiting yachts the four main voes provide good shelter, but the strong tides in both the Sound of Papa and to the north west require considerable care.

== Culture and the arts ==
The Papa Stour sword dance may be of Norse origin and bears similarities to the long sword dance of the north east of England. A description of the dance appears in The Pirate by Sir Walter Scott.

The writer and journalist John Sands lived on Papa Stour and Foula for a while during the late 19th century. The writer, folklorist and musician, George P. S. Peterson was brought up on Papa Stour.

It is also the 'Papa' of Vagaland's poem Da Sang o da Papa men, now adopted as part of the folksong tradition, as set to music by T.M.Y. Manson. The insistent chorus chant, 'Rowin Foula Doon!', is particularly striking.

"Oot bewast da Horn o Papa,
Rowin Foula doon!
Owir a hidden piece o water,
Rowin Foula doon!
Roond da boat da tide-lumps makkin,
Sunlicht trowe da cloods is brakkin;
We maan geng whaar fish is takkin,
Rowin Foula doon!"

"Rowin Foula doon!" refers to the fishermens' practice of rowing their open fishing boat out to sea until the high cliffs of Foula were no longer visible. This entailed the boat being some 96 kilometres (60 mi) west of Papa Stour. The 'tide-lumps' are increased swells of unusual size due to the combined action of wind against tide. The resonant final image of the piece is of the fishermen being led back home to Papa by the 'scent o flooers' across the water. This is an example of Vagaland's ability to create a vivid sensual impression of a situation. An extra layer of meaning is added by the knowledge that Da Horn o Papa collapsed in a storm around the time of this poem's composition, so that it is a tribute not just to a lost way of life, but a noted geographical feature.

== See also ==
- List of islands of Scotland
- List of Shetland islands
- Rachel Chiesley, Lady Grange who was held captive on St Kilda.
- Papa, Scotland
