= Stuart Hill =

Stuart Hill may refer to:

- Stuart Hill (author), English author of The Icemark Chronicles series of books
- Stuart Hill (sailor), English amateur sailor, jurist and activist in the Shetland Islands independence movement
- Stuart Hill (animator), the co-creator of Cartoon Network's Sunday Pants.
