= Captain Calamity =

Captain Calamity may refer to:

- Captain Calamity (film), a 1936 film starring George F. Houston
- Captain Calamity, a villain in the DC Comics universe
- Stuart Hill (sailor) (born 1943), nicknamed "Captain Calamity"
