= Harriet Leisk =

Shetland suffragist and supporter of Scottish Women's Hospitals for Foreign Service

Harriet Atherton Leisk
- Born: Harriet Ann Atherton; 10 August 1853; Liverpool, England
- Died: 3 July 1921 (aged 67); Gilbert Bain Hospital, Lerwick, Scotland
- Occupation: Suffragist
- Organization(s): Shetland Women's Suffrage Society, Emergency Helpers
- Spouse: John Leisk (m. 1874)
- Children: 5 daughters

Harriet Atherton Leisk (10 August 1853 – 3 July 1921) was a Shetland suffragist, who played a leading role in the Shetland Women's Suffrage Society. During the World War I, she was instrumental in organising the 'Emergency Helpers', who carried out voluntary war work and fundraised for the Scottish Women's Hospital at Royaumont.

== Personal life ==
Harriet Atherton was born in Liverpool on 10 August 1853, the daughter of William and Harriet Goulborn Atherton. She married John Leisk, a draper from Shetland, in 1874. The couple had five daughters: Ann (b.1875), Harriet Goulborn (b. 1877), Ethel Elizabeth (b.1879), Margaret Louisa (b.1881), and Alice Lyall (b.1886). John Leisk was Provost of Lerwick 1895–1904.

Harriet Leisk had an important social role in Shetland society. She was a member of the Church of Scotland, the Dorcas Society, the Shetland Literary and Scientific Society, the Lerwick Nursing Association, the Queen Victoria Jubilee Nursing Society, and she was Secretary of the Coal Fund which provided coal to the poor.

Two of Harriet's sisters, Elizabeth and Sarah, also married and moved to Shetland. All three were involved in the Shetland Women's Suffrage Society, along with Harriet's youngest daughter, Alice, who was the Treasurer, and Harriet's niece Elizabeth.

== Suffrage activism and war work ==
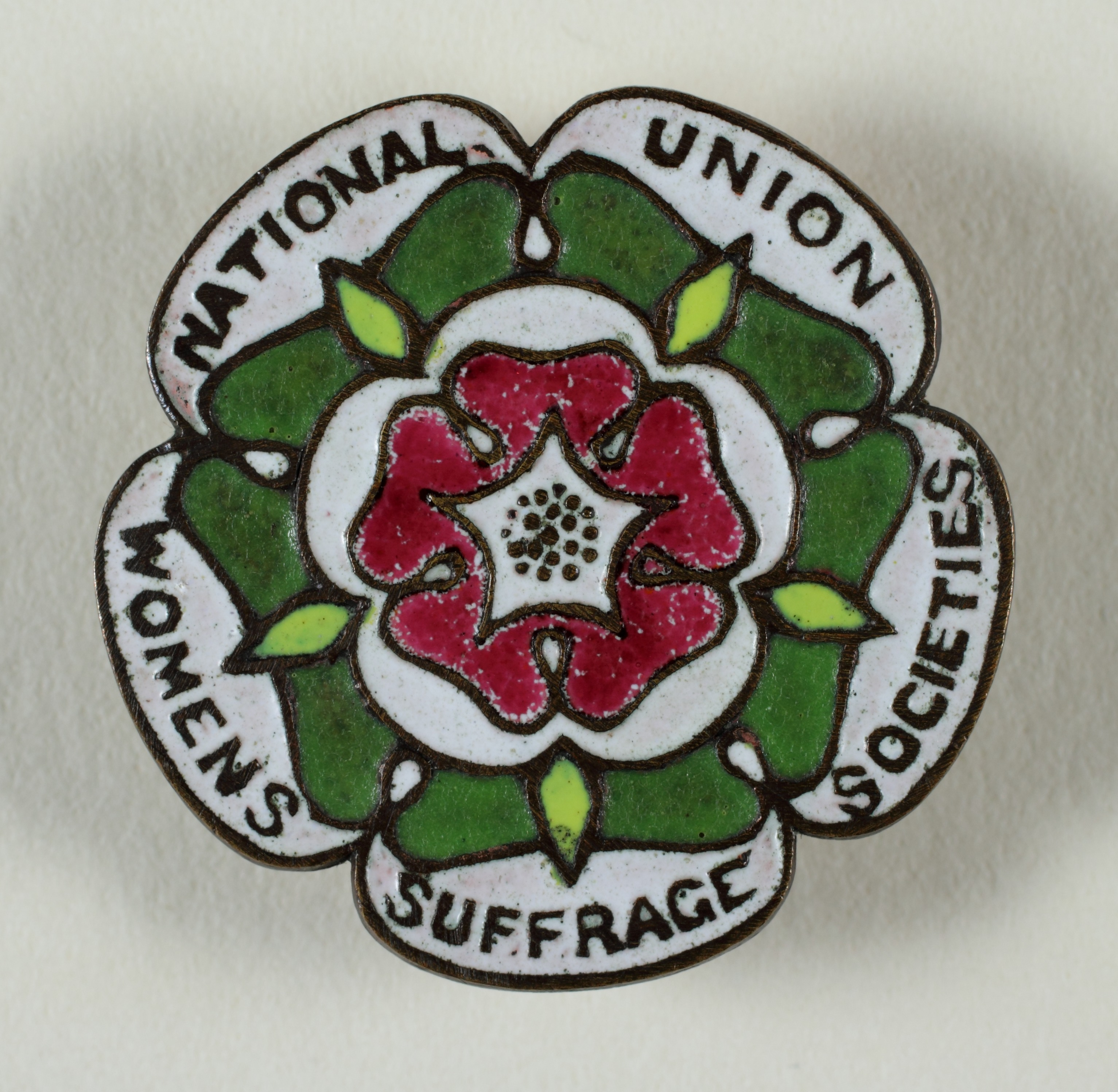
Badge of the National Union of Women's Suffrage Societies (NUWSS)

From 1909, Harriet Leisk was Chairman of the Shetland Women's Suffrage Society, which had been formed that year at the home of Christina Jamieson. The society was affiliated to the National Union of Women's Suffrage Societies, and worked for the vote through public meetings, leafleting, and letters to the local press. This more moderate approach seemed to garner favour within the Shetland Isles, with Shetland appearing to have been generally in support of giving women the vote. In 1912, in a letter to the Shetland News, a male correspondent wrote:

The local suffragists have been doing a lot of quiet, but very effective work... they have in many unobtrusive ways brought their views before others and have succeeded in securing many supporters.’ They would continue to reject militancy for the length of their campaign.

One argument put forward by the Shetland women was that, given the frequent absence of seamen abroad - and their subsequent inability to cast votes - to give women the vote would mean that the wives and relatives of these men could, according to Jamieson, 'bring pressure on legislation affecting the wages, safety, and lives of seaman'.

Following the outbreak of the First World War, the Shetland Women's Suffrage Society established the Emergency Helpers, with Leisk acting as convenor. The Helpers' efforts focused largely on preparing themselves in case of casualties, including through the gathering and creation of supplies (such as surgical dressings and blankets), and through the provision of nursing training and first aid classes. The Emergency Helpers also fundraised for the Scottish Women's Hospital at Royaumont, contributing £204.12 over the course of the war for the hospital's 'Lerwick Bed'. They operated throughout the war, only winding up in May 1919.

== Death and legacy ==
Leisk died on 3 July 1921 in the Gilbert Bain Hospital, Lerwick.

In 2021, Leisk was one of a collection of Scottish suffragists celebrated in a deck of cards distributed as part of an education pack to 100 schools around the country.
