= Melby, Shetland =

Melby
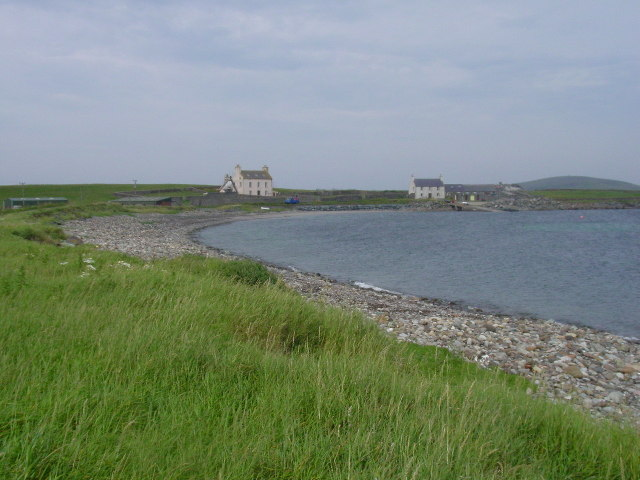
- Looking towards Melby.

- Location within Shetland
- Area: 0.03 km^{2} (0.012 sq mi)
- Council area: Shetland Islands
- Country: Scotland
- Sovereign state: United Kingdom
- Police: Scotland
- Fire: Scottish
- Ambulance: Scottish

Melby is a small coastal hamlet on Mainland, Shetland Islands, Scotland, United Kingdom; the nearest settlement is Sandness.

The islet of Holm of Melby lies just offshore.

== Gallery ==
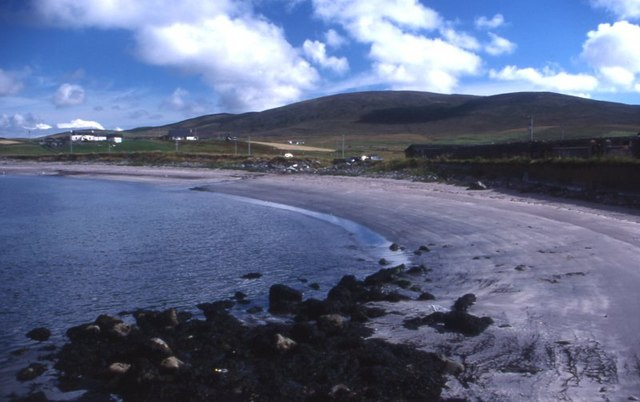

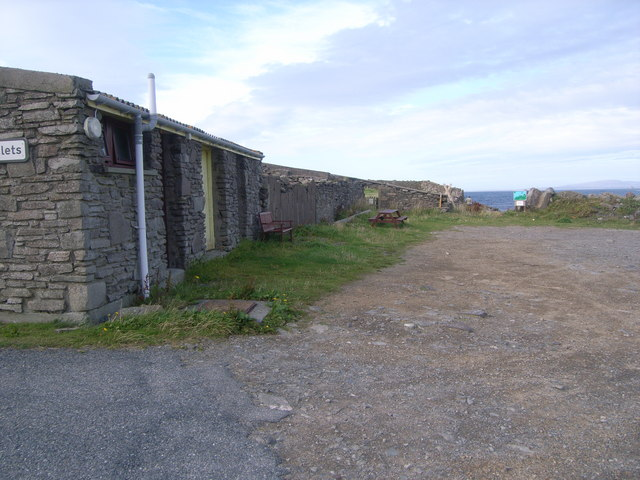

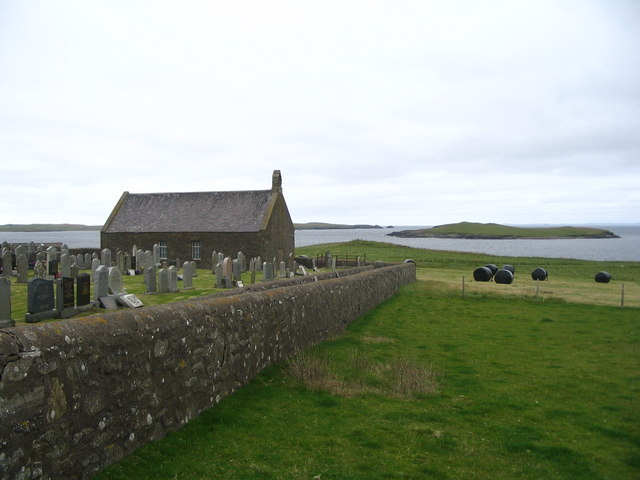

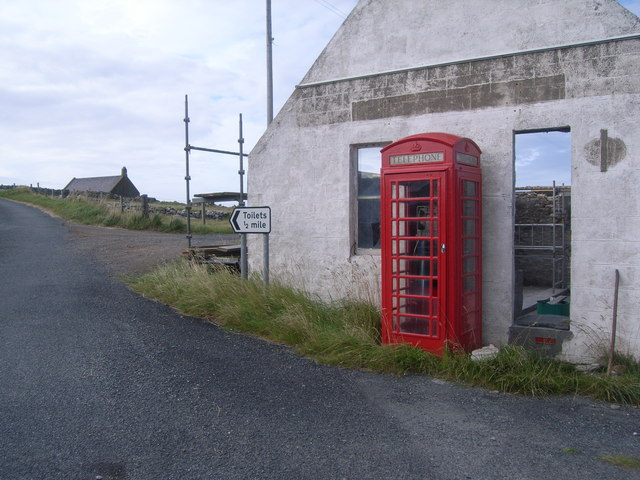
