= Brei Holm =

Tiny tidal islet in the western Shetland Islands

Coordinates: 60°19′39″N 1°39′28″W

Brei Holm is a tiny tidal islet in the western Shetland Islands. It is due east of Papa Stour, to which it is connected at low tide, just outside Housa Voe. It is about a mile off Mainland, Shetland, and not far from the Maiden Stack.

It was a leper colony until the 18th century, but it has been suggested that many of the "lepers" there were suffering from a vitamin deficiency and not from leprosy at all.
