= Robert Alan Jamieson =

Scottish poet and novelist

Robert Alan Jamieson (born 1958) is a poet and novelist from Shetland, Scotland. He grew up in the crofting community of Sandness. He works as a creative writing tutor at Edinburgh University, having been co-editor of the Edinburgh Review in 1993–1998 and a creative writing fellow at the Universities of Glasgow and Strathclyde in 1998–2001.

== Novels ==
- Soor Hearts (1984)
- Thin Wealth (1986)
- A Day at the Office (1991), named by Edinburgh-based List Magazine among the 100 Best Scottish Books of All Time: "Each page of this book – a precursor to much modern experimental Scottish fiction – looks more like a work of art than a novel."
- Da Happie Laand (2010)
- MacCloud Falls (2017)

== Poetry ==
Jamieson writes in the Shetland dialect of Scots. Some of his works are:

- Shoormal (1986)
- Nort Atlantik Drift (1999), reprinted in a bilingual edition in 2007. Includes "Laamint fir da tristie", which was selected as a poem of the week at The Scotsman in June 2008.
- Ansin t'Sjaetlin: some responses to the language question (2005)
- Plague Clothes (2020)

== Theatre ==
- An Aald Lion Lies Doon (1986)
- Beyond the Far Haaf (1989), Libretto for a symphonic cantata, music by David Ward.)

== Anthologies ==
- (Contributor) Pax Edina: The One O' Clock Gun Anthology (Edinburgh, 2010)

== See also ==
- Shetland dialect
