= Jessie Craigen =

British working-class activist (c. 1835–1899)

- Born: Jessie Hannah Craigen c. 1835
- Died: 5 October 1899 (aged 63–64); Ilford
- Monuments: Statue of Millicent Fawcett
- Occupations: Activist and public speaker
- Years active: 1850s-1890s
- Political party: Women's Liberal Association

Jessie Hannah Craigen (c. 1835 – 5 October 1899), was a British working-class suffrage speaker in a movement which was predominantly made up of middle and upper-class activists. She was also a freelance (or "paid agent") speaker in the campaigns for Irish Home Rule and the cooperative movement and against vivisection, compulsory vaccination, and the Contagious Diseases Acts.

== Early life ==
It is not certain where in the UK she was born, although the Dover Express in 1866 described her as a 'Scotch lady'. The 1871 census, however, shows her living with an adopted 18-year-old child, Rosetta Vincent, and a married sister, Emma Henley, in Ordsall near Retford and describing herself as a ‘lecturer’, born in London. By 1881 she is in Clifton, Bristol, and in the census she describes herself as a London-born, ‘Lecturer on Social Subjects’.

She reportedly had a seafaring father from the Scottish Highlands, who died when she was an infant, and a mother who was an Italian actress. As a child she appeared on the stage and this may have given her the skills and the confidence for paid public speaking. She began in the late 1850s giving readings from plays and recitations, before moving onto delivering orations at temperance meetings, and was described on one such occasion in 1861 as a "clever Quakeress." By December 1868, she was addressing suffrage meetings. A newspaper reporter wrote in 1869 at Alnwick that her talks were well attended, but added that this was because a lady lecturer was a novelty, recalling Dr Johnson's comments on the subject, "…a woman's preaching is like a dog's walking on his hind legs. It is not done well; but you are surprised to find it done at all."

== As a suffragist ==
She is recorded as speaking on behalf of women's rights between 1868 and 1884. Her main supporters were the radical suffragists Priscilla Bright McLaren, Lilias Ashworth Hallett and the Quaker sisters Anna Maria and Mary Priestman, who had realised the necessity of gaining support from the working classes for the suffrage movement. The feminist and campaigner for women's rights, Helen Blackburn called her ‘that strange erratic genius’ who spoke with a tone like a 'mighty melodious bell'. Blackburn noted that she planned and carried out her tours by herself, travelling all over the kingdom from John O'Groats to Lands End, accompanied only by her little dog, and that, with the power of her voice, she was able to gather audiences and hold them riveted, ‘from miners in Northumberland… and fishers in Cornwall... to agricultural labourers in the market-places of country towns’. Craigen also visited Stornoway in the Scottish Hebrides, the writer and politician Henry Hyndman wrote vividly of her:

Jessie Craigen was ugly, self-taught, roughly attired, and uncouth in her ways.Yet all this was soon overlooked when once the lady began to speak...She came forward, dumped down on the table in front of me an umbrella, a neck wrapper, and a shabby old bag.Then she turned round to face the audience. She was greeted with boisterous peals of laughter. No wonder! Such a figure of fun you never saw. It was Mrs. Gamp come again in the flesh – umbrella, corkscrew curls and all. There she stood with a battered bonnet on her straggling grey hair, with a rough shawl pinned over her shoulders, displaying a powerful and strongly marked and somewhat bibulous physiognomy, with a body of portly development and as broad as it was long...In two minutes the whole audience was listening intently; within five she had them in fits of laughter, this time not at her but with her. A little later tears were in every eye as she told some terribly touching story of domestic suffering, self-sacrifice, and misery. So it went on. This ungainly person was producing more effect than all the rest of the speakers put together.

By 1879 she was appearing on platforms with the principal figures of the suffrage movement and at Manchester, in October of that year, Helen Blackburn said that she "held the meeting enchained by her grand voice and her strong and witty words, delivered with practised power." On 3 February 1880 she spoke at the "Great Demonstration of Women" in Manchester's Free Trade Hall, alongside such notables as Mrs McClaren, Lydia Becker and Josephine Butler.

In 1881-2 she may have formed a romantic friendship with the feminist and suffragist Helen Taylor, a woman from a very different social background. This relationship faced challenges, since class differences in late-Victorian England meant that women like Craigen, who took payment for their suffrage work, were likely to be regarded on the same terms as personal servants by the middle-class leadership of the movement. However, this friendship actually faded, to Craigen's great regret, over differences of opinion concerning Ireland and Charles Stewart Parnell, who was often a houseguest of Miss Taylor.

As the suffrage movement split, after its failure to win any measure for women's right to vote under the Third Reform Act of December 1884, Craigen's position, as a paid agent speaker, became more difficult and she gradually faded from the women's rights scene. (Interestingly, Leah Leneman suggests that 'she had no payment in the movement but collected minimum expenses to keep her going') She continued to protest on behalf of other causes however, contributing an article to the Nineteenth Century Review against proposals to build a Channel Tunnel, and when speaking at an anti-vivisection, anti-vaccination demonstration in Chelsea, in April 1894, she was described as "a stout, elderly lady of dark complexion, with a stubby beard and a strong moustache…"

== Later life and death ==
The Local Government Act 1894 had created a system of urban and rural district councils, and had permitted women to be councillors. In December 1894, Jessie Craigen stood, as the only woman candidate, in the election for Ilford Urban District Council, on behalf of the Women's Liberal Association. She was unsuccessful, coming fourteenth out of seventeen candidates.

She died in her lodgings 2, Grove-villas, Ilford Lane, Ilford, Essex on 5 October 1899 when local newspapers described her as a ‘well-known old maiden lady’ and ‘miser’, who had shared her house with fifteen dogs. Her obituary in the Zoophilist declared that 'as a woman of the people, she exercised a great influence over the working classes... We shall miss her courageous and outspoken advocacy... her racy and eloquent speeches'. Her belongings were left to Rosetta Blanche Vincent, spinster, of Church House, Uckfield, Sussex, who was granted probate on the will as sole executrix.

== Posthumous recognition ==
Her name but no picture as there is no known photograph or drawing of her, (and those of 58 other women's suffrage supporters) are on the plinth of the statue of Millicent Fawcett in Parliament Square, London, unveiled in 2018.

== See also ==
- Selina Cooper, working class suffragist.
- Annie Kenney, working class suffragist.
- Dora Thewlis, working class suffragist.
- Women's suffrage in the United Kingdom
- Representation of the People Act 1918
- Representation of the People Act 1928
