= E. S. Reid Tait =

Scottish draper and antiquarian, 1885–1960

Edwyn Seymour Reid Tait (1885 – 6 November 1960) was a Scottish draper and antiquarian who specialised in the folklore of the Shetland Islands. His collection of books, newspaper clippings and other material relating to the islands are held at the Shetland Museum and Archives.

== Selected publications ==
- Statistical account of Shetland, 1791-1799, drawn up from the communications of the ministers of the different parishes by Sir John Sinclair. [Extracts from The statistical account of Scotland.] 1925
- Hjaltland Miscellany vols 1–5, compiled and edited, sometimes with Christina Jamieson, 1934 etc.
- Pioneers of the temperance movement in Lerwick: being an address delivered by E.S.R. Tait at the celebration of the 25th anniversary of the opening of the Rechabite Hall, Lerwick, April 5, 1922, 1923
- Shetland Folk Book Vol. 1, co-edited with Thomas A. Robertson and John J. Graham, Shetland Folk Society 1947
- Two translations from the Dano-Norwegian: I. About contacts between the Orkneys and Shetland and the Motherland Norway after 1468 (Dr. Daae's treatise). II. The letters of Jakob Jakobsen, D.Ph., to Gilbert Goudie, F.S.A. Scot. 1953
- Lerwick Miscellany, 1955
