= Forewick Holm =

Island in western Shetland, Scotland

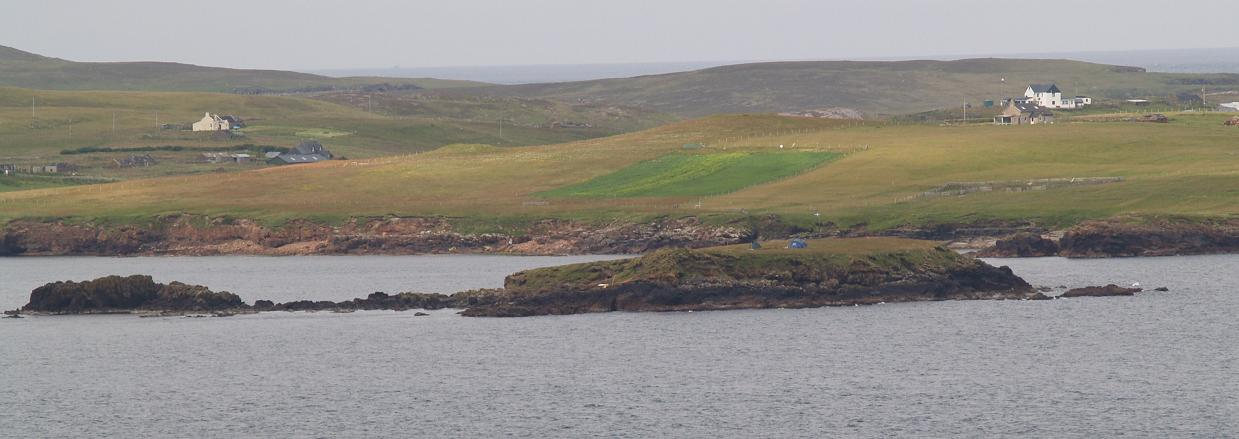
- View of the islet from Sandness with Papa Stour in the background

Location
- Location within Shetland
- OS grid reference: HU 18677 59494
- Coordinates: 60°19′09″N 1°39′49″W

Physical geography
- Island group: Shetland
- Area: 1 hectare (2.5 acres)
- Area rank: na
- Highest elevation: 10 metres (33 ft)

Administration
- Council area: Shetland
- Country: Scotland
- Sovereign state: United Kingdom

Demographics
- Population: 0

Forewick Holm is a 1-hectare (2.5-acre) island in the Sound of Papa, between Papa Stour and the Mainland of Shetland. It lies adjacent to a skerry called Scarf's Head, and the two are connected at low tide. Forewick Holm has gained notoriety through its association with Stuart "Captain Calamity" Hill, who claims that the island is a sovereign micronation named "Forvik". The Forvik project's stated purpose is to show Shetlanders what they could achieve if they asserted their legal rights and seceded from the United Kingdom.

== History ==
The SS Highcliffe was wrecked on the island on 6 February 1940. It was carrying a cargo of iron ore from Narvik, bound for Immingham.

== Forvik ==
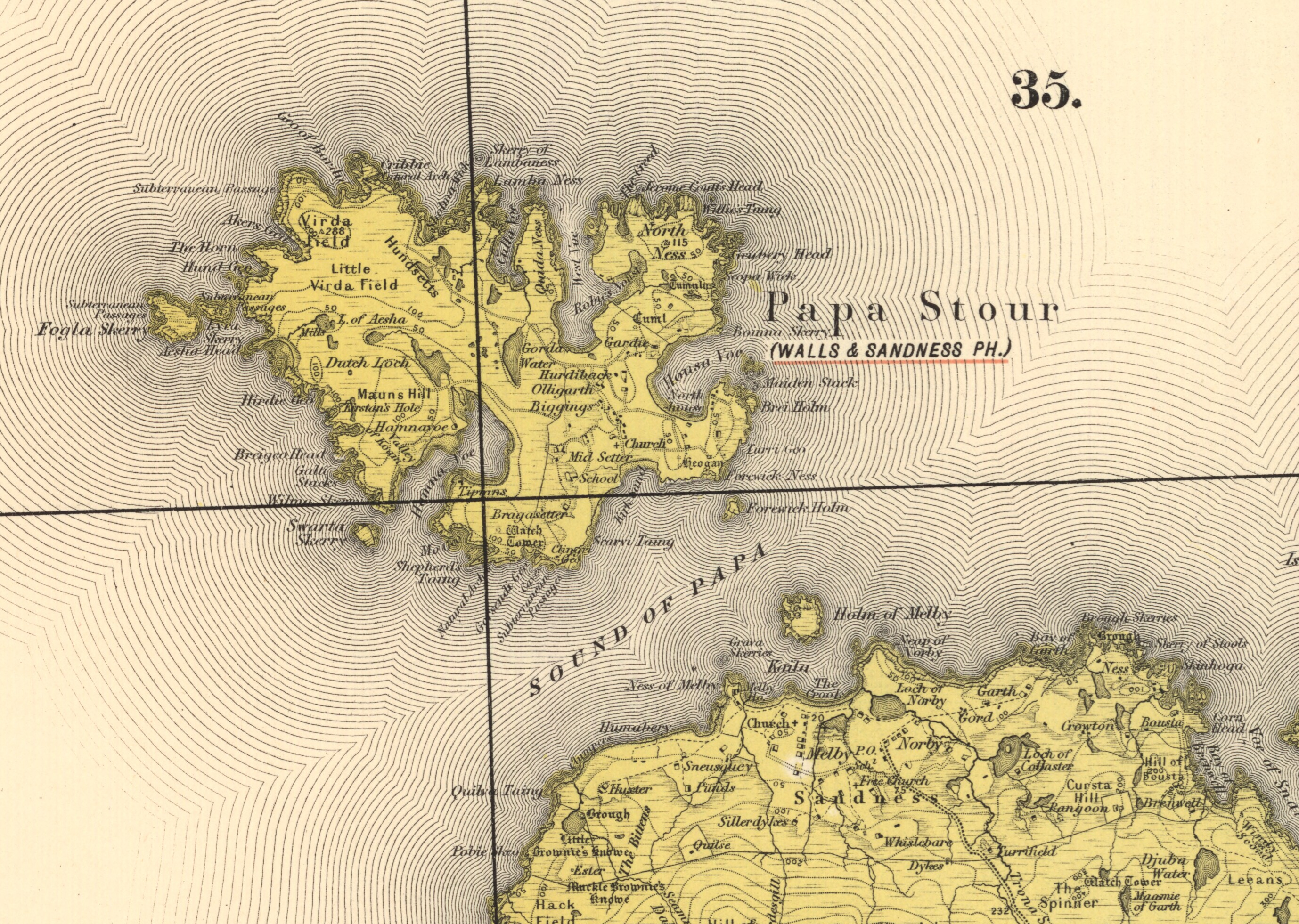
Map of Papa Stour, showing Forewick Holm to the southeast

In 2001, Stuart Hill, a native of Essex, shipwrecked on the island during a failed attempt to circumnavigate the British Isles, earning him the nickname "Captain Calamity". He subsequently settled in Shetland and became an advocate for the islands' independence. His attempts did not degree any sizable public interest. Hill argues that Shetland was never formally ceded to Scotland or Great Britain, making the British government's exercise of sovereignty over the islands illegal. In order to draw attention to his cause, he acquired the islet of Forewick Holm and, on 21 June 2008, declared it to be an autonomous Crown dependency known as "Forvik". The declaration invited Shetlanders to add their own properties to the dependency in order to create a new federation "free of liars, thieves and tyrants in government". On 23 February 2011, Hill issued a further declaration stating that Forvik had severed its ties to the Crown and become a fully independent state known as the "Sovereign State of Forvik".

Hill's right to Forewick Holm has been contested by Mark King, the island's original owner. Hill claims to have a signed, witnessed document confirming King's intention to donate the island to him, but King says that he signed this during a manic episode and that the land registry still lists him as the owner.

In 2008, Hill began working on an "official residence" on the island, its first permanent structure. He also laid claim to the surrounding seabed and invited companies to bid for oil exploration rights. "Citizenships" were made available for purchase, costing between one and five Forvik guldens (i.e. £60 to £360). Membership was later set at £20 per annum, and in 2015 Hill claimed there were 218 members.

Hill travelled to and from the island on a flat-bottomed plywood boat of his own creation. In September 2008, he had to be rescued by a Coastguard helicopter and RNLI lifeboat after his vessel began to sink. His boat was described as "ramshackle" and a "floating wardrobe", and his rescuers criticised him for having no lifejacket or radio aboard.

Hill has refused to pay road tax or insurance to the British government, instead creating documents issued by Forvik. In 2011, he was found guilty of driving offences arising from this.
