= Christina Jamieson =

British writer, playwright and suffragist (1864–1942)

- Jamieson in a Shetland jumper
- Born: 30 June 1864; Sandness, Shetland, Scotland
- Died: 23 March 1942 (aged 77); Nelson, New Zealand
- Occupation: Writer
- Writing career
- Pen name: John Cranston
- Literary movement: suffragism, folklore

Christina Jamieson (1864–1942) was a Scottish writer, playwright and suffragist known for her association with Shetland.

== Early life ==
Jamieson was born to Robert and Barbara Laing on 30 June 1864 at Cruisdale, Sandness on Mainland, Shetland. Her father was a schoolmaster in Sandness and she attended his school. She had six siblings. She and her mother Barbara moved to the capital of Shetland, Lerwick, after her father died in 1899. Three of her brothers became doctors.

== Activism ==
=== Suffrage ===
Jamieson is known for founding the non-militant Shetland Women's Suffrage Society in her home during October 1909, which became associated with the National Union of Women's Suffrage Societies (NUWSS), and for leading the society. Despite living hundreds of miles away from London, she created a banner with Orkney artist Stanley Cursiter which she carried in national processions. These included the Women's Coronation Procession on 21 June 1911, with a Miss Courtenay (who was the niece of the Orcadian Women's Suffrage Society chair Mary Anne Baikie). Jamieson also engaged in letter-writing regularly on suffrage to the local press, pamphleting campaigns and argued that as fishermen were absentee voters that their wives should have the right to vote in their stead.

Jamieson held left-wing views which she shared with her nephew, Bertie Jamieson, and published a short book on the women's suffrage movement called Sketch of votes for women movement.

=== Shetland history ===
Alongside her suffragist campaigning, Jamieson wrote both fictional and factual items about Shetland and women's roles in society, sometimes under the pseudonym John Cranston. In 1910 she wrote for The Shetland Times about the economic and emotional issues facing local women. She wrote about how Shetland women "adored" their menfolk and that worrying about men being lost at sea was "a subcurrent of the whole course of their lives, to which it imparts an intense and religious pathos."

During the First World War, Jamieson served on Shetland's school board and led it temporarily as chair. She was the first woman in Shetland to serve on a public committee. In 1919, she also volunteered, alongside "Mrs Menzies and Misses Mitchell" to tend to the graves of Norwegian naval men who had been killed during a German raid on their convoy and who had been buried in Shetland, which was reported on in the Shetland News.

In 1930, Jamieson founded the Shetland Folklore Society to help revive local Shetland culture. The society met to practise traditional dances. Men would meet at her home, Twageos House, to perform sword dances to local music. She wrote a play in Shetland dialect Da Dooble Sporin (1935). She also spent time working to transcribe church records.

== Later life and death ==
In 1935 Jamieson was suffering with asthma and she left the islands to emigrate to New Zealand to live with her brother Dr James Jamieson in the hope of gaining some respite. She died in Nelson, New Zealand, in 1942.

== See also ==
- E. S. Reid Tait
