= James Jamieson (New Zealand doctor) =

New Zealand doctor and lobbyist (1880–1963)

James Peter Speid Jamieson CBE (9 February 1880 – 18 January 1963) was a New Zealand medical doctor and political lobbyist.

== Biography ==
Jamieson was born in Cruisdale near Sandness in the Shetland islands of Scotland on 9 February 1880. Following his parents who were both teachers he planned to become a teacher and attended the University of Edinburgh to study arts. Encouraged by his brother Edward who was already studying medicine, he changed to medicine. Edward Jamieson was the author of a book on anatomy, and another brother, J. K. Jamieson, was a professor of anatomy at Leeds. His sister, the suffragist and writer, Christina Jamieson, joined him in New Zealand in 1935; she died in 1942.

Jamieson graduated MB ChB in 1905. In 1930, he received the degree of Doctor of Medicine from the University of Edinburgh. From 1907 to 1908, he was in South Africa as medical officer for a mining company, where he met his future wife, nurse Janet Milligan Boddon. They married in 1908 and had two daughters and two sons, one of whom was Dr E. S. Jamieson.

Jamieson emigrated to New Zealand, initially working in Collingwood and then in Eketāhuna. In 1915, he became a surgeon and medical superintendent of Nelson Hospital until 1920 when he went into general practice. He was an examiner in surgery for the University of Otago.

While holding several positions in the New Zealand Branch of the British Medical Association (NZBMA), Jamieson lobbied against the Labour government's social security reforms. He was chairman of the National Health Insurance (NHI) committee from 1935 to 1941, president from 1938 to 1939 and chairman of council 1943 to 1944. The NZBMA opposed the government's proposal to introduce free medical care, though the proposal was later amended to allow doctors to charge for services. He was also the first chair of the Medical Practitioners Disciplinary Committee set up under the Medical Practitioners Amendment Act.

Jamieson was president of the Nelson Aero Club and became a founding director of Cook Strait Airways in 1934. He took an interest in forestry, particularly Pinus radiata cultivation, and hosted the British Commonwealth Forestry Conference in 1957.

Jamieson died in Nelson on 18 January 1963.

== Honours and awards ==
In 1950, Jamieson was the first person outside of the United Kingdom to receive the gold medal of the British Medical Association. In the 1956 Queen's Birthday Honours, he was appointed a Commander of the Order of the British Empire, in recognition of his services as a medical practitioner.
