= Maiden Stack =

Coordinates: 60°19′46″N 1°39′26″W

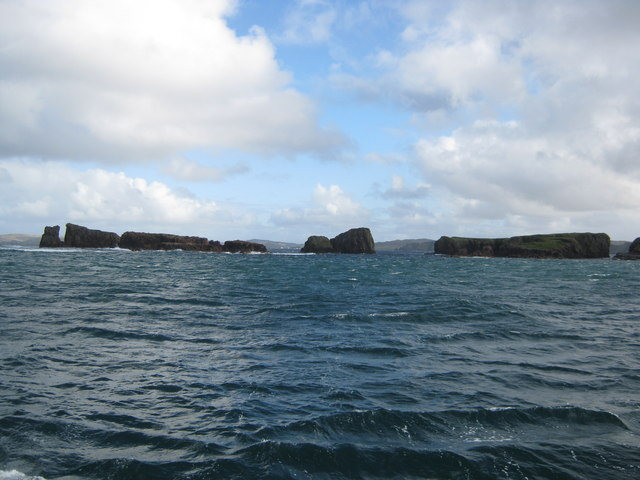
Taken from the ferry, in this image Brei Holm is at right with Maiden Stack immediately to its left and at centre. An unanmed stack in front of Maiden Stack appears as if joined to it, to the left of the highest point. (Note: See also Canmore for aerial photos.)

The Maiden Stack or Frau Stack is a tiny stack in the western Shetland Islands to the north of Brei Holm and east of Housa Voe about 140 metres (150 yd) off Papa Stour. Reaching 7.6 metres (25 ft) above sea level the stack is the highest of several in the area and also known locally as Muckle Fru.

== Romantic stories ==
It is so called because of the tiny house at its top, which is said to have been built in the 14th century by Lord Þorvald Þoresson, in order to imprison his daughter. The ruins of the house cover the whole of the summit of the stack and measure 11 metres (36 ft) by 5 metres (16 ft).

There are various versions of the story. In one dating from 1798 it is recorded as follows.

There is a perpendicular rock that stands in the sea, a little out from the island of Papa, very difficult to access, on which are the remains of a house, said to have been built by a gentleman of property, when about to leave the country, with a view to secure his daughter, who was in love with one inferior to her station. But Cupid, descending in a golden shower, found admission, by bribing her guardians.

This is similar to a version provided by Visit Shetland in 2006. Here the story goes that the lady was incarcerated by her father because of her interest in a common fisherman. Eventually she and her sweetheart successfully eloped.

In a third version offered by Haswell-Smith, the father's aim was to prevent her from meeting men in general but when she was released she was found to be pregnant.

A more detailed version of this story is recorded by Hibbert:

One of these insulated rocks, named Frau-a-stack or the Lady's Stack - accessible to none but the best of climbers - is crowned on the summit by the remains of a small building, that was originally built by a Norwegian Lady, to preserve herself from the solicitations of suitors, when she had entered into a vow of pure celibacy. The ascent to the house was considered almost unsurmountable, except by the help of ropes. But a dauntless lover, an udaller from Islesburgh, contrived in the dark secrecy of evening to scale the stack, and, after the first surprise was overcome, so far ingratiated himself in the fair devotee's affections that, in a fatal hour she was induced:

To trust the opportunity of night
And the ill counsel of a desert place
With the rich worth of her virginity.

When the consequence of the Lady's faux pas could no longer be concealed, Frau-a-stack became the scoff of the island, and was deserted by its fair and frail tenant. The house was soon afterwards unroofed and reduced to ruin, in contempt of the vow of chastity that had been broken'

== Alternative version ==
Historic Environment Scotland's on-line Canmore database adds that notwithstanding the "romantic" 1798 version of the tale that "the site may have been utilised for the segregation of lepers", nearby Brei Holm having had a leper colony in the 18th century. This source does however admit that the ruins on Maiden Stack are not constructed in a similar way to those of the colony.

== See also ==
- List of sea stacks in Scotland
