= Bousta =

Coordinates: 60.302°N 1.599°W

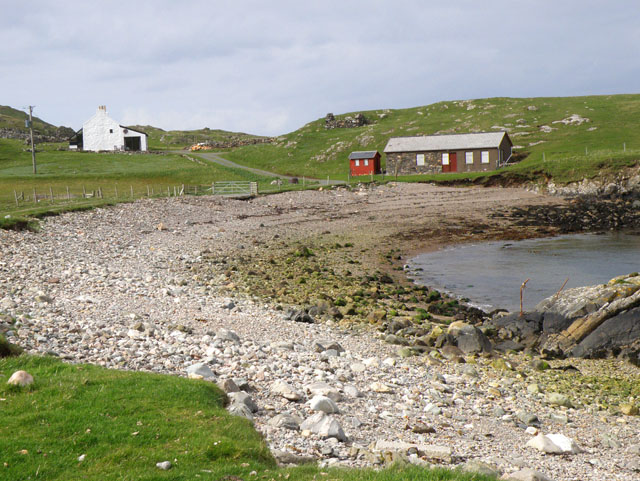
- The shoreline at Bousta

- Location within Shetland
- OS grid reference: HU221575
- Civil parish: Walls and Sandness
- Council area: Shetland
- Lieutenancy area: Shetland
- Country: Scotland
- Sovereign state: United Kingdom
- Post town: SHETLAND
- Postcode district: ZE2
- Dialling code: 01595
- Police: Scotland
- Fire: Scottish
- Ambulance: Scottish
- UK Parliament: Orkney and Shetland
- Scottish Parliament: Shetland

Bousta is a settlement on Mainland, in Shetland, Scotland. Bousta is situated in the parish of Walls and Sandness.

Scott's Hawkweed is native to the pastures west of Bousta. Barnacle geese have been observed at Bousta, as well as seals.
