= Stornoway Women's Suffrage Society =

Women's suffrage campaigners in Scotland

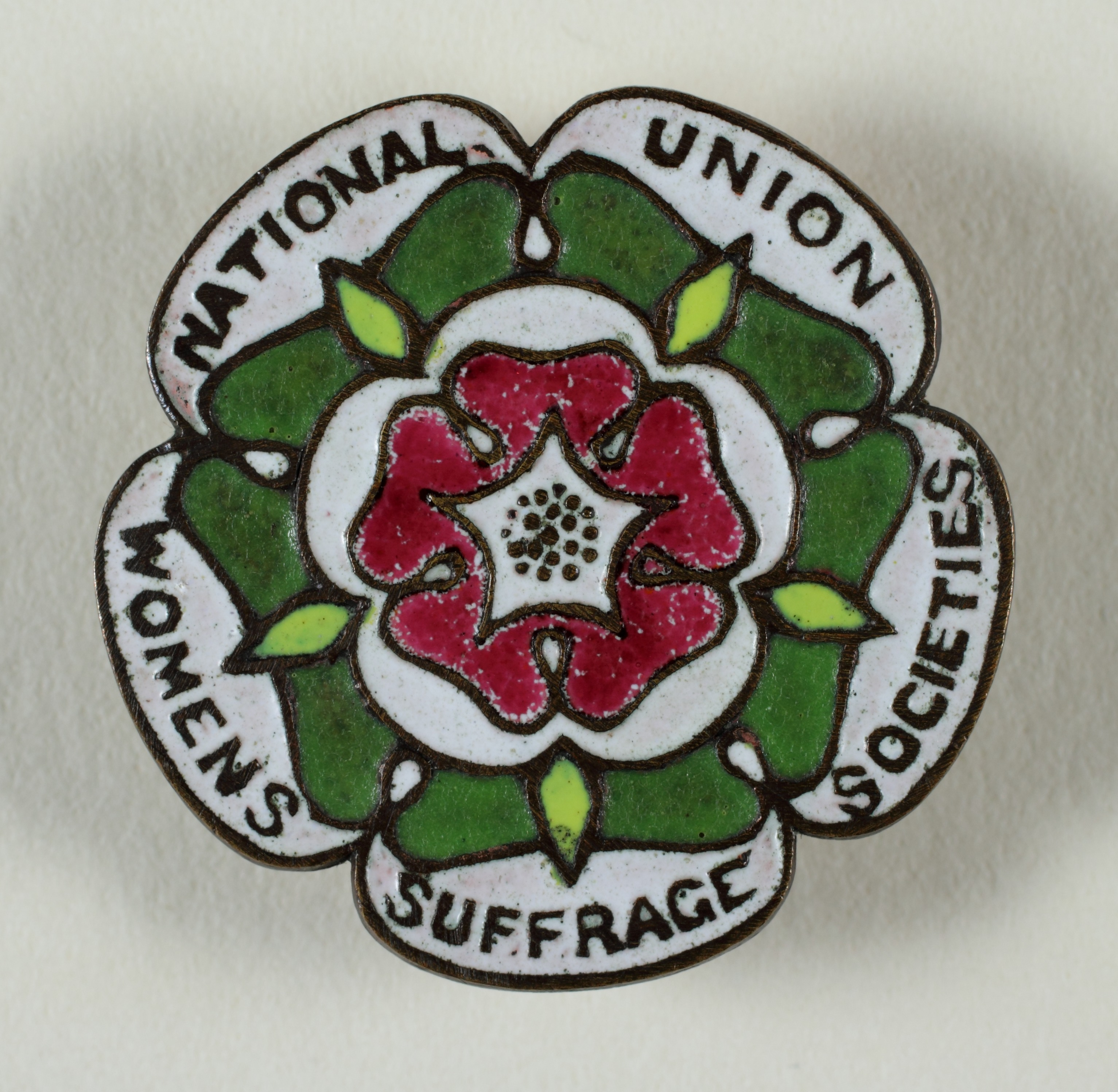
Suffrage Campaigning- National Union of Women's Suffrage Societies (NUWSS)1908-1918 (23070340306)

The Stornoway Women's Suffrage Association was an organisation that campaigned for women's suffrage across the UK, based in Stornoway, Lewis in the Western Isles of Scotland, the Hebrides.

== Hebridean women's lives ==
The association was formed of 25 women, from a community very different from the middle class London or working class factory women joining the big city suffrage societies, or the militant Women's Social and Political Union (suffragette) activities elsewhere in Scotland and across Britain.

Hebridean women were mainly heavy manual workers, physically strong women who gutted fish for the herring trawler industry, following the fleet locally, and travelling with other women from fishing villages around the coast of Scotland and Britain in the herring season.

Despite being disallowed to vote, many of the women made a significant financial contribution to the islands (£75,000 p.a. before the First World War). Others worked in crofting, in small plots growing crops and keeping animals, whilst their men were at sea. At that time, men contributed less to the islands' prosperity (£25,000 p.a.) than did the fisherwomen.

The notion of a woman's rights to work and travel was normal in coastal communities, making it a simpler case for equal franchise. The Stornoway Town Council supported the movement to give women the vote, before the Representation of the People Act (1918) made it real.

Women on the remotest island, St. Kilda (now uninhabited), were among the first to vote.

At the start of World War I, munitions factories recruited about 500 Hebridean women.

Women from the islands who were formally educated and went on to work internationally included Dr Helen McDougall, who became a doctor and radiographer in the Scottish Women's Hospital in Serbia during World War I, but was less celebrated than her brother.

== Society activities ==
The SWSS, like others associations in Scotland, was affiliated with the National Union of Women's Suffrage Societies. Despite their rural setting members spoke at public meetings, distributed fliers, and wrote articles in the local press to promote women's suffrage. Even prior to the formation of the society, they invited speakers such as Jessie Craigen from the better known suffrage movement in larger cities.

== Centenary production ==
In 2018 to celebrate the centenary of the passing of the 1918 Representation of the People Act (which gave some women the right to vote), the play Deeds Not Words was commissioned. Researched and written by Toria Banks and directed by Muriel Ann Macleod, with music by Mary Ann Kennedy, it toured the Hebrides with a cast and production team of local women and those from other parts of Scotland.

The play was sponsored by Rural Nations Scotland CIC and others to celebrate the women's suffrage movement in the Hebrides, a hidden history of local engagement in the national struggle for women's suffrage prior to 1918. Director Macleod said:

Everything that celebrates the Hebrides changes perception, and I certainly hope people will think differently about their grannies and what they did.

== See also ==
- Feminism in the United Kingdom
- List of suffragists and suffragettes
- List of women's rights activists
- List of women's rights organizations
- Timeline of women's suffrage
- Women's suffrage organizations
