= Papa Stour Sword Dance =

British linked sword dance

A performance of the Papa Stour Sword Dance at the Shetland Museum Foyer in May 2009.

The Papa Stour Sword Dance, or Shetland Sword Dance, is a British linked sword dance involving seven dancers, who represent the Seven Champions of Christendom: St. James of Spain, St Denis of France, St. David of Wales, St. Patrick of Ireland, St. Anthony of Italy, St Andrew of Scotland, and St. George of England. The dance originated on the island of Papa Stour in Shetland.

According to popular tradition the dance was on the brink of extinction by the early 1800s, until Sir Walter Scott wrote a fictional account of it in his novel The Pirate. Scott included a description and the script of the real dance in the notes to the Magnum Opus edition of the novel.

The music for the Papa Stour Sword Dance is a muckle reel mostly in quadruple meter. There are multiple versions of the lyrics.

== History ==
An account of the Papa Stour Sword Dance is supposed to have been included in Reverend George Low's A Tour through the Islands of Orkney and Shetland around 1770. In 1814 Sir Walter Scott mentioned in his diary that he had been regaled with a verbal description of the Papa Stour Sword Dance. In 1820, Scott published his novel The Pirate which included a scene of a fictional account of the Papa Stour Sword Dance performed by his protagonists. In his Magnum Opus edition of The Pirate, published in 1831, Scott wrote a description of the real sword dance, along with a script of the lyrics, calling it "A Danish or Norwegian Ballet.

In 1822, Dr. Samuel Hibbert published his Description of the Shetland Islands in which he described the Papa Stour Sword Dance and gave a script of its lyrics with his own revisions.

Alex Johnson wrote an article about the Papa Stour Sword Dance for the Shetland Times in 1926.

The music for the Papa Stour Sword Dance was preserved and published by Peter Cook in Fiddle Tradition of the Shetland Isles.

The dance has been revived in performance on and off since the 19th century. It is currently performed by 25 members between a junior and senior team.

== Music ==
The music for the Papa Stour Sword Dance is in the key of A major and performed usually by a solo fiddle. It is divided into two parts, a short introduction called "The Tripp", followed by the Dance Proper.

The "Tripp", in quadruple meter, is used as a solo introduction for each of the dancers' pas seul.

After each of the Seven Champions has been introduced, the Dance Proper begins. The Dance Proper is described as a "muckle reel" by Peter Cook. It has three sections that are played repeatedly as needed until the dance is finished. The A section is in duple meter, the B section shifts to quadruple meter, the C section to triple meter.

=== Lyrics ===
There are different versions of the lyrics, which are spoken before each repetition of the Tripp to introduce each character.

Sir Walter Scott, in his notes to the Magnum Opus edition of The Pirate, gave a script of the lyrics that he received from a Dr. James Scott. Dr. Samuel Hibbert also published an edited version of the lyrics in his book Description of the Shetland Isles. These are the versions usually referred to by performers when practicing.

Scott's version of the lyrics is much longer but in both his and Hibbert's St. George introduces each of the Seven Champions and orders them to "prove their manhood" by dancing. He gives a brief description of each champion, including their country of origin and mentions one of their exploits.
