= Shetland Women's Suffrage Society =

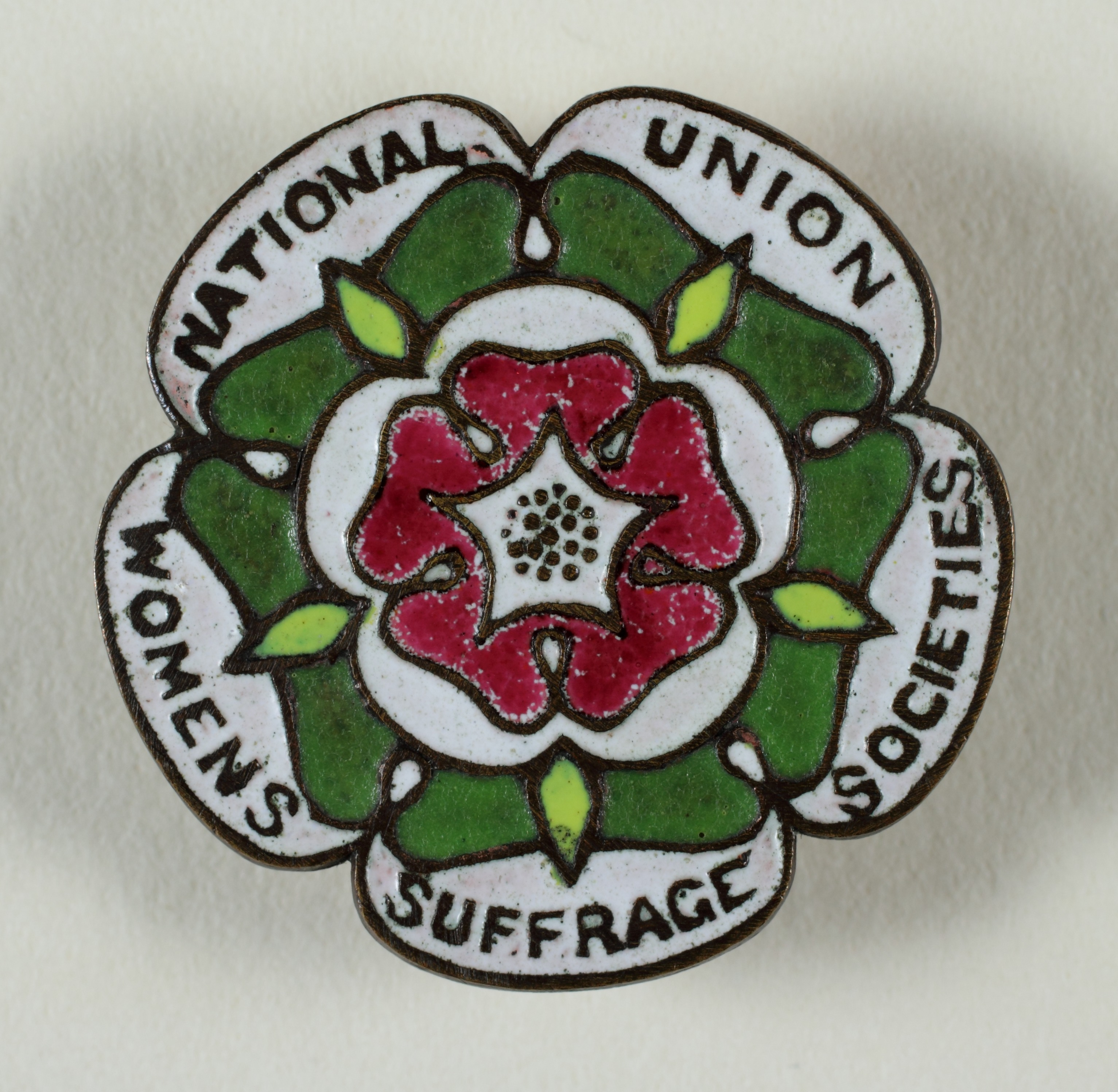
Suffrage Campaigning- National Union of Women's Suffrage Societies (NUWSS)1908-1918 (23070340306)

The Shetland Women's Suffrage Association was an organisation involved in campaigning for women’s suffrage, based in Shetland.

== Formation ==
The association was formed in 1909. Their first meeting was held in the home of Christina Jamieson on 23 October 1909. There were 19 women and 1 man present, and the meeting was convened by Christina Jamieson

== Activities ==
The organisation was affiliated to the National Union of Women's Suffrage Societies. As such, their activities mirrored those of many other suffragist groups. They conveyed their message by addressing public meetings, distributing leaflets, and writing to the local press to promote the cause of women's suffrage.

In 1911, a banner, created by Stanley Cursiter, of the Orcadian Women's Suffrage Society, and Christina Jamieson was taken to London for the Suffrage Coronation Procession.

During the First World War, the society provided assistance to injured soldiers. They prepared bandages, held first aid classes, and nursing classes. The group also raised money, contributing to the Scottish Women's Hospitals by donating money for the "Lerwick Bed".

== Notable members ==
Christina Jamieson, secretary.

Alice Lyall Leisk, Assistant Secretary and Treasurer (daughter of Harriet Leisk).

Harriet Leisk, chair.

Anna Stout, first president

== See also ==
- Feminism in the United Kingdom
- List of suffragists and suffragettes
- List of women's rights activists
- List of women's rights organizations
- Timeline of women's suffrage
- Women's suffrage organizations
