= Sandness =

Headland and district in the west of Shetland Mainland, Scotland

Coordinates: 60°17′58″N 1°39′10″W

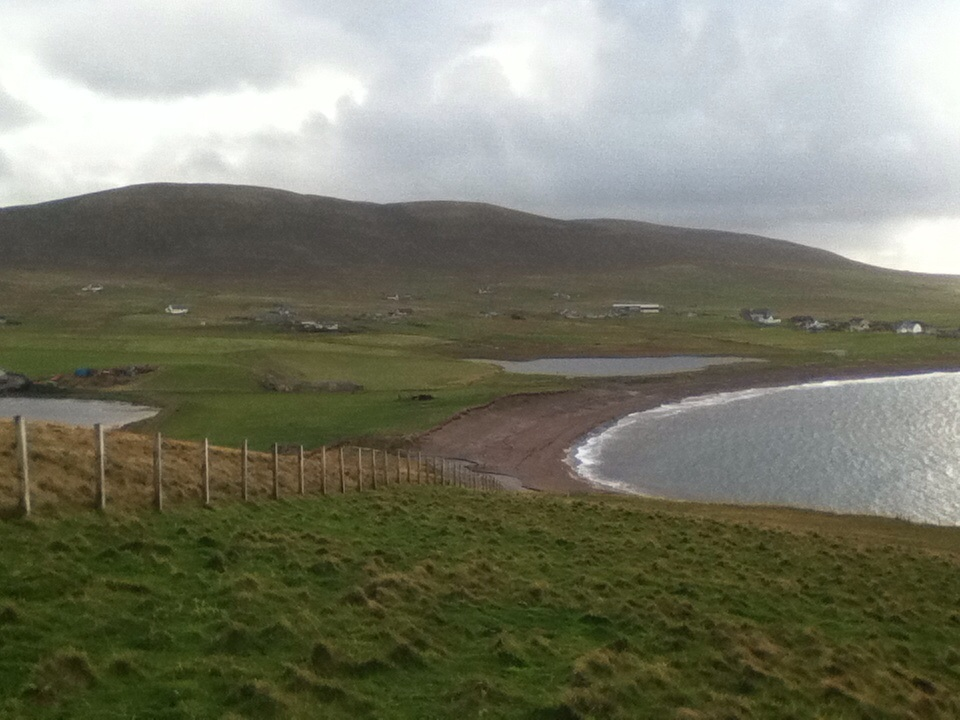
Sandness - Norby Beach

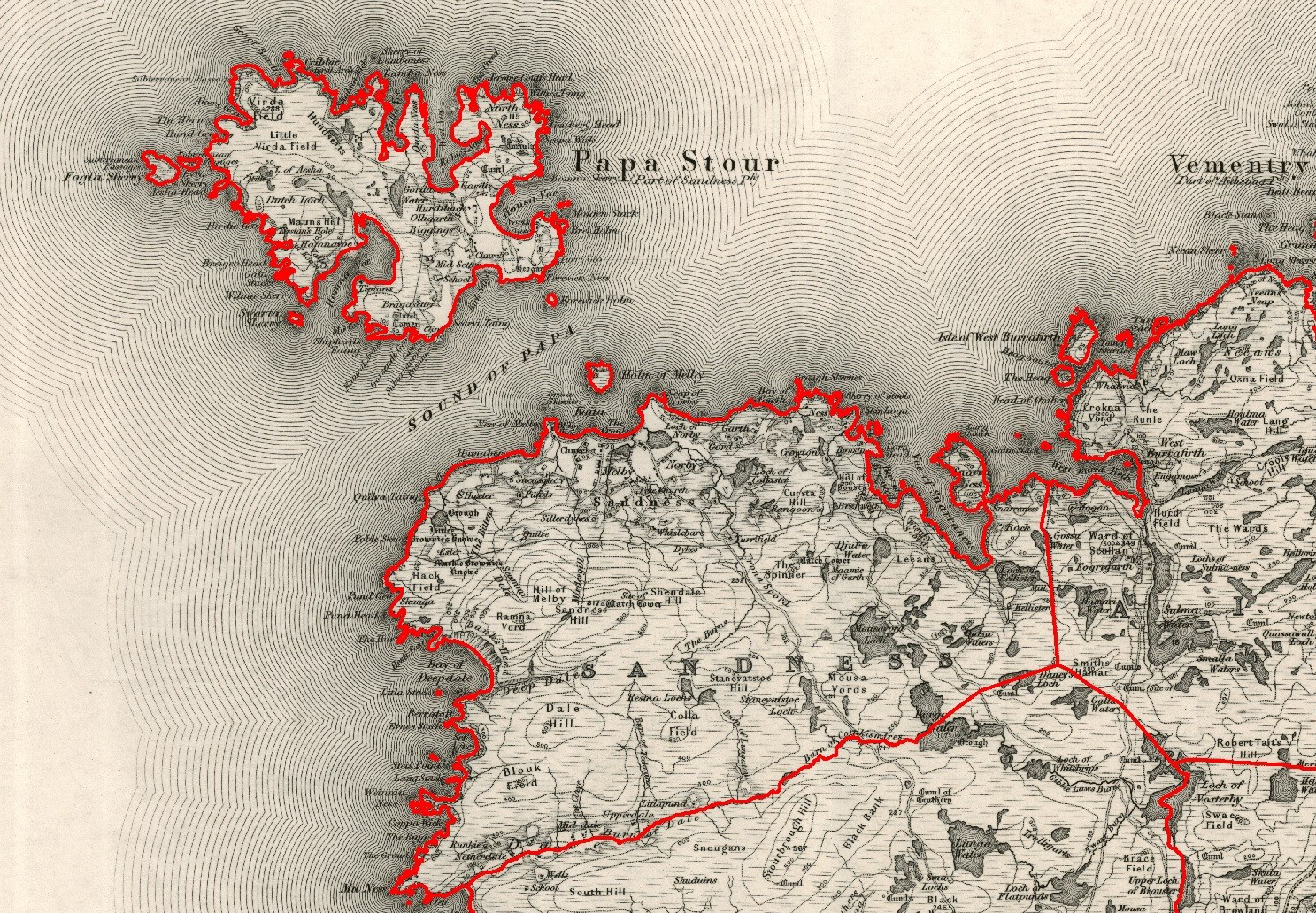
1878 map of Sandness Parish

Sandness (Shaetlan pronunciation: [ˈsaːnəs] SAH-nəs) is a headland and district in Shetland Mainland, Scotland. It includes the westernmost point of Shetland Mainland. Sandness was a civil parish, which also included the island of Papa Stour a mile northwest across Papa Sound. In 1891, it was combined with Walls to the south, to form Walls and Sandness Parish, which had an administrative function until the abolition of civil parishes in Scotland by the Local Government (Scotland) Act 1929, and had been a statistical regional unit since. Currently, the community council area of Sandness and Walls covers about the same area. The 1878 map of Sandness Parish shows that the parish to the east was Aithsting, before it was included into Sandsting to the south.

The headland flanks the south side of Papa Sound near Papa Stour leading into St Magnus Bay and the district includes the headland and forms the mainland part of Walls parish. The land itself is fairly fertile for Shetland and runs from Bousta to Huxter, with Norby and Melby in the middle. The 249 metres (817 ft) summit of Sandness Hill lies south of the village.

The village has approximately 160 residents and 75 inhabited houses. The village has a number of small businesses, including a bed and breakfast, a leather worker, a woollen mill, a baker, as well as Britain's most northerly vegbox scheme. It has no village shop: the nearest one is just south of the village in Walls. It has three churches, with only two still in use; the other is privately owned and used as a shed.

Near the village are Huxter Ancient Watermills, an important group of three pre-industrial water mills.

The village is at the end of the A971 road towards Lerwick.

== Fishing ==
The Annual Reports of the Fishery Board for Scotland provide an insight into fishing in Sandness in the years before the First World War.

Fishery Statistics

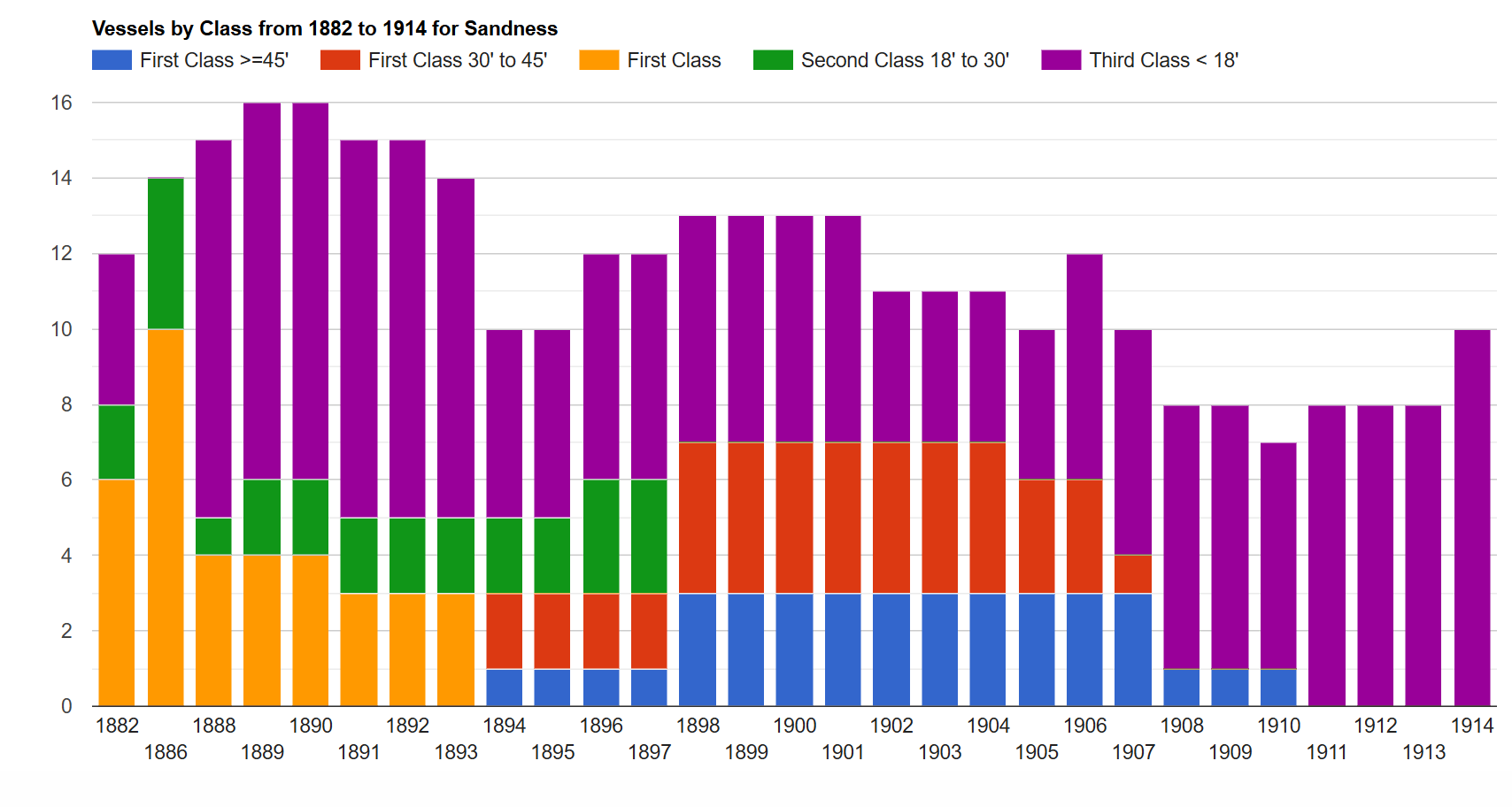
Vessels by class

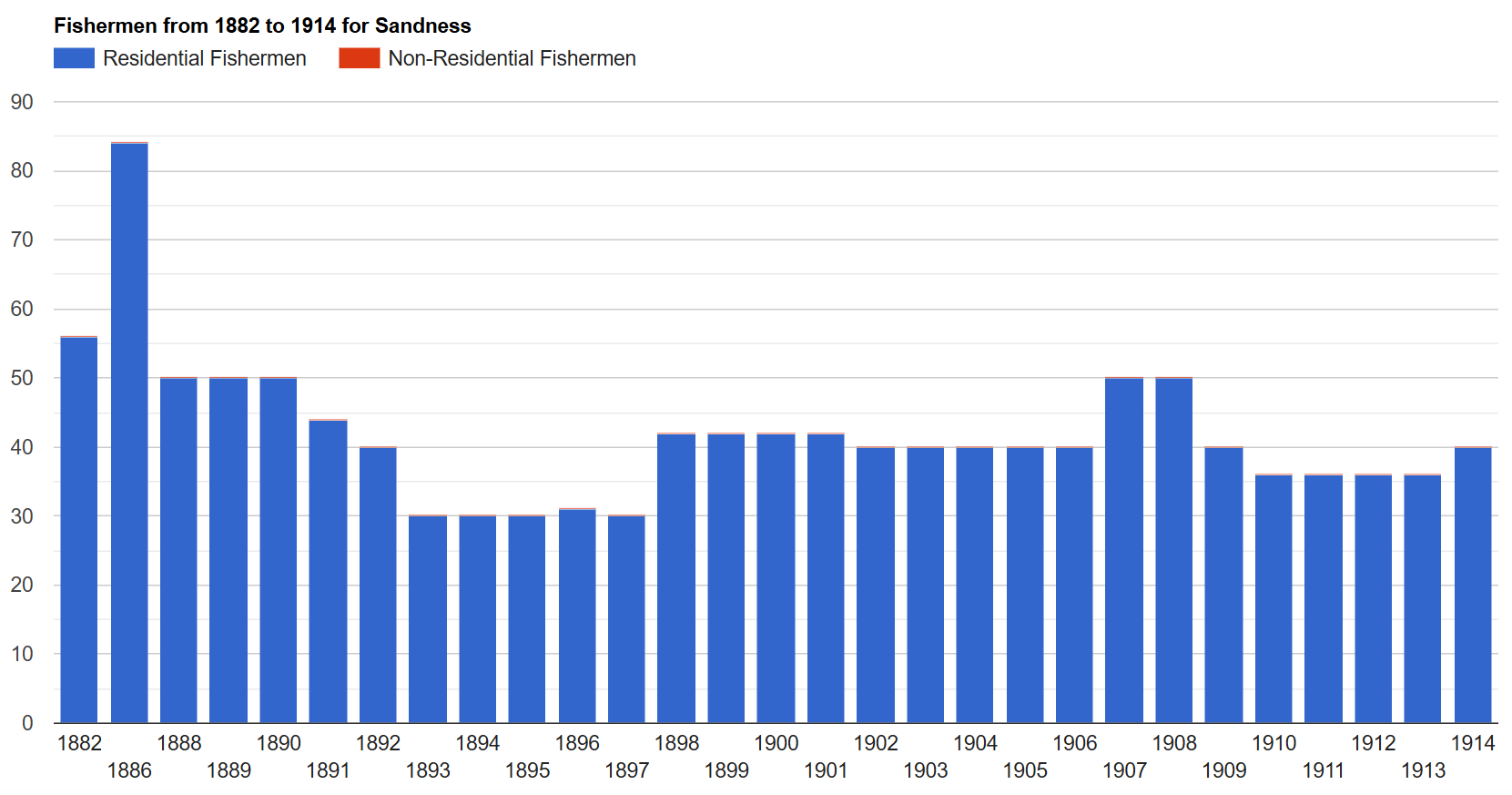
Fishermen

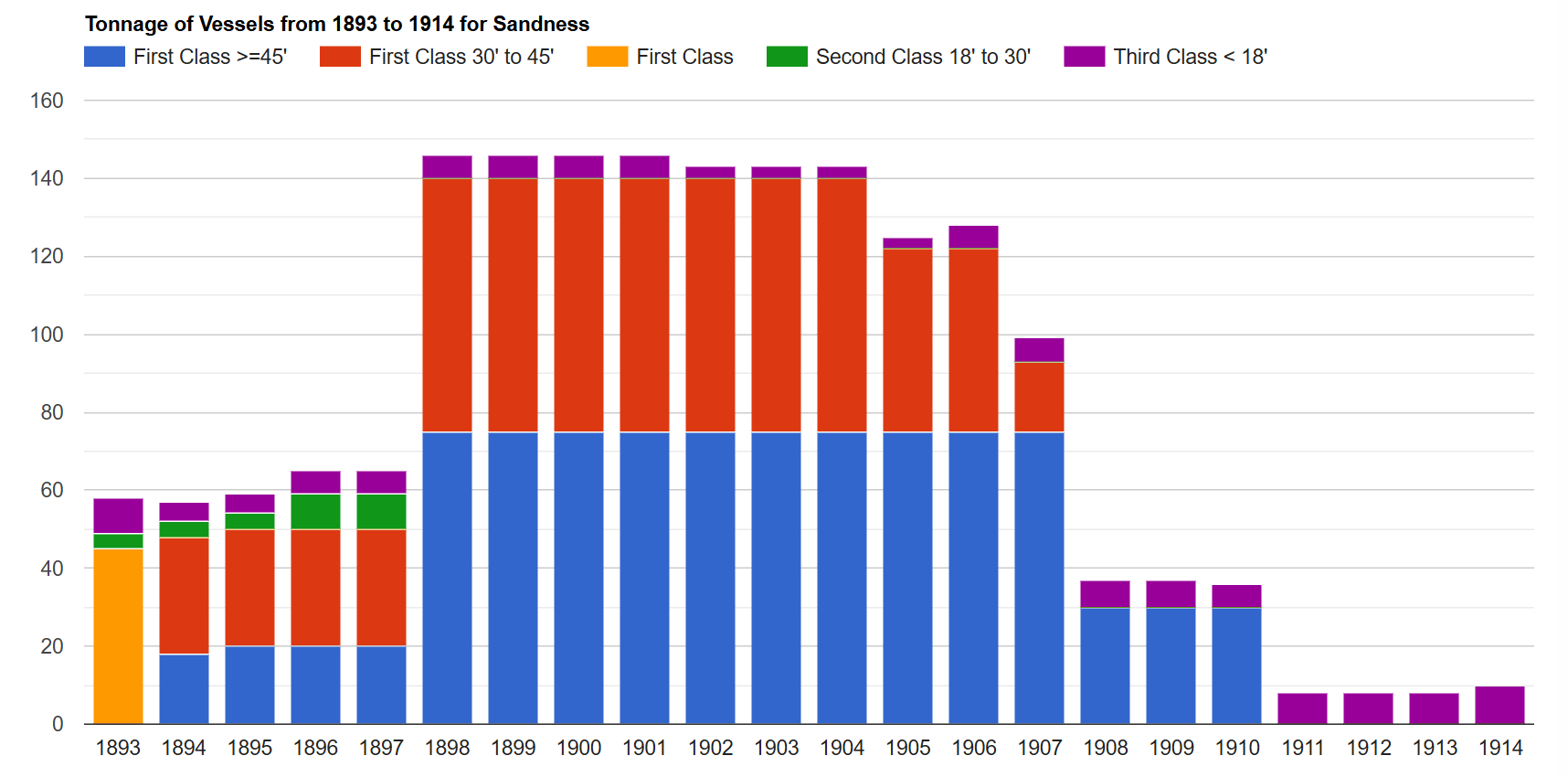
Tonnage of vessels

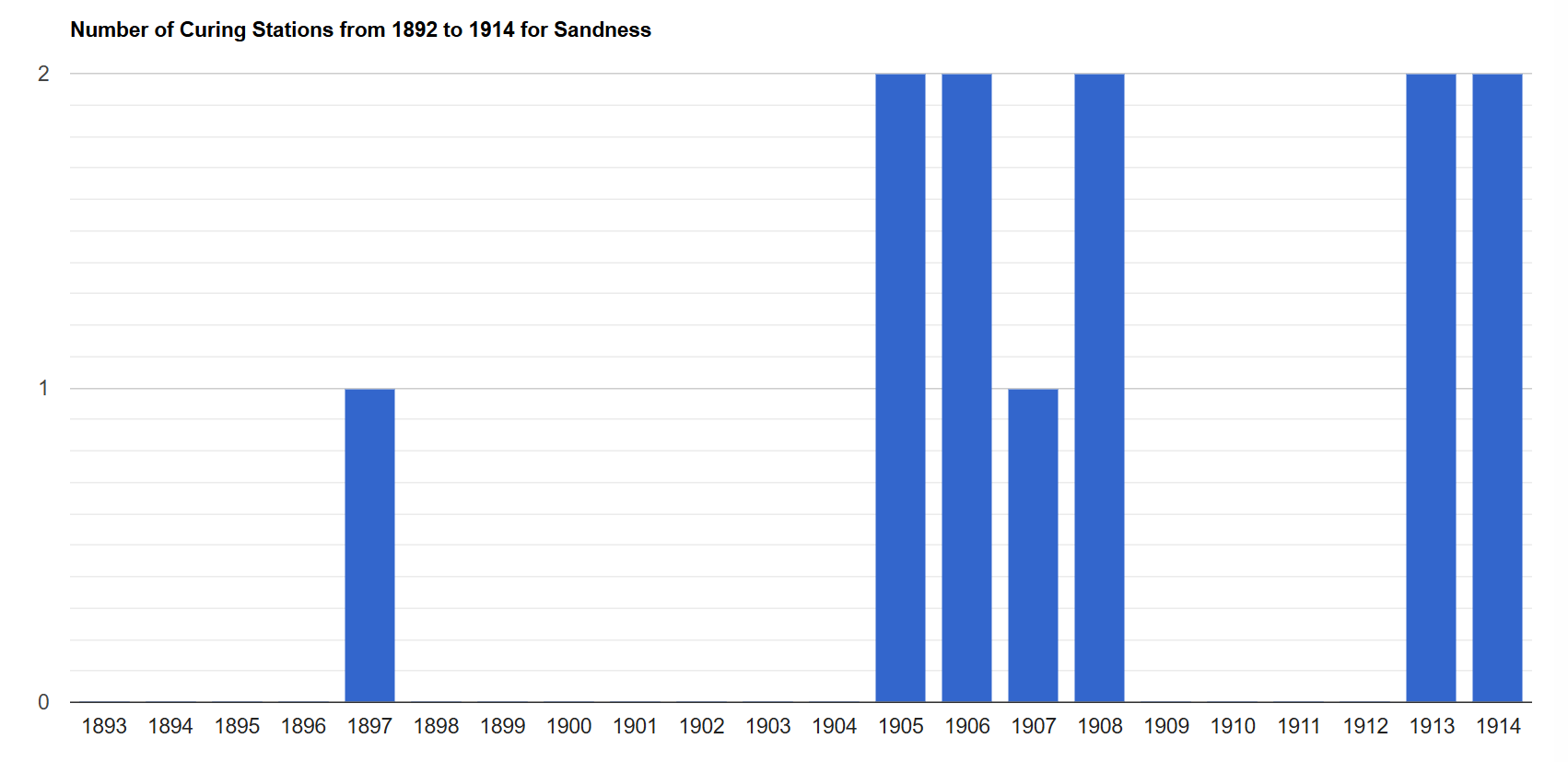
Number of curing stations

== Notable people ==
- Christina Jamieson (1864–1942), writer and suffragist, was born here
- James Jamieson (1880–1963), doctor in New Zealand (brother of Christina)
- Robert Alan Jamieson, born 1958, poet and novelist, grew up here

== See also ==
- List of listed buildings in Walls and Sandness, Shetland Islands
