= Stuart "Captain Calamity" Hill =

British sailor and activist (born c. 1943)

Stuart Hill
- Born: possibly 1943 (age 80-81); Suffolk, England
- Other name: Captain Calamity
- Known for: Claiming the Island of Forvik (2008-?), being repeatedly rescued while sailing

Stuart Hill (born around 1943) is an English pensioner. He was dubbed "Captain Calamity" in 2001 after he needed to be rescued from multiple misadventures while sailing. He later moved to the Shetland Islands, where he took to protesting around constitutional matters. In 2008, he made claims relating to the formation of a micronation, which he called the Sovereign State of Forvik. His disputes led to several court appearances. He was convicted of road traffic offences and vandalism and declared bankrupt. Hill unsuccessfully stood for election to Orkney and Shetland as an independent in the 2017 United Kingdom general election where he came last.

== Early life ==
Hill was born around 1943 in Suffolk, England. He was formerly a metalworker.

== Attempt to circumnavigate the British Isles ==
In 2001, aged 58, he left Suffolk on a sailing trip. Media reports used the "Captain Calamity" epithet when Hill caused five lifeboat launches and two rescue helicopter call-outs during a failed attempt to single-handedly circumnavigate Britain in a "15-foot (4.6 m) dinghy" during 2001. His vessel Maximum Exposure – a "converted rowing boat" "likened to a glorified sailboard" with a sail "cannibalized" from a windsurfing board – was considered by many, including the Coastguard and RNLI, to be under-equipped and "unfit" for such a journey.

Louis Rivett-Carnac, of the Great Yarmouth coastguard said

"This type of craft is totally unsuitable for what he wanted to do. Even if you were Francis Drake you would have trouble in a craft like that."

Hill's problems began when his launch was delayed for a month after he suffered an allergic reaction to resin he was using to treat the hull of his boat. He launched into the River Stour near his Manningtree home in May 2001. As he set off "someone had to chase after him with a spare centreboard". He later damaged his vessel after he crashed his ship into another, only moments after beginning his trip. Six days and 100 miles later he had to be towed ashore by Cromer lifeboat Ruby and Arthur Reed II after calling Cromer coastguard in Norfolk to report that his mast, taken from a sailboard, had split.

Soon after he ran into trouble with the authorities for "selling promotional T-shirts without a licence".

After a three-week delay he set sail into high winds and what Coastguards described as "the worst weather forecast possible" and progressed less than 3 miles in three days. He got as far as Sheringham before a Lifeboat and helicopter went to his aid. Hill refused their assistance and stated he wished to carry on with his journey. Coastguards received numerous calls from concerned members of the public "who thought he was about to go down." but he "insisted on carrying on against the advice of coastguards and rescuers."

Hill had made it as far as Trimingham, south of Cromer, Norfolk, before another rescue attempt was made. He had reportedly gone to sea "with a hole in the hull of his boat, which let in gallons of water, soaking his radio and cutting off communication with the shore" and "spent weeks drifting off the coast of East Anglia" "(But) each time the coastguards came out to him, he sent them away until he had to admit that there was a hole in the vessel that he had described as "unsinkable".

Louis Rivett-Carnac, of Great Yarmouth coastguard said

"A lifeboat went to offer him assistance and persuade him that it was crazy and he was costing us a fortune so he decided to knock it on the head"

He was towed ashore to Cromer beach. He again caused trouble for rescue agencies when he was "spotted drifting in circles 22 miles out in busy shipping lanes" and the Coastguard were unable to contact him. On his return to inshore waters the Lowestoft lifeboat in Suffolk had to put to sea to warn him he was so close to shore that he was in danger of running aground. Chris Barnes, honorary secretary of the Cromer lifeboat, said

"My coxswain described it like putting someone blindfold in the middle of the M1 and telling everyone else to miss them," and that Hill should never have attempted his voyage, but the RNLI would always go to his aid.

He also "blundered" into an area of sea "intended for a practice bombing run by RAF Tornados".

He made it as far north as Shetland calling in at Baltasound in Unst to get supplies. He was next spotted rounding Muckle Flugga lighthouse heading out into the Atlantic. Soon after, his vessel capsized in 20 ft-high seas 50 miles (80 km) west of the islands in August 2001. "He was asleep in his bunk" when his boat overturned but managed to contact rescuers via a satellite phone and spent around an hour in the sea clinging to the upturned vessel. Kieran Murray, helicopter winchman on Coastguard rescue helicopter Oscar Charlie, based in Shetland, said Hill was "extremely lucky" to survive.

He spent a night in hospital suffering from hypothermia but stated that he was "undeterred" and may attempt the journey again. He later wished "he hadn't called them (the rescue services). If only he had held on until the next morning when it was calm and clear, he might have made it and shown the world that a small guy could build a world-beating boat." Despite the multiple problems with his boat and the eventual capsize Hill dismissed claims that it was unseaworthy stating "The boat was designed for extreme conditions and it's stood up really well".

=== Cost to emergency services ===
Hill had originally planned to raise money for charity. However, Rab Taylor, Great Yarmouth coastguard's Operations Manager, told the BBC

"Launching the lifeboat, offshore and inshore, helicopters, Nimrod aircraft and using other vessels at sea all costs money and it could be counter-productive compared to what Hill is going to raise for charities through this trip."

Estimates at how much Hill cost rescue services range from £10,000 to £80,000.

Despite being "heavily criticised for wasting the time and resources of the coastguard and lifeboat services", Hill felt "no guilt about taking up so much of their time". He said "If there's a service for those in peril on the sea, surely it should be used – I only really cost them the diesel."

== Forewick Holm ==
In 2008 a civil action was brought against him by an accountancy firm based in Shetland.

On 21 June 2008, Hill, occasional resident of a 2.5-acre (1.0 ha) island in Shetland called Forewick Holm (renamed Forvik Island), made a declaration of independence which he says created the Crown Dependency of Forvik, his rights to the Island of Forewick are disputed. Mark King, the island's owner, stated in March 2009 Hill had not paid for the island as agreed. Hill claims the island was not part of the United Kingdom and therefore not part of the European Union.

== Further rescues ==
On Sunday 14 September 2008 Hill had to be rescued again from the seas of Shetland after launching a "home made" plywood boat, described as "ramshackle" and a "floating wardrobe", without a radio or lifejacket in very poor weather conditions. The boat was "swamped by a heavy sea."

He alerted Shetland coastguard via mobile telephone at 10.30pm and told them that he was "drifting without engines in a boat full of water" in the Sound of Papa on the West of Shetland. A spokesman from the coastguard said the "Sound of Papa was a treacherous place to be in a small boat."

The coastguard helicopter and Aith lifeboat were launched and Hill was picked up by the crew of the lifeboat and taken ashore just after midnight.

Hylton Henry, coxwain of the Aith Lifeboat, said Hill was very lucky to be alive.

"He didn't have a lifejacket on or a VHF radio. He had a flare but couldn't use it and by the time we got there, his mobile phone battery was flat. He was difficult to find because his boat had sunk by then and he was sitting on the surface of the water in it in the dark. The stretch of water where we found him is one of the most treacherous in Britain. If it had been a worse night, he wouldn't have survived. The description of the boat was a wardrobe on its back floating in the water – and that was pretty accurate. It's a humble thing and totally unsuitable for the conditions. Now that winter is coming, I hope he realises it is not safe to do what he is doing. He will be putting other lives at risk by going out to rescue him. If he carries on like this, he will need rescuing again, there is no doubt of that."

Hill hoped to salvage his boat and use it again.

Stuart Hill told the Shetland Times newspaper that his reputation as a calamitous mariner was one thing he would "like to put to bed" but "it seems to follow me around."

== Causing purposeful hazards to shipping ==
On 14 April 2009 Hill wrote a letter to the Shetland News website claiming that he had installed "devices" in the waters surrounding Forewick Holm "that can hole the hull of any boat and others [devices] designed to foul propellers."

== Legal issues ==
After announcing his "independent state", Hill refused to register his vehicle or pay road tax. He was arrested in Lerwick in July 2011 and charged with road traffic offences. In December 2011 Hill was sentenced to 100 hours community service and given a 6-month driving ban for driving a "consular vehicle" which had fake licence plates and was uninsured.

In September 2011, Hill was declared bankrupt, after a civil action was brought against him by a debt agency. Having made claims against the Royal Bank of Scotland, he appeared at the Court of Session in Edinburgh in July 2012, where Judge Pentland rejected Hill's arguments.

Hill breached his community payback order and appeared in court again in September 2012. His contempt of court led to him serving a detention of sixteen days at HM Prison Peterhead.

In February 2017 Hill was fined £125 after being convicted of vandalism to a commercial property in Cunningsburgh in March 2016.

In February 2020, Hill appeared in court for failing to have declared campaign expenses and was then jailed for contempt of court, after making recordings of his own trial and refusing to delete them.

In August 2023 he was again remanded in custody for contempt of court.

In June 2025 he was sentenced to three months in prison after refusing to comply with an unpaid work order.

== 2017 election candidate ==
Hill stood for election to Orkney and Shetland as an independent in the 2017 UK general election. While he went to Orkney for the election count, a boat shed that he had built without planning permission was pulled down. In the election, Hill came last with 245 votes (1.1%). He refused to submit a return of his election expenses, which is required under UK law.
