= SV Illeri =

Norwegian marine vessel

History
- Name: Illeri
- Owner: Tobiassen P., Sandefjord (1878 - 1899); Iversen R., Sandefjord (1899 - 1902); P. A. Grøn, Sandefjord
- Completed: 1878
- Identification: Call sign HNJW
- Fate: Wrecked on Ve Skerries, Shetland in fog 9 May 1909

General characteristics
- Type: Brigantine (1878-1907); Brig (1907-1909)
- Tonnage: 236 GRT
- Length: 33.4 metres (110 ft)
- Beam: 8.1 metres (27 ft)
- Depth: 3.6 metres (12 ft)
- Propulsion: Sailing ship

SV Illeri was a Norwegian transport ship built in 1878 which operated until its wrecking on the Ve Skerries, Shetland on 9 May 1909.

== Description ==
Illeri was built as a brigantine for Tobiassen P. of Sandefjord, Norway and was completed in 1878. The ship was built to a length of 33.4 metres (110 ft), a beam of 8.1 metres (27 ft) and a depth of 3.6 metres (12 ft), and had a gross tonnage of 236 GRT. In 1907, the vessel was re-rigged as a brig.

== Wrecking ==
While travelling between the Faroe Islands and Leith in ballast under the command of Captain Samuelson, Illeri went aground on the northeast end of the Ve Skerries, Shetland early in the morning of Sunday 9 May 1909 due to poor visibility in thick fog. The conditions were calm enough to allow the crew to consider abandoning ship in a smaller boat kept aboard. When the ship started breaking up, the ship's papers were gathered and it was abandoned. The boat was directed to Muckle Roe, where they were redirected to Olnafirth where the Norwegian Olna Whaling Station was based, to which they safely arrived.

On the same morning, a report from Sandness reached Divisional Officer Mr Rogers at Fort Charlotte, Lerwick that the ship had wrecked. He summoned the Northern Lighthouse Commissioners' steamship Pole Star (which was leaving port) by semaphore to return and conveyed the report to the chief officer. Pole Star then proceeded to the Ve Skerries, where they found the ship waterlogged and abandoned. The ship's state indicated it had been quickly abandoned - The Orkney Herald reported that "they found the sails merely clued up, but not stowed, the side lights burning, and a 24 hour alarm timepiece lying on the cabin table still going." They were able to retrieve more of the ship's papers still aboard the vessel, which were passed on to the Receiver of Wreck in Scalloway. The following day Pole Star learned the crew had arrived in Olnafirth while delivering supplies to Muckle Roe.

Some of the Illeri crew (including the captain) visited the wreck again on Monday 10 May, however the ship was by then "a total wreck". The crew were forwarded on to Lerwick on 11 May, and were then sent by the Norwegian Consul to Leith aboard SS Queen on Thursday 13 May.

== See also ==
- Ve Skerries
- List of shipwrecks in 1909
- List of shipwrecks of the United Kingdom

== Sources ==
- Lettens, Jan (2 January 2017). "SV Illeri (+1909)". Wrecksite.
- "Crew Landed at Olnafirth". The Shetland Times. 15 May 1909. p. 4 – via The British Newspaper Archive.
- "Illeri: Ve Skerries, Atlantic". Canmore.
- "Norske skipsforlis i 1909" [Norwegian shipwrecks in 1909]. Skipet (in Norwegian). 7 May 2019.
- "Wreck of a Norwegian Brigantine". Orkney Herald, and Weekly Advertiser and Gazette for the Orkney & Zetland Islands. 19 May 1909. p. 4 – via The British Newspaper Archive.
