= Bessie Skea =

Scottish writer and poet

The writer Bessie Skea, also known as Bessie Grieve.

Bessie Skea or Bessie Grieve (1923–1996) was a Scottish writer of prose and poetry. Inspired by her native Orkney Islands in the north of Scotland, her reputation grew from her regular contributions to The Orcadian newspaper under the name Countrywoman, and she went on to publish a number of books. She wrote mainly about the natural world and island life.

== Life ==
Jemima Bessie Skea was born on 28 June 1923 on the island of Shapinsay where her mother Margaret was postmistress and her father John was a crofter and poet. She went to school there and started writing at the age of nine. In the first year of World War II she wrote about the "weirdly beautiful" light effects of the bombing raids on Scapa Flow. In 1942 she married Jim Grieve, who had been posted to a wartime battery at Salt Ness not far from her home and, after a couple of moves, they settled on Harray with their three children. After that she was widely known as Bessie Grieve, but used the name Bessie Skea for her books. She went to night school in the 1960s to extend her education with a Higher qualification in English. She was a cat lover who sometimes wrote about her pets, a member of the Orkney Field Club and in later life she enjoyed photography. She died at Ostoft, Shapinsay, where she was born, on 19 May 1996.

== Writing ==
Her first published work was in the Orkney Herald in 1958. She wrote for them regularly as 'Countrywoman' until its closure three years later, and continued from then on in The Orcadian until her death in 1996. She was encouraged and championed by the renowned Orkney poet George Mackay Brown who said she saw nature "through the eye of a poet" and described places that were "never vividly recorded till now". He wrote introductions for some of her anthologies, and was her friend, as was the writer Ernest Marwick. As well as her columns she wrote short stories and poems.

Her style was "sharply honed, discerning, lyrical", "perceptive and poetic". She has been called "one of Orkney’s foremost literary figures".

== Bibliography ==
1. Melons and icicles: a book of Orkney memories (with an introduction by George Mackay Brown), Kirkwall: WR Mackintosh 1963
2. Waves and tangles (with an introduction by George Mackay Brown), Kirkwall: WR Mackintosh 1964
3. A Countrywoman's Calendar, Kirkwall, and Danville PA: Yesnaby Publications.1962
4. A Countrywoman's diary: from the pages of The Orkney Herald and The Orcadian, Edinburgh: Gordon Wright 1983
5. Island Journeys, Orkney Press 1993
6. Misfit, in Orkney Short Stories, George Mackay Brown, Orkney Press, 1983, p76
