= MV Dayspring =

Shipwreck in Scotland

- Dayspring grounded at Caol Beach in 2023

History

United Kingdom
- Name: Dayspring
- Launched: 1975
- Commissioned: 1975
- Decommissioned: 2000
- In service: 26 June 1975
- Out of service: 12 September 2000
- Identification: SSR 147526
- Fate: Ran aground at Corpach, Scotland, 8 December 2011

General characteristics
- Class & type: Fishing vessel
- Tonnage: 188.7
- Length: 25.6 m (84 ft 0 in)
- Beam: 7.2 m (23 ft 7 in)
- Draught: 3.2 m (10 ft 6 in)

MV Dayspring, also called the Corpach Wreck or the Old Boat of Caol, was a fishing trawler that ran aground at Corpach, near Fort William, Loch Linnhe, Scotland. Her wreck remains beached there, and the site is now a popular attraction for photographers and tourists.

== History ==
Dayspring was built in 1975 by J. & G. Forbes & Co. in Sandhaven, Scotland. The vessel completed sea trials in Fraserburgh on 26 June 1975 and entered service immediately thereafter.

She was operated as a pair trawler alongside Ocean Crest, captained by Louie Cardno, fishing for herring and mackerel. The vessel was renamed Golden Harvest and was skippered by Bertie Green of Fraserburgh. The vessel paired with Jim Green’s Replenish in the whitefish fishery. After Bertie Green the vessel was sold and relocated to Kilkeel, Northern Ireland where it was owned by Ernie McMath and was captained by Duncan MacInnes.

On 12 September 2000 the vessel was sold to John Boyd of Kinlochleven and returned to Scotland.

Operating as Golden Harvest the vessel undertook its final independent voyage from Kinlochleven to Kilkeel operated by James Maxtons & Co. before returning to Kinlochleven on 5 September 2001. It remained moored at Kinlochleven Pier and was not in active use. Boyd intended to convert the vessel into a floating seafood restaurant; the project was, however, abandoned.

The vessel was sold in May 2008. Dayspring remained at Kinlochleven over the winter before being moved to Camas na Gall Bay, Loch Linnhe, on 7 July 2009, where a swinging mooring was installed. On 5 May 2010 the vessel arrived at Boyd Bros. pier and remained there temporarily while a semi-dry dock was prepared. It was subsequently berthed on the east side of Corpach Harbour alongside Boyd Bros. pier on 8 September 2010 for repairs.

== Loss ==
On the 8 December 2011 a storm tore the vessel from its moorings. It beached in Loch Linnhe on a stretch of beach between the villages of Corpach and Caol where its wreck has remained ever since. The wreck has since become a popular tourist attraction and photography location in the area.

== See also ==
- SS Point Reyes
- List of shipwrecks of the United Kingdom
