= List of shipwrecks in 1977 =

The list of shipwrecks in 1977 includes ships sunk, foundered, grounded, or otherwise lost during 1977.

table of contents
1977
Jan	Feb	Mar	Apr
May	Jun	Jul	Aug
Sep	Oct	Nov	Dec
Unknown date

== January ==
=== 3 January ===
List of shipwrecks: 3 January 1977
Ship	State	Description
Salu	United States	The shrimp-fishing vessel was swamped and sank in the Gulf of Alaska approximately 20 miles (32 km) south of Cape Chiniak (57°37′N 152°10′W) on Kodiak Island.

=== 10 January ===
List of shipwrecks: 10 January 1977
Ship	State	Description
Chester A. Poling	United States	Carrying a cargo of oil, the 282-foot (86 m), 1,546-gross register ton tanker broke in half in a storm off Eastern Point at the entrance to the harbor at Gloucester, Massachusetts. Her stern section sank 800 yards (730 m) southwest of Eastern Point Light in up to 95 feet (29 m) of water at 42°34′25″N 070°40′15″W. Her bow section sank 4 nautical miles (7.4 km; 4.6 mi) east of Eastern Point in 190 feet (58 m) of water at 42°33.9′N 070°37.1′W. One crew member perished.

=== 13 January ===
List of shipwrecks: 13 January 1977
Ship	State	Description
Ivan Sechenov	Soviet Union	The cargo ship collided in foggy weather with Praktikolas Maris (Liberia) in the Sea of Marmara, Turkey and sank with the loss of twenty-two crew.
Kilsyth	United Kingdom	The 103-foot (31 m) fishing vessel was driven ashore in Whitley Bay after breaking from the tug Niparound (United Kingdom) while under tow from Aberdeen to Middlesbrough for demolition.
Turnu Severin	Romania	The cargo ship collided in fog with Admiral Zmejavic (Yugoslavia) and sank in the Dardanelles with the loss of fifteen crew.

=== 17 January ===
List of shipwrecks: 17 January 1977
Ship	State	Description
Irenes Challenger	Liberia	The oil tanker broke up in the Pacific Ocean with the loss of three crewmembers.

=== 20 January ===
List of shipwrecks: 20 January 1977
Ship	State	Description
Ukola	Panama	The Panamanian freighter Ukola broke in half and sank in the Gulf of Mexico during a gale while en route to Galveston, Texas from the Dominican Republic with a cargo of sugar. Only three of the ship's 23 crew members were rescued.

=== 23 January ===
List of shipwrecks: 23 January 1977
Ship	State	Description
Lucona	Panama	The cargo ship was sunk in the Indian Ocean by a time bomb planted as part of an insurance fraud scheme masterminded by Austrian businessman Udo Proksch. Six of the ship′s 12 crew members died.

=== 25 January ===
List of shipwrecks: 25 January 1977
Ship	State	Description
Bertram I	United States	Adrift after losing power, the Alaska Department of Public Safety patrol boat sank in heavy seas in Portage Bay (57°00′N 133°20′W) in Southeast Alaska, 21 nautical miles (39 km; 24 mi) west of Petersburg, Alaska.

=== Unknown date ===
List of shipwrecks: Unknown date 1977
Ship	State	Description
Kilsyth	United Kingdom	The out of service 103-foot (31 m), 166-ton trawler was being towed to the breakers when she ran aground in Whitley Bay. Later refloated, and scrapped.
Success Star	Panama	The Shelt-type coaster ran aground off Tumpat, Malaysia and abandoned.

== February ==
=== 2 February ===
List of shipwrecks: 2 February 1977
Ship	State	Description
Vasso M.	Greece	The cargo ship caught fire and sank in the Mediterranean Sea 2 nautical miles (2.3 mi; 3.7 km) off Borolos Lighthouse, Damietta, Egypt.

=== 7 February ===
List of shipwrecks: 7 February 1977
Ship	State	Description
Spyros G	Cyprus	The cargo ship sprang a leak and sank in the Mediterranean Sea east of Malta (35°46′N 20°05′E). She was on a voyage from Piraeus, Greece to Tripoli, Libya.

=== 13 February ===
List of shipwrecks: 13 February 1977
Ship	State	Description
Enfant du Bretagne	France	The St Malo trawler was lost on Pednathise, within the Western Rocks, Isles of Scilly. The lifeboat came within hearing distance of the crew, but all drowned in the heavy seas before they could be brought aboard.

=== 14 February ===
List of shipwrecks: 14 February 1977
Ship	State	Description
Internos	Panama	Sprang a leak and sank 3 nautical miles (5.6 km) north of Gijón (44°20′N 05°50′W).

=== 17 February ===
List of shipwrecks: 17 February 1977
Ship	State	Description
USS Stockham	United States Navy	The decommissioned Fletcher-class destroyer was sunk as a target off the coast of Puerto Rico.

=== 18 February ===
List of shipwrecks: 18 February 1977
Ship	State	Description
Atlantic Duke	West Germany	Ran aground 20 nautical miles (37 km) off Great Yarmouth, United Kingdom. All seven crew rescued.

=== 19 February ===
List of shipwrecks: 19 February 1977
Ship	State	Description
Hongkong Surety	Republic of China	Ran aground on the Angelica Shoal (7°46′S 122°17′E) and declared a constructive total loss.

=== 24 February ===
List of shipwrecks: 24 February 1977
Ship	State	Description
Hawaiian Patriot	Liberia	The oil tanker caught fire and sank in the Pacific Ocean west of Hawaii.

== March ==
=== 1 March ===
List of shipwrecks: 1 March 1977
Ship	State	Description
Viking Rover	United States	The 180-ton motor vessel lost steerage 43 nautical miles (80 km) south of Cape Sarichef, Unimak Island, Alaska, became disabled, and sank without loss of life in 40-to-50-knot (74 to 93 km/h) winds and 16-foot (4.9 m) seas in the North Pacific Ocean near Rootok Island east of Dutch Harbor, Alaska, at 54°01.79′N 165°31.02′W. A United States Coast Guard helicopter based at Kodiak, Alaska, rescued her four-man crew.

=== 6 March ===
List of shipwrecks: 9 March 1977
Ship	State	Description
St. George	Trinidad and Tobago	The tug foundered at Port of Spain, Trinidad.

=== 9 March ===
List of shipwrecks: 9 March 1977
Ship	State	Description
Saint Peter	United States	The 81-gross register ton, 62.6-foot (19.1 m) motor vessel sank in Orca Inlet off the coast of Alaska.

=== 27 March ===
List of shipwrecks: 27 March 1977
Ship	State	Description
El Tambo	Panama	The livestock carrier sank outside Fishguard Harbour, Wales.

== April ==
=== 14 April ===
List of shipwrecks: 14 April 1977
Ship	State	Description
Thomas Heyward	United States	The Liberty ship was scuttled off Destin, Florida.

=== 28 April ===
List of shipwrecks: 28 April 1977
Ship	State	Description
USS Blue	United States Navy	The decommissioned Allen M. Sumner-class destroyer was sunk as a target in the Pacific Ocean off the coast of Southern California during a missile exercise.

=== Unknown date ===
List of shipwrecks: Unknown date April 1977
Ship	State	Description
P-11	Ethiopian Navy	Eritrean War of Independence: The patrol boat was lost, with reports variously blaming the loss on a storm and on an attack by the Eritrean People's Liberation Front, or the patrol boat was sunk by the Ethiopian Air Force while trying to defect to the Eritrean People's Liberation Front.

== May ==
=== 4 May ===
List of shipwrecks: 4 May 1977
Ship	State	Description
Foremost	United States	The 166-gross register ton, 86.6-foot (26.4 m) crab-fishing vessel capsized and sank in the Bering Sea approximately 75 nautical miles (139 km; 86 mi) east-southeast of St. George Island in the direction of Cape Sarichef (54.5983°N 164.9222°W) on Unimak Island in the Aleutian Islands. The fishing vessel Sea Venture (United States) rescued her entire crew of five.

=== 5 May ===
List of shipwrecks: 5 May 1977
Ship	State	Description
Niels John	United Kingdom	The 30-foot (9.1 m) fishing vessel sank off Maughold Head, Isle of Man, 30 miles east of Ramsey.

=== 6 May ===
List of shipwrecks: 6 May 1977
Ship	State	Description
Ocean Beauty	United States	The 44-foot (13.4 m) fishing vessel sank in the Gulf of Alaska south of Marmot Island in the Kodiak Archipelago.

=== 9 May ===
List of shipwrecks: 9 May 1977
Ship	State	Description
Classic	Greece	The tanker ran aground at Wilhelmshaven, West Germany.

=== 13 May ===
List of shipwrecks: 13 May 1977
Ship	State	Description
Edgar E. Clark	United States	The Liberty ship was scuttled off the Virginia Capes.

=== 18 May ===
List of shipwrecks: 18 May 1977
Ship	State	Description
Kadina	Panama	The cargo ship foundered in a typhoon at Singapore. She was refloated on 2 September 1978 and consequently scrapped.

=== 19 May ===
List of shipwrecks: 19 May 1977
Ship	State	Description
Mar del Plata	United States	The 156-gross register ton, 79.9-foot (24.4 m) shrimp-fishing vessel sank in the Shelikof Strait between the Kodiak Archipelago and the mainland of Alaska. The fishing vessel Heidi J (United States) rescued her entire crew.

== June ==
=== 1 June ===
List of shipwrecks: 1 June 1977
Ship	State	Description
Rose	United States	The tug sank while moored at Petersburg, Alaska. She later was abandoned on the beach at Kupreanof, Alaska.
Seaspeed Dora	Greece	The roll-on/roll-off ferry capsized and sank at Jeddah, Saudi Arabia. She was refloated on 17 September and towed to Gothenburg, Sweden for repairs. She re-entered service in 1978.

=== 3 June ===
List of shipwrecks: 3 June 1977
Ship	State	Description
William Carson	Canada	The passenger/vehicle icebreaker ferry sank off the coast of Labrador after striking heavy ice.

=== 5 June ===
List of shipwrecks: 5 June 1977
Ship	State	Description
Bijou	West Germany	The coaster sank off Anglesey, Wales. All four crew were rescued.

=== 29 June ===
List of shipwrecks: 29 June 1977
Ship	State	Description
Ahaliq	United States	Bound for Kwigillingok, Alaska, carrying materials and equipment for the construction of a sewage treatment plant, the 187-gross register ton, 99.9-foot (30.4 m) tug/barge sank in heavy seas with the loss of her captain in Bristol Bay, 118 nautical miles (219 km; 136 mi) southwest of Dillingham, Alaska. The high endurance cutter USCGC Boutwell ( United States Coast Guard) rescued her survivors – four men and a Border Collie – from a life raft on 3 July.

=== Unknown date ===
List of shipwrecks: Unknown date June 1977
Ship	State	Description
USS Butternut	United States Navy	The decommissioned netlayer was destroyed as a target.

== July ==
=== 4 July ===
List of shipwrecks: 4 July 1977
Ship	State	Description
Kola Silat X	Indonesia	The VIC-type lighter foundered in the Strait of Sunda.

=== 11 July ===
List of shipwrecks: 11 July 1977
Ship	State	Description
Pacific Surf	United States	The 134-gross register ton fishing vessel sank in the Gulf of Alaska approximately 260 nautical miles (480 km; 300 mi) west of Cape Spencer, Alaska. Her crew of five abandoned ship in a life raft, where one died of a heart attack and was cast adrift. The oil tanker Overseas Chicago (United States) rescued the four remaining survivors from the raft 65 nautical miles (120 km; 75 mi) south of Cordova, Alaska.

=== 22 July ===
List of shipwrecks: 22 July 1977
Ship	State	Description
Rio Jobabo	Cuba	The fishing vessel was sunk at El Callao Peru by an explosion.

=== 25 July ===
List of shipwrecks: 25 July 1977
Ship	State	Description
Bristol	United States	The fishing vessel was swamped and sank on Long Sands Bar (58°44′N 158°32′W) in Nushagak Bay off the coast of Alaska.
Gaines Mill	United States	The T2 tanker capsized at Kaohsiung, Taiwan. The wreck was scrapped in situ.

=== 29 July ===
List of shipwrecks: 29 July 1977
Ship	State	Description
Oswego Tarmac	Panama	The T2 tanker was struck by Elektra (flag unknown) at Curaçao, Netherlands Antilles and was severely damaged. Declared a constructive total loss, she was scrapped at Santander, Spain.

== August ==
=== 16 August ===
List of shipwrecks: 16 August 1977
Ship	State	Description
Fisher	United States	The 8-gross register ton motor vessel was destroyed by fire in Southeast Alaska between Ketchikan, Alaska, and Tree Point (54°48′15″N 130°55′45″W).

=== 17 August ===
List of shipwrecks: 17 August 1977
Ship	State	Description
Lira	Singapore	The cargo ship exploded and caught fire. She sank the next day.

=== 22 August ===
List of shipwrecks: 22 August 1977
Ship	State	Description
ex-USS Rowan	Republic of China Navy	After transfer to the Republic of China Navy, the decommissioned Gearing-class destroyer ran aground while under tow from the United States to Taiwan and was declared a total loss.

=== 30 August ===
List of shipwrecks: 30 August 1977
Ship	State	Description
Quasar	United States	The 7-gross register ton motor vessel was destroyed by fire in Stephens Passage in the Alexander Archipelago in Southeast Alaska 0.5 nautical miles (0.93 km; 0.58 mi) south of the Snettisham Rocks (57°57′30″N 133°52′00″W).

=== 31 August ===
List of shipwrecks: 31 August 1977
Ship	State	Description
Unidentified fishing vessel	Vietnam	The fishing vessel was sunk by Kampuchean Navy vessels.

== September ==
=== 7 September ===
List of shipwrecks: 7 September 1977
Ship	State	Description
Indian	United States	While towing the riverboat tender Cowboy (United States), the freezer boat – formerly a ferry of the Washington State Ferries fleet – was wrecked in bad weather on Egg Island in the Egg Islands on the south-central coast of Alaska south of Cordova. Cowboy rescued all nine members of her crew.

=== 25 September ===
List of shipwrecks: 25 September 1977
Ship	State	Description
Gale	United States	The 34-foot (10.4 m) vessel sank in Malina Bay (58°13′N 153°05′W) on the coast of Afognak Island in Alaska′s Kodiak Archipelago.
Samudra Sai	India	The Victory ship was driven ashore at Tuticorin. She was subsequently refloated and scrapped.

=== 29 September ===
List of shipwrecks: 29 September 1977
Ship	State	Description
Benjamin H. Grierson	United States	The Liberty ship was scuttled off Panama City, Florida.

=== Unknown date ===
List of shipwrecks: Unknown date 1977
Ship	State	Description
Kerland	France	The trawler sank off the Runnelstone, Cornwall, United Kingdom, and was aided by the Isles of Scilly ferry Scillonian III.

== October ==
=== 3 October ===
List of shipwrecks: 3 October 1977
Ship	State	Description
Senneville	Canada	The bulk carrier ran aground at Thunder Bay, Ontario. The ship was freed the next day, suffering damage to her ballast tank.

=== 12 October ===
List of shipwrecks: 12 October 1977
Ship	State	Description
Louise	United States	The 10-gross register ton, 28.4-foot (8.7 m) fishing vessel was wrecked in Bertha Bay (57°48′N 136°21′W) in Southeast Alaska.

=== 14 October ===
List of shipwrecks: 14 October 1977
Ship	State	Description
Lula J	United States	The 11-gross register ton, 36.2-foot (11.0 m) fishing vessel was lost in Bertha Bay (57°48′N 136°21′W) in Southeast Alaska.
Wind Dance	United States	The sailing vessel sank in Resurrection Bay off Seward, Alaska. The Alaska Marine Highway motor ferry Tustumena (United States) rendered assistance to the people aboard Wind Dance.

=== 15 October ===
List of shipwrecks: 15 October 1977
Ship	State	Description
Marmot Cape	United States	The 27-gross register ton, 39.9-foot (12.2 m) fishing vessel capsized and sank with the loss of her captain in Astrolabe Bay (58°22′30″N 136°54′30″W) on the south-central coast of Alaska 14 nautical miles (26 km; 16 mi) west of Cape Spencer. A helicopter rescued the only other crewman aboard from the beach on 18 October.

=== 16 October ===
List of shipwrecks: 16 October 1977
Ship	State	Description
Chryssopigi Cross	Panama	The ship ran aground 2 nautical miles (3.7 km) off Galle, Sri Lanka (6°01′N 80°11′E) and sank.

=== 22 October ===
List of shipwrecks: 22 October 1977
Ship	State	Description
U F 22	United States	The 34-foot (10.4 m) fishing vessel and her two-man crew disappeared in the Gulf of Alaska. The fishing vessel Columbia (United States) discovered the wreckage of U F 22 washed up on Aiaktalik Beach near the south end of Kodiak Island on 2 March 1978.

=== 23 October ===
List of shipwrecks: 23 October 1977
Ship	State	Description
Carjie	United States	The 31-foot (9.4 m) vessel was wrecked on rocks on the coast of Alaska.

=== 26 October ===
List of shipwrecks: 26 October 1977
Ship	State	Description
Eagle	United States	With two people – a man and a woman – aboard, the fishing vessel sank near Dundas Bay (58.3431°N 136.3404°W) in Icy Strait in the Alexander Archipelago in Southeast Alaska. The man perished. The woman drifted in a survival suit for eight to ten hours, reached shore, and walked 60 miles (97 km) before a United States Coast Guard helicopter rescued her.

== November ==
=== 6 November ===
List of shipwrecks: 6 November 1977
Ship	State	Description
Piraeus II	Greece	The coastal tanker caught fire and sank in Eleusis Bay. She was later refloated but was declared a total loss and scrapped.

=== 8 November ===
List of shipwrecks: 8 November 1977
Ship	State	Description
Alexander Hamilton	United States	The retired 349-foot-5-inch (106.5 m) sidewheel paddle steamer burned and sank during a storm while moored at the Navy pier at Middletown Township, New Jersey.

=== 11 November ===
List of shipwrecks: 11 November 1977
Ship	State	Description
Aristoteles	Liberia	Ran aground at Sestrice Island (42°58′N 17°13′E) and declared a constructive total loss.
Deepwater Bay	Liberia	Explosion and fire while discharging cargo at Luanda, Angola. She was declared a constructive total loss and scrapped in June 1978.
Dolphin	United States	The 8- or 38-gross register ton, 41.6-foot (12.7 m) fishing vessel sank in Marmot Bay (58°00′N 152°06′W) on the coast of Alaska's Kodiak Island.

=== 15 November ===
List of shipwrecks: 15 November 1977
Ship	State	Description
CG 41332	United States Coast Guard	The 41-foot Coast Guard utility boat (UTB) capsized and sank in heavy surf on the Columbia River Bar at night with ten students from the Motor Lifeboat School aboard. Three of the students died.

=== 16 November ===
List of shipwrecks: 16 November 1977
Ship	State	Description
Union Crystal	Malaysia	The coaster sank 20 nautical miles (37 km) off St Abbs Head, United Kingdom with the loss of five of her six crew.

=== 22 November ===
List of shipwrecks: 22 November 1977
Ship	State	Description
VIC 99	United Kingdom	The floating restaurant, a converted VIC-type lighter, was severely damaged by fire at Stourport-on-Severn, Worcestershire.

=== 24 November ===
List of shipwrecks: 24 November 1977
Ship	State	Description
Vaiatea	unknown	The auxiliary schooner, a former coastal freighter, sank in a lagoon near Papeete, Tahiti.

=== 25 November ===
List of shipwrecks: 25 November 1977
Ship	State	Description
Newark	Liberia	The cargo ship was wrecked at Tripoli, Libya.

=== Unknown date ===
List of shipwrecks: Unknown date November 1977
Ship	State	Description
Bornrif, Meeuw, Stentor, Moray	Ireland	Three tugs and the fishing vessel Moray (all bought from Netherlands, but later abandoned at Kilmacalogue harbour, Kenmare River, County Kerry, Ireland) broke their moorings in a storm and were wrecked.
Hero	United Kingdom	The roll-on/roll-off cargo ferry sank in the North Sea with the loss of one crew member when her stern door lost watertight integrity.
Sea Breeze	United States	The 83-foot (25 m) dragger sank off the coast of Maine after striking something in heavy seas. Two crewmen were rescued from her life raft by a U.S. Coast Guard helicopter, and one by USCGC Duane ( United States Coast Guard) from her skiff. Two crewmen died.

== December ==
=== 2 December ===
List of shipwrecks: 3 December 1977
Ship	State	Description
Blue Bell	Saudi Arabia	A Saudi Arabian general cargo vessel was sailing from Jeddah to Port Sudan with her cargo of Toyota vehicles and spare parts when she struck the reef about 75 kilometres (47 mi) north of Port Sudan.

=== 3 December ===
List of shipwrecks: 3 December 1977
Ship	State	Description
Baron	United States	The fishing vessel grounded and was lost in the Bering Sea off Cape Cheerful (54°00′50″N 166°40′20″W) on Unalaska Island in the Aleutian Islands. The Alaska State Trooper patrol vessel Vigilant (United States) rescued the eight people – four men, three women, and an infant – on board.
Empire Rosa	United Kingdom	The Nodified-Sttella type tug was driven ashore in Luce Bay. She was refloated but declared a constructive total loss and consequently scrapped.

=== 4 December ===
List of shipwrecks: 4 December 1977
Ship	State	Description
Rainer	United States	The fishing vessel grounded and was wrecked in the Bering Sea approximately 12 nautical miles (22 km; 14 mi) off Cape Cheerful (54°00′50″N 166°40′20″W) on Unalaska Island in the Aleutian Islands.

=== 6 December ===
List of shipwrecks: 6 December 1977
Ship	State	Description
Empire Rosa	United Kingdom	Ran aground at Luce Bay, Galloway, became a constructive total loss and later scrapped.

=== 7 December ===
List of shipwrecks: 7 December 1977
Ship	State	Description
Boston Sea Ranger	United Kingdom	A Lowestoft trawler foundered off Gwennap Head, Cornwall during a southerly gale.

=== 9 December ===
List of shipwrecks: 9 December 1977
Ship	State	Description
Elinor Viking	United Kingdom	An Aberdeen trawler wrecked on the Ve Skerries, Shetland in adverse weather conditions. A volunteer helicopter crew was assembled at Sumburgh Airport which rescued all 8 crew.

=== 20 December ===
List of shipwrecks: 20 December 1977
Ship	State	Description
Emmanuel C	Greece	Ran aground on the Île d'Orléans, Quebec, Canada, refloated but declared damaged beyond economical repair and Scrapped in October 1978.

=== 25 December ===
List of shipwrecks: 25 December 1977
Ship	State	Description
Lady Camilla	Denmark	The coaster sank off Cornwall, United Kingdom with loss of life including two children.

=== 27 December ===
List of shipwrecks: 27 December 1977
Ship	State	Description
Conqueror	United Kingdom	The Grimsby trawler, on her first voyage after a major refit, went ashore at Penzer Point, south of Mousehole, Cornwall. It is believed the crew were down below having breakfast and the trawler was on automatic pilot. The Penlee Lifeboat had insufficient power to tow Conqueror off the rocks and she assumed a 35° list and broke up on the rocks.

=== 31 December ===
List of shipwrecks: 31 December 1977
Ship	State	Description
Tiran	Spain	Tiran in 2011 The cargo ship, on a voyage from Banjul, Gambia to Las Palmas, Gran Canaria, Spain, foundered 1.5 nautical miles (2.8 km; 1.7 mi) off Joal, Senegal and became a wreck on Palmarin Beach.

== Unknown date ==
List of shipwrecks: Unknown date 1977
Ship	State	Description
Banshee	United States	The 11-gross register ton, 28.9-foot (8.8 m) fishing vessel was wrecked on the coast of Kodiak Island in Alaska.
Himma	Australia	The Near-Warrior type tug was scuttled in the Tasman Sea off New South Wales.
Transport	Norway	The cargo ship ran aground at Godøystraumen. She was refloated.
Unidentified railroad barge	United States	The retired 200-foot (61.0 m) railroad barge was scuttled as an artificial reef in the North Atlantic Ocean 3.6 nautical miles (6.7 km; 4.1 mi) off Sea Girt, New Jersey, in 70 feet (21 m) of water at 40°06.986′N 073°56.868′W.
Webster	United States	The Liberty ship was scuttled off Cape Henry, Virginia.
