= SS Ben Doran =

Steam fishing trawler that operated out of Aberdeen

History
- Name: Ben Doran
- Owner: Irvin, Richard & Sons – Prince Steam Fishing Co., Ltd., North Shields (1900 – 1908); Davidson Thomas, Aberdeen (1908 – 1915); Royal Navy (1915 – 1920); Davidson Thomas, Aberdeen (1920 – 1925); Lewis, John & Sons, Aberdeen (1925 – 1930)
- Port of registry: United Kingdom (Aberdeen)
- Builder: Hall, Russell & Company, Aberdeen
- Yard number: 331
- Launched: 3 March 1900
- In service: 1900 – 1930
- Identification: Official number: 112912; A178
- Fate: Wrecked on Ve Skerries 29 March 1930

General characteristics
- Type: Fishing trawler
- Tonnage: 155 GRT
- Length: 34 m (111 ft 7 in)
- Beam: 6.1 m (20 ft 0 in)
- Depth: 3.7 m (12 ft 2 in)
- Propulsion: Steam
- Crew: ~9

SS Ben Doran was a steam fishing trawler that operated out of Aberdeen, Scotland. It was launched in 1900 and operated until its wrecking on the Ve Skerries, Shetland, on 29 March 1930, which claimed the lives of the full crew, believed to number nine crew members. Its wrecking has been called "the most tragic wreck in all Shetland's history".

== Description ==
Ben Doran was built by shipbuilders Hall, Russell & Company of Aberdeen, and it was launched on 3 March 1900. The steel vessel was built to a length of 34 metres (112 ft), a beam of 6.1 metres (20 ft), and a depth of 3.7 metres (12 ft). The gross tonnage was 155 GRT, and it was fitted with a steam engine.

== Wrecking ==
On 29 March 1930, the Aberdeen steam trawler Ben Doran ran aground on the north end of Heligoblo, Ve Skerries, northwest of the island of Papa Stour, Shetland, in bad weather and rough sea conditions, due in part to poor coverage in nautical charts of the area, and lack of knowledge of the tides around the shallow reef surrounding the Ve Skerries which were considered unpredictable even to experienced Shetland fishermen. Another passing trawler brought news of the accident to Lerwick by 5pm, after which the Stromness Lifeboat Station in Orkney was notified, and Board of Trade's life-saving apparatus - a rocket propelled rope to shoot to another vessel, to allow for it to be towed to safety - was arranged and taken by lorry to Ronas Voe. The apparatus was taken aboard the steam trawler Arora and it departed towards the Ve Skerries at 2am on 30 March.

Honorary Secretary of the RNLI's Lerwick branch, George Theodore Kay, who was aware of the geography of the Ve Skerries, thought that a ship the size of Arora would struggle to come close enough to Ben Doran to effect a rescue attempt. He learned that a smaller motor boat named Smiling Morn was berthed in Voe, Delting, and suggested that this vessel accompanied by a four-oared rowing boat would have a better chance at success. He, with John Falconer, master of the trawler Boscobell, and W. H. Dougall from The Missions to Seamen proceeded to Voe and enrolled the assistance of Smiling Morn. They headed for Housa Voe, Papa Stour to procure the expertise of someone there with experience of the seabed around the Ve Skerries. By entering Housa Voe in rough conditions and during the night, they themselves nearly collided with a sunken rock. Upon landfall in Housa Voe they enlisted the assistance of John Henderson, and headed towards the Ve Skerries.

Smiling Morn arrived before 5am at the Ve Skerries, which Arora had reached first. Heavy seas and high winds continued and proved to make a very difficult rescue attempt. Five of Ben Doran's crew were seen clinging to the ship's rigging while sea spray hit them. Arora made an approach, however they only reached in far enough that their crew thought that they would not be able to return to safety, and still Ben Doran was out of reach. Retreating, they relayed that an additional two crewmembers were spotted in the rigging. Ben Doran's position in the middle of the skerries (being 600 yards (550 m) west from the nearest skerry) meant there was no plausible means of rescue, owing to the shallow reef surrounding it. Kay, who examined the area 2 months later, commented that it was "abundantly clear that rescue would have been hopeless".

At one point a "tide lump" (Shetland dialect: a rapid escalation of tidal activity) fell into the 20-foot (6.1 m) rowing boat which Smiling Morn had in tow, and it sank. Smiling Morn's skipper, John Jamieson, was adamant in attempting a rescue despite the danger to his own crew, and due to this a fight nearly broke out upon the ship, leading the rest of the crew to tie him up to keep him from doing so. Despite the effort put in by the crew of each of the would-be rescue vessels, they resolved that nothing more could be done and so they abandoned the rescue.

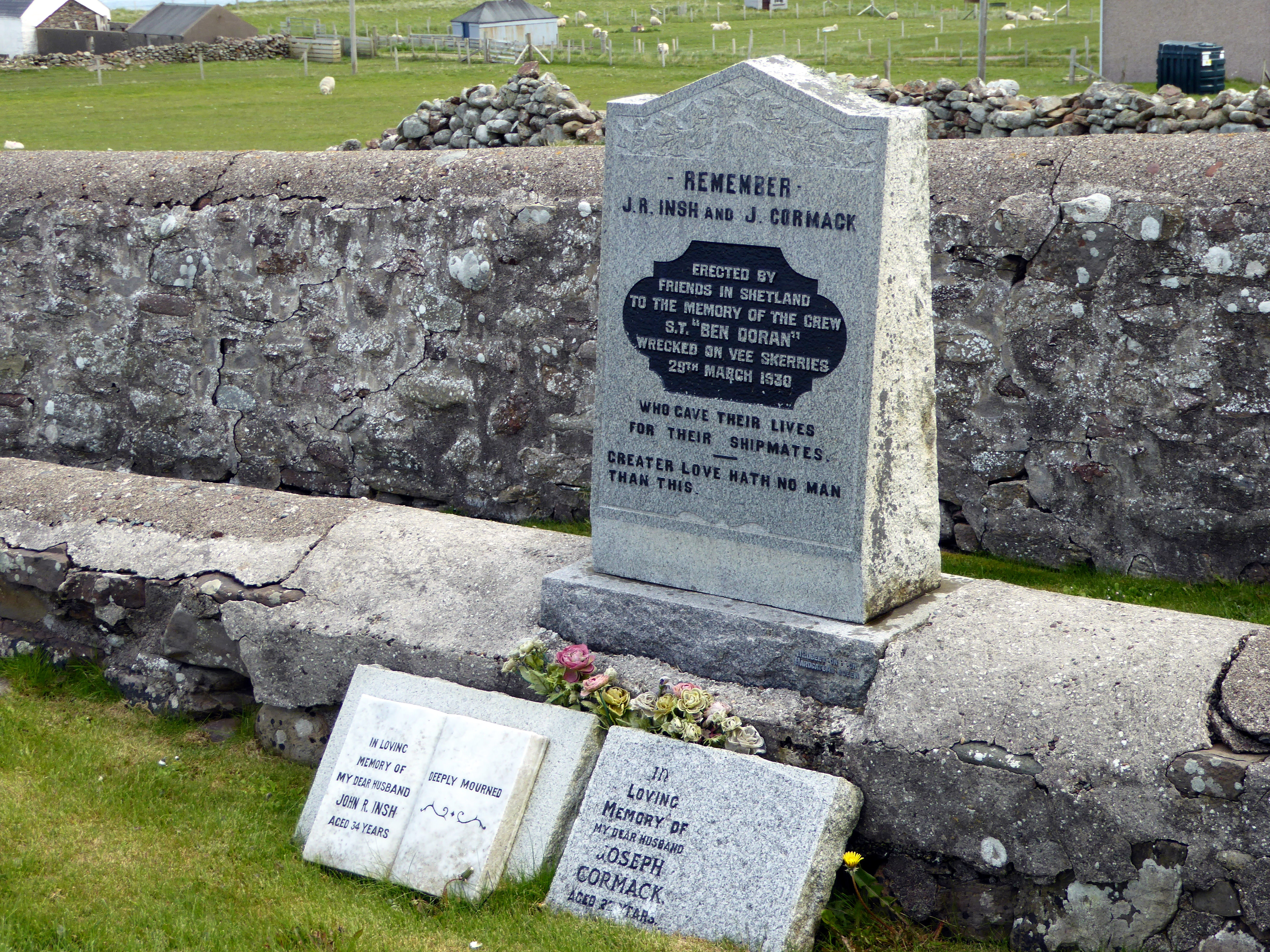
Memorial dedicated to the crew of Ben Doran, Melby Cemetery

The Stromness Lifeboat Station was alerted to the unsuccessful attempt by 4pm 30 March. By 4:45pm the Stromness Lifeboat departed, reaching Scalloway by 7:30am on 31 March. By the time the lifeboat arrived at the Ve Skerries, only the gallows for supporting the ship's anchor could be seen. All of the nine crew members believed to have been on board were killed. The wrecking of Ben Doran and the deaths of the crew validated the need for a lifeboat to be stationed in Shetland. In 1933 the Aith Lifeboat Station was opened.

The wreck of the Ben Doran is used as a dive site for sport divers and underwater photographers.

== See also ==
- Ve Skerries
- List of shipwrecks in 1930
- List of shipwrecks of the United Kingdom

== Sources ==
- Gott, Tony, ed. (2 March 2008). "George Theodore Kay". North Isles Family History (bayanne.info/Shetland). I108505.
- Graham, John J. (2010b) [1979]. "Tide-lumps". Shetland ForWirds.
- "A Short History of the Life Saving Apparatus" (PDF). A History of South Shields Volunteer Life Brigade.
- "Ben Doran: Helligoblo, Ve Skerries, Atlantic". Canmore.
- "Ben Doran Nameplate". Shetland Museum and Archives.
- "Diving". Shetland.org.
- "FV Ben Doran (A178) (+1930)". The Wrecksite. 6 May 2018.
- "Station History". Royal National Lifeboat Institution (RNLI).
- "Two Wrecks in the Shetlands" (PDF). The Lifeboat. XXVIII: 66–69. June 1930 – via RNLI Archive.
