= MFV Elinor Viking =

History
- Name: Elinor Viking
- Owner: Brown H. N. & Son, Aberdeen
- Port of registry: United Kingdom (Aberdeen)
- Builder: Lewis John & Sons Ltd., Aberdeen
- Yard number: 388
- Completed: 1974
- In service: 1974-1977
- Identification: IMO number: 7342770; A279
- Fate: Wrecked on Ve Skerries, Shetland 9 December 1977

General characteristics
- Type: Trawler
- Tonnage: 122 GRT
- Length: 23.5 metres (77 ft)
- Beam: 6.7 metres (22 ft)
- Depth: 3.4 metres (11 ft)
- Propulsion: 1 × 6-cylinder Mirrlees Blackstone diesel engine, single shaft, 1 screw
- Speed: 11 knots (20 km/h; 13 mph)
- Crew: 8

MFV Elinor Viking was an Aberdeen trawler that operated between 1974 and 9 December 1977 when it wrecked on the Ve Skerries, Shetland. The eight crewmembers were rescued by a volunteer helicopter crew from Sumburgh Airport.

== Description ==
Elinor Viking was built by Lewis John & Sons Ltd., of Aberdeen, and was completed in 1974. The steel vessel was built to a length of 23.5 metres (77 ft), a beam of 6.7 metres (22 ft) and a depth of 3.4 metres (11 ft). The gross tonnage was 122 GRT. The vessel was fitted with a 6-cylinder Mirrlees Blackstone diesel engine (single shaft, 1 screw), capable of a speed of 11 knots (20 km/h; 13 mph). The ship was owned by Brown H. N. & Son, also of Aberdeen.

== Wrecking ==
On 9 December 1977 Elinor Viking was wrecked on the east side of Reaverack, Ve Skerries, Shetland due to extreme weather conditions. The Aith Lifeboat was sent to the scene, however due to the wreck's position it was not able to get close enough to the vessel to transfer to the crew to safety. Both of the ship's liferafts had been swept away by the sea, and the ship had been breached and lay half-filled with water. An appeal was made to Sumburgh Airport where British Airways had helicopters stationed, and a volunteer crew was assembled, including Captain George Bain as the chief pilot, and Major Alasdair Campbell as a winchman and Petty Officer Brian Johnstone as winch operator.

They reached the scene within about an hour and, with the aid of another helicopter and an RAF Nimrod trying to provide light in the dark conditions, they proceeded with the rescue attempt in horrendous weather. The light coming from dropped flares from the Nimrod was deemed impossible to time correctly with the winch lowering, such that their only effective source of light was the helicopter's landing lights. Elinor Viking had developed considerable list as it began to sink. Campbell, upon his first attempt being lowered down to the ship, was unexpectedly swayed and his cable became caught in the mast of the ship. The risk of losing the helicopter meant that the winch operator Johnstone nearly had to take the decision to sever the cable to Campbell, however he was able to be retrieved back into the helicopter and immediately offered to be lowered again. Using a rock which was repeatedly out of view with the swell as the best reference, Bain was able to keep the aircraft steady to continue the rescue. Through the following hour and twenty minutes, lowering approximately twelve times, Johnstone was able to hoist up Campbell and the crew. The last to leave the ship was the skipper, who (either through hypothermia or shock) could not let go of the ship's railing, requiring Campbell to hit him to continue the rescue.

Despite the crew of the helicopter not being trained for rescue work, all 8 of Elinor Viking's crew were successfully winched to safety. Both Bain and Campbell and Johnstone received Queen's Gallantry Medals for "outstanding bravery, skill and determination in conditions of extreme weather and darkness operating in a situation far beyond that normally expected of a helicopter on rescue service."

== See also ==
- Ve Skerries
- List of shipwrecks in 1977
- List of shipwrecks of the United Kingdom

== Sources ==
- "Award to "Elinor Viking" heroes - Department of Trade Rescue Shield for 1977" (PDF). Reardon Smith Line Limited Newsletters. No. 99. April 1978. p. 3.
- "Elinor Viking: Reverack, Ve Skerries, Atlantic". Canmore.
- "Honours and Awards". The London Gazette. No. 47582. Her Majesty's Stationery Office. 4 July 1978. pp. 8045–8046. ISBN 0-11-657582-4.
- "Major Alasdair Campbell". The Telegraph. 2 December 2012.
- "MFV Elinor Viking (A279) [+1977]". Wrecksite. 26 June 2015.
