= Ve Skerries =

Small islands in the west of Shetland

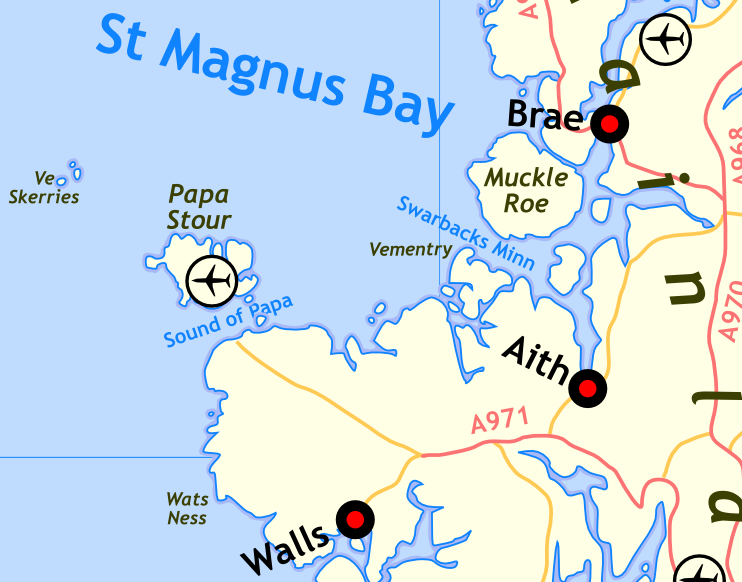
Map showing the Ve Skerries

The Ve Skerries or Vee Skerries (Shaetlan pronunciation: [də 'viː skɛriz] də VEE skeh-reez; Old Norse: Vestan sker, West Skerries) are a group of low skerries (rocky islands) three miles (4.8 km) north west of Papa Stour, on the west coast of Shetland, Scotland. They define the southwest perimeter of St Magnus Bay. They are notorious for shipwrecks, which led to the construction of a lighthouse in 1979. In local folklore, they are said to be a retreat for selkies. The lighthouse was built following the loss of the trawler Elinor Viking and to serve increased shipping for the Sullom Voe oil terminal.

== Skerries ==
The skerries are:

- North Skerry
- Ormal (Norn: ormel - remnant or fragment)
- The Clubb (Shetland dialect: hill square in shape, from Norn: klobb - crag or rugged hill-top)
- Reaverack
- Helligoblo

== Ve Skerries Lighthouse ==
Ve Skerries lighthouse
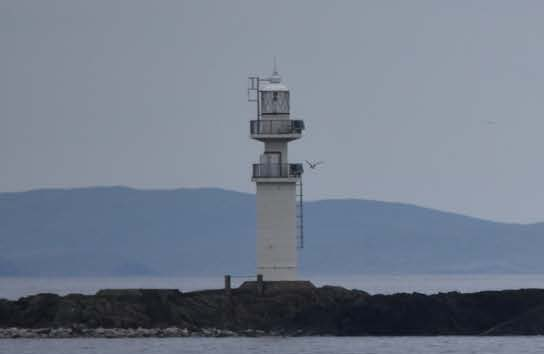
- Location: Ve Skerries; Papa Stour; Shetland; Scotland; United Kingdom
- OS grid: HU1045065473
- Coordinates: 60.3731°N 1.8123°W

Tower
- Constructed: 1979
- Construction: concrete tower
- Automated: 1979
- Height: 14.6 metres (48 ft)
- Shape: cylindrical tower with double balcony and lantern
- Markings: white tower and lantern
- Operator
- Heritage: category B listed building

Light
- First lit: 27 September 1979
- Focal height: 17 metres (56 ft)
- Light source: batteries power
- Range: 11 miles (18 km)
- Characteristic: Fl (2) W20s.

This modern lighthouse on the west side of Ormal was erected following the loss of Elinor Viking. It replaced a lighted buoy itself put in place after the loss of Ben Doran. It was also put in place to serve the increase in shipping brought about by the construction of Sullom Voe oil terminal.

Built by engineer R. J. MacKay, the lighthouse was first lit on 27 September 1979. The tower is anchored with 18 steel bars, which are secured between 10–16 feet (3.0–4.9 m) into the skerry below. It was built to tolerate forces from the sea of up to 2 long tons per square foot (22 t/m^{2}) at the base, and 0.5 long tons per square foot (5.5 t/m^{2}) at the peak. Despite its remote location, construction only took four months with the aid of helicopters, whereas using conventional techniques might have made construction take a matter of years. The use of post-tensioning in the lighthouse's construction was the first example of the technique's use in Scotland. In 2020 the lighthouse was nominated to become a Category B listed building.

The lighthouse is not open to the public; its exposed location makes landings by sea difficult.

== Wrecks ==
Due to the low depth of water in the vicinity, and unpredictable currents, the Ve Skerries are notorious for their danger to passing ships. Many ships have wrecked on the rocks.

Wrecks on the Ve Skerries
Vessel	From	Type	Date wrecked	Casualties	Ref
Unknown (Note: Presumed to have wrecked on the Ve Skerries)		Whaler	1602		
Unknown			1725		
Unknown			1748		
Unknown			c. 1762		
True Blue	(England) Liverpool	Brig	≤ 1850	Full crew killed	
Turquoise	Shetland	Cutter	2 October 1872	Full crew killed	
Unknown		Barque	30 October 1880		
Unknown			September 1883		
Nor	(Norway) Arendal	Barque	3 January 1892	Full crew of 8 killed	
Unknown		Barque	1892		
Illeri	(Norway) Sandefjord	Brig (Note: Originally built as a brigantine but modified to a brig in 1907)	9 May 1909	0	
Ben Doran	(Scotland) Aberdeen	Steam trawler	29 March 1930	Full crew of ~9 killed	
Elinor Viking	(Scotland) Aberdeen	Diesel trawler	9 December 1977	0	
Coelleira	(Scotland) Oban (Note: Vessel was Spanish-owned, but registered in the UK)	Fishing vessel	4 August 2019	0	

=== Illeri ===
While travelling between the Faroe Islands and Leith in ballast under the command of Captain Samuelson, Illeri went aground on the northeast end of the Ve Skerries early in the morning of Sunday 9 May 1909 due to poor visibility in thick fog. The conditions were calm enough to allow the crew to consider abandoning ship in a smaller boat kept aboard. When the ship started breaking up, the ship's papers were gathered and it was abandoned. The boat was directed to Muckle Roe, where they were redirected to Olnafirth where the Norwegian Olna Whaling Station was based, to which they safely arrived.

On the same morning, a report from Sandness reached Divisional Officer Mr Rogers at Fort Charlotte, Lerwick that the ship had wrecked. He summoned the Northern Lighthouse Commissioners' steamship Pole Star (which was leaving port) by semaphore to return and conveyed the report to the chief officer. Pole Star then proceeded to the Ve Skerries, where they found the ship waterlogged and abandoned. The ships' state indicated it had been quickly abandoned - The Orkney Herald reported that "they found the sails merely clued up, but not stowed, the side lights burning, and a 24 hour alarm timepiece lying on the cabin table still going." They were able to retrieve more of the ship's papers still aboard the vessel, which were passed on to the Receiver of Wreck in Scalloway. The following day Pole Star learned the crew had arrived in Olnafirth while delivering supplies to Muckle Roe.

Some of the Illeri crew (including the captain) visited the wreck again on Monday 10 May, however the ship was by then "a total wreck". The crew were forwarded on to Lerwick on 11 May, and were then sent by the Norwegian Consul to Leith aboard SS Queen on Thursday 13 May.

=== Ben Doran ===
On 29 March 1930, the Aberdeen steam trawler Ben Doran ran aground on the north end of Heligoblo in bad weather and rough sea conditions, due in part to poor coverage in nautical charts of the area, and lack of knowledge of the tides around the shallow reef surrounding the Ve Skerries which were considered unpredictable even to experienced Shetland fishermen. Another passing trawler brought news of the accident to Lerwick by 5pm, after which the Stromness Lifeboat Station in Orkney was notified, and Board of Trade's life-saving apparatus - a rocket propelled rope to shoot to another vessel, to allow for it to be towed to safety - was arranged and taken by lorry to Ronas Voe. The apparatus was taken aboard the steam trawler Arora and it departed towards the Ve Skerries at 2am on 30 March.

Honorary Secretary of the RNLI's Lerwick branch, George Theodore Kay, who was aware of the geography of the Ve Skerries, thought that a ship the size of Arora would struggle to come close enough to Ben Doran to effect a rescue attempt. He learned that a smaller motor boat named Smiling Morn was berthed in Voe, Delting, and suggested that this vessel accompanied by a four-oared rowing boat would have a better chance at success. He, with John Falconer, master of the trawler Boscobell, and W. H. Dougall from The Missions to Seamen proceeded to Voe and enrolled the assistance of Smiling Morn. They headed for Housa Voe, Papa Stour to procure the expertise of someone there with experience of the seabed around the Ve Skerries. By entering Housa Voe in rough conditions and during the night, they themselves nearly collided with a sunken rock. Upon landfall in Housa Voe they enlisted the assistance of John Henderson, and headed towards the Ve Skerries.

Smiling Morn arrived before 5am at the Ve Skerries, which Arora had reached first. Heavy seas and high winds continued and proved to make a very difficult rescue attempt. Five of Ben Doran's crew were seen clinging to the ship's rigging while sea spray hit them. Arora made an approach, however they only reached in far enough that their crew thought that they would not be able to return to safety, and still Ben Doran was out of reach. Retreating, they relayed that an additional two crewmembers were spotted in the rigging. Ben Doran's position in the middle of the skerries (being 600 yards (550 m) west from the nearest skerry) meant there was no plausible means of rescue, owing to the shallow reef surrounding it. Kay, who examined the area 2 months later, commented that it was "abundantly clear that rescue would have been hopeless."

At one point a "tide lump" (Shetland dialect: a rapid escalation of tidal activity) fell into the 20-foot (6.1 m) rowing boat which Smiling Morn had in tow, and it sank. Smiling Morn's skipper, John Jamieson, was adamant in attempting a rescue despite the danger to his own crew, and due to this a fight nearly broke out upon the ship, leading the rest of the crew to tie him up to keep him from doing so. Despite the effort put in by the crew of each of the would-be rescue vessels, they resolved that nothing more could be done and so they abandoned the rescue.

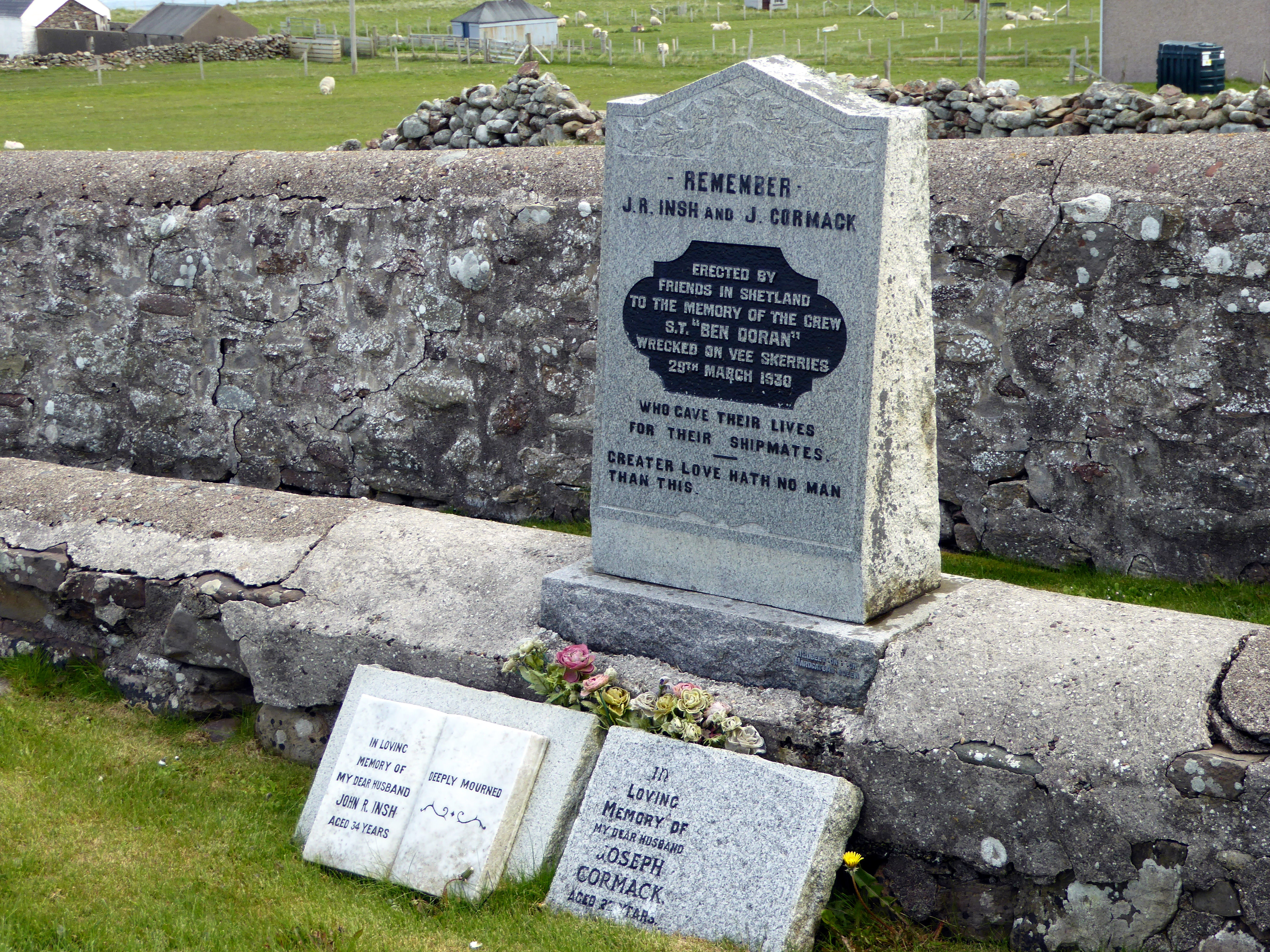
Tombstones dedicated the crew of Ben Doran in the Melby Cemetery

The Stromness Lifeboat Station was alerted to the unsuccessful attempt by 4pm 30 March. By 4:45pm the Stromness Lifeboat departed, reaching Scalloway by 7:30am on 31 March. By the time the lifeboat arrived at the Ve Skerries, only the gallows for supporting the ship's anchor could be seen. All of the nine crew members believed to have been on board were killed. The wrecking of Ben Doran and the deaths of the crew validated the need for a lifeboat to be stationed in Shetland. In 1933 the Aith Lifeboat Station was opened.

The wreck of the Ben Doran is used as a dive site for sport divers and underwater photographers.

=== Elinor Viking ===
On 9 December 1977 Elinor Viking, an Aberdeen trawler was wrecked on the east side of Reaverack due to extreme weather conditions. The Aith Lifeboat was sent to the scene, however due to the wreck's position it was not able to get close enough to the vessel to transfer to the crew to safety. Both of the ship's liferafts had been swept away by the sea, and the ship had been breached and lay half-filled with water. An appeal was made to Sumburgh Airport where British Airways had helicopters stationed, and a volunteer crew was assembled, including Captain George Bain as the chief pilot, and Major Alasdair Campbell as a winchman.

They reached the scene within about an hour and, with the aid of another helicopter and an RAF Nimrod trying to provide light in the dark conditions, they proceeded with the rescue attempt in horrendous weather. The light coming from dropped flares from the Nimrod was deemed impossible to time correctly with the winch lowering, such that their only effective source of light was the helicopter's landing lights. Elinor Viking had developed considerable list as it began to sink. Campbell, upon his first attempt being lowered down to the ship, was unexpectedly swayed and his cable became caught in the mast of the ship. The risk of losing the helicopter meant that the winch operator nearly took the decision to sever the cable to Campbell, however he was able to be retrieved back into the helicopter and immediately offered to be lowered again. Using a rock which was repeatedly out of view with the swell as the best reference, Bain was able to keep the aircraft steady to continue the rescue. Through the following hour and twenty minutes, lowering approximately twelve times, Campbell was able to hoist up the crew. The last to leave the ship was the skipper, who (either through hypothermia or shock) could not let go of the ships railing, requiring Campbell to hit him to continue the rescue.

Despite the crew of the helicopter not being trained for rescue work, all 8 of Elinor Viking's crew were successfully winched to safety. Both Bain and Campbell received Queen's Gallantry Medals for "outstanding bravery, skill and determination in conditions of extreme weather and darkness operating in a situation far beyond that normally expected of a helicopter on rescue service."

=== Coelleira ===
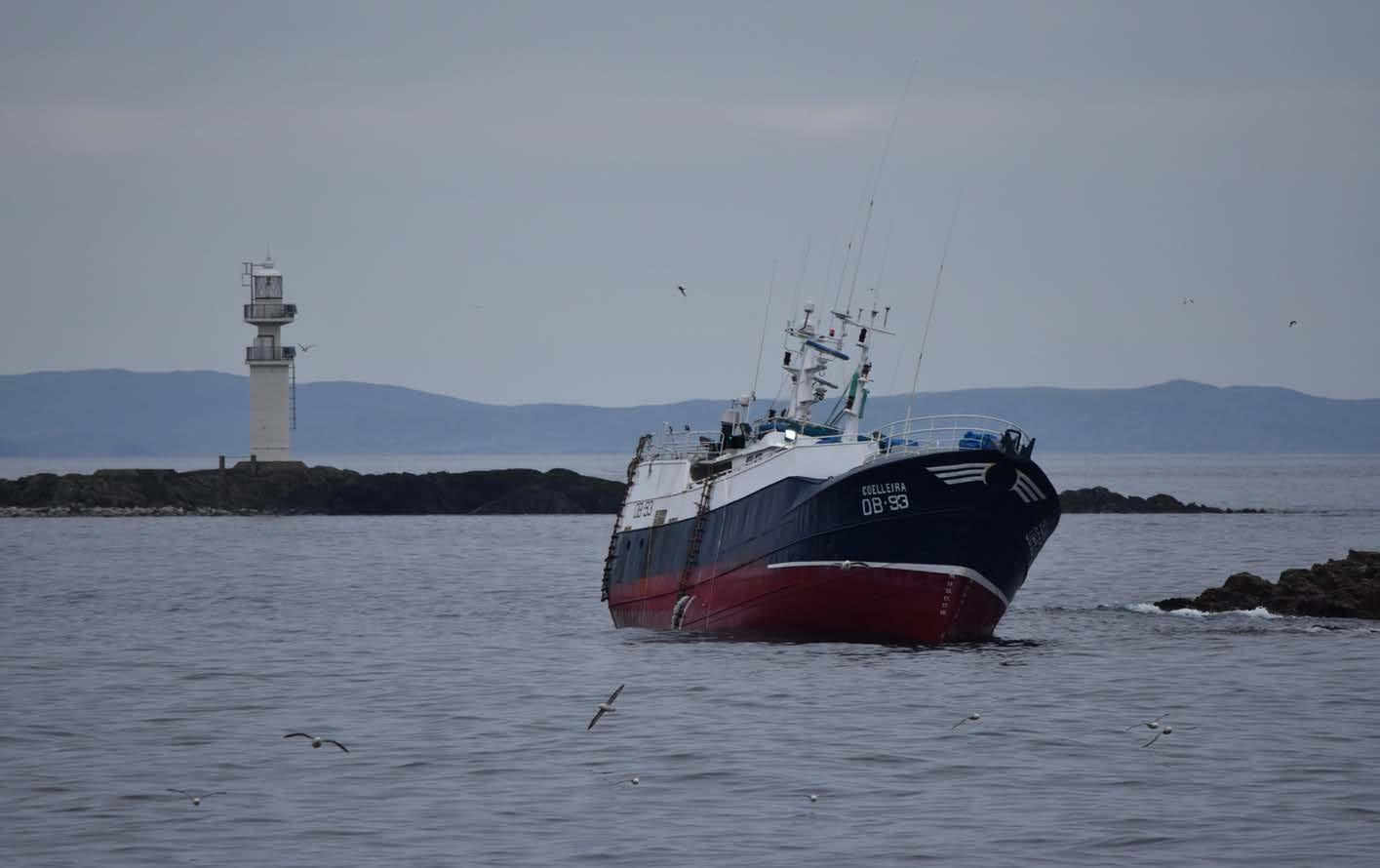
Coelleira aground on the Clubb before the salvage attempt

Late on 3 August 2019, the UK-registered, Spanish-owned fishing vessel Coelleira was returning to Scrabster from about 18 nautical miles (33 km; 21 mi) north of Yell Sound's entrance with a catch of approximately 15 tonnes of fish. Apart from the low light, the conditions were ideal - there was clear visibility, smooth seas and light winds. With the intention of returning as quickly as possible (due to unexpected delays in their fishing operations), the ship's mate set the vessel on a heading of 184° and proceeded at a speed of 9 knots (17 km/h; 10 mph) to keep close to the coast in order to save time. At 21:42 the heading was set to 204°.

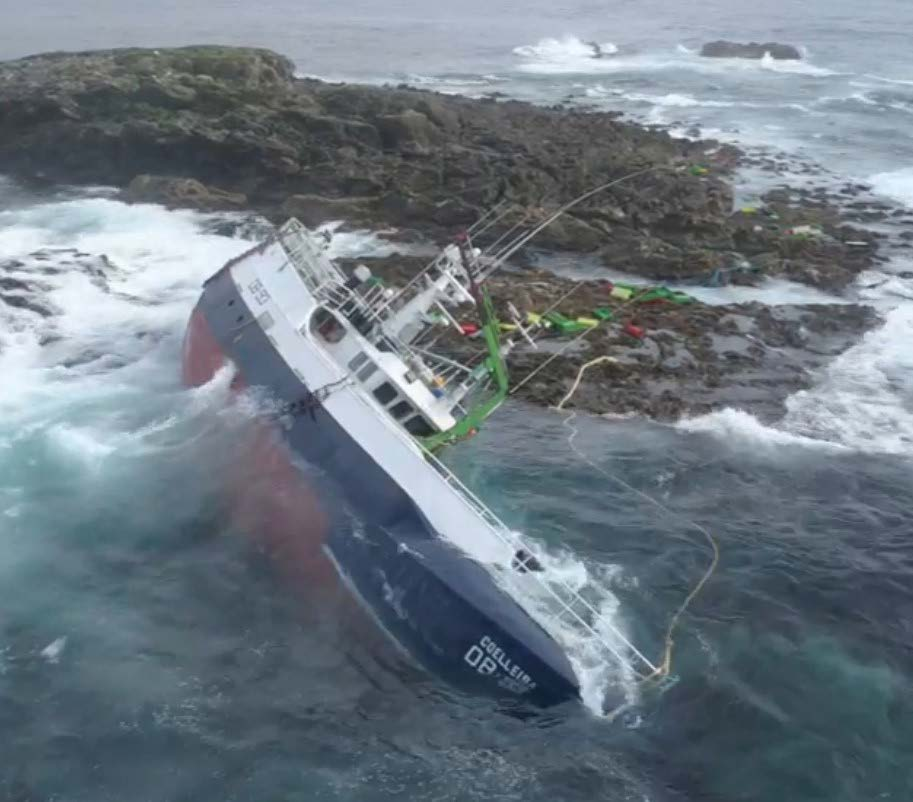
Coelleira on its port side after the salvage attempt

At 22:30 the skipper (a 56-year-old Spanish national) took over watch from the mate, who went to bed. The skipper over the next 2 hours made five adjustments to the ships' heading in order to follow the coast. The skipper during this time worked on fish landing records and other managerial work. It is not known how often the vessel's position was checked.

At 00:23 on 4 August, vessel was set to heading of 206° with the aim of keeping around 3.5 nautical miles (6.5 km; 4.0 mi) away from any navigational risk. The skipper did not see any hazards on the chartplotter, and while he did see a lighthouse light towards the port bow, he assumed it was a lighthouse on the mainland.

At an unspecified time, the skipper left the wheelhouse, and (according to a Marine Accident Investigation Branch report) while the skipper was returning to his post at 01:24, Coelleira ran aground on the Clubb travelling at 10 knots (19 km/h; 12 mph). The crew awoke with the sound of the collision, whereupon they assembled in the wheelhouse and donned survival suits and life jackets. Two lifeboats were launched off the starboard side. At 01:29 the Shetland Coastguard were notified of the accident, and in response the Aith lifeboat and a rescue helicopter were sent to the scene. All 15 crew were winched aboard the helicopter, and were returned to Lerwick uninjured.

Attempts were subsequently made to refloat the vessel. The ship was surveyed with assistance from the Sullom Voe Terminal tug Tystie, however during the inspection the vessel rolled 5-10° to port, at which point the men aboard were evacuated. The emergency towing vessel Ievoli Black attempted to pull Coelleira off the Clubb on 7 August, however during the attempt the ship tilted over 55° to port, and with a forecast of poor sea conditions and weather the ship was deemed unsalvageable. In the following days the ship broke up and sank.

In its report on the incident, the Marine Accident Investigation Branch concluded that the planning of the passage between the fishing grounds and Scrabster was inadequate, the ship's position was not kept track of, and bridge was empty when the ship went aground. They posed that the skipper's decision making may have been impacted by fatigue, while the set up of the bridge's controls may have made it more difficult to observe risks to the ship.

== Folklore ==
Following his tour of Shetland, Samuel Hibbert reported that the Ve Skerries were recounted by Shetlanders as being a retreat of the "Haaf-fish" (more commonly known as selkies) - creatures that would take the appearance of seal, but could take off their skins and would appear human, allowing them to fraternise on land. Because seal clubbing was (in the past) practised, and because seals would tend to lie on the Ve Skerries, the islanders of Papa Stour would go there to hunt the seals for the purpose of retrieving their skins, and according to these tales, would sometimes end up hunting the selkies.

One such tale attested that a seal hunter in a party of several, after killing and skinning several seals, was caught out by a sudden swell which caused the rest of the group to assemble in their boat, but left him stranded. Despite trying to rescue him, he had to be abandoned due to the worsening weather. Several selkies (in the form of seals) then landed on the Ve Skerries, took off their skins and proceeded to rescue those of their kind who had been clubbed, stunned and skinned by the hunters. Those who had been skinned began to regain consciousness, and expressed their sorrow over the loss of their only way to return home (each selkie only possessing a single skin). In particular, one selkie named Ollavitinus would not be able to return to his wives and would be imprisoned on land. When the stranded hunter was spotted, Ollavitinus' mother Gioga offered to transport him back to Papa Stour as long as he would return her son's skin, which the hunter agreed to. With the weather worsening, the hunter feared he would not be able to hold on to the seal skin of Gioga all the way back, and pleaded to be allowed to cut holes in her skin to which he could hold, to which Gioga complied. The hunter was successfully transported to Akers Geo, Papa Stour, after which he dutifully retrieved Ollavitinus' skin from a skeo (Shetland dialect: a hut of loosely constructed stone for wind-drying meat or fish) in Hamnavoe, allowing him to return to the sea and his wives.

== See also ==
- List of lighthouses in Scotland
- List of Northern Lighthouse Board lighthouses
- List of shipwrecks of the United Kingdom
- MFV Elinor Viking
- MV Coelleira
- Out Skerries
- Papa Stour
- Selkie
- SS Ben Doran
- St Magnus Bay
- SV Illeri

== General sources ==
- Allen, Tony (6 May 2018). "FV Ben Doran (A178) (+1930)". The Wrecksite.
- Cope, Chris (5 November 2020). "Remote lighthouse could become listed building". Shetland News.
- Gott, Tony, ed. (2 March 2008). "George Theodore Kay". North Isles Family History (bayanne.info/Shetland).
- Graham, John J. (2010a) [1979]. "skeo". Shetland ForWirds.
- Graham, John J. (2010b) [1979]. "Tide-lumps". Shetland ForWirds.
- Hibbert, Samuel (1822). A Description of the Shetland Islands, Comprising an Account of their Geology, Scenery, Antiquities, and Superstitions (1st ed.). Edinburgh: Archibald Constable and Co – via archive.org.
- Jakobsen, Jakob (1928). An etymological dictionary of the Norn language in Shetland (2 volumes.). Printed by S. L. Møller, Copenhagen. Foreword by Anna Horsböl, née Jakobsen. Originally published in Danish as Etymologisk ordbog over det norröne sprog på Shetland. Reprinted Lerwick: The Shetland Folk Society, 1985 (1st ed.). Shaftesbury Avenue, London: David Nutt (A. G. Berry). pp. 433, 640 – via archive.org.
- Jakobsen, Jakob (1897). "The old Shetland place-names". The dialect and place names of Shetland; two popular lectures (Lecture). Cornell University Library. Lerwick: Lerwick, T. & J. Manson. p. 79. LCCN 03002186 – via archive.org.
- Lettens, Jan (2017). "SV Illeri (+1909)". Wrecksite.
- Robertson, Richard (15 December 1848). Report of Survey for Repairs for True Blue (Report). Glasgow: Lloyd's Register Foundation. LRF-PUN-GLS140-0147-R.
- Paxton, Roland; Shipway, Jim (2007). "5. Highlands West and North, Hebrides, Orkney Islands, Shetland Islands". Civil Engineering Heritage Scotland – Highlands and Islands. Thomas Telford Publishing. pp. 250–251. doi:10.1680/cehs.34884.0005. ISBN 978-0-7277-3729-8.
- Rowlett, Russ. "Lighthouses of Scotland: Shetland". The Lighthouse Directory. University of North Carolina at Chapel Hill.
- Shetland OS Name Books, 1877-1878. Ordnance Survey Name Books. Vol. 20. 1878. OS1/31/20/3 – via Scotlands Places.
- 300045675 - Designation Report of Handling - consultation (PDF) (Report). Edinburgh: Historic Environment Scotland. 2020.
- "A Short History of the Life Saving Apparatus" (PDF). A History of South Shields Volunteer Life Brigade.
- "Award to "Elinor Viking" heroes - Department of Trade Rescue Shield for 1977" (PDF). Reardon Smith Line Limited Newsletters. No. 99. April 1978. p. 3.
- "Ben Doran: Helligoblo, Ve Skerries, Atlantic". Canmore.
- "Crew Landed at Olnafirth". The Shetland Times. 15 May 1909. p. 4 – via The British Newspaper Archive.
- "Diving". Shetland.org.
- "Elinor Viking: Reverack, Ve Skerries, Atlantic". Canmore.
- "Honours and Awards". The London Gazette. No. 47582. Her Majesty's Stationery Office. 4 July 1978. pp. 8045–8046. ISBN 0-11-657582-4.
- "Illeri: Ve Skerries, Atlantic". Canmore.
- "Major Alasdair Campbell". The Telegraph. 2 December 2012.
- "Nor: Ve Skerries, Atlantic". Canmore.
- "Station History". Royal National Lifeboat Institution (RNLI).
- Stranding and loss of the fishing vessel Coelleira (OB 93) Ve Skerries, Shetland 4 August 2019 (PDF) (Report). Marine Accident Investigation Branch. March 2020.
- "True Blue: Ve Skerries, Atlantic". Canmore.
- "Turquoise: Ve Skerries, Atlantic". Canmore.
- "Two Wrecks in the Shetlands" (PDF). The Lifeboat. XXVIII: 66–69. June 1930 – via RNLI Archive.
- "Unknown: Ve Skerries, Atlantic - Whaler (17th Century)(Possible)". Canmore.
- "Unknown: Ve Skerries, Atlantic - Barque (19th Century)". Canmore.
- "Unknown: Ve Skerries, Atlantic - Craft (18th Century)". Canmore.
- "Unknown: Ve Skerries, Atlantic - Craft (18th Century)". Canmore.
- "Unknown: Ve Skerries, Atlantic - Craft (18th Century)". Canmore.
- "Unknown: Ve Skerries, Atlantic - Craft (19th Century)". Canmore.
- "Unknown: Ve Skerries, Atlantic - Craft (19th Century)". Canmore.
- "Unknown 1725". Canmore.
- "Unknown 1748". Canmore.
- "Unknown 1762". Canmore.
- "Unknown 1880". Canmore.
- "Unknown 1892". Canmore.
- "Ve Skerries, Beacon". Canmore.
- "Ve Skerries". Northern Lighthouse Board. 2009. Archived from the original on 2014-05-21.
- "Wreck of a Norwegian Brigantine". Orkney Herald, and Weekly Advertiser and Gazette for the Orkney & Zetland Islands. 19 May 1909 – via The British Newspaper Archive.
