= MV Coelleira =

Spanish-owned fishing vessel wrecked in 2019

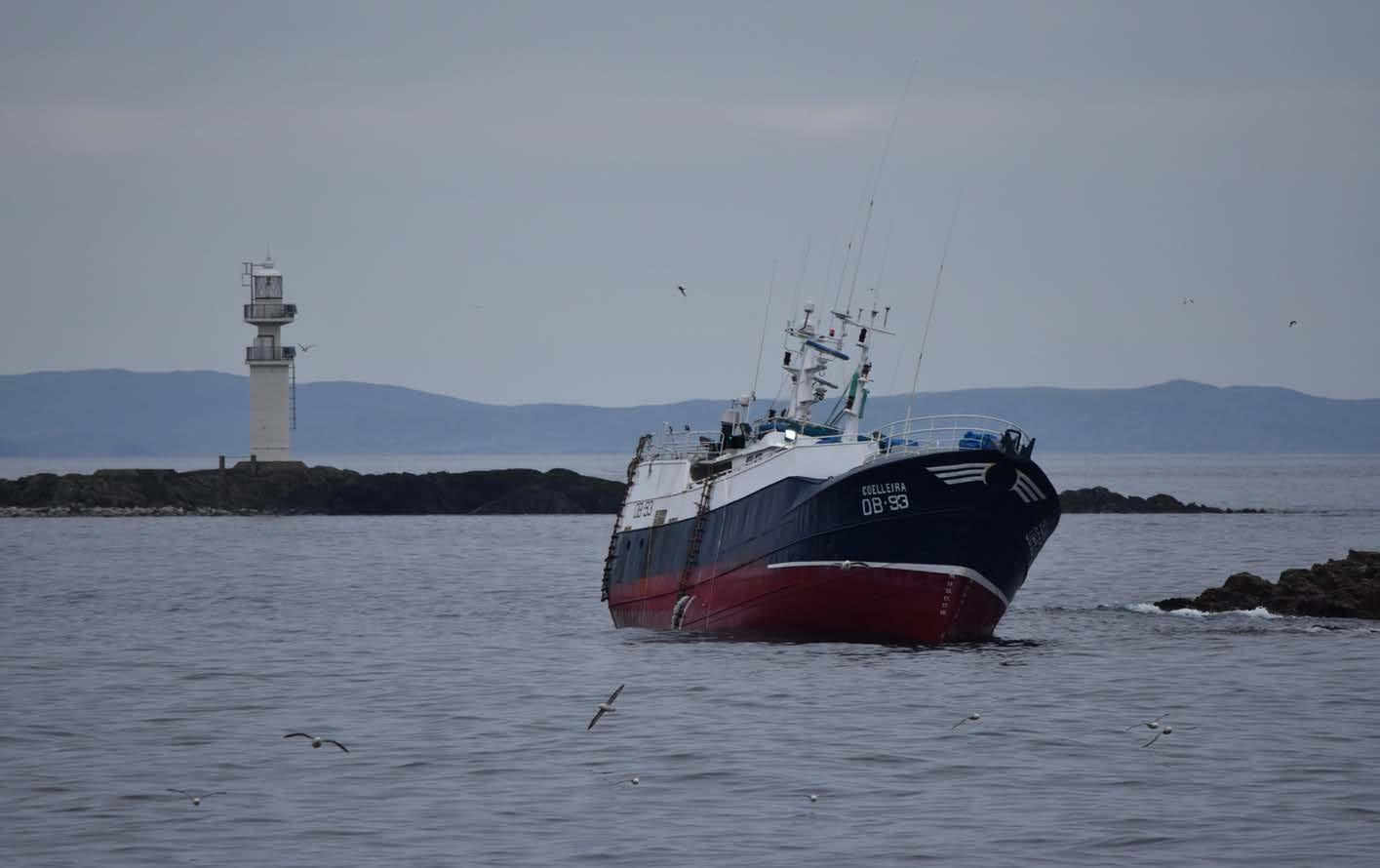
- wreck

History
- Name: Coelleira (2007–2019); Poolster (1970–2007)
- Owner: Blue Pesca Limited
- Port of registry: United Kingdom (Oban)
- Builder: Scheepswerf Haak, Zaandam, Netherlands
- Identification: IMO number: 7023063; MMSI number: 235215000; Call sign GHXZ; OB93
- Fate: Wrecked on Ve Skerries, Shetland 4 August 2019 (60.3693°N 1.8265°W)

General characteristics
- Type: Longline fishing vessel
- Tonnage: 210 GT
- Length: 30 metres (98 ft)
- Beam: 6.91 metres (22.7 ft)

MV Coelleira was a Spanish-owned fishing vessel which was built in 1970 in the Netherlands. It was wrecked on 4 August 2019 on the Ve Skerries, Shetland.

== Description ==
The vessel was built in 1970 by Scheepswerf Haak in Zaandam, Netherlands, and was originally named Poolster. The vessel was built to a length of 30 metres (98 ft) and beam of 6.91 metres (22.7 ft), with a gross tonnage of 210 GT. In 2007, the vessel was renamed Coelleira.

== Wrecking ==
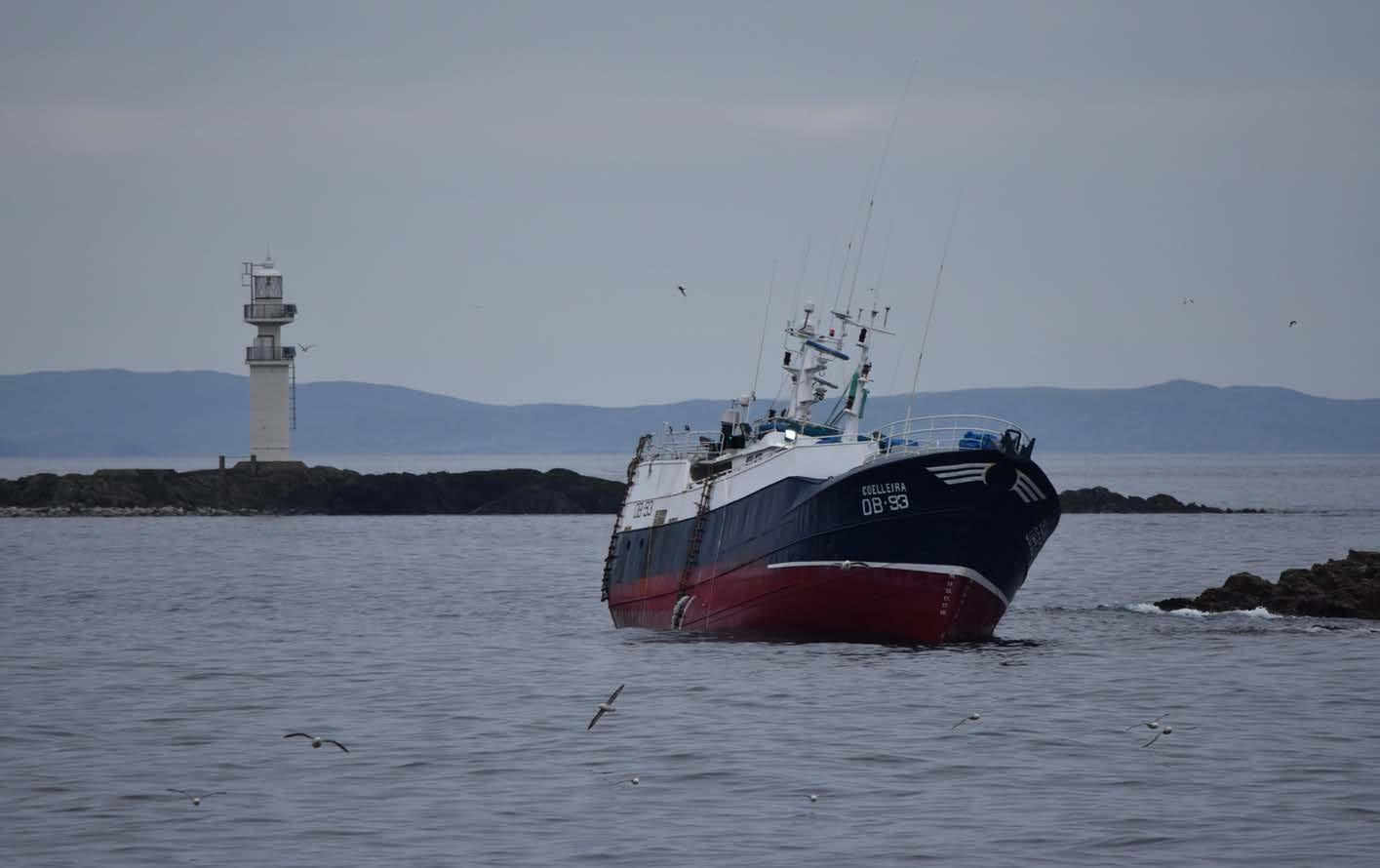
Coelleira aground on the Clubb before the salvage attempt

Late on 3 August 2019, the UK-registered, Spanish-owned fishing vessel Coelleira was returning to Scrabster from about 18 nautical miles (33 km; 21 mi) north of Yell Sound's entrance with a catch of approximately 15 tonnes of fish. Apart from the low light, the conditions were ideal – there was clear visibility, smooth seas and light winds. With the intention of returning as quickly as possible (due to unexpected delays in their fishing operations), the ship's mate set the vessel on a heading of 184° and proceeded at a speed of 9 knots (17 km/h; 10 mph) to stay near the coast in order to avoid wasting time. At 21:42, the heading was set to 204°.

At 22:30, the skipper (a 56-year-old Spanish national) took over watch from the mate, who went to bed. The skipper over the next two hours made five adjustments to the ship's heading in order to follow the coast. The skipper during this time worked on fish-landing records and other managerial work. It is not known how often the vessel's position was checked.

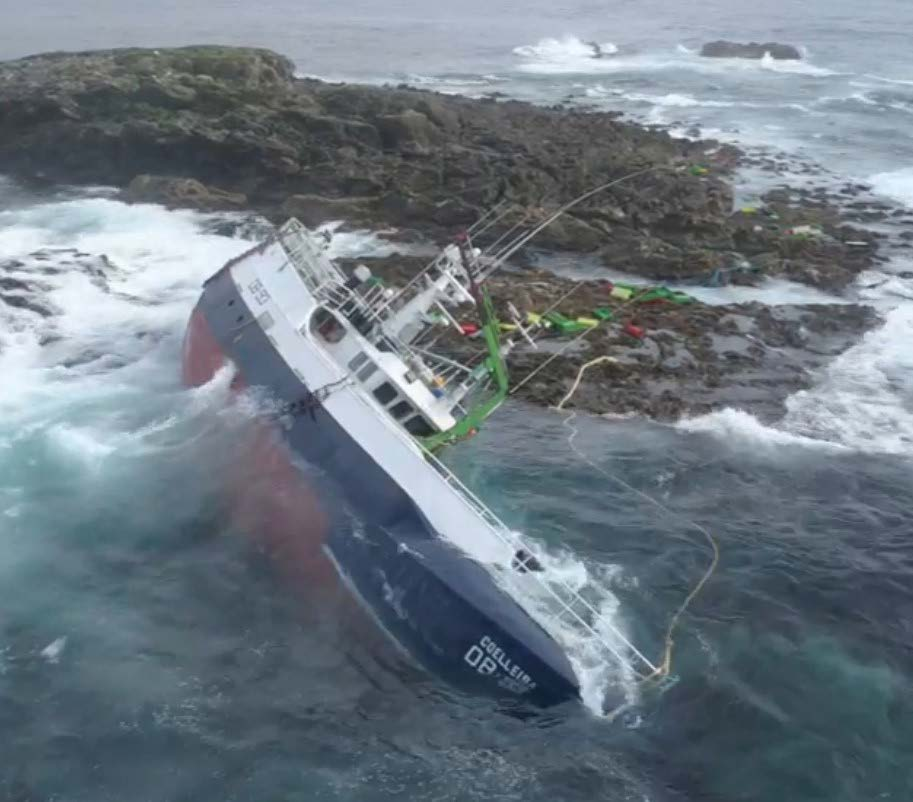
Coelleira on its port side after the salvage attempt

At 00:23 on 4 August, Coelleira was set to a heading of 206°, with the aim of keeping around 3.5 nautical miles (6.5 km; 4.0 mi) away from any navigational risk. The skipper did not see any hazards on the chartplotter, and while he did see a lighthouse light towards the port bow, he assumed it was a lighthouse on the mainland.

At an unspecified time, the skipper left the wheelhouse, and (according to a Marine Accident Investigation Branch report) while the skipper was returning to his post at 01:24, Coelleira ran aground on the Clubb, Ve Skerries travelling at 10 knots (19 km/h; 12 mph). The crew awoke with the sound of the collision, whereupon they assembled in the wheelhouse and donned survival suits and life jackets. Two lifeboats were launched off the starboard side. At 01:29, the Shetland Coastguard were notified of the accident, and in response the Aith lifeboat and a rescue helicopter were sent to the scene. All 15 crew were winched aboard the helicopter, and were returned to the emergency landing site at Clickimin in Lerwick uninjured.

Attempts were subsequently made to refloat the vessel. The ship was surveyed with assistance from the Sullom Voe Terminal tug Tystie; however, during the inspection the vessel rolled 5–10° to port, at which point the men aboard evacuated. The emergency towing vessel Ievoli Black attempted to pull Coelleira off the Clubb on 7 August; however, during the attempt the ship tilted over 55° to port, and with a forecast of poor sea conditions and weather the ship was deemed unsalvageable. In the following days the ship broke up and sank.

In its report on the incident, the Marine Accident Investigation Branch concluded that the planning of the passage between the fishing grounds and Scrabster was inadequate, the ship's position was not kept track of, and the bridge was empty when the ship ran aground. They suggested that the skipper's decision making may have been impacted by fatigue, while the set-up of the bridge's controls may have made it more difficult to observe risks to the ship.

== See also ==
- List of shipwrecks of the United Kingdom

== General sources ==
- "Coelleira". Balticshipping.com.
- "Coelleira". Marine Traffic.
- "Fifteen rescued after boat runs aground". The Shetland Times. 4 August 2019.
- Stranding and loss of the fishing vessel Coelleira (OB 93) Ve Skerries, Shetland 4 August 2019 (PDF) (Report). Marine Accident Investigation Branch. March 2020.
