= SS Point Reyes (shipwreck) =

Shipwreck

Coordinates: 38°05′52″N 122°51′03″W

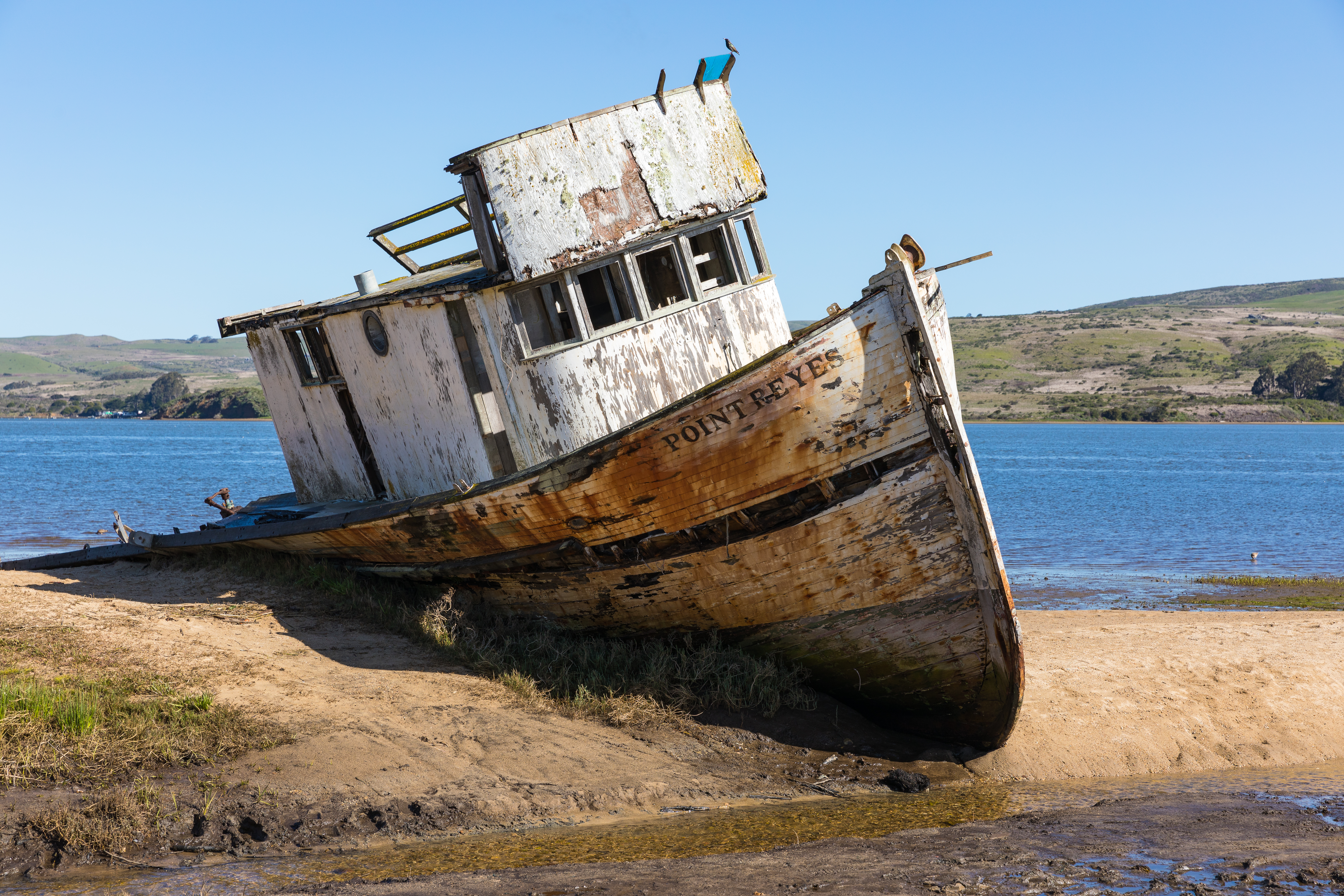
Point Reyes in Inverness on the southwest shore of Tomales Bay, Marin County, California

SS Point Reyes, also known as the Tomales Bay shipwreck or Inverness shipwreck, is an abandoned fishing vessel located on the mudflats of Tomales Bay near Inverness, California. Originally built in 1944 as a World War II launch, the vessel was later repurposed for commercial fishing. It washed ashore during the 1990s and beached on the mudflats, becoming a local landmark and a popular subject for photography.

In recent years the vessel has deteriorated significantly due to exposure to storms, strong tides and vandalism. Concerns have been raised regarding public safety and the wreck has been identified by authorities as a potential hazard. While discussions have been held about its possible removal by the NPS, no action has yet been taken.

== History ==
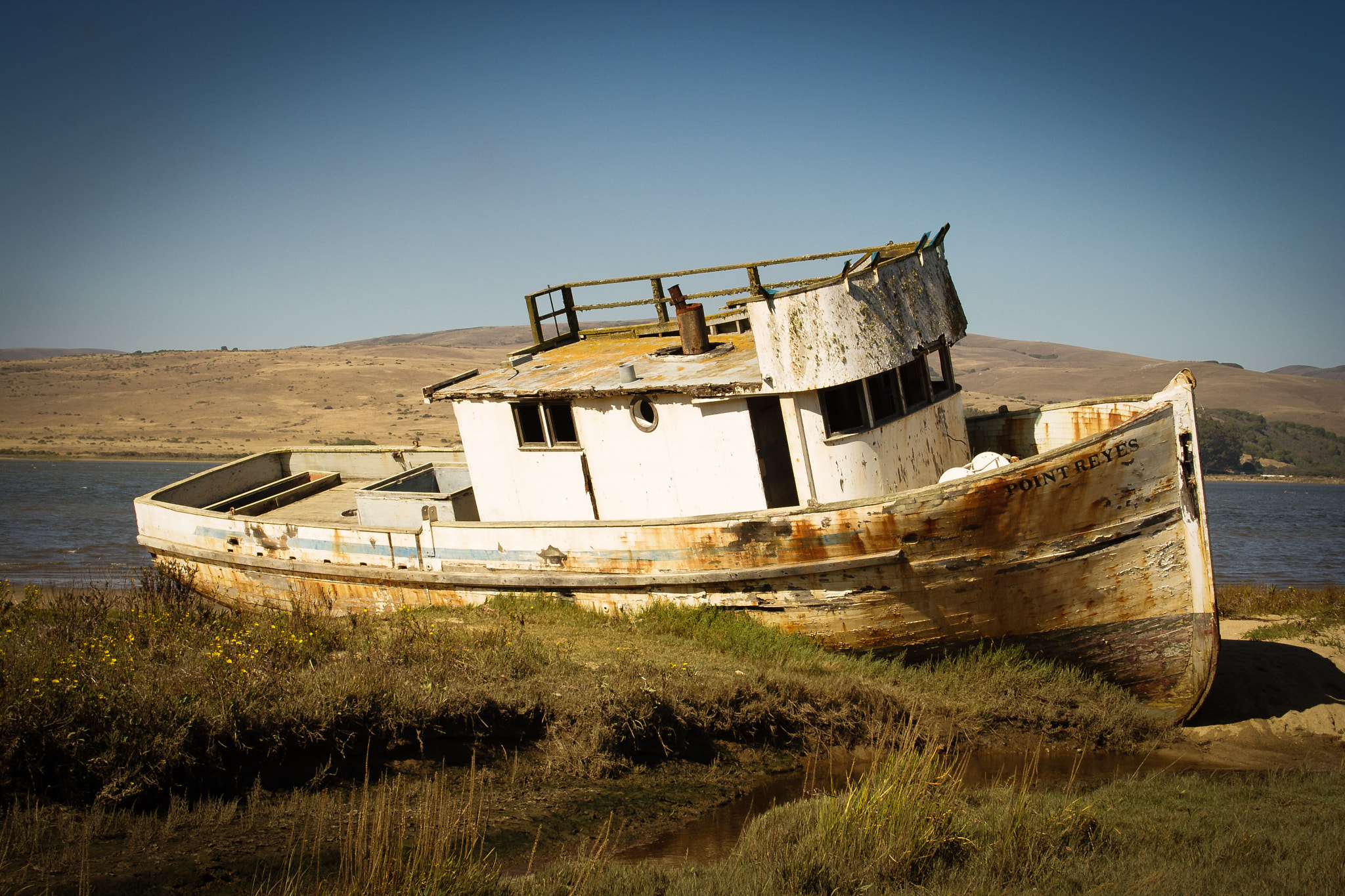
Point Reyes in 2007

Point Reyes was constructed in 1944 as a World War II launch vessel, designed to transport soldiers and equipment within coastal and bay areas. Following the conclusion of the war the vessel was repurposed for civilian use. During the 1960s and 1970s it was acquired by Merrel Rocca Sr., who operated the ship on Tomales Bay for commercial salmon fishing. Subsequently the vessel was purchased by a local resident who relocated it to Inverness with the intention of undertaking restoration. However, during a severe storm the ship was carried onto a sandbar in Tomales Bay, where it became stranded.

In 2016 Dixon Marine Services, a wetlands restoration firm, took over the land and intended to remove the vessel. These plans were prevented by local photographers. In the same year the vessel was set on fire in an accident thought to have been started by a photographer. The wreck suffered extensive damage rendering it unsafe to board.

Following a powerful storm in 2024, the wreck suffered further structural damage and began falling apart.

Despite its condition the ship continues to be a notable local landmark and a popular subject for photography in Tomales Bay.
