= Irenes Challenger =

Irenes Challenger was an oil tanker that sank in 1977 in the Pacific Ocean.

Irenes Challenger was registered in Liberia, and was owned by the Greek company Tsakos Shipping and Trading when she was lost. On January 17, 1977, Irenes Challenger was en route to Japan from Venezuela with 3,150,000 US gallons (11,900,000 L) of crude oil when she began to break up 204 miles (328 km) southeast of Midway Island. 28 of the tanker's 31 crew were rescued by Pacific Arrow, a Japanese container ship. The United States Coast Guard deployed a C-130 aircraft and the cutter USCGC Mallow to search for the missing crew, but they were never found. The oil slick was 150 square miles (388 square km) and, while the cargo of oil was lost, it was far enough offshore that it did not threaten land immediately. However, the Mallow had planned to tug the stern out to open ocean to prevent on-land ecological damage.
