= The Orcadian =

Scottish newspaper

- Type: Weekly newspaper
- Format: Tabloid (since 2018)
- Owner(s): Orkney Media Group (Anderson-Mackintosh family)
- Founder(s): James Urquhart Anderson
- Editor: Leah Seator
- Founded: 1854; 171 years ago (as A Literary and Commercial Advertiser for Orkney and Zetland)
- Language: English
- Headquarters: Kirkwall, Orkney, Scotland
- Website: www.orcadian.co.uk

The Orcadian is the oldest newspaper in Orkney, Scotland, first published in 1854. At first a monthly paper, it soon became a weekly. The newspaper is based in Kirkwall but printed in Glasgow for sale every Thursday. It is part of the Orkney Media Group, formed out of a partnership with a competing newspaper, Orkney Today, in 2007.

== History ==
The newspaper was first founded in 1854 as A Literary and Commercial Advertiser for Orkney and Zetland by James Urquhart Anderson, who established the first printing press on the island in the 1820s, and his son of the same name. The first issues were written by James, while his son printed the issues on hand set type. The Andersons were joined by Ayrshire journalist and editor W.H. Mackintosh when he married into the family in 1877, and since then, the newspaper has been owned by the Anderson-Mackintosh family.

During the Second World War, The Orcadian published a special armed forces newspaper titled Orkney Blast. A competing newspaper founded in 1860, The Orkney Herald, closed down in 1961, leaving The Orcadian as the sole newspaper on the island until the launch of Orkney Today in 2003. Following the formation of the Orkney Media Group in 2007, Orkney Today was closed in 2010, citing financial issues and low circulation, making The Orcadian again the island's only newspaper.

=== Tabloid format and modernisation ===
Until 2018, the newspaper was printed at Orkney Media's printing facilities in Kirkwall. Increasing maintenance costs and a need to modernise saw The Orcadian cease printing on Orkney to instead be printed at Newsquest's Glasgow printing facilities. This coincided with a relaunch of The Orcadian on 1 March 2018, with the newspaper redesigned and resized to tabloid format.

The paper has been edited by Leah Seator since 2016.
