= Scran =

Online library of images, sounds and film

Coordinates: 55°56′27.37″N 3°10′47.08″W

Scran was a Scottish online resource for educational use by the public, schools, further education and higher education. It presented nearly 490,000 (still and moving) images and sounds contributed by museums, galleries, archives and the media. It was established as an educational charity in 1996 and was part of Historic Environment Scotland, a registered charity and non-departmental government body. In 2025, Scran, along with other resources maintained by Historic Environment Scotland, was retired, and superseded by the new HES website, trove.scot.
