= List of shipwrecks of the United Kingdom =

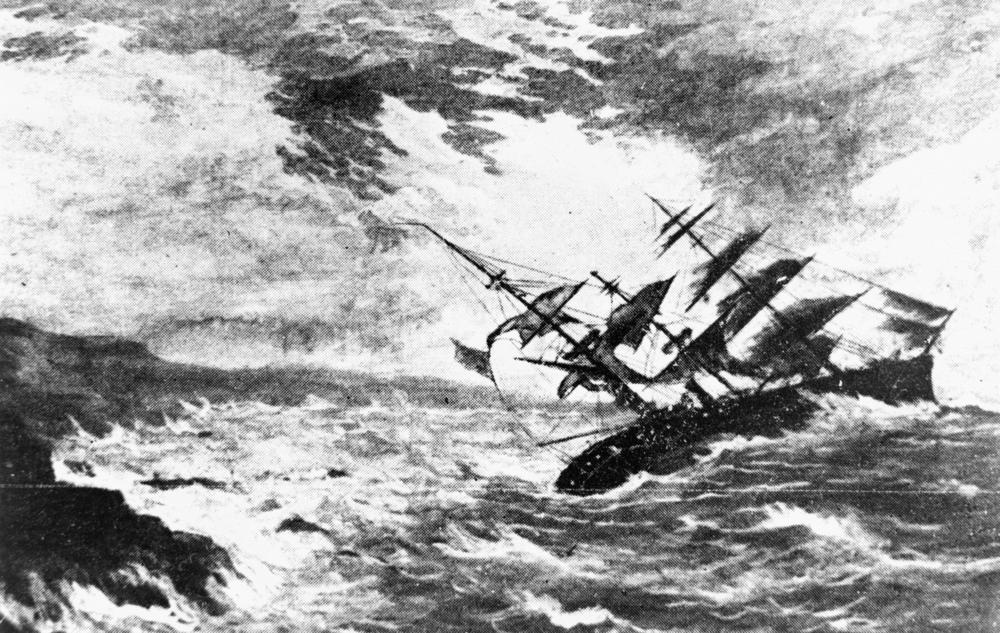
Loss of the Royal Charter in a storm on the coast of Anglesey in 1859. About 450 lives were lost.

This is a list of shipwrecks located in the United Kingdom.

== Northern Ireland ==
Ship	Flag	Sunk date	Notes	Coordinates
HMS Drake	Royal Navy	2 October 1917	Torpedoed by U-79 in Rathlin Sound.	55.298°N 6.207°W
Girona	Spanish Navy	26 October 1588	Foundered and sank off Lacada Point, County Antrim.	55.2462°N 6.5043°W
Lagan	United Kingdom	March 1946	Sank in collision off Belfast Lough.	
Normanby Hall	United Kingdom	8 October 1965	Foundered and sunk off Kilroot.	
Princess Victoria	United Kingdom	31 January 1953	Foundered in heavy seas off the Copeland Islands.	
State of Louisiana	United Kingdom	28 December 1878	A passenger liner that ran aground on Hunter Rock.	
Tiberia	United Kingdom	26 February 1918	A merchant ship torpedoed and sunk by SM U-19 off Black Head near Larne, County Antrim.	
Tullaghmurray Lass	United Kingdom	February 2002	A Kilkeel fishing boat that sank after a gas explosion.	54.060°N 5.993°W

== Scotland ==
Ship	Flag	Sunk date	Notes	Coordinates
Akka	Sweden	9 April 1956	Ran aground and was wrecked in the River Clyde.	
Annie Jane	United Kingdom	28 September 1853	Sank off Vatersay, Outer Hebrides in a gale, with the loss of 350 lives.	
RMS Aurania	United Kingdom	4 February 1918	An ocean liner that was torpedoed by UB-67 off the coast of Ireland.	56°36′N 6°20′W
Avondale Park	Canada	7 May 1945	A cargo ship that was sunk by U-2336 south of the Isle of May.	56°05′N 02°32′W
Ben Doran	United Kingdom	30 March 1930	An Aberdeen trawler that wrecked on the Ve Skerries, Shetland, killing the ~9 crew.	
Breda	Netherlands	23 December 1940	Dutch cargo ship, sunk by two German Heinkel He 111 bomber aircraft in Ardmucknish Bay off Oban.	56°28.55′N 5°25.00′W
SMS Brummer	Imperial German Navy	21 June 1919	A Brummer-class cruiser that was among the 74 ships scuttled in Scapa Flow by Admiral Reuter.	
HMS Caribbean	Royal Navy	27 November 1915	Sank 35 miles (56 km) off Cape Wrath due to bad weather.	
Cemfjord	Cyprus	2 February 2015	A cargo ship that foundered 12 nautical miles (22 km) east of Muckle Skerry.	
Coelleira	United Kingdom	4 August 2019	A Spanish-owned, UK-registered longliner that wrecked on the Ve Skerries, Shetland.	60.3693°N 1.8265°W
SMS Cöln	Imperial German Navy	21 June 1919	A Cöln-class cruiser that was among the 74 ships scuttled in Scapa Flow by Admiral Reuter.	58°53′32″N 3°03′00″W
Craigantlet	United Kingdom	26 February 1982	British container ship ran aground at Killantringan lighthouse, Wigtownshire.	
HMS Dartmouth	Royal Navy	9 October 1690	A frigate wrecked in the Sound of Mull.	56.5064°N 5.6957°W
HMS Dasher	Royal Navy	27 March 1943	Aircraft carrier sunk by a major internal explosion. Lies in the Clyde estuary.	55°36′38″N 5°00′06″W
Desabla	United Kingdom	12 June 1915	Intercepted and sunk by German submarine U-17, 35 miles (56 km) off Montrose.	
SMS Dresden	Imperial German Navy	21 June 1919	A Cöln-class cruiser that was among the 74 ships scuttled in Scapa Flow by Admiral Reuter.	
El Gran Grifón	Spanish Navy	27 September 1588	A ship of the Spanish Armada that was wrecked on Fair Isle.	
Elinor Viking	United Kingdom	9 December 1977	An Aberdeen trawler that wrecked on the Ve Skerries, Shetland.	
Empire Conveyor	United Kingdom	22 June 1940	A cargo ship torpedoed by U-122 off Barra Head.	
Flying Phantom	United Kingdom	19 December 2007	A tug that sank in foggy conditions in the River Clyde at Clydebank.	
HMS Goldfinch	Royal Navy	19 February 1915	An Acorn-class destroyer wrecked at Start Point.	
Gracechurch	United Kingdom	16 August 1940	A cargo ship that was torpedoed by U-32 off Lewis, Outer Hebrides.	58.48°N 06.49°W
HMS Graph	Royal Navy	20 March 1944	Formerly the German U-boat U-570. Captured and taken into Royal Navy service in 1942, she ran aground and was wrecked on Islay in 1944.	55°48′06″N 6°28′30″W
HMS Hampshire	Royal Navy	5 June 1916	British armoured cruiser that struck a naval mine off Orkney.	59°7′2″N 3°23′46″W
Hispania	Sweden	18 December 1954	A Swedish steamboat that struck rocks in the Sound of Mull.	56°33′55″N 5°59′13″W
HMS Imogen	Royal Navy	16 July 1940	An I-class destroyer that collided with HMS Glasgow off Duncansby Head.	58°34′N 02°54′W
Inkosi	United Kingdom	28 March 1918	A steamship that was torpedoed by U-96 south of Burrow Head.	
HMS Iolaire	Royal Navy	1 January 1919	An Admiralty yacht sank in The Minch outside Stornoway harbour with the loss of 205 men returning from World War I.	58.18774°N 6.34971°W
John Randolph	United States	5 September 1952	Struck a mine on 5 July 1942 in the Denmark Strait. The forepart was salved but broke tow on 1 September 1952 and was later wrecked at Torrisdale Bay, Sutherland on 5 September.	
SMS Karlsruhe	Imperial German Navy	21 June 1919	A Königsberg-class cruiser that was among the 74 ships scuttled in Scapa Flow by Admiral Reuter.	
HMS King Edward VII	Royal Navy	6 January 1916	A King Edward VII-class battleship that struck a naval mine laid by SMS Möwe off Cape Wrath.	
SMS König	Imperial German Navy	21 June 1919	A König-class battleship that was among the 74 ships scuttled in Scapa Flow by Admiral Reuter.	
SMS Kronprinz	Imperial German Navy	21 June 1919	A König-class battleship that was among the 74 ships scuttled in Scapa Flow by Admiral Reuter.	
Leadgate	United Kingdom	8 March 1943	A straggler from Convoy SC 121 that was hit by a torpedo from U-642 and sank west of the Hebrides. The master and 25 crewmembers were lost.	
SMS Markgraf	Imperial German Navy	21 June 1919	A König-class battleship that was among the 74 ships scuttled in Scapa Flow by Admiral Reuter.	
Orion	United Kingdom	June 1850	A paddle steamer that sank off Wigtownshire.	
HMS Port Napier	Royal Navy	27 November 1940	British minelayer ran aground in the Kyle of Lochalsh, caught fire while being unloaded, destroyed by explosion.	57°15.98′N 5°41.18′W
The Ramsey	Royal Navy	8 August 1915	An armed boarding steamer that was sunk by SMS Meteor northeast of Fair Isle.	59°36′N 001°25′W
Roebuck	Royal Navy	13 January 1915	A minesweeper that sank following a collision with HMS Imperieuse in Scapa Flow, near Longhope.	
Rondo	Norway	25 January 1935	Sunk in the Sound of Mull in a storm.	56°32.30′N 5°54.75′W
HMS Royal Oak	Royal Navy	14 October 1939	A Revenge-class battleship torpedoed in Scapa Flow by U-47, with 833 deaths.	58°55′51″N 2°59′00″W
San Juan de Silicia	Spanish Navy	5 November 1588	A ship of the Spanish Armada that was blown up at Tobermory.	
HMS Sealion	Royal Navy	13 March 1945	An S-class submarine scuttled off the Isle of Arran.	
Seniority	United Kingdom	8 November 1950	A cargo ship that sank off the Bo Vich Chuan Rock in the Outer Hebrides.	
St. Sunniva	United Kingdom	10 April 1930	A cruise ship that ran aground on the island of Mousa.	
Swan	Royal Navy	13 September 1653	A warship that sunk in a storm while anchored off Duart Castle.	
Thesis	United Kingdom	16 October 1889	A steamship that ran aground on a reef in the Sound of Mull.	
Tuscania	United Kingdom	5 February 1918	An ocean liner that was torpedoed by UB-77 off Islay, Inner Hebrides.	55°37′N 6°26′W
U-33	Kriegsmarine	12 February 1940	A Type VIIA U-boat that was sunk by HMS Gleaner in the Firth of Clyde.	55°25′N 05°07′W
U-297	Kriegsmarine	6 December 1944	A Type VIIC/41 U-boat that was sunk by a British Short Sunderland flying boat of No. 201 Squadron RAF 16 nautical miles (30 km) west of Yesnaby, Orkney Islands.	
U-714	Kriegsmarine	14 March 1945	German U-Boat sunk by depth charges from the South African frigate HMSAS Natal. She was discovered in the Firth of Forth in 2007.	55°57′N 01°57′W
U-722	Kriegsmarine	27 March 1945	A Type VIIC U-boat that was sunk in the Sea of the Hebrides by HMS Fitzroy, HMS Redmill and HMS Byron.	57°09′N 06°55′W
U-1206	Kriegsmarine	14 April 1945	A Type VIIC U-boat that sprung a leak and sank off Cruden Bay, Aberdeenshire.	57°21′N 01°39′W
UB-116	Imperial German Navy	28 October 1918	A Type UB III U-boat that was sunk by a mine while attempting to enter the Scapa Flow.	58°50′N 3°4′W
Unknown shipwreck	Unknown	Unknown	Found in 2000.	
Valkyrie II	United Kingdom	5 July 1894	A cutter that collided with Satanita on the Firth of Clyde.	55.614°N 4.950°W
HMS Vandal	Royal Navy	24 February 1943	A U-class submarine sunk off Lochranza four days after commissioning.	55°43′N 5°20′W
HMS Vanguard	Royal Navy	9 July 1917	A St. Vincent-class battleship that exploded and sank at Scapa Flow, with about 804 deaths.	58.8566°N 3.1062°W
Varyag	Imperial Russian Navy	1925	A Russian protected cruiser that ran aground and sank in the Firth of Clyde.	55°11′03″N 04°56′30″W
HMS Vivid	Royal Navy	8 July 1913	A training ship of the Royal Technical College, Glasgow, ran aground and wrecked at Colonsay of her first voyage as a training ship.	

== Wales ==
Ship	Flag	Sunk date	Notes	Coordinates
Amazonese	Unknown	15 April 1881	A cargo steamship that ran aground at St. David's Head.	
Behar	United Kingdom	24 November 1940	A 6,100-ton steamer, 436 ft (133 m) in length, with a cargo of 4,700 tons of government stores, allegedly including Harley Davidson motorbikes. Sunk by magnetic parachute mine in Milford Haven, Pembrokeshire.	52°43′N 5°07′W
Calburga	Canada	13 November 1915	A Canadian barque that ran aground in a gale off Strumble Head.	
Castilian	United Kingdom	12 February 1943	A cargo ship that ran aground off The Skerries, Anglesey.	53°25.0107′N 4°35.9176′W
HMS Conway	Royal Navy	14 April 1953	A training ship wrecked near Menai Bridge.	
Dakotian	United Kingdom	21 November 1940	A 6,400-ton steamer, 400 ft (120 m) in length, with a cargo of 1,300 tons of tinplate. Sunk by magnetic parachute mine approximately 1-nautical-mile (1.9 km) west of Dale in Milford Haven, Pembrokeshire.	
Diamond	United States	2 January 1825	A protected wrecksite; a three-masted square rigger with a composite hull, forerunner of the Ocean liners, lost in Cardigan Bay.	52.520°N 4.541°W
Empire Beacon	United Kingdom	5 April 1942	A coastal trading vessel that struck a mine off Pembrokeshire.	51°41′N 5°10′W
Faraday	United Kingdom	25 March 1941	A cable layer that was attacked by a Heinkel He 111 off Milford Haven, Pembrokeshire, and sank the following day off St Anne's Head. It is now a protected wreck.	
Herefordshire	United Kingdom	15 March 1934	Former Bibby Line liner, 7,000 tons, on passage to breakers, lost tow in a storm and ran aground on Cardigan Island; no lives lost, but rats destroyed puffin and Manx shearwater colonies; lies in 12m of water.	
Lelia	Confederate States Navy	14 January 1865	A steamship that sank in a storm off the Great Orme.	53.371°N 3.849°W
Loch Shiel (aka Whiskey Wreck)	United Kingdom	30 January 1877	A 1,218-ton rigged sailing ship, 225 ft (69 m) in length, with a cargo of 7,000 cases of whiskey, beer & general goods. Ran aground at Thorne Island in Milford Haven, Pembrokeshire. Now at a depth of 25 feet (7.6 m), is very broken up, but the brick ballast is still visible.	
Lucy	Netherlands	14 February 1967	A 52-metre (171 ft) coaster, sank off Skomer Island, Pembrokeshire, while carrying a cargo of calcium carbide from Uddevalla, Sweden to Barry.	
HMY Mary	Royal Navy	25 March 1675	A protected wrecksite; the first British Royal Yacht, hit rocks in fog off Anglesey.	53.265°N 4.363°W
Ocean Monarch	United States	25 August 1848	A barque that caught fire and sank northeast of Llandudno.	53°25′40.00″N 3°35′27.00″W
Pacific	United States	January 1856	A Collins Line transatlantic steamer that sank (possibly in the Irish Sea) from unknown causes. Wreck found in 1986.	
Paul	Germany	30 October 1925	A four masted windjammer that was wrecked on the Cefn Sidan sands.	51.7332°N 4.3749°W
Resurgam II	United Kingdom	25 February 1880	A protected wrecksite near Rhyl.	53°23.78′N 03°33.18′W
Rothsay Castle	United Kingdom	18 August 1831	A paddle steamer that ran aground and broke up at the eastern end of the Menai Strait in 1831.	53°17′00″N 04°00′30″W
Royal Charter	United Kingdom	26 October 1859	A steam clipper driven onto rocks near Moelfre, Anglesey.	53.354°N 4.235°W
Samtampa	United States	23 April 1947	A steamship wrecked off Sker Point.	51°30′01″N 03°44′26″W
Swanland	Cook Islands	27 November 2011	Sank after hitting a large wave following gale force 8 conditions 20 nautical miles (37 km) off the coast of Anglesey.	
U-58	Imperial German Navy	17 November 1917	A Type U 57 U-boat that was sunk by USS Fanning in the action of 17 November 1917.	51°32′N 05°21′W
U-1302	Kriegsmarine	7 March 1945	A Type VIIC/41 U-boat that was sunk by depth charges from the Canadian frigates HMCS La Hulloise, Strathadam and Thetford Mines in St. George's Channel.	52°19′N 5°23′W
Walter L M Russ	United Kingdom	15 July 1945	A German cargo ship that was captured by the Allies and ran aground on Grassholm.	51.7308°N 5.4814°W
HMS Whirlwind	Royal Navy	29 October 1974	A W-class destroyer that was sunk as a target in Cardigan Bay.	52°16′47″N 04°40′41″W
