= Canmore (database) =

Database for ancient and historical monuments of Scotland

- Location: Scotland
- Type: Online database
- Affiliation: Historic Environment Scotland
- Collection size: 320,000 historic sites; 1.3 million catalogue entries
- Website: canmore.org.uk

Canmore was an online database or index to information on over 320,000 archaeological sites, monuments, and buildings in Scotland. It was launched by the Royal Commission on the Ancient and Historical Monuments of Scotland in 1997 as the Computer Application for National Monuments Record Enquiries. Canmore provided access to the National Monuments Record of Scotland (NMRS), which was founded in 1966 as an amalgam of the important archive of plans and photographs held by the RCAHMS and the Ministry of Public Building and Works. The NMRS was further developed with material from the Scottish National Buildings Record, the National Art Survey, the Ordnance Survey and the Scottish Office Air Photographs Unit. Historic Environment Scotland had maintained Canmore since 2015. The Canmore website latterly provided access to the National Record of the Historic Environment, formerly the National Monuments Record of Scotland, and contained around 1.3 million catalogue entries. It included marine monuments and designated official wreck sites (those that fall under the Protection of Wrecks Act), such as the wreck of HMS Pheasant (1916).

In May 2025, Historic Environment Scotland announced that Canmore would be switched off on 24 June, along with Scran and ScotlandsPlaces. The site now redirects to the replacement platform Trove.
