= The Orkney Herald =

The Orkney Herald (1860–1961) was a newspaper published in Kirkwall on the Orkney islands in Scotland. It was initially called the Orkney Herald, and Weekly Advertiser and Gazette for the Orkney & Zetland Islands from 1860, and then the Orkney Herald, and Weekly Advertiser and Gazette for the Northern Counties from 3 January 1877 to 24 July 1940. It continued as the Orkney Herald until it closed on 10 January 1961.

Jack Twatt was the editor from 1951 to 1961.

The poet George Mackay Brown wrote for the Orkney Herald from 1944 into the mid-1950s. The poet Robert Rendall wrote for the paper around the same time. The Orcadian writer Ernest Marwick was on its staff from 1955 to 1960.

== See also ==
- The Orcadian
